= List of windmills in East Flanders =

A list of windmills in the Belgian province of East Flanders.

Location	Name of mill	Type	Built	Notes	Photograph
Aalst	Molen van Mossevelde	Stellingmolen	1758	Molenechos (in Dutch)	
Aalter	Oude Molen	Grondzeiler	1862	Molenechos (in Dutch)	
Aalter	Nieuwe Tommenmolen	Staakmolen	2008	Molenechos (in Dutch)	
Appelterre-Eichem	Wildermolen	Staakmolen	1801	Molenechos (in Dutch)	
Assenede	Hollandse Molen	Bergmolen	1862	Molenechos (in Dutch)	
Baaigem	Prinsenmolen	Bergmolen	1806	Molenechos (in Dutch)	
Baasrode	Heirbaanmolen	Bergmolen	Late 18th or early 19th century	Molenechos (in Dutch)	
Baasrode	Bookmolen; Blokkesmolen; Molen de Blok; Schrickmolen	Bergmolen	Early 19th century	Molenechos (in Dutch)	
Baasrode	Dokkersmolen; Kleine Moleken	Bergmolen	1889	Molenechos (in Dutch)	
Balegem	Klepmolen	Bergmolen	1889	Molenechos (in Dutch)	
Balegem	Guillotinemolen; Grote Kucher	Bergmolen	1789	Molenechos (in Dutch)	
Balegem	Windekemolen; De Visscher	Staakmolen	1910	Molenechos (in Dutch)	
Beervelde	Molen Wayenbergh; Molen De Wilde	Grondzeiler	1873	Molenechos (in Dutch)	
Belsele	Roomanmolen	Stellingmolen	1862	Molenechos (in Dutch)	
Beveren-Waas	Van Hove Molen; Nieuwe Molen	Stellingmolen	1822	Molenechos (in Dutch)	
Buggenhout	Patattenmolen; Plaatsemolen	Grondzeiler	c. 1815	Molenechos (in Dutch)	
Buggenhout	Weiveldmolen	Bergmolen	18th century	Molenechos (in Dutch)	
Denderbelle	Bellemolen; Het Fonteintje	Grondzeiler	18th century	Molenechos (in Dutch)	
Denderhoutem	Molen De Graeve	Bergmolen	1891	Molenechos (in Dutch)	
Denderwindeke	Ter Zeven Wegen	Bergmolen	1790	Molenechos (in Dutch)	
Destelbergen	Molen Buyst	Bergmolen	Early 19th century	Molenechos (in Dutch)	
Desteldonk	Molen Verschaffel; Molen De Craene	Bergmolen	1876	Molenechos (in Dutch)	
Desteldonk	Molen Van Hoeke	Bergmolen	1904	Molenechos (in Dutch)	
Deurle	Molentje van Cyriel Buysse	Staakmolen	1921	Molenechos (in Dutch)	
Dikkelvenne	Tarandusmolen	Grondzeiler	1771	Molenechos (in Dutch)	
Doel	Scheldemolen; Molen van Doel	Grondzeiler	1614	Molenechos (in Dutch)	
Doornzele		Beltmolen			
Drongen	Hoosmolen; Watermolen	Grondzeiler	1701	Molenechos (in Dutch)	
Elene	Windmolen	Grondzeiler	1762	Molenechos (in Dutch)	
Elst	Ooievaarsmolen	Grondzeiler	1841	Molenechos (in Dutch)	
Ertvelde	Stenen Molen	Grondzeiler	1798	Molenechos (in Dutch)	
Erwetegem	Kattenbergmolen	Stellingmolen			
Etikhove	De Nieuwe Bossenare	Staakmolen	1763	Molenechos (in Dutch)	
Everbeek	Kapellekoutermolen	Bergmolen	c. 1791	Molenechos (in Dutch)	
Evergem	Gerardsmolen; Wippelgemmolen...	Bergmolen	1864	Molenechos (in Dutch)	
Gontrode	Meireleires Molentje	Staakmolen	1971	Molenechos (in Dutch)	
Grotenberge	Stenen Molen	Grondzeiler	c. 1770	Molenechos (in Dutch)	
Hamme	De Grote Napoleon	Bergmolen	1817	Molenechos (in Dutch)	
Hamme	De Groten Dorst	Grondzeiler	Late 18th century	Molenechos (in Dutch)	
Herzele	Molen ter Rijst	Grondzeiler	1794	Molenechos (in Dutch)	
Herzele	Molen te Rullegem	Staakmolen	c. 1750	Molenechos (in Dutch)	
Heusden	Remuemolen	Bergmolen	1868	Molenechos (in Dutch)	
Huise	Huisekoutermolen	Staakmolen	1972	Originally built at Waregem in the early 16th century. Moved to Huise in 1972. Molenechos (in Dutch) Blown down 19 June 2026.	
Huise	Clementsmolen	Bergmolen	1902	Molenechos (in Dutch)	
Hundelgem	De Oude Madrienne	Grondzeiler	1763	Molenechos (in Dutch)	
Kalken	Kruisenmolen	Bergmolen	1893	Molenechos (in Dutch)	
Kaprijke	Molen van de Steene	Stellingmolen	1804	Molenechos (in Dutch)	
Kaprikje	Westermolen	Staakmolen	1785	Onroerend Erfgoed (in Dutch)	
Kluizen	Molen van Francies Buysse	Stellingmolen	Early 19th century	Molenechos (in Dutch)	
Knesselare	Pietendriesmolen	Staakmolen	1804	Molenechos (in Dutch)	
Knesselare	De Vreeses Molen	Stellingmolen	1866	Molenechos (in Dutch)	
Laarne	Aumansmolen	Grondzeiler	c. 1805	Molenechos (in Dutch)	
Laarne	Bautsmolen	Bergmolen	1866	Molenechos (in Dutch)	
Lede	Tukmolen	Staakmolen	1723	Onroerend Erfgoed (in Dutch)	
Lembeek	Westmolen	Staakmolen	1785	Molenechos (in Dutch)	
Lochristi	Reynaertmolen; Dorpmolen	Staakmolen	1978	Molenechos (in Dutch)	
Lokeren	Heirbrugmolen	Bergmolen	1852	Molenechos (in Dutch)	
Lovendegem	Vlaanderensmolen	Bergmolen	1731	Onroerend Erfgoed (in Dutch)	
Machelen	Hostensmolen	Stellingmolen	1840	Molenechos (in Dutch)	
Maldegem	Rotsaertmolen; Brielmolen	Achtkante molen	18th century	Molenechos (in Dutch)	
Maldegem	Ceulenaersmolen	Bergmolen	1866	Molenechos (in Dutch)	
Mater	Tissenhovemolen	Staakmolen	1768	Molenechos (in Dutch)	
Melle	Lindemolen	Bergmolen	1847	Molenechos (in Dutch)	
Melsen	Stenen Molen	Stellingmolen	1771	Molenechos (in Dutch)	
Mendonk	Westmeersmolen	Grondzeiler	1819	Molenechos (in Dutch)	
Mere	Kruiskoutermolen; Jezuïtenmolen; Molen Van Der Haegen	Staakmolen	1921	Originally built at Nieuwerkerken in 1632, moved to Mere in 1921; Molenechos (in Dutch)	
Merelbeke	Het Stampkot	Bergmolen	1787	Molenechos (in Dutch)	
Merendree	Steyaertmolen	Bergmolen	1843	Molenechos (in Dutch)	
Middelburg	Poedermolen; De Bruyckers Molen	Stellingmolen	1847	Molenechos (in Dutch)	
Moortsele	Molen De Coene	Grondzeiler	1878	Molenechos (in Dutch)	
Mullem	Bekemolen	Stellingmolen	1903	Molenechos (in Dutch)	
Nukerke	Ter Hengst	Grondzeiler	1834	Molenechos (in Dutch)	
Nukerke	Ter Kruissenmolen	Grondzeiler	Early 19th century	Molenechos (in Dutch)	
Nukerke	Ter Sleepe	Grondzeiler	c. 1800	Molenechos (in Dutch)	
Oombergen	Nieuwpoortmolen; Gangmolen	Grondzeiler	1912	Molenechos (in Dutch)	
Oordegem	Fauconniersmolen	Stellingmonen	1845	Molenechos (in Dutch)	
Oosterzele	Roosbloemmolen	Bergmolen	Early 19th century	Molenechos (in Dutch)	
Opbrakel	Verrebeekmolen	Grondzeiler	1803	Molenechos (in Dutch)	
Opdorp	Stenen Molen	Grondzeiler	1794	Molenechos (in Dutch)	
Oudegem	Molen Abbeloos; Stenenmolen; Bierens Molen	Bergmolen	1870	Molenechos (in Dutch)	
Overboelare	Molen De Neve	Bergmolen	1764	Molenechos (in Dutch)	
Poeke	Artemeersmolen; Hartemeersmolen	Bergmolen	1810	Molenechos (in Dutch)	
Ronse	Triburymolen	Grondzeiler	1850	Molenechos (in Dutch)	
Ronse	Moulin Massez	Bergmolen			
Ronse		Staakmolen			
Rozebeke	Koutermolen	Grondzeiler	1712	Molenechos (in Dutch)	
Schelderode	Schelderomolen; Witte Wachter	Bergmolen	1907	Molenechos (in Dutch)	
Semmerzake	Molen De Ronne; De Ronnemolen; Molenhof	Stellingmolen	1848	Molenechos (in Dutch)	
Sint Antelinks	Buysesmolen; Molen Ter Rijst	Staakmolen	2008	Molenechos (in Dutch)	
Sint-Denijs-Boekel	Vinkemolen	Staakmolen	1790	Molenechos (in Dutch)	
Sint-Gillis	Sint-Antoniusmolen; Molen Van Damme	Bergmolen	1901	Molenechos (in Dutch)	
Sint-Kornelis-Horebeke	Hoogkoutermolen	Grondzeiler	1816	Molenechos (in Dutch)	
Sint-Laureins	Fraukensmolen	Stellingmolen	1872	Onroerend Erfgoed (in Dutch)	
Sint-Lievens-Houtem	Thienpondtsmolen	Grondzeiler	1755	Molenechos (in Dutch)	
Sint-Margriete	Baeyens Molen	Grondzeiler	1876	Molenechos (in Dutch)	
Sint-Maria-Horebeke	Plankeveldmolen	Grondzeiler	1816	Molenechos (in Dutch)	
Sint-Maria-Oudenhove		Staakmolen			
Sint-Maria-Oudenhove	Molentje van Audenhove	Staakmolen	1982	Molenechos (in Dutch)	
Sint-Martens-Latem	Koutermolen; Latemse Molen; Sint-Baafsmolen	Staakmolen	1798	Originally built at Ghent in 1614, moved to Sint-Martens-Latem in 1798. Molenechos (in Dutch)	
Sint-Martens-Latem	Molen Cyriel Busse	Staakmolen	1922	Onroerend Erfgoed (in Dutch)	
Sint-Martens-Lierde		Staakmolen	1970s	¼ scale model Molenechos (in Dutch)	
Sint-Niklaas	Witte Molen	Grondzeiler	1696	Molenechos (in Dutch)	
Sint-Pauwels	Roomanmolen	Stellingmolen	1847	Molenechos (in Dutch)	
Steenhuize-Wijnhuize	Doornbroekmolen; Kostersmolen	Bergmolen	1774	Molenechos (in Dutch)	
Ursel	Baelkes Molen; Steyaertmolen	Bergmolen	1858	Molenechos (in Dutch)	
Vinderhoute	Van Vlaenderensmolen	Bergmolen	1731	Molenechos (in Dutch)	
Waasmunster	Molen van Sint-Anna	Grondzeiler	Early 19th century	Molenechos (in Dutch)	
Wachtebeke	Van Holles Molen	Staakmolen	2005	Molenechos (in Dutch)	
Wachtebeke	Westmeersmolen	Grondzeiler	1819	Onroerend Erfgoed (in Dutch)	
Wannegem-Lede	Houtavemolen; Schietsjampettermolen	Staakmolen	1981	Originally built at Houtave, West Flanders in the 16th century, moved here in 1981.Molenechos (in Dutch)	
Watervliet	Fraukensmolen; Vrouwkensmolen	Stellingmolen	1872	Molenechos (in Dutch)	
Wortegem	Boonzackmolen; Boonzackmolen	Bergmolen	1785	Molenechos (in Dutch)	
Zele	Doginnemolen; Daeginnemolen	Grondzeiler	Early 19th century	Molenechos (in Dutch)	
Zelzate	Kattemolen	Bergmolen	1872	Molenechos (in Dutch)	
Zingem	Meuleke 't Dal	Staakmolen	Late 14th century	Molenechos (in Dutch)	
Zulzeke	Hotondmolen; De Hotond	Grondzeiler	Early 19th century	Molenechos (in Dutch)	
Zwijnaarde	De Windmolen; Molen Sonneville; Oliemolen	Bergmolen	1818	Molenechos (in Dutch)	

== Notes ==
Bold indicates a mill that is still standing. Italics indicates a mill with some remains surviving.
