= Witte Molen =

Witte Molen (English: White Mill) is the name of a number of windmills in Belgium and the Netherlands.

- Witte Molen, Aarschot, a tower mill in Brabant, Belgium.
- De Witte Molen, Bolsward, a post mill in Friesland, Netherlands.
- De Witte Molen, Glimmen, a smock mill in Groningen, Netherlands.
- De Witte Molen, Lille, a tower mill in Antwerp province, Belgium.
- De Witte Molen, Lillo, a tower mill in Antwerp province, Belgium.
- De Witte Molen, Meeuwen, a tower mill in North Brabant, Netherlands.
- Witte Molen, Moorsele, a tower mill in West Flanders, Belgium.
- Witte Molen, Nijmegen, a tower mill in Gelderland, Netherlands.
- De Witte Molen, Rilland-Bath, a tower mill in Zeeland, Netherlands.
- Witte Molen, Roksem, a tower mill in West Flanders, Belgium.
- Witte Molen, Sint-Niklaas, a tower mill in East Flanders, Belgium.
- Witte Molen, Wervik, a tower mill in West Flanders, Belgium.

See also

- Moulin Blanc (disambiguation)
- White Mill (disambiguation)
