= Moulin Blanc =

Moulin Blanc or Blanc Moulin (English: White Mill) is the name of a number of windmills in France and Belgium.

- Blanc Moulin, Ellezelles, Ostiches, or Moulin Blanc, Laplaigne, tower mills in Hainaut, Belgium
- Moulin Blanc, Brem-sur-Mer, a tower mill in Vendée, France
- Moulin Blanc, Templeuve, a unique windmill in Nord, France
- Moulin Blanc, Leers, or Saint-Amand-Les-Eaux, other tower mills in Nord, France
- Moulin Blanc, Offekerque, a tower mill in Pas-de-Calais, France
- Moulin Blanc, Saint-Cyprien, a tower mill in Deux-Sèvres, France
- Moulin Blanc, Saint-Pierre-d'Oléron, a tower mill in Charente-Maritime, France
- Moulin des Blancs Manteaux, a tower mill in Essonne, France

== See also ==
- White Mill (disambiguation)
- Witte Molen (disambiguation)
- Parc du Moulin Blanc, landscape gardens in Saint-Zacharie, Var, France
