= Belgian Bowling =

Belgian Bowling may refer to one of these games of Belgian origin which are also played in parts of North America:

- Feather Bowling or trabollen, in which the court is a curved trough
- Rolle Bolle or krulbollen, in which the court is flat
