= Oudemolen =

Oudemolen ("Old mill"), Oude Molen or De Oude Molen may refer to:-

== Places ==
- Oudemolen, Drenthe
- Oudemolen, North Brabant
- Oude Molen, North Brabant, a village in North Brabant
- Oude Molen, a village in Overijssel
- Oude-Molen, a hamlet in South Holland

== Windmills ==
In Belgium

- Oude Molen, Aalter, a windmill in East Flanders
- Oude Molen, Betekorn, a windmill in Flemish Brabant
- Oude Molen, Hekelgem, a windmill in Flemish Brabant
- Oude Molen, Keerbergen, a windmill in Flemish Brabant
- Oude Molen, Knokke, a windmill in West Flanders
- Oude Molen, Oostkerke, a windmill in West Flanders
- Oude Molen, Tessenderlo, a windmill in Limburg

In the Netherlands

- De Oude Molen, Colijnsplaat, a windmill in Zeeland
- De Oude Molen, Kruiningen, a windmill in Zeeland
- De Oude Molen, Oudemolen, a windmill in North Brabant
- De Oude Molen, Wijchen, a windmill in Gelderland
- De Oude Molen, Winterswijk, a windmill in Gelderland

In South Africa

- Oude Molen, Cape Town, a tower mill in South Africa

== Watermills ==
- Oude Molen, Simpelveld, former watermill and Dutch national monument in Simpelveld

== Distillery ==
- Oude Molen Distillery in South Africa

== See also ==
- Alde Swarte Molen, Easterlittens, a windmill in Friesland
