= List of windmills in Nord =

Windmills in Nord, France

A list of windmills in Nord, France.

Location	Name of mill	Type	Built	Notes	Photograph
Attiches	Moulin d'Attiches	Moulin Pivot		Moved to Valmy, Marne in 1947	
Avesnes-le-Sec	Moulin de Pierre				
Boeschepe	Ondankmeulen; Moulin de l'Ingratitude	Moulin Pivot	1884	Originally built at Morbecque in 1802. Moulins-a-Vent (in French)	
Boussières-en-Cambrésis	Moulin de Boussières en Cambrésis #1	Moulin Tour		Moulins-a-Vent (in French)	
Boussières-en-Cambrésis	Moulin de Boussières en Cambrésis #2	Moulin Tour		Moulins-a-Vent (in French)	
Broxeele	Moulin de Broxeele	Moulin Tour		Moulins-a-Vent (in French)	
Caëstre	Moulin de St Joseph	Moulin Tour			
Carnières	Moulin de Carnières	Moulin Tour		Moulins-a-Vent (in French)	
Cassel	Casteelmeulen	Moulin Pivot	16th century	Burnt down 30 October 1911. Moulins-a-Vent (in French)	
Cassel	Casteelmeulen	Moulin Pivot	1947	Originally built in the 18th century at Arneke; Moulins-a-Vent (in French)	
Cattenières	Moulin de Cattenières	Moulin Tour		Moulins-a-Vent (in French)	
Dehéries		Moulin Tour			
Dunkerque		Moulin Tour en Bois			
Flines-lès-Mortagne		Moulin Tour			
Grand-Fort-Philippe	Moulin a Grand Fort Phillipe	Moulin Tour		Moulins-a-Vent (in French)	
Gravelines	Moulin des Huttes; Moulin Lebriez	Moulin Pivot	1932	Moulins-a-Vent (in French)	
Gravelines	Moulin Loquet	Moulin Tour	1852	Moulins-a-Vent (in French)	
Halluin	Moulin Hollebecque	Moulin Tour	1879	Moulins-a-Vent (in French)	
Haucourt-en-Cambrésis	Moulin d'Haucourt	Moulin Tour		Moulins-a-Vent (in French)	
Hondschoote	Moulin Delebaere	Moulin Tour		Moulins-a-Vent (in French)	
Hondschoote	Moulin de Nord; Noortmeulen	Moulin Pivot	1547	Moulins-a-Vent (in French)	
Hondschoote	Moulin de la Victoire; Spinnewynmeulen	Moulin Pivot	16th century	Moulins-a-Vent (in French)	
Houdain-lez-Bavay		Moulin Tour		Ruin	
Houtkerque	Moulin de l'Hofland	Moulin Pivot	1782	Moulins-a-Vent (in French)	
La Gorgue	Moulin de Gailly	Moulin Tour			
Leers	Moulin Blanc	Moulin Tour	1852	Moulins-a-Vent (in French)	
Les Moëres	Moulin du Rhin	Moulin Tour		Moulins-a-Vent (in French)	
Looberghe	Moulin Regost; Moulin de l'Hostine	Moulin Tour en Bois		Moulins-a-Vent (in French)	
Looberghe	Moulin Meesemaker	Moulin Tour	1840	Moulins-a-Vent (in French)	
Marpent	Moulin de la Parapette	Moulin Tour		Moulins-a-Vent (in French)	
Maubeuge	Moulin Tablette	Moulin Tour		Moulins-a-Vent (in French)	
Mouscron	(Three mills)	Two Moulin Pivots and one Moulin Tour en Bois		Standing in 1794	
Neuville-Saint-Rémy	Moulin Savary	Moulin Tour			
Neuville-Saint-Rémy	Moulin du Mont Farrand	Moulin Tour			
Noordpeene	Moulin du Coin Perdu	Moulin Tour		Moulins-a-Vent (in French)	
Pitgam	Moulin du Lion; Moulin den Leeuw; Moulin Dendrael	Moulin Pivot	1774	Moulins-a-Vent (in French)	
Quiévy	Moulin de Quiévy	Moulin Tour		Moulins-a-Vent (in French)	
Saint-Amand-Les-Eaux	Moulin Blanc	Moulin Tour	1802	Moulins-a-Vent (in French)	
Saint-Aubert-en-Cambrésis	Moulin de Saint Aubert	Moulin Tour		Moulins-a-Vent (in French)	
Saint-Vaast-en-Cambrésis	Moulin à huile	Moulin Tour	1857	Moulins-a-Vent (in French)	
Steenvoorde	Drievenmeulen	Moulin Pivot	1774	Moulins-a-Vent (in French)	
Steenvoorde	Noordmeulen	Moulin Pivot	1576	Moulins-a-Vent (in French)	
Templeuve	Moulin de Vertain; Moulin Blanc; Moulin de Briques	Moulin Tour	15th century	Moulins-a-Vent (in French)	
Templeuve		Moulin Pivot			
Terdeghem	Moulin Saint Arnoult; Steenmeulen	Moulin Tour	1864	Moulins-a-Vent (in French)	
Terdgehem	Moulin de la Roome	Moulin Pivot	1998	Moulins-a-Vent (in French)	
Troisvilles	Moulin des Pierres	Moulin Tour			
Villeneuve d'Ascq	Moulin des Olieux	Moulin Pivot	1950	Originally built at Audruicq in 1743, moved to Offekerque in 1901 and Villeneude d'Ascq in 1950. Moulins-a-Vent (in French)	
Villeneuve d'Ascq	Moulin à Farine	Moulin Pivot	1979	Originally built at Bambecque, later moved to Ruminghem. To Villeneuve d'Ascq in 1979; Moulins-a-Vent (in French)	
Villeneuve d'Ascq	Moulin de Vaudricourt	Moulin Tour en Bois			
Villers-Outréaux	Moulin Lejeune	Moulin Tour		Moulins-a-Vent (in French)	
Walincourt-Selvigny	Moulin Brunet	Moulin Tour	15th century	Moulins-a-Vent (in French)	
Watten	Moulin de la Montagne	Moulin Tour	1731	Moulins-a-Vent (in French)	
Wormhout	Moulin Deschodt; Moulin de la Briarde	Moulin Pivot	1756	Moulins-a-Vent (in French)	
