= Doornzele =

- Village
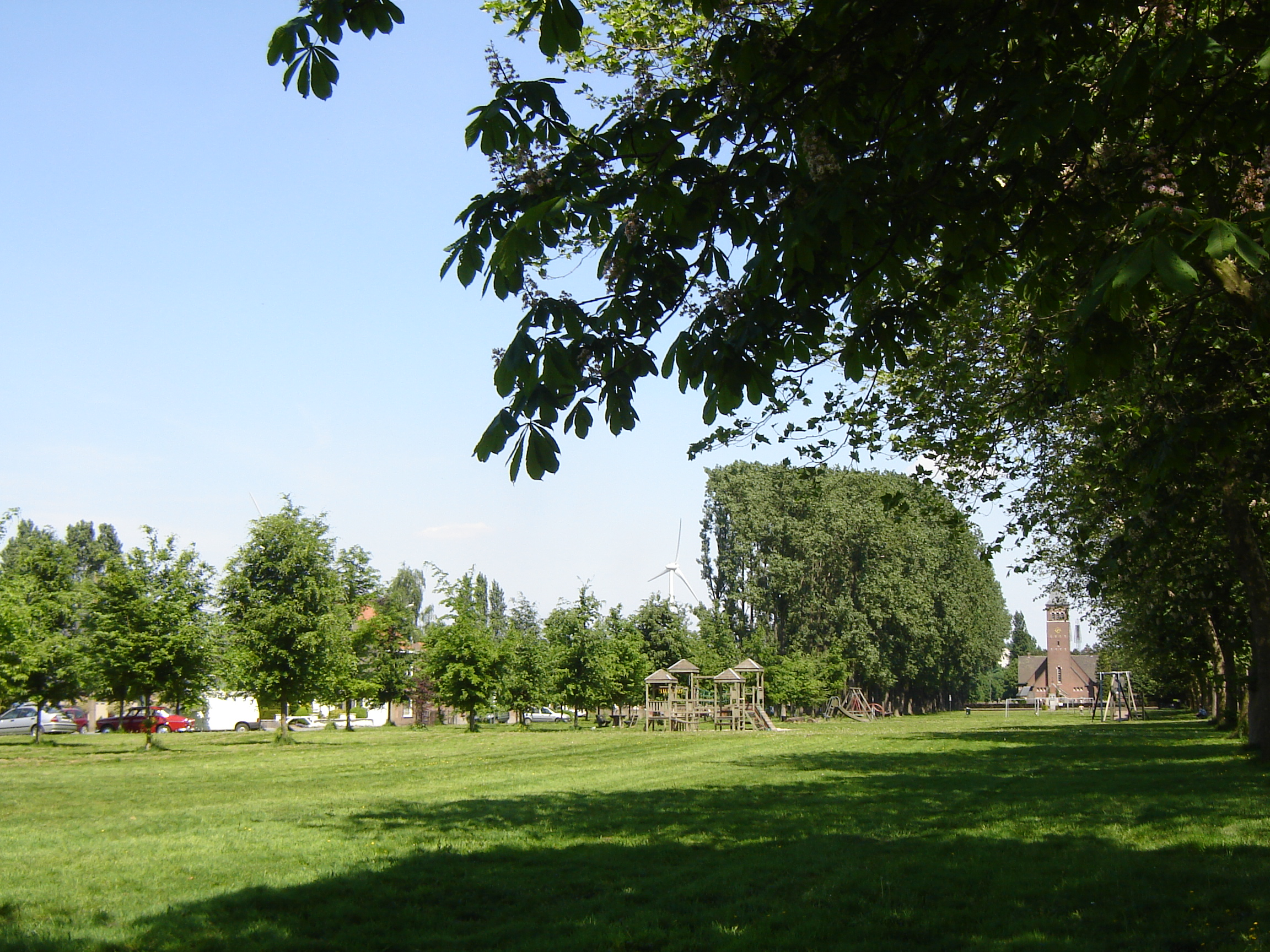
- Dries (village square) of Doornzele

- Location in Belgium
- Coordinates: 51.1431°N 3.7645°E
- Country: Belgium
- Region: Flemish Region
- Province: East Flanders
- Municipality: Evergem

Area
  - Total: 5.36 km^{2} (2.07 sq mi)

Population (2021)
  - Total: 1,847
  - Density: 345/km^{2} (892/sq mi)
- Time zone: CET

Doornzele is a village in the municipality of Evergem in the province of East Flanders, Belgium. The village is notable for its dries (village square or village green) which is one of the largest in Belgium and in near original condition. Doornzele is located on the Ghent–Terneuzen Canal about 11 kilometres (6.8 mi) north of Ghent.

== History ==
Doornzele is known for its dries (village square) which was first attested in 966. The settlement itself was first mentioned in 1337. The dries measures 16 hectares (40 acres) and is 1.5 kilometres (0.93 mi) long. The church is located in the centre and the village has been built around the square.

An abbey of the Benedictine Sisters has been known to exist in Doornzele since 1234. Shortly after, it was joined by Aurea Cella, an abbey of Cistercian nuns. In 1578, the abbeys were destroyed by Calvinists from Ghent. Doornzele was burnt in 1691 by French troops. In 1843, a monastery was established, and Doornzele became an independent parish in 1853. The St Peter and Paul Church was destroyed in 1940, and rebuilt in 1955.

During the 20th century, Doornzele became surrounded by industrial zones and harbours. In 2018, it was decided to construct a park and forest between Doornzele and the harbours as a buffer zone and for recreational purposes.

The grist mill Doornzelemolen was originally a wooden windmill belonging to the abbey. In 1839, the current stone windmill was built. In 1948, the axle broke and it continued to operate on three electric motors until 1970. In 1995, it was bought by the municipality and converted into a cultural centre. The lower floor is used as a cafeteria. The three upper floors function as a Rolle Bolle exposition centre.

== Gallery ==
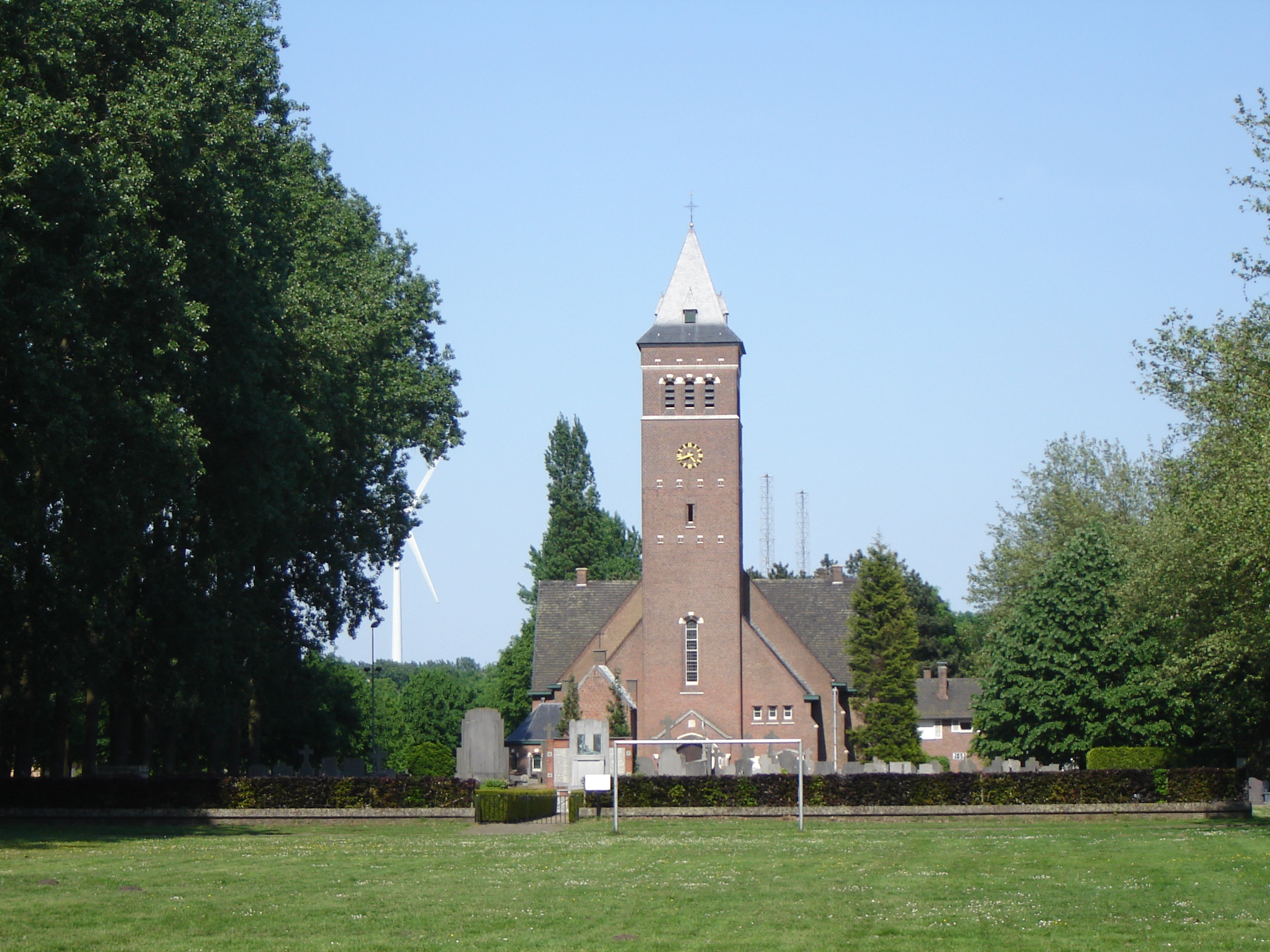
St Peter and Paul Church on the dries

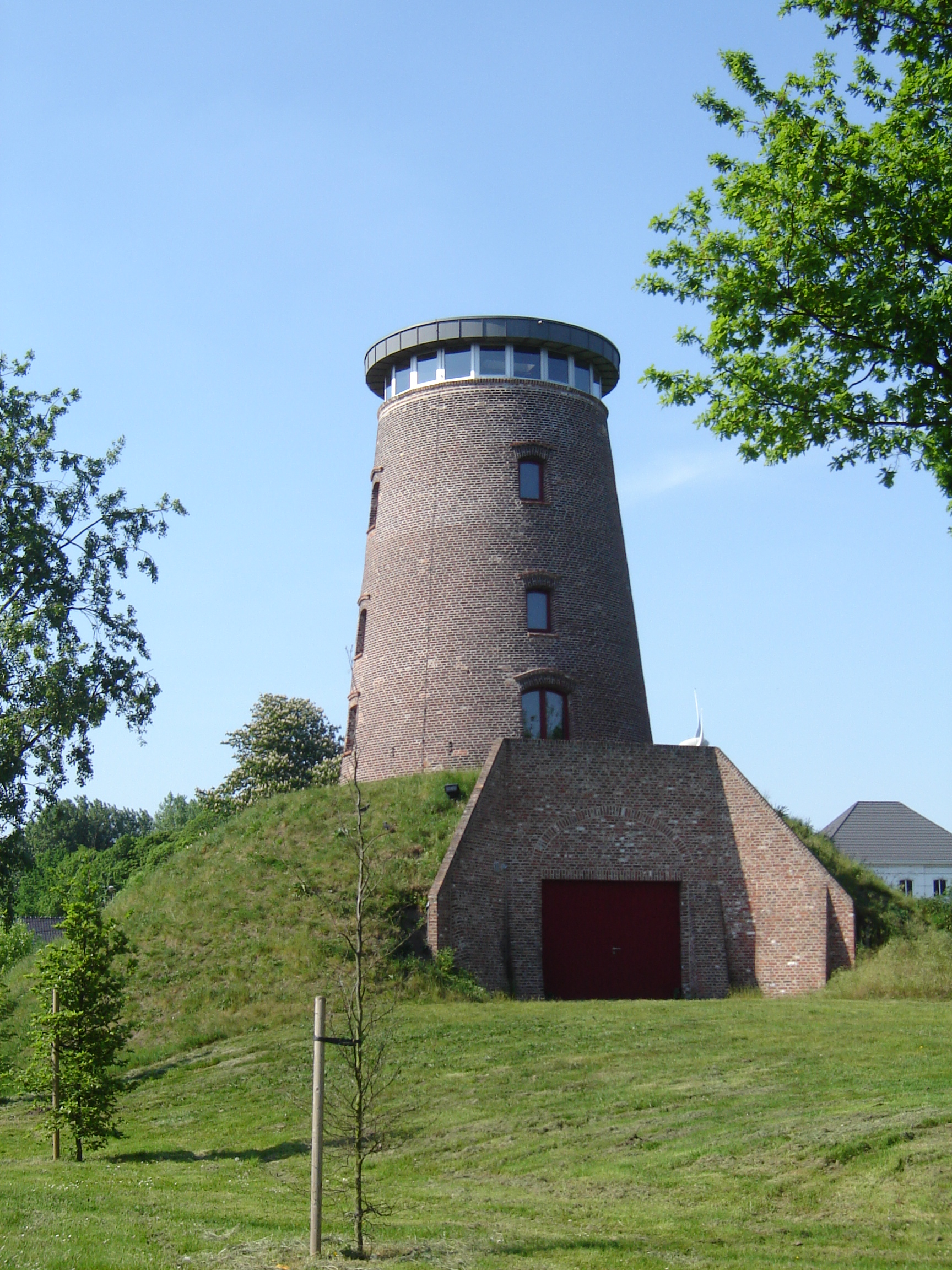
Former windmill Doornzelemolen

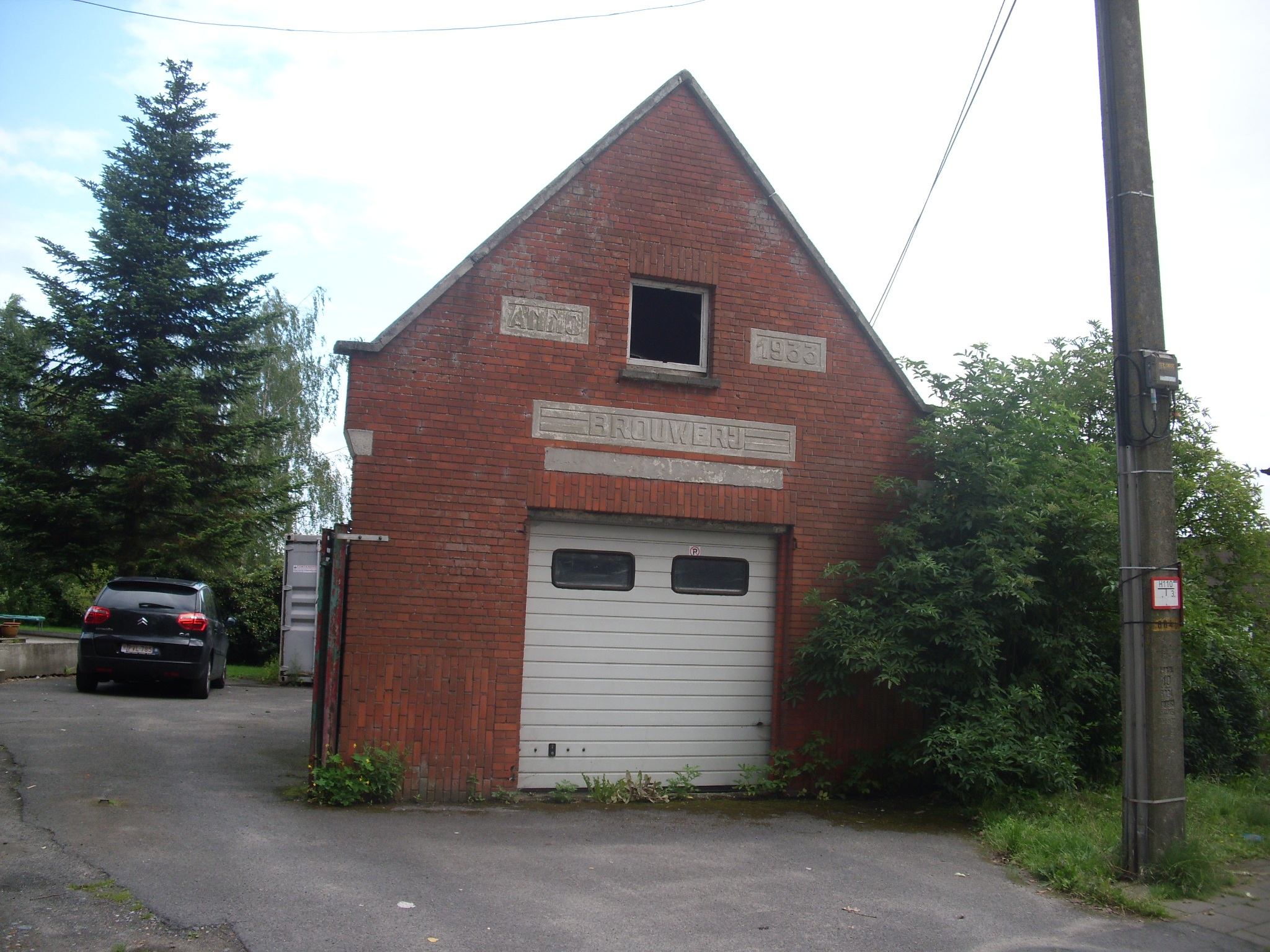
Former brewery

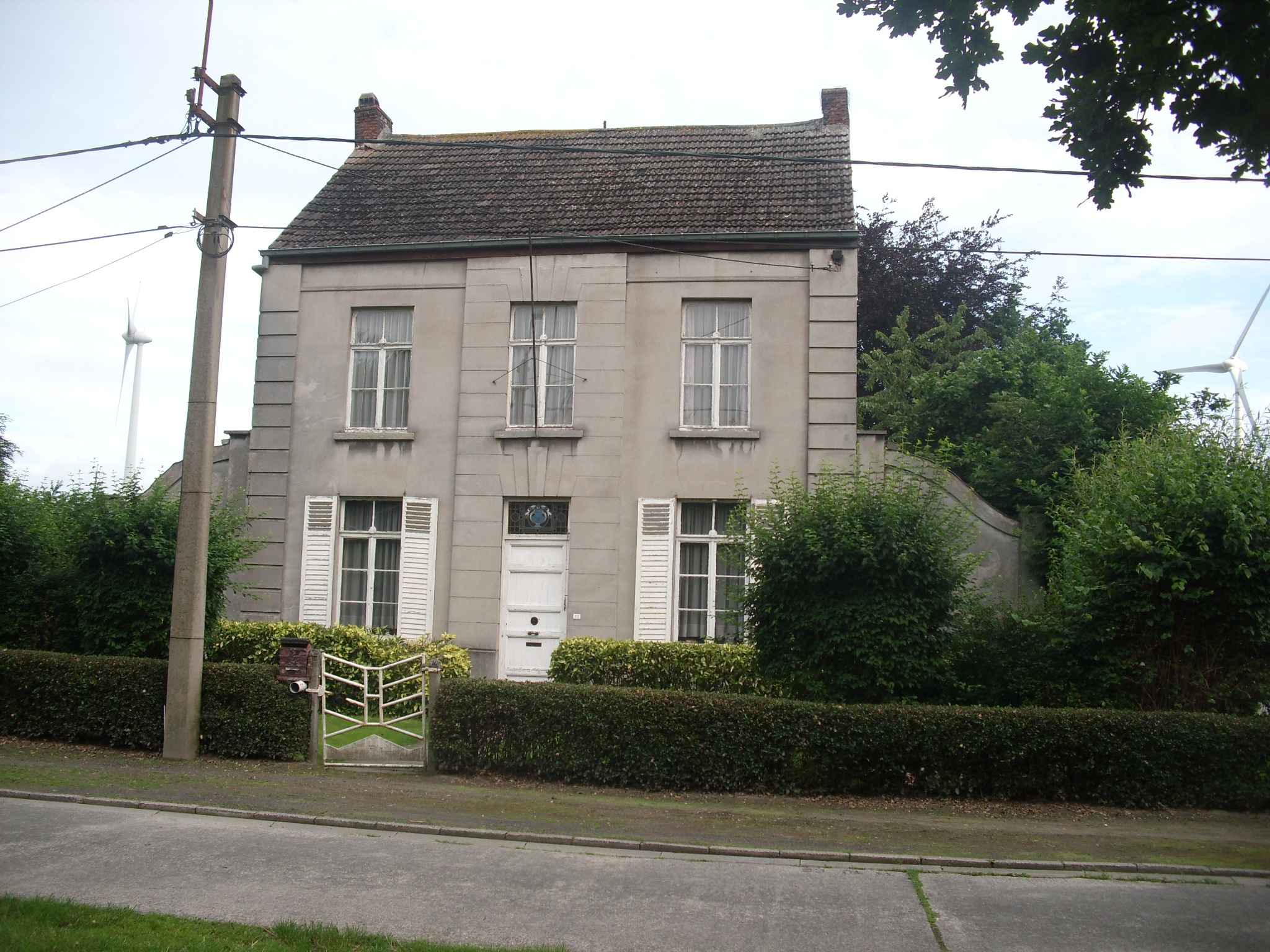
House in Doornzele
