= White Mill =

White Mill, White Mills and White's Mill may refer to:

== United Kingdom ==
=== Windmills ===
- White Mill, Bethersden, a windmill in Kent
- White Mill, Corpusty, a windmill in Norfolk
- White Mill, Croydon, a windmill in Surrey
- White Mill, East Bergholt, a windmill in Suffolk
- White Mill, Eastbourne, a windmill in East Sussex
- White Mill, Epworth, a windmill in Lincolnshire
- White Mill, Felpham, a windmill in West Sussex
- White Mill, Fontwell, a windmill in West Sussex
- White Mill, Forncett St Peter, a windmill in Norfolk
- White Mill, Headcorn, a windmill in Kent
- White Mill, Lyminge, a windmill in Kent
- White Mill, Ore, a windmill in East Sussex
- White Mill, Sandwich, a windmill in Kent
- White Mill, Southwold, a windmill in Suffolk
- White Mill, Stone Cross, a windmill in East Sussex
- White Mill, Southsea, a windmill in Hampshire
- White Mill, Westfield, a windmill in East Sussex
- White Cross Mill, York, a windmill in the North Riding of Yorkshire
- White Top Mill, Mildenhall, a windmill in Suffolk

=== Watermills ===
- White Mill, Sturminster Marshall, a mill near Sturminster Marshall on the River Stour, owned by the National Trust
- White Mill, Sturry, a watermill on the River Stour, Kent

=== Villages ===
- White Mill, Carmarthenshire, a village in Carmarthenshire named after its watermill

== United States ==
- White Mills, Kentucky
- White Mill (White Mills, Kentucky), listed on the NRHP in Kentucky
- White Mills, Pennsylvania
- Old White Mill (Meshoppen, Pennsylvania), listed on the NRHP in Pennsylvania
- White's Mill (Maryville, Tennessee), listed on the National Register of Historic Places in Blount County, Tennessee
- White's Mill (Abingdon, Virginia), listed on the National Register of Historic Places in Washington County, Virginia
- White's Mill (Casa Blanca, Arizona) the trading post and flour mill of Ammi M. White in the Pima Villages at Casa Blanca, Arizona, during the American Civil War.

== Other ==
- White Mills Distillery Company, Louisville, Kentucky, listed on the NRHP in Kentucky
- Whitemill, County Louth, Éire

== See also ==
- Moulin Blanc (disambiguation)
- Witte Molen (disambiguation)
