= Sint-Kornelis-Horebeke =

- Village / Deelgemeente
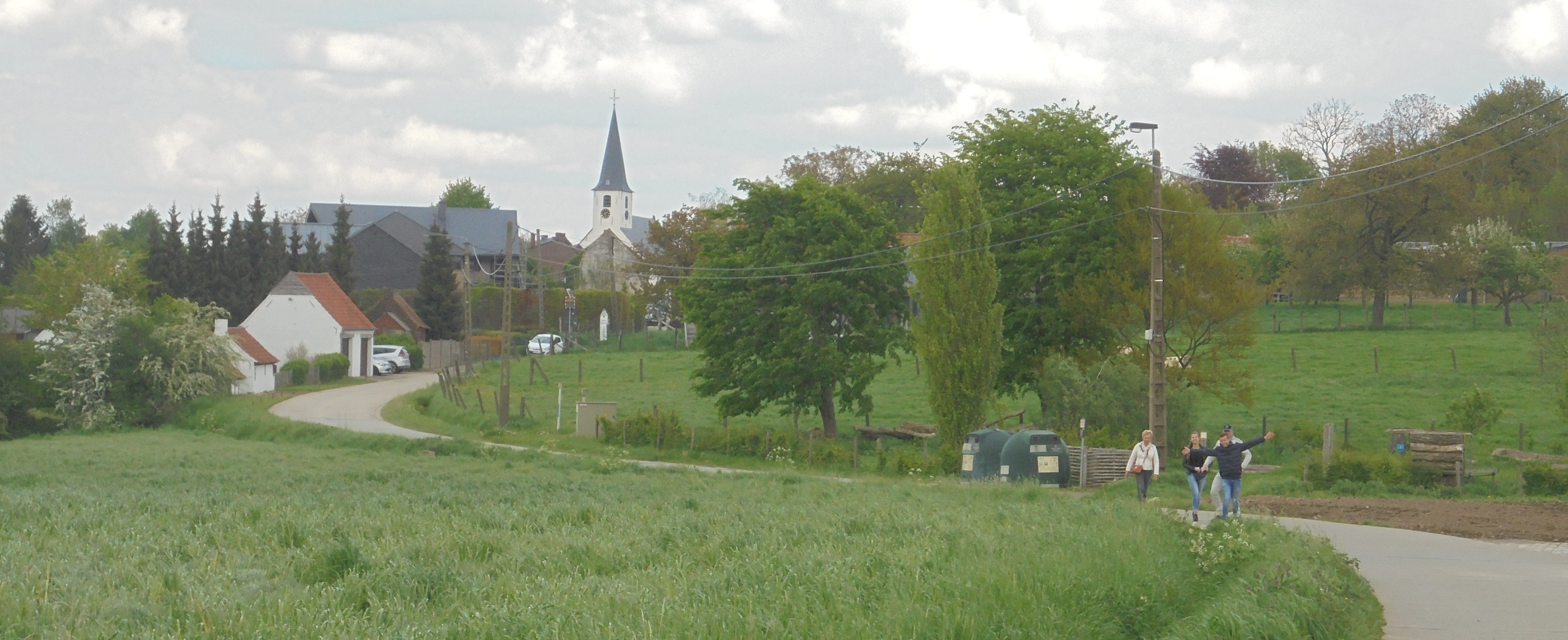
- Church and village view

- Location in Belgium
- Coordinates: 50°50′06″N 3°41′49″E
- Country: Belgium
- Region: Flanders
- Province: East Flanders
- Municipality: Horebeke

Area
  - Total: 3.57 km^{2} (1.38 sq mi)

Population (2020)
  - Total: 541
  - Density: 152/km^{2} (390/sq mi)
- Postal code: 9667

Sint-Kornelis-Horebeke is a village in the Belgian province of East Flanders and a deelgemeente (sub-municipality) of the municipality of Horebeke. It was an independent municipality until the Belgian municipal mergers of 1977. The village lies in the Vlaamse Ardennen (Flemish Ardennes) and has a hilly landscape with small wet stream valleys.

== History ==
The village is first attested in the 12th century (1148). In 1155 it became a separate parish, split from Sint-Maria-Horebeke. Historically the parish patronage belonged to the Onze-Lieve-Vrouwe chapter of Tournai. During the Dutch Revolt both Horebeke villages were centres for the rebel forces; a Protestant community remained present in the area.

== Landmarks ==
- The originally Early Gothic St. Cornelius Church was substantially rebuilt in the 18th century. The church houses a rococo organ (ca. 1777) by Pieter Van Peteghem that was installed in Horebeke in 1782.
- The former Franciscan friary buildings date from the 18th century.
- The Hoogkoutermolen (windmill) is the only one of the three former mills to survive intact.
- Several chapels and a characteristic cobbled road known as the Haaghoek.

== Nature and landscape ==
Sint-Kornelis-Horebeke sits in the Flemish Ardennes with elevations ranging roughly from 37 to 100 m above sea level. The southern part of the village includes part of the Burreken nature reserve, which contains the sources of the Krombeek stream.

== Demographics ==
The village had 541 inhabitants on 1 January 2020 (area 3.57 km²).
