= Huise =

- Village
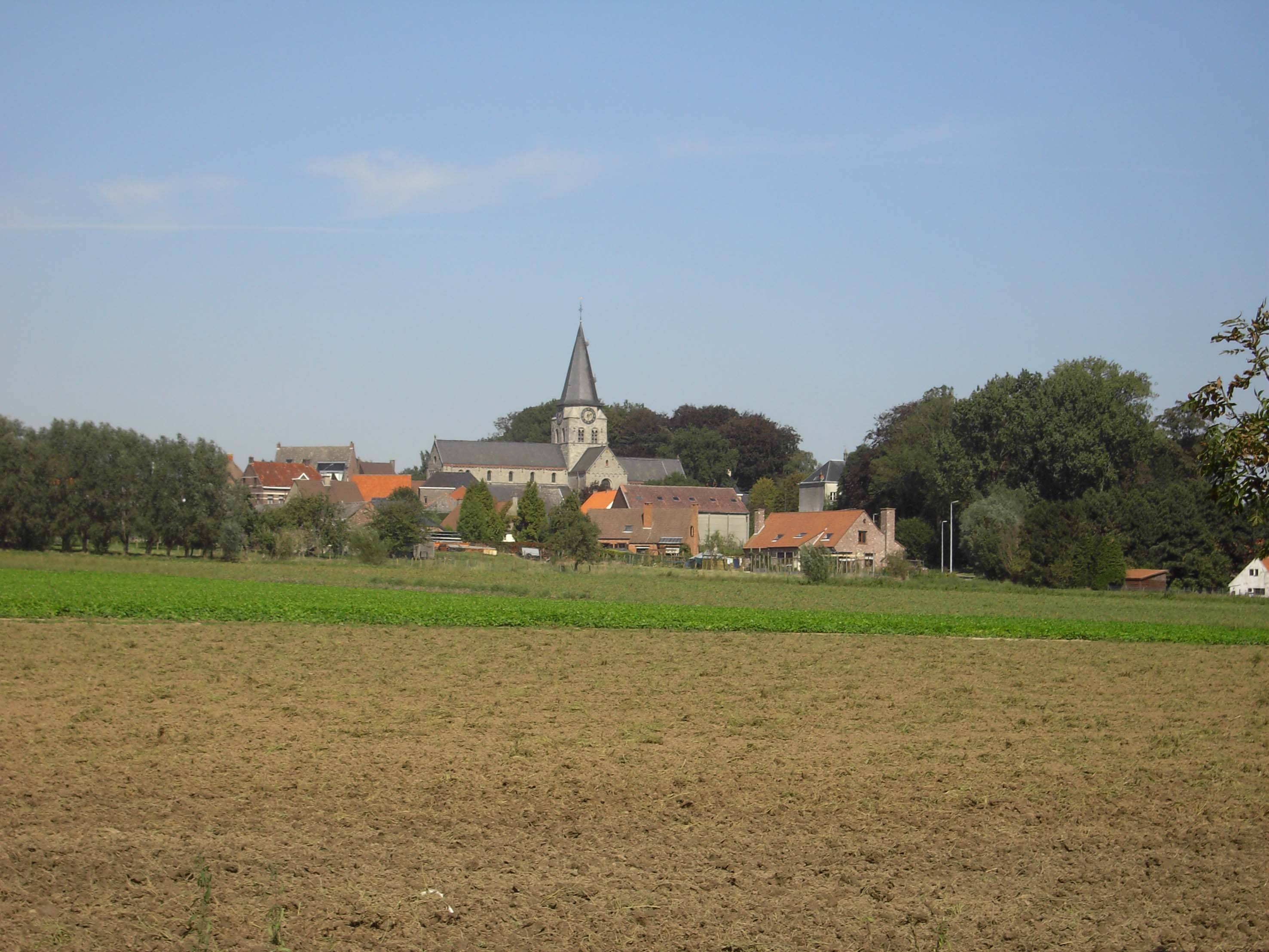
- View of Huise

- Location in Belgium
- Coordinates: 50.8992°N 3.5897°E
- Country: Belgium
- Province: East Flanders
- Municipality: Kruisem

Area
  - Total: 9.98 km^{2} (3.85 sq mi)

Population (2021)
  - Total: 1,761
  - Density: 176/km^{2} (457/sq mi)
- Time zone: CET
- Website: adegem.be

Huise is a village and deelgemeente (sub-municipality) on a hill within the municipality of Kruisem, part of the province of East Flanders in Belgium.

== History ==
It was mentioned in an 877 charter (granting permission to build a church for the village, then part of the parish of Mullem) as 'villa uscias', an incorrect Latinisation of the Indo-Germanic hydronym "usa-ja". Corbie Abbey had major possessions in Huise, donated to them around 825 by their former abbot Adalard of Corbie, who had been born in Huise.

Mainly a farming village, it has also had a linen manufacture since the Middle Ages and has grown flax since the 14th century. In the 16th century the Protestant Reformation gained a huge following in the village and many of its inhabitants emigrated to the Dutch Republic. Its position on the high ground meant it played an important part in the 1708 Battle of Oudenaarde. Agnès della Faille d'Huysse was Huise's mayor from 1927 to 1970. It was merged with Lozer in 1977 boundary reforms and the resulting merged village was re-split, with the centre of Huise becoming part of Zingem municipality and Lozer and the rest of Huise becoming part of Kruishoutem. In 2019, it was merged into the municipality of Kruisem, but remains a deelgemeente (sub-municipality).

The present pseudo-Romanesque parish church of Sint-Petrus-en-Urbanuskerk includes a late 13th century transept - the church as a whole is mainly a product of 18th and 19th century rebuilds, particularly the major modifications in 1889. The Gerlache family owns the Kasteel de Gerlache nearby - the family produced the two Antarctic explorers Adrien de Gerlache and Gaston de Gerlache. The village also includes the Huisekoutermolen windmill, preserved as a historic monument.

== Gallery ==
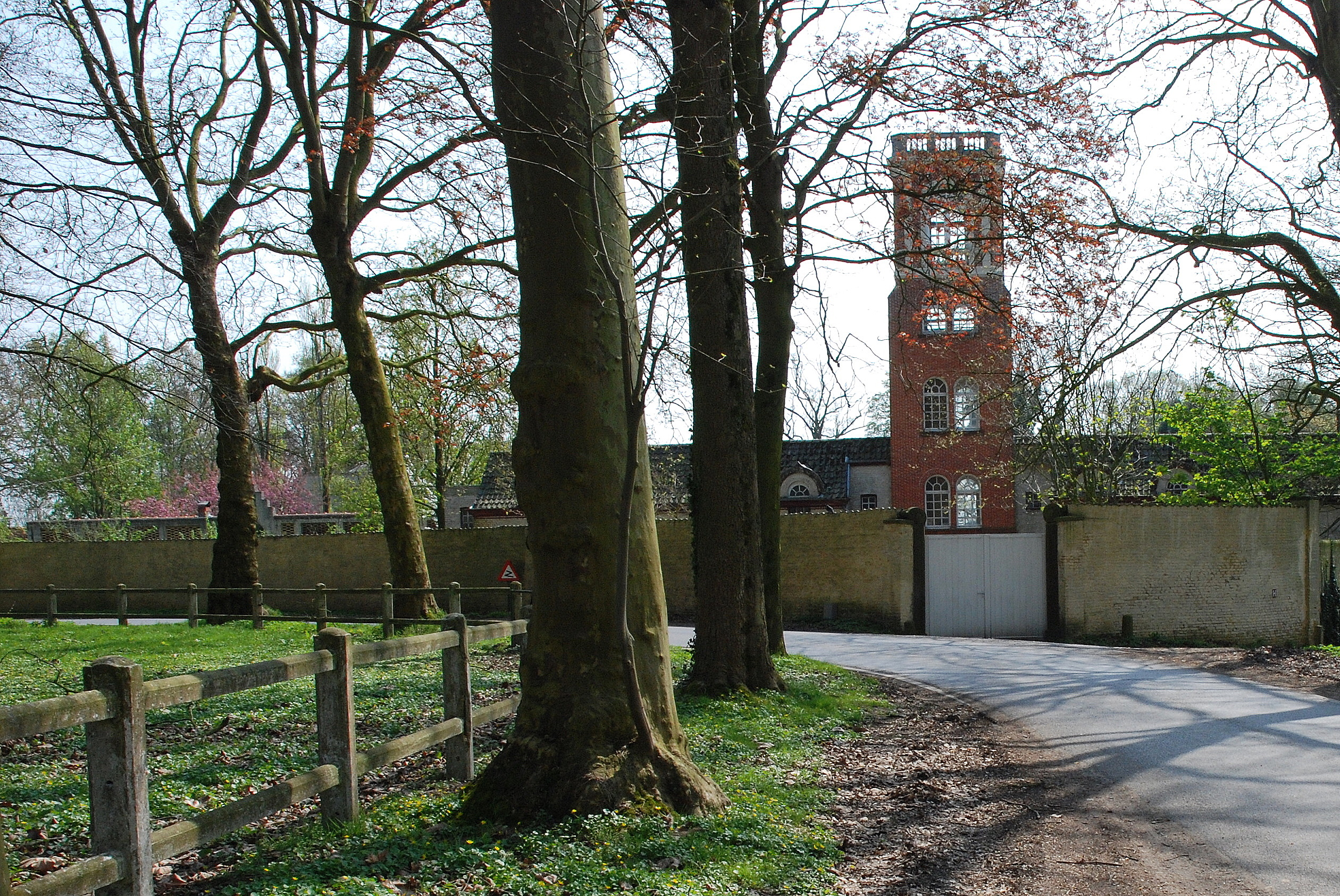
Kasteel de Gerlache

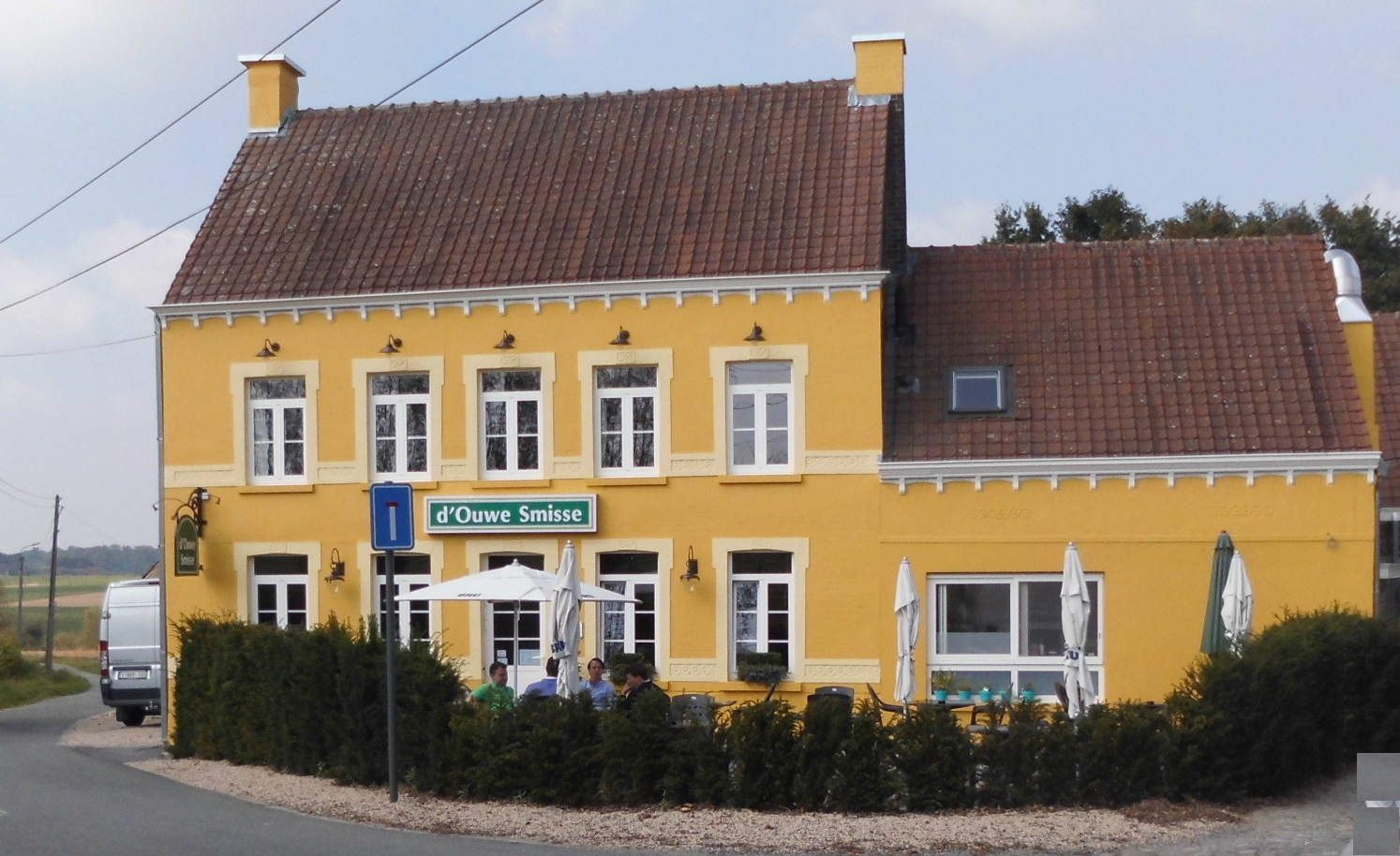
Pub D'Ouwe Smisse

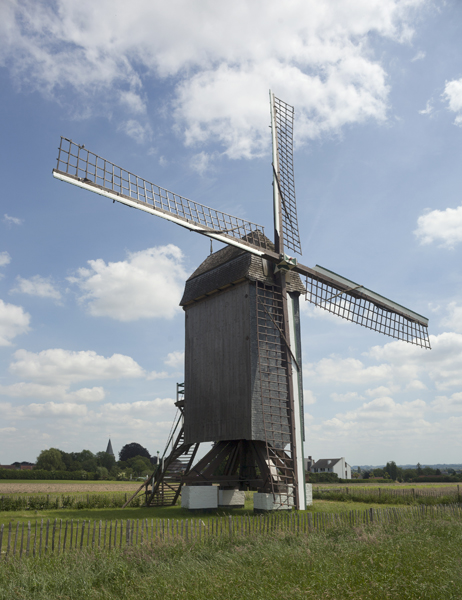
Huisekoutermolen

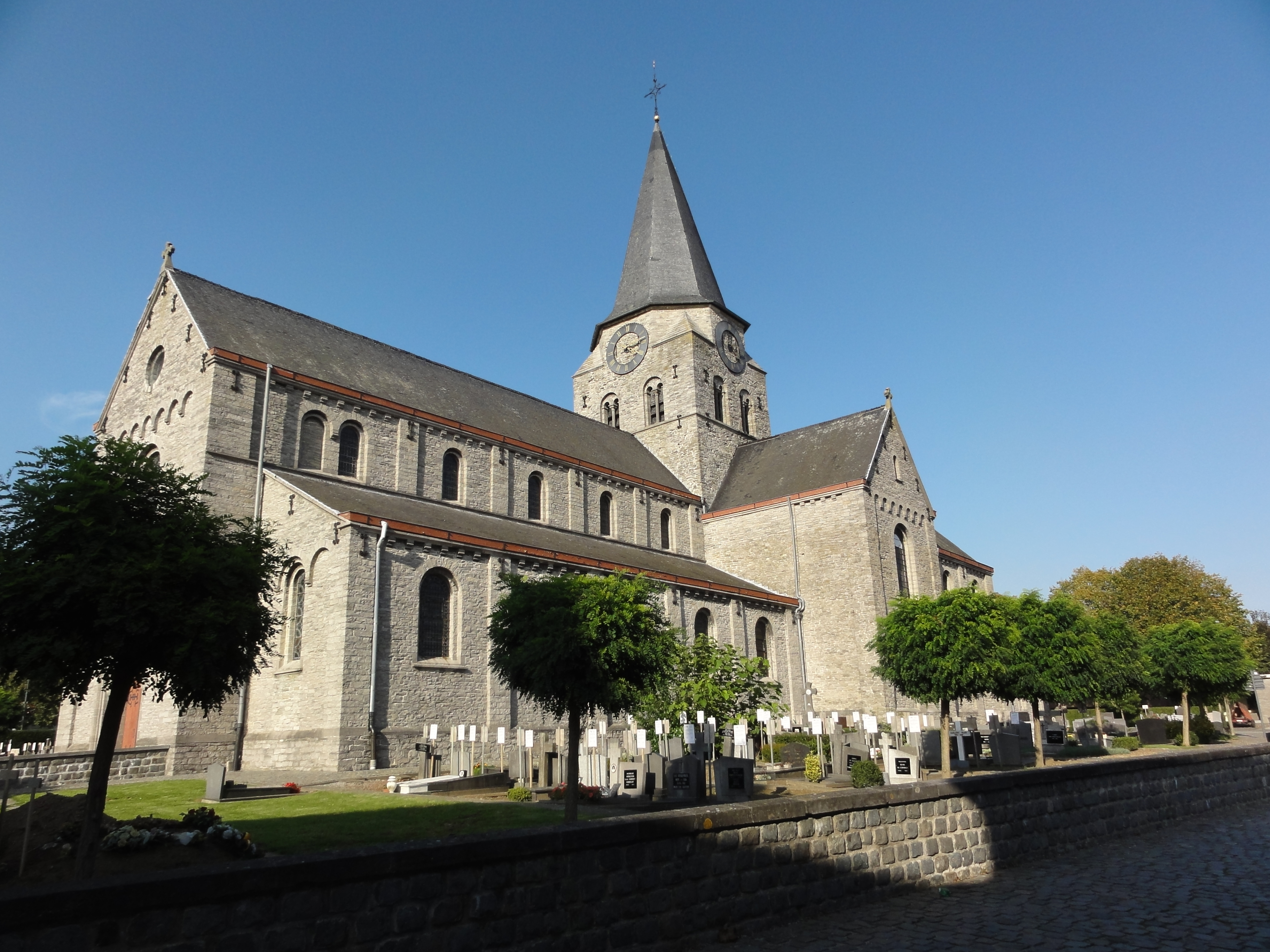
St Peter and Urbanus Church
