= Mendonk =

Sub-municipality of the city of Ghent, Belgium

- Sub-municipality of Ghent
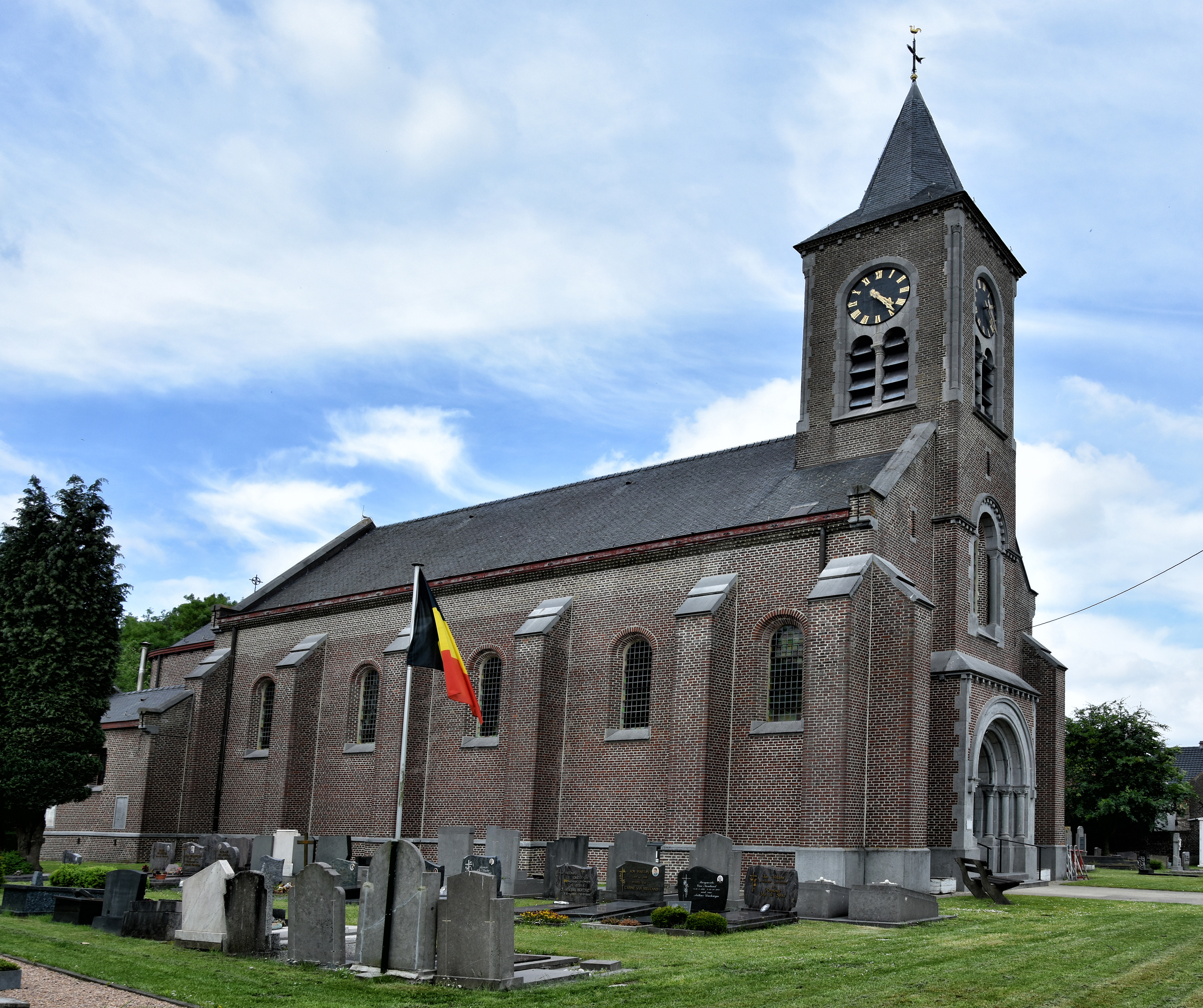
- St Bavo's Church

- Location of Mendonk in Ghent
- Interactive map of Mendonk
- Location within Belgium Location within East Flanders
- Coordinates: 51°08′48″N 3°49′17″E
- Country: Belgium
- Community: Flemish Community
- Region: Flemish Region
- Province: East Flanders
- Arrondissement: Ghent
- Municipality: Ghent

Area
  - Total: 6.29 km^{2} (2.43 sq mi)

Population (2020-01-01)
  - Total: 230
  - Density: 37/km^{2} (95/sq mi)
- Postal codes: 9042
- Area codes: 09

Mendonk (Dutch pronunciation: [ˈmɛndɔŋk]) is a sub-municipality of the city of Ghent located in the province of East Flanders, Flemish Region, Belgium. It was a separate municipality until 1965. In 1927, part of the original municipality was already annexed to Ghent. On 1 January 1965, it was merged into Ghent.

It is situated near the canal that connects the cities of Ghent and Terneuzen, which puts Mendonk in the middle of an industrial area.
