= Horebeke =

Municipality in the Belgian province of East Flanders

- Municipality
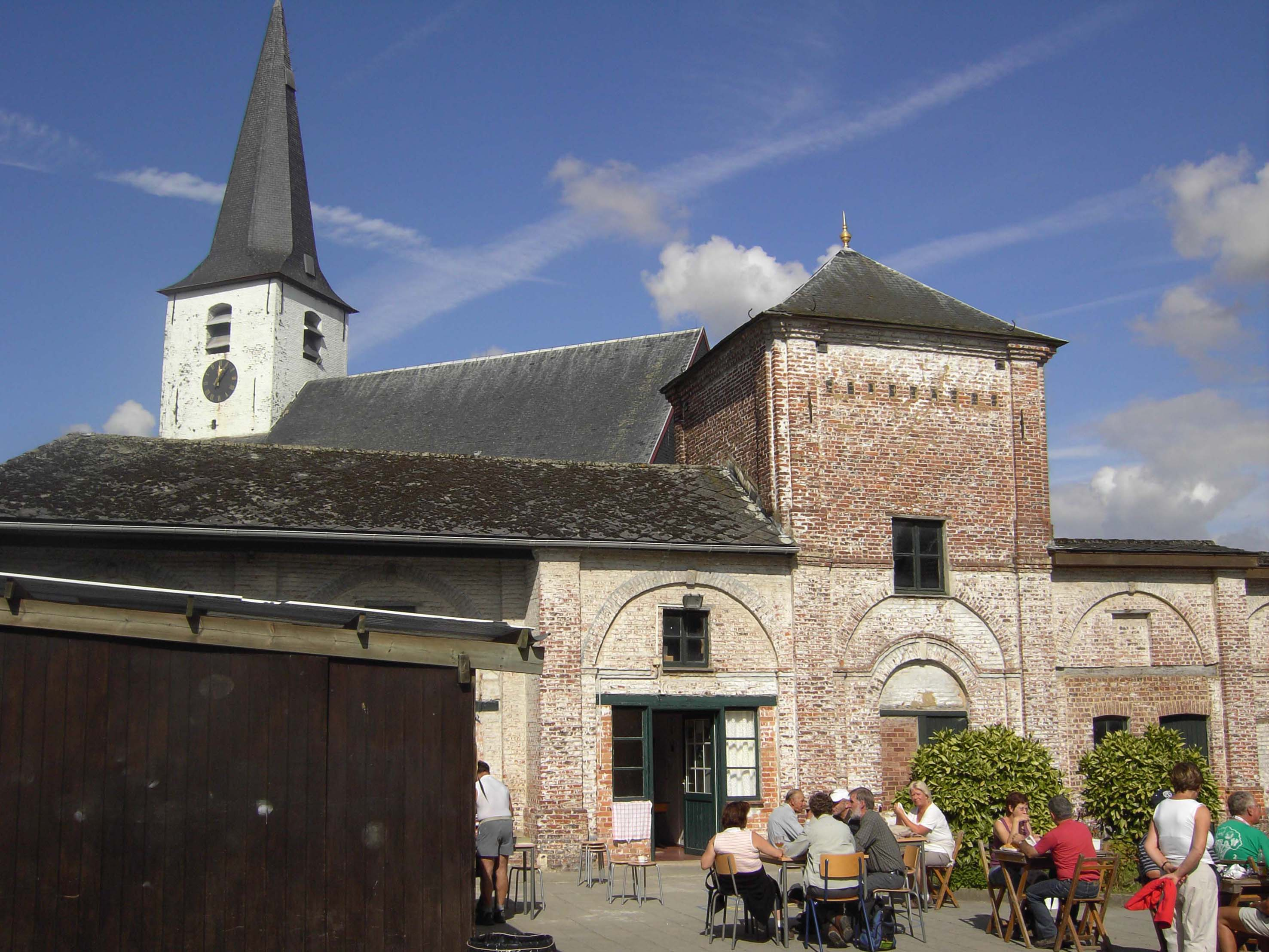
- Church and school of Sint-Kornelis-Horebeke

- Flag Coat of arms

- Location of Horebeke in East Flanders
- Interactive map of Horebeke
- Location in Belgium
- Coordinates: 50°50′N 03°41′E
- Country: Belgium
- Community: Flemish Community
- Region: Flemish Region
- Province: East Flanders
- Arrondissement: Oudenaarde

Government
  - Mayor: Cynthia Browaeys (Volksbelangen)
  - Governing party: Volksbelangen

Area
  - Total: 11.25 km^{2} (4.34 sq mi)

Population (2018-01-01)
  - Total: 2,048
  - Density: 182.0/km^{2} (471.5/sq mi)
- Postal codes: 9667
- NIS code: 45062
- Area codes: 055
- Website: www.horebeke.be

Horebeke (Dutch pronunciation: [ˈɦoːrəbeːkə]) is a municipality located in the Belgian province of East Flanders. The municipality includes the towns of Sint-Kornelis-Horebeke and Sint-Maria-Horebeke, comprising a total area of 11.20 km^{2}. As of 1 January 2018, Horebeke had a total population of 2,048.

The Corsele parish in Sint-Maria-Horebeke has a Protestant church which dates from 1872 and a museum dedicated to Abraham Hans (the former Protestant village teacher and story teller) built in 1812 as a parish school. There have been Protestants in Sint-Maria-Horebeke since the Reformation of the 16th century.

== See also ==
- Zwalm (River)
