= Huisekoutermolen =

Destroyed windmill in Huise, Belgium

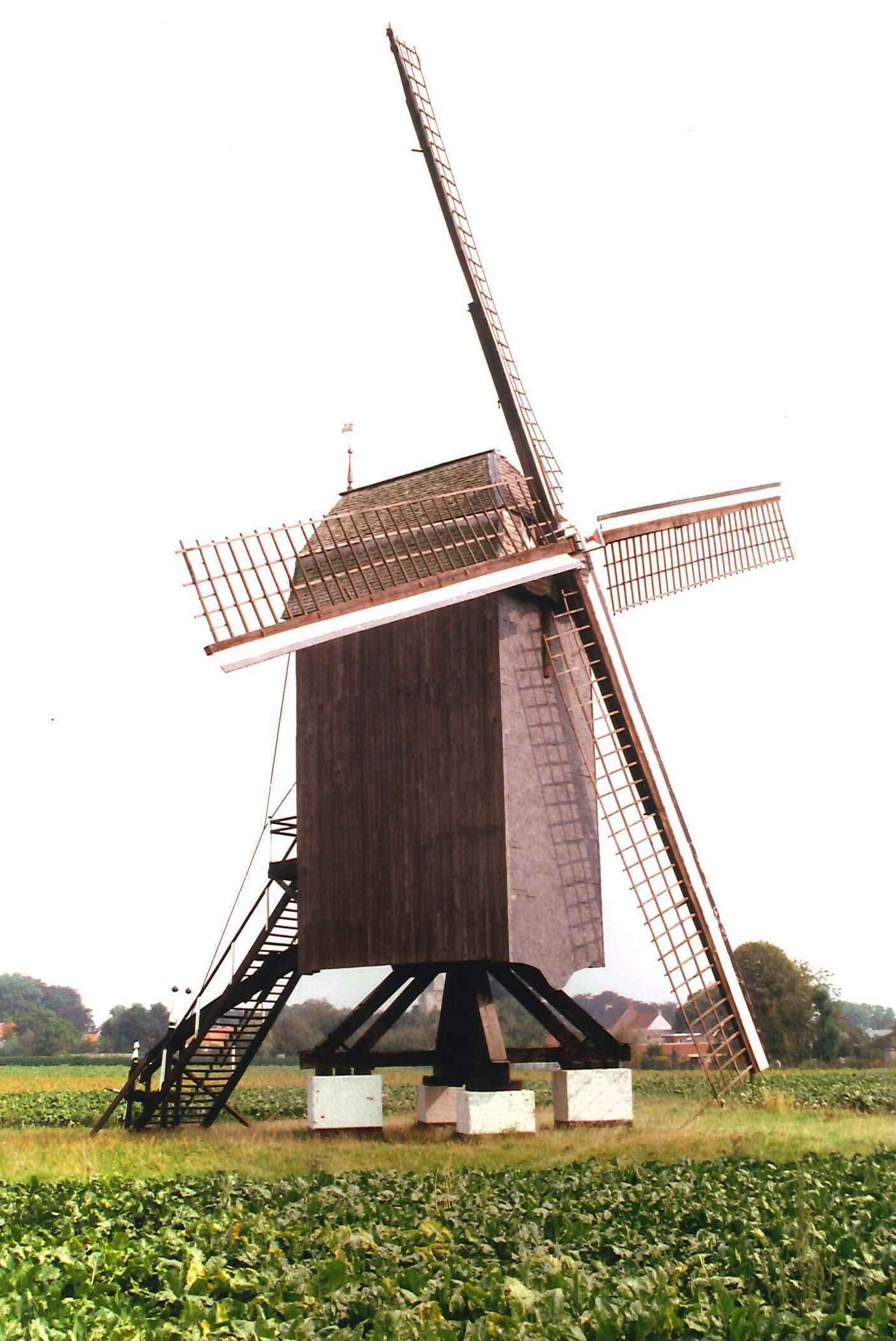
- Huisekoutermolen, September 1999
- Interactive map of Huisekoutermolen

Origin
- Mill name: Huisekoutermolen
- Mill location: Huise, East Flanders, Belgium
- Coordinates: 50°53′57″N 3°35′01″E
- Operator: Oost-Vlaams Molens
- Year built: 1975

Information
- Purpose: Corn mill
- Type: Open trestle post mill
- No. of sails: Four
- Type of sails: Common sails
- Winding: Tailpole
- No. of pairs of millstones: Two pairs
- Year lost: 19 June 2026

The Huisekoutermolen was an open trestle post mill at Huise, East Flanders, Belgium. It was moved from Waregem, West Flanders in 1975 and collapsed on 19 June 2026.

== History ==
The Huisekoutermolen was originally built at Waregem before 1512, where it was known as the Hoogmolen. It was designated a protected monument in 1944. The mill was registered as of beschermd erfgoed, number 74522. The mill was sold in 1971, and moved to Huise and rebuilt between 1972 and 1975. The work was done by millwright Walter Mariman of Zele. It was erected on the site of a snuff mill which had burnt down in 1850. In 2001, the mill became unworkable due to problems with the sails, one of which subsequently broke. The sails were removed in 2007. The mill was leased by Oost-Vlaams Molens in 2010 and returned to working order in 2012. It was used to train millers in the art of milling. On 19 June 2026, the mill blew down in a thunderstorm. Photographs show that the mill's main post snapped at the point where the quarterbars joined it. Vlaamse Molens stated that the mill would be rebuilt.

== Description ==
The Huisekoutermolen was an open trestle post mill with four Common sails. It drove two pairs of millstones, arranged head and tail.
