= List of windmills in Hainaut (province) =

A list of windmills in the Belgian province of Hainaut.

Location	Name of mill	Type	Built	Notes	Photograph
Antoing	Moulin de Bruyelles	Grondzeiler			
Audregnies	Moulin Moustache	Grondzeiler	19th century	Molenechos (in Dutch)	
Bassilly	Moulin à Briques; Moulin du Sart	Stellingmolen	1780	Molenechos (in Dutch)	
Blaton	Moulin de la Folie	Grondzeiler	1885	Molenechos (in Dutch)	
Braine-le-Comte	Moulin Dubois; Moulin Jeanette	Stellingmolen	Late 18th century	Molenechos (in Dutch)	
Brasménil	Moulin Grard; Moulin Bertot	Grondzeiler	1769	Molenechos (in Dutch)	
Buvrinnes	Moulin Duart	Grondzeiler	1750	Molenechos (in Dutch)	
Chercq	Moulin des Sottises	Grondzeiler	1679	Molenechos (in Dutch)	
Comines	Moulin Soete; Souete Molen	Staakmolen	2001	Molenechos (in Dutch)	
Deux-Acren	Moulin Poylte	Grondzeiler	1789	Molenechos (in Dutch)	
Ellezelles	Moulin du Cat Sauvage; Kattenmolen	Staakmolen	1750	Molenechos (in Dutch)	
Ellezelles	Blanc Moulin; Moulin de la Rygaudrye	Grondzeiler	c. 1805	Molenechos (in Dutch)	
Ellezelles	Moulin Delattre	Grondzeiler	c. 1805	Molenechos (in Dutch)	
Estinnes-au-Mont	Moulin des Trieux	Grondzeiler	1815	Molenechos (in Dutch)	
Farciennes	Moulin du Louat	Grondzeiler	1818	Molenechos (in Dutch)	
Fleurus	Moulin Naveau	Stellingmolen	Late 18th century	Molenechos (in Dutch)	
Flobecq	Moulin Liénart	Grondzeiler	1786	Ruin, part of wall only remaining Molenechos (in Dutch)	
Frasnes-lez-Gosselies	Moulin Druez	Grondzeiler	1834	Molenechos (in Dutch)	
Frasnes-lez-Gosselies	Moulin Debilde	Grondzeiler	1844	Molenechos (in Dutch)	
Gouy-lez-Piéton	Moulin Pétiaux	Grondzeiler	Early 19th century	Molenechos (in Dutch)	
Grand-Reng	Moulin Degang	Grondzeiler	1714	Molenechos (in Dutch)	
Grand-Reng	Moulin à Cricq	Grondzeiler	19th century	Molenechos (in Dutch)	
Harchies	Moulin Degand; Moulin St-Roch	Grondzeiler	1830	Molenechos (in Dutch)	
Hautrage	Moulin des Culz tout Nudz; Moulin Hecq	Grondzeiler	17th century	Molenechos (in Dutch)	
Hennuyères	Moulin du Hennuyères	Grondzeiler	19th century	Molenechos (in Dutch)	
Heppignies	Moulin du Bois; Moulin Bauloye	Grondzeiler	1826	Molenechos (in Dutch)	
Heppignies	Moulin Wyaux	Grondzeiler	1844	Molenechos (in Dutch)	
Hornu	Moulin de Briques	Grondzeiler	Late 18th century	Molenechos (in Dutch)	
Horrues	Moulin Rombaux	Stellingmolen	1830	Molenechos (in Dutch)	
Houdeng-Aimeries	Moulin du Ya; Moulin Collet; Moulin d'Althanasse Ghislain	Grondzeiler	19th century	Molenechos (in Dutch)	
Jumet	Moulin Hembise	Grondzeiler	1813	Molenechos (in Dutch)	
Laplaigne	Moulin Blanc; Moulin Favacque	Grondzeiler	19th century	Molenechos (in Dutch)	
Lessines	Grand Moulin; Moulin Dooms	Stellingmolen	1834	Molenechos (in Dutch)	
Leval-Trahegnies	Moulin Stoclet	Grondzeiler	Late 18th century	Molenechos (in Dutch)	
Luingne	Moulin de Tombrouck; Tombroekmolen	Grondzeiler	1905	Molenechos (in Dutch)	
Maisières	Moulin Thomas	Grondzeiler	19th century	Molenechos (in Dutch)	
Marquain	Moulin Cornille	Grondzeiler	c. 1883	Molenechos (in Dutch)	
Maubray	Moulin Allard	Grondzeiler	19th century	Molenechos (in Dutch)	
Maubray	Moulin Maugré	Bergmolen	19th century	Molenechos (in Dutch)	
Meslin-l'Evêque	Moulin Lescot; Moulin de la Folie	Grondzeiler	c. 1845	Molenechos (in Dutch)	
Mignault	Le Petit Moulin	Grondzeiler	Late 19th century	Molenechos (in Dutch)	
Moulbaix	Moulin de la Marquise	Staakmolen	c. 1752	Molenechos (in Dutch)	
Obaix	Moulin d'Obaix	Grondzeiler	1835	Molenechos (in Dutch)	
Obigies	Moulin de Barbissart	Grondzeiler	1817	Molenechos (in Dutch)	
Ostiches	Le Blanc Moulin	Bergmolen	1789	Molenechos (in Dutch)	
Papignies		Staakmolen		Moved to Pamel, Flemish Brabant in 1773. Hubert de Bolle (in Dutch)	
Papignies	Moulin de Papignies; Moulin Privé; Moulin Jules	Grondzeiler	1865	Molenechos (in Dutch)	
Pérronnes-lez-Antoing	Moulin de Pérronnes	Grondzeiler	19th century	Molenechos (in Dutch)	
Péruwelz	Moulin Leroy; Moulin de la Loquette	Grondzeiler	1788	Molenechos (in Dutch)	
Quevaucamps	Moulin d'en Haut	Grondzeiler	Early 19th century	Molenechos (in Dutch)	
Roucourt	Moulin Saint-Roch	Grondzeiler	19th century	Molenechos (in Dutch)	
Saint-Amand	Moulin de Chassart	Bergmolen	1831	Molenechos (in Dutch)	
Saint-Sauveur	Moulin de Valentin; Moulin de Muen	Staakmolen	1952	Molenechos (in Dutch)	
Saint-Sauvuer	Moulin Dupont	Achtkante Molen	1971	Molenechos (in Dutch)	
Stambruges	Moulin Colmant	Grondzeiler	1834	Molenechos (in Dutch)	
Stambruges	Moulin Frison; Moulin Marie Tourond	Grondzeiler	Early 18th century	Molenechos (in Dutch)	
Stambruges	Moulin Patin; Moulin Leroy	Grondzeiler	1828	Molenechos (in Dutch)	
Thimougies	Moulin de Thimougies	Staakmolen	1789	Molenechos (in Dutch)	
Tournai	Moulin du Crampon; Moulin Buques	Grondzeiler	1835	Molenechos (in Dutch)	
Tournai	Moulin à Cailloux; Moulin Lehon; Moulin de Pierre	Grondzeiler	Mid-19th century	Molenechos (in Dutch)	
Ville-Pommeroeul	Moulin Baudour	Stellingmolen	Early 19th century	Molenechos (in Dutch)	
Villers-Perwin	Le Moulin	Grondzeiler	19th century	Molenechos (in Dutch)	
Wadelincourt	Moulin Robertau	Grondzeiler	1772	Molenechos (in Dutch)	
Warcoing	Moulin de Pierre; Moulin Mille	Grondzeiler	Late 15th century	Molenechos (in Dutch)	
Wiers	Moulin de Vergne	Grondzeiler	19th century	Molenechos (in Dutch)	

== Notes ==
Bold indicates a mill that is still standing. Italics indicates a mill with some remains surviving.
