= List of windmills in Antwerp (province) =

A list of windmills in Antwerp Province, Belgium.

Location	Name of mill	Type	Built	Notes	Photograph
Aartselaar	Heimolen	Staakmolen	1801	Molenechos (in Dutch)	
Antwerp	Molen van Sint-Anneke; Molen van 't Veertje; De Molen	Staakmolen	2000	Molenechos (in Dutch)	
Antwerp	Volmolen	Achtkante Molen			
Antwerp		Staakmolen			
Arendonk	Toremansmolen; De Toreman; Steendonker; Smoutmolen	Achtkante Molen	1809	Molenechos (in Dutch)	
Baarle-Hertog	Molen Loots	Bergmolen	1834	Molenechos (in Dutch)	
Balen	Topmolen	Achtkante molen		Onroerend Erfgoed (in Dutch)	
Berendrecht	Buitenmolen; Westmolen	Stellingmolen	1822	Molenechos (in Dutch)	
Boechout	Den Steenen Molen	Stellingmolen	1782	Molenechos (in Dutch)	
Bouwel	Molen van Bouwel	Staakmolen	1791	Molenechos (in Dutch)	
Brasschaat	Katerheidmolen	Stellingmolen	1774	Molenechos (in Dutch)	
Brecht	Stenen Molen; Bounke-Bounke	Bergmolen	1842	Molenechos (in Dutch)	
Brecht	Akkermolen	Staakmolen			
Essen	Bakkersmolen	Stellingmolen	1981	Molenechos (in Dutch)	
Essen	Heidemolen; Molen van Aerden	Bergmolen	1841	Molenechos (in Dutch)	
Essen	Molen van Hoek	Bergmolen	19th century	Molenechos (in Dutch)	
Geel	Molen van Larum	Staakmolen	1846	Molenechos (in Dutch)	
Geel	Molen van het Veld	Staakmolen	1993	Molenechos (in Dutch)	
Geel	Gansakkermolen	Staakmolen	1797	Dismantled 2016. Rebuilt at Puurs-Sint-Amands 2023-24. Molenechos, Onroerend Erfgoed Both (in Dutch)	
Gierle	In Stormen Sterk	Grondzeiler	1837	Molenechos (in Dutch)	
Heist-op-den-Berg	Kaasstrooimolen	Staakmolen	1611	Molenechos (in Dutch)	
Hoogstraten	Salm-Salm Molen	Bergmolen	1902	Molenechos (in Dutch)	
Hoogstraten	Nieuwe Molen	Bergmolen	1843	Molenechos (in Dutch)	
Kalmthout		Bergmolen	1884	Onroerend Erfgoed (in Dutch)	
Kasterlee	Keeses Molen	Staakmolen	1954	Originally built at Heist-op-den-Berg in 1853; Molenechos (in Dutch)	
Kasterlee	Oostmolen; Beermolen	Bergmolen	1875	Molenechos (in Dutch)	
Kasterlee	Zwarte Molen	Grondzeiler	1843	Molenechos (in Dutch)	
Kessel	Stenen Molen	Bergmolen	1842	Molenechos (in Dutch)	
Lille	Molen van Goubergen; De Zwarte Molen	Grondzeiler	1863	Molenechos (in Dutch)	
Lille	Molen Verellen; Molen Embrechts; De Witte Molen	Grondzeiler	1841	Molenechos (in Dutch)	
Lillo	De Eenhoorn; De Witte Molen	Stellingmolen	1735	Molenechos (in Dutch)	
Mechelen	Nieuwe Schorsmolen; Molen van Meeusen	Stellingmolen	1734	Molenechos (in Dutch)	
Meerhout	Haenvense Molen	Staakmolen	1943	Molenechos (in Dutch)	
Meerhout	Prinskensmolen	Staakmolen			
Meerle	Heimeulen; Molen van Mertens	Bergmolen	1840	Molenechos (in Dutch)	
Meerle	Molen van Dun	Bergmolen	1895	Molenechos (in Dutch)	
Merksplas	Moermolen	Stellingmolen	1840	Molenechos (in Dutch)	
Mol	Molen van Ezaart	Grondzeiler	1856	Molenechos (in Dutch)	
Nijlen	Molen Verbist	Stellingmolen	1847	Molenechos (in Dutch)	
Nijlen	Molen Dom	Bergmolen	1856	Molenechos (in Dutch)	
Noorderwijk	Hogewegmolen	Staakmolen	1841	Molenechos (in Dutch)	
Oelegem	Molen van Oelegem	Bergmolen	1845	Molenechos (in Dutch)	
Oevel	Molen van 't Roosje	Bergmolen	1878	Molenechos, Onroeremd Erfgoed both (in Dutch)	
Olen	Buulmolen; Hoogbuulmolen	Staakmolen	1744	Molenechos (in Dutch)	
Oud-Turnhout	Molen van Steenbergen	Bergmolen	1596	Molenechos (in Dutch)	
Pulderbos	Stenen Molen	Bergmolen	1840	Molenechos (in Dutch)	
Putte	Stenen Molen	Bergmolen	1844	Molenechos (in Dutch)	
Ranst	Molen van den Kinschot; Molen Rijmenants	Stellingmolen	1858	Molenechos (in Dutch)	
Ravels	De Nachtegaal der Maatvennen	Bergmolen	1869	Molenechos (in Dutch)	
Retie	De Heerser	Staakmolen	1934	Originally built in Arendonk in 1794. Molenechos (in Dutch)	
Rijkevorsel	Stenen Molen	Bergmolen	1862	Molenechos (in Dutch)	
Schoten	Stenen Molen	Stellingmolen	1902	Molenechos (in Dutch)	
Stabroek	Molen van Looveren	Stellingmolen	1870	Molenechos (in Dutch)	
Tongerlo	Beddermolen; Bedderenmolen	Staakmolen	1723	Molenechos (in Dutch)	
Turnhout	Grote Bentel; Molen van Coppens	Bergmolen	1848	Molenechos (in Dutch)	
Turnhout	Goormolen; Oosthovense Molen	Stellingmolen	1786	Molenechos (in Dutch)	
Viersel	Zeldenrust	Stellingmolen	1986	Molenechos (in Dutch)	
Weelde	Arbeid Adelt	Stellingmolen	1906	Molenechos (in Dutch)	
Weert	Dievenmolentje	Grondzeiler	1846	Molenechos (in Dutch)	
Westmalle	Scherpenbergmolen	Bergmolen	1843	Molenechos (in Dutch)	
Wommelgem	Biermansmolen	Stellingmolen			
Wuustwezel	Molen van Hoydonck	Bergmolen	1901	Molenechos (in Dutch)	

== Notes ==
Bold indicates a mill that is still standing. Italics indicates a mill with some remains surviving.
