= Feather bowling =

Target sport

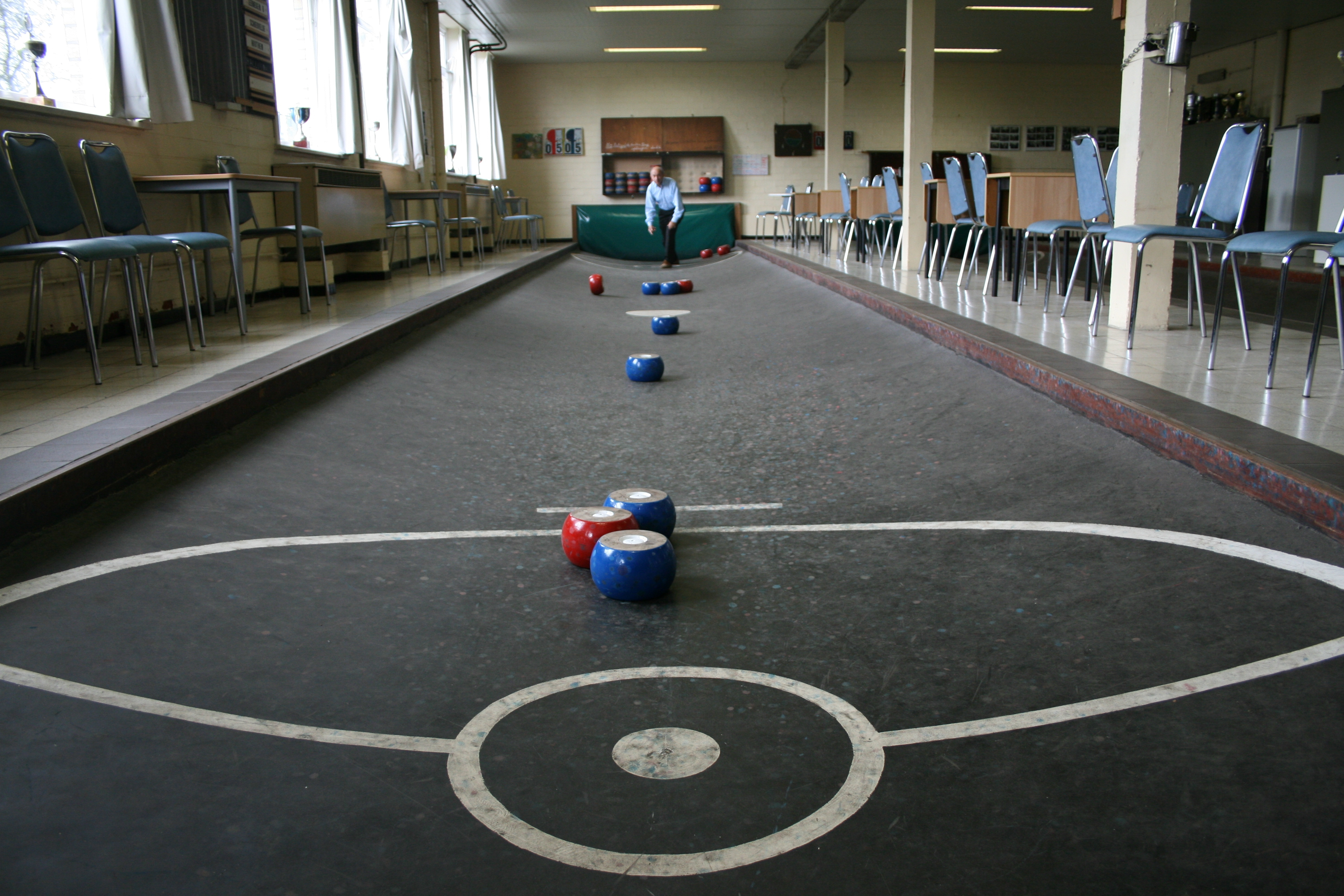
- A featherbowling lane

Characteristics
- Contact: Non-contact
- Type: Bowling, boules
- Equipment: Balls, feather

Presence
- Olympic: No

Feather bowling is a game played with wooden balls shaped in a similar way to cheese wheels. It closely resembles the Scottish sport of curling. The game has its origins in western Flanders, Belgium, where it is known as Trabollen.

== Rules ==
Players inspect the balls to determine points at the end of a round

The balls are rolled down a trough shaped dirt or synthetic alley towards a feather that sticks out at a spot located approximately six feet from each lane end. The object of the game is to get the ball as close to the feather as possible. Teams take turns rolling 12 balls (6 for each team) and may knock their opponent's balls out of the way, similar to Bocce. A coin flip determines which team rolls first.

Typically, once this first team rolls two or three balls close to the feather, they roll the remainder of their balls so as to stop progressively shorter up the alley. This forces the team that rolls second to throw the balls in a manner that uses the curvature of the lane to weave around the "blocks", similar to a sine wave, in order to be able to get closer to the feather than the first team. The team with a ball or balls closest to the feather at the end of the round is awarded 1 point for each ball that is closer than the opponent's nearest ball. In the United States, scoring points is not dependent on their location in relation to the feather, other than being closer than the opponent's balls. No extra points are awarded for landing on the feather, which is placed as a visual guide. The game is over when one team scores 10 points.

== Championships ==
A featherbowling championship was held in Marseille, France, on September 17, 2015. There is a yearly championship awarded to the victor of the league at the Cadieux Cafe in Detroit, Michigan.

== See also ==
- Rolle Bolle, which uses a similar ball but the court is flat.
