= Looberghe =

Looberghe Loberge
- Commune
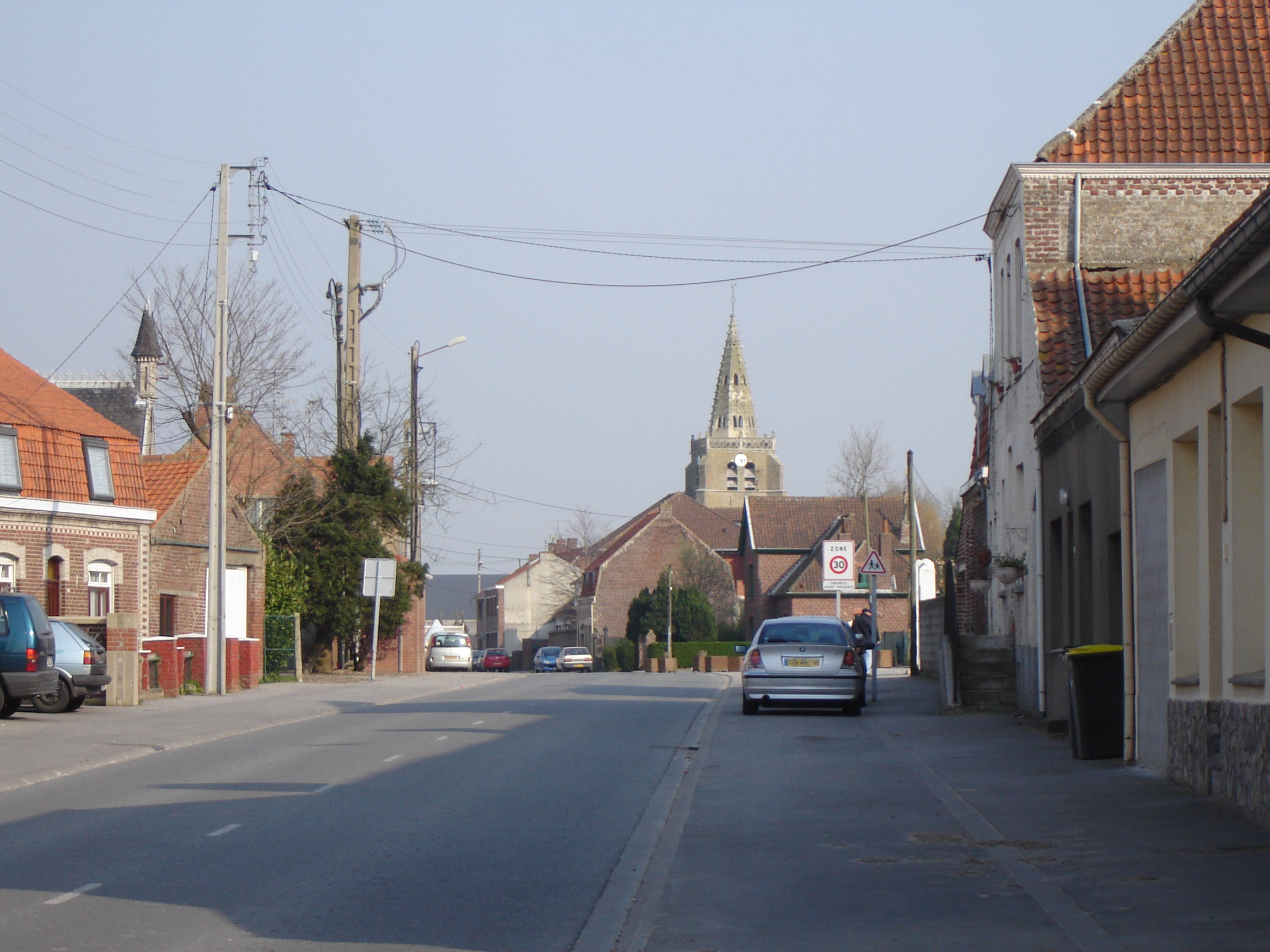
- Saint-Martin

- Coat of arms
- Location of Looberghe
- Location within France Location within Hauts-de-France
- Coordinates: 50°55′01″N 2°16′34″E
- Country: France
- Region: Hauts-de-France
- Department: Nord
- Arrondissement: Dunkirk
- Canton: Grande-Synthe
- Intercommunality: Hauts de Flandre

Government
  - Mayor (2020–2026): Arnaud Cooren
- Area^{1}: 19.55 km^{2} (7.55 sq mi)
- Elevation: 5 m (16 ft)
- Highest elevation: 11 m (36 ft)
- Lowest elevation: 0 m (0 ft)
- Population (2023): 1,228
  - Density: 62.81/km^{2} (162.7/sq mi)
- Demonym: Looberghois
- Time zone: UTC+01:00 (CET)
  - Summer (DST): UTC+02:00 (CEST)
- INSEE/Postal code: 59358 /59630
- ^{1} French Land Register data, which excludes lakes, ponds, glaciers > 1 km^{2} (0.386 sq mi or 247 acres) and river estuaries.

Looberghe (French pronunciation: [lɔbɛʁɡ]; from Flemish; Loberge in modern Dutch spelling) is a commune in the Nord department in northern France.

== Heraldry ==
Arms of Looberghe	The arms of Looberghe are blazoned : Argent, on a cross sable, 5 cinqfoils Or.

== See also ==
- Communes of the Nord department
