= Moulin de Vertain, Templeuve =

Windmill in France

Moulin de Vertain
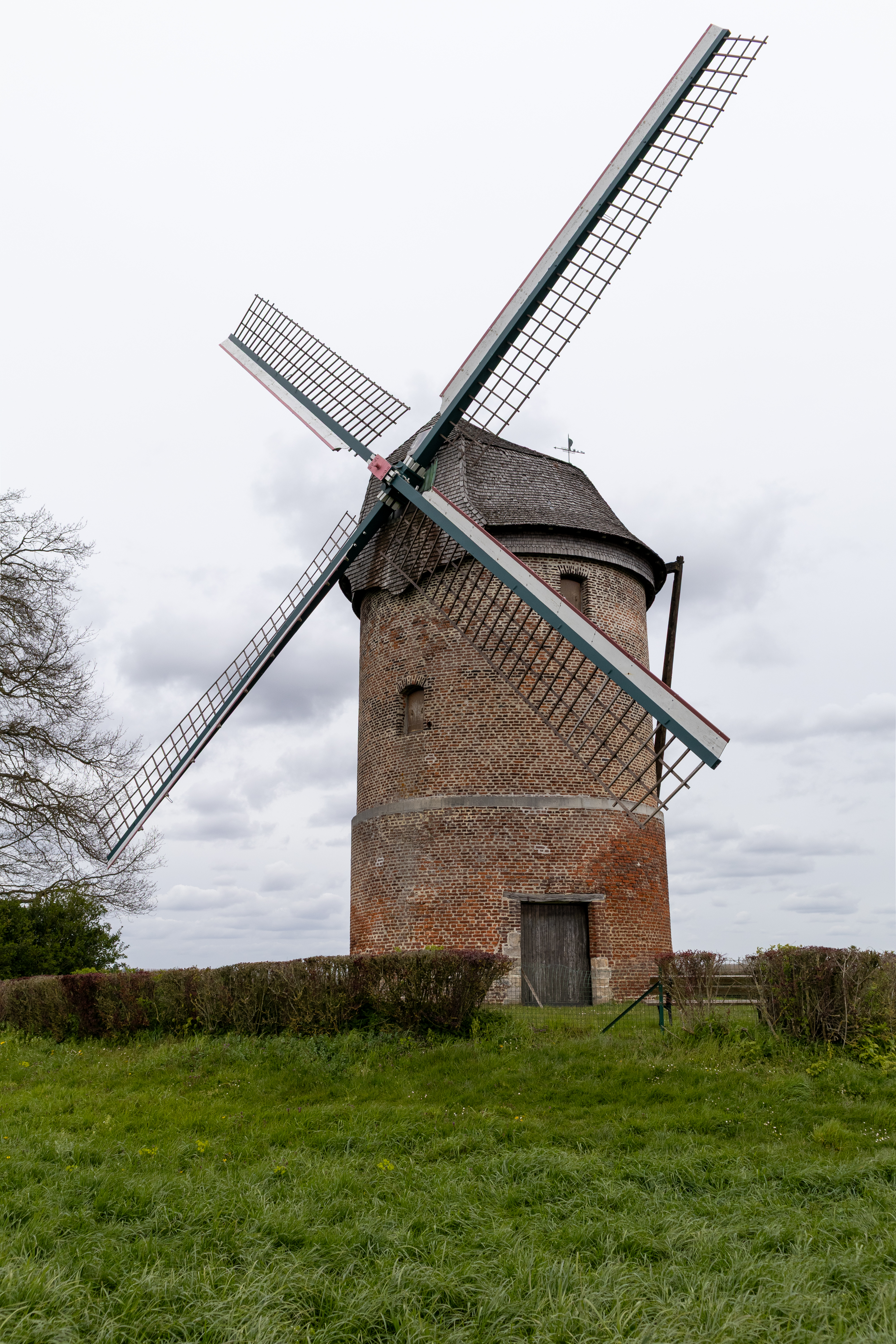
- The Moulin de Vertain in September 2011
- Interactive map of Moulin de Vertain

Origin
- Mill name: Moulin de Vertain; Moulin Blanc; Moulin de Briques
- Mill location: Rue Péronne, 59586 Templeuve-en-Pévèle
- Coordinates: 50°32′9.79″N 3°10′39.79″E
- Operator: Commune de Templeuve-en-Pévèle
- Year built: Late 15th century

Information
- Purpose: Corn mill
- Type: Tower mill in appearance, post mill in function
- Storeys: Three storeys
- No. of sails: Four sails
- Type of sails: Common sails
- Windshaft: Wood, cast iron poll end
- Winding: Tailpole and winch
- No. of pairs of millstones: Two pairs
- Size of millstones: One pair is 2.00 metres (6 ft 7 in) diameter
- Other information: Only mill of this construction remaining worldwide.

The Moulin de Vertain, also known as the Moulin Blanc (English: White Mill) and the Moulin de Briques (English: Mill of Bricks) is a unique windmill in Templeuve-en-Pévèle, Nord, France which was built in the late 15th century and has been restored to working order. Although it looks like a tower mill externally, it is technically akin to a post mill in internal construction and operation.

== History ==
A post mill stood on this site in 1328. It was owned by Anchin Abbey. A mill on this site was burnt in 1616 as an act of war. The current mill was built in the 15th century, It was standing by 1669, although at that time it only had one pair of 2.00 metres (6 ft 7 in) diameter millstones and was owned by Henin Robert, Lord of Vertain and Angremont. By 1771, the mill had two pairs of millstones. It was then owned by the Marquis of Aigremont until the time of the French Revolution. On 24 vendémiaire 6 (15 October 1798) the mill was sold to a person named Masse, its former owner the Marquis of Aigremont having fled France.

In 1824, the mill was owned by Jean Baptiste Castelain, miller. It was sold to M. Havez-Debuchy, a grain merchant of Templeuve, in 1836. By 1849, the mill was in the ownership of Louis Alexandre and Henri Havez of Wazemmes. It had passed to Jean Louis Havez, a butcher of Lille, by 1876. In 1887, the Moulin de Vertain was owned by the widow of Louis Havet-Vanhoverberghe. In 1908, the mill was in the ownership of Paul de Baratte, a notary in Paris. At this time it was painted white and known as the Moulin Blanc. It was also better known as the Moulin de Briques. It was in that year that its last miller, Jean-Baptiste Houze, died. His widow completed outstanding orders and then the mill ceased work to be eventually abandoned.

The mill was damaged by the Germans during World War I on numerous occasions. The mill's cap was restored in 1930. It was still in good condition post-World War II. By 1965, the mill was owned by Georges Delapalme-Baratte and Jeanne Cousin, née Baratte. In 1972, the mill was again derelict and the first steps were taken to save it. In 1973, The International Molinological Society held their third symposium at Arnhem, Gelderland, Netherlands. A motion was put before the members that the Moulin de Vertain should be saved, and all present signed it. Copies of the motion were passed to various national and local government agencies. On 23 July, the local commune decided to acquire the mill and the General Council of the Nord department accepted that the mill should be saved, and gave a grant to the local commune. The Ministry of Cultural Affairs took steps to list the mill, a process that took five years. In 1975, the Association Régionale des Amis des Moulins Nord-Pas-de-Calais (ARAM) had a tarpaulin placed over the mill and some of the machinery was removed for safe keeping. On 8 August 1978, the mill was listed. Its listing number is 98631. This freed up grant money for the restoration, which would take about 1,000,000 French francs to complete.

Restoration began in January 1980, with the tower being refurbished. The top 1 metre (3 ft 3 in) of the tower was removed and rebuilt, with bricks being replaced as necessary elsewhere. A new oak main post was cut at the Vrand sawmill in La Flamengrie (Avesnois). The tree had stood in the Forêt de Mormal. Another tree from that forest, which had been blown down in a storm, was cut at the Péter Sawmill, Lapugnoy, Pas-de-Calais and a sawmill at Felleries, Pas-de-Calais. A large iroko tree trunk, containing 15 cubic metres (530 cu ft) of timber was cut at a sawmill in Ghent, East Flanders, Belgium. The cap and floors were reconstructed at ARAMs base in Villeneuve-d'Ascq. The completed frame was transported to Templeuve on 7 June 1982 and it was craned into the mill on 22 June. The cap was then covered with chestnut shingles during July and August 1982. A new oak windshaft was made, and a new cast iron poll end affixed to it. The head and tail wheels were made in February and March 1983 and fitted to the windshaft. The whole assembly was then fitted to the mill on 26 May. Stone nuts were obtained second hand, one from a mill at Offekerque, Pas-de-Calais and the other from a mill at Cappels. The roof was then completed, along with the remainder of the internal work. The tailpole was also fitted, with some timber being new iroko and other timber coming from a pair of sails of a mill in Wormhout. Following a break during 1984, the restoration of the mill was completed in 1985 with the fitting of new sails, made by Peel Brothers, Gistel, West Flanders, Belgium. The restored mill was officially opened on 15 June 1985. The brick tower formerly had three iron hoops around it to reinforce the structure. These were removed when the mill was restored by ARAM. The Moulin de Vertain is listed as a site classé, No. IA59001425.

== Similar mills ==
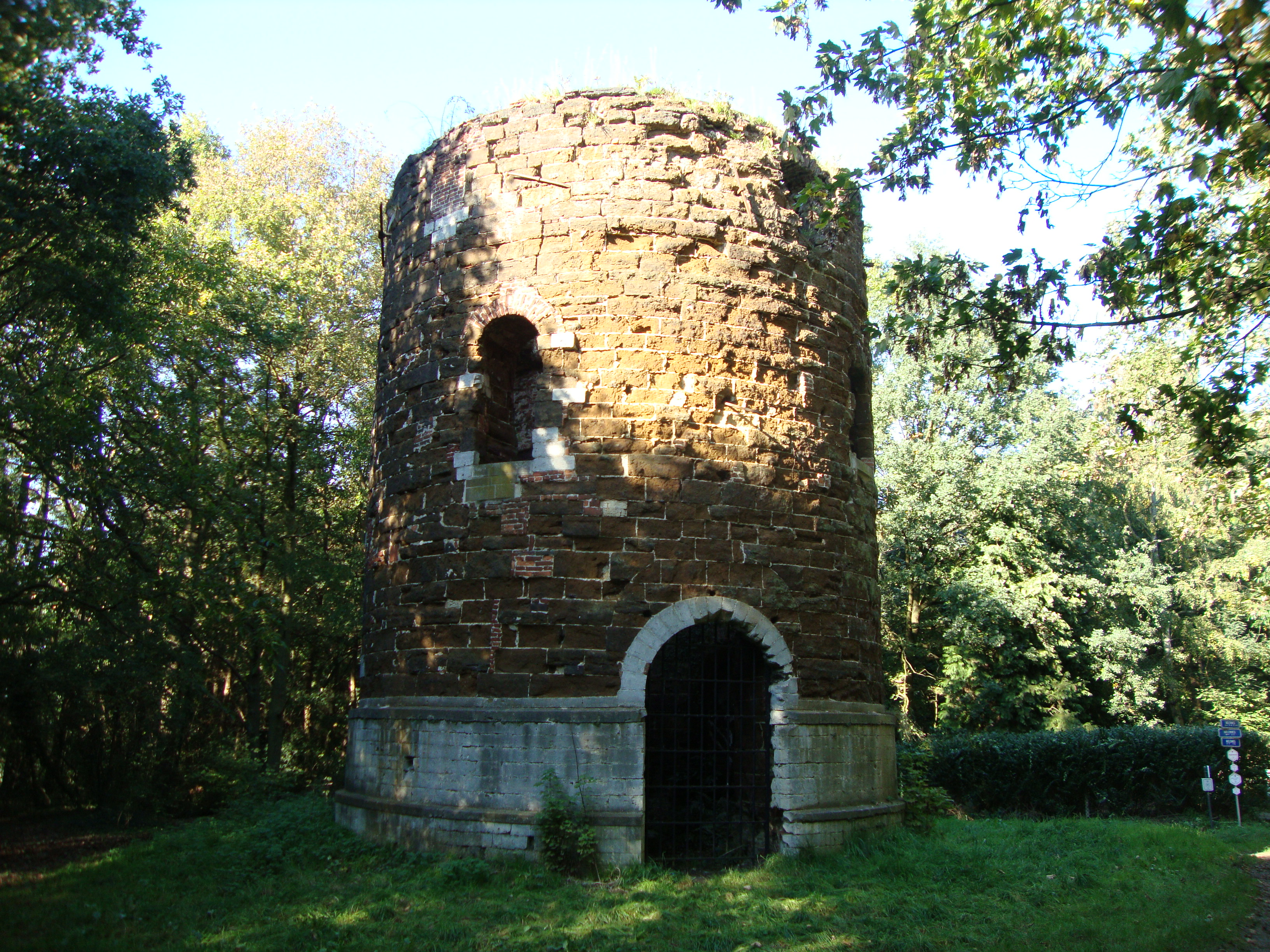
Oude Molen, Betekom was a similar mill to the Moulin de Vertain.

At least two other mills of this construction are known to have existed. One at Templemars, which was rebuilt from a conventional tower mill to this system in 1571. It had been demolished by the time of the French Revolution. The other was at Betekom, Flemish Brabant, Belgium, which was later converted to a conventional tower mill. The empty tower still stands.

== Description ==
Although resembling a tower mill externally, the mill is unique in its construction. A centre post, to which the floors are attached, runs through the mill. The cap and floors are fixed to this, and the whole rotates within the mill tower. Fifteen wooden rollers support the whole at the top of the tower, as a conventional curb would support the cap of a tower mill. The mill was constructed in this way to enable it to be worked by one man. It was said that a child of 15 or 16 could work such a mill. This system was probably invented by Gilles de Lannoy.

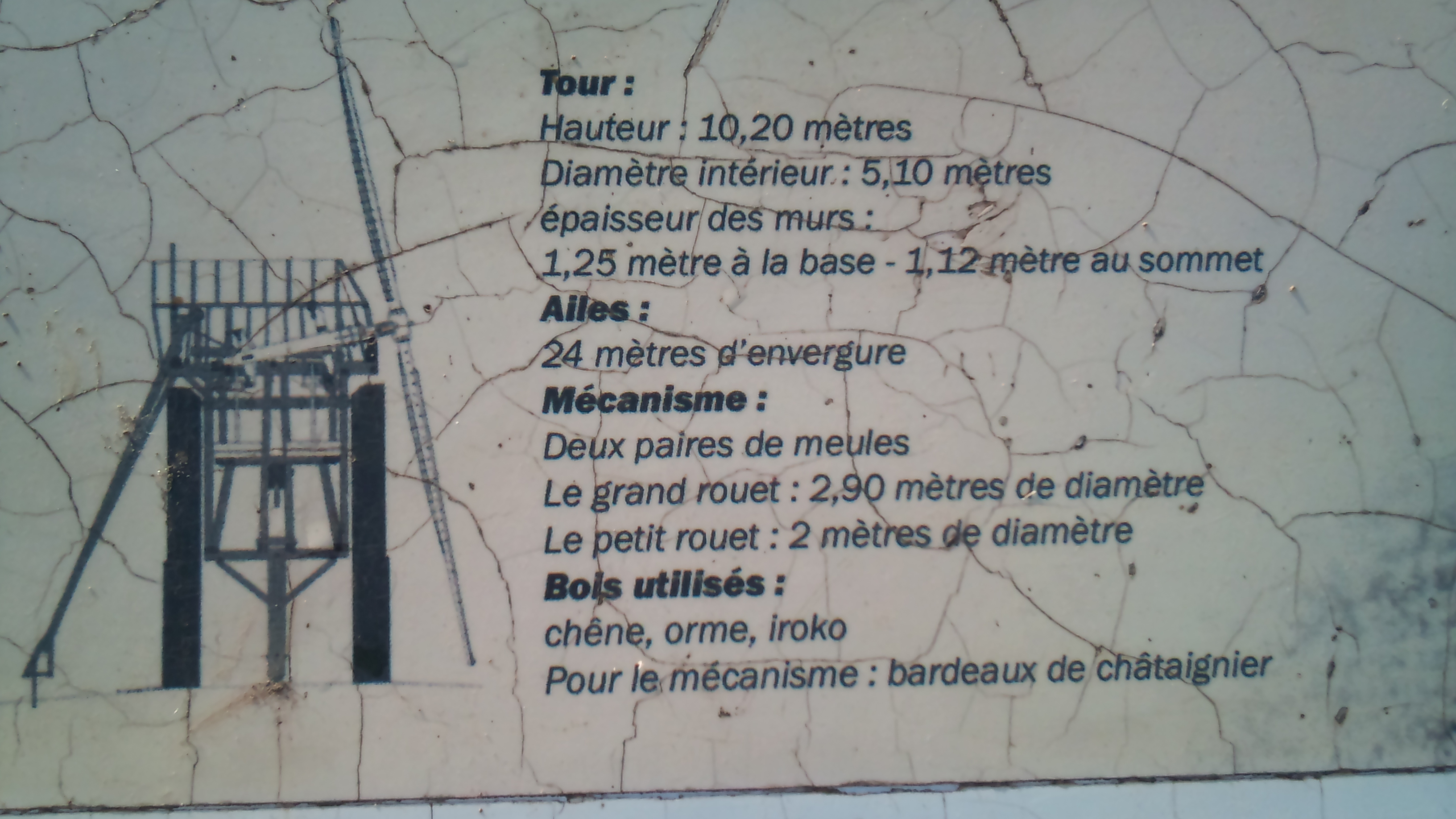
Cross-section of the mill

The tower is 1.25 metres (4 ft 1 in) thick at the base and 1.12 metres (3 ft 8 in) thick at the top. It is 10.20 metres (33 ft 6 in) tall and has an internal diameter of 5.10 metres (16 ft 9 in) The Common sails have a span of 24.00 metres (78 ft 9 in). They are carried on a wooden windshaft with a cast iron poll end. The windshaft carries a head wheel of 2.90 metres (9 ft 6 in) diameter and a tail wheel of 2.00 metres (6 ft 7 in) diameter. One of the two pairs of millstones is 2.00 metres (6 ft 7 in) diameter.

== Millers ==
- 1669 Jean de Lespaignol
- 1777 Jean Baptiste Wartelle
- 1824 Jean Baptiste Castelain
- 1888–1908 Jean-Baptiste Houze

References for above:
