= List of windmills in Flemish Brabant =

A list of windmills in the Belgian province of Flemish Brabant.

Location	Name of mill	Type	Built	Notes	Photograph
Aarschot	Witte Molen	Bergmolen	1920	Molenechos (in Dutch)	
Asse	Molen van Morette	Bergmolen	1831	Molenechos (in Dutch)	
Asse	Molen van Terheide	Bergmolen	1776	Molenechos (in Dutch)	
Asse	Molen van Zellik	Grondzeiler	1851	Molenechos; Onroeren Erfgoed both (in Dutch)	
Betekom	Nieuwe Molen	Bergmolen	1847	Molenechos (in Dutch)	
Betekom	Oude Molen	Grondzeiler	15th century	Molenechos (in Dutch)	
Bever	Molen van het Bos; Molen van Denutte	Grondzeiler	1828	Molenechos (in Dutch)	
Bever	Molen Rigaux; Molen van de Plaats	Stellingmolen	1780	Molenechos (in Dutch)	
Blanden	Ekstermolen; Molen van Blanden	Bergmolen	1847	Molenechos (in Dutch)	
Borchtlombeek	Eikautermolen	Staakmolen	1635	Burnt down 1926. Ontdekpajotzenne (in Dutch)	
Diest	Lindenmolen	Staakmolen	1887	Molenechos (in Dutch)	
Elingen	Zwarte Molen	Bergmolen	1779	Molenechos (in Dutch)	
Everberg	Molen Lambrechts	Stellingmolen	1894	Molenechos (in Dutch)	
Gelrode	Moedermeule	Staakmolen	1833	Originally built at Mechelen in 1667. Moved to Gelrode in 1833. Molenechos (in Dutch)	
Heikruis	Kamsmolen	Bergmolen	1786	Molenechos (in Dutch)	
Hekelgem	Oude Molen	Grondzeiler	1785	Molenechos (in Dutch)	
Hekelgem	Nieuwe Molen; Molen de Vis	Bergmolen	1827	Molenechos (in Dutch)	
Kattem	Kattemmolen	Staakmolen		Onroerend Erfgoed (in Dutch)	
Keerbergen	Heimolen; Oude Molen	Staakmolen	1706	Molenechos (in Dutch)	
Kessel-Lo	Pinxterenmolen	Bergmolen	1882	Molenechos (in Dutch)	
Langdorp	Heimolen	Staakmolen	1662	Molenechos (in Dutch)	
Londerzeel	Het Merelaantje	Staakmolen	1973	Originally built at Gistel in 1938, moved to Londerzeel in 1973; Molenechos (in Dutch)	
Lubbeek	Sint-Bernardusmolen	Bergmolen	1870	Molenechos (in Dutch)	
Lubbeek	Sint-Martensmolen; Molen Moiné	Bergmolen	1864	Molenechos (in Dutch)	
Lubbeek	Gasthuismolen	Achtkantemolen	c. 1755	Engine driven mill (pictured) built in 1898. Smock demolished post-1915. Onroerend Erfgoed (in Dutch)	
Malderen	Heidemolen	Staakmolen	1719	Molenechos (in Dutch)	
Mazenzele	Molen Van der Straeten	Grondzeiler	1848	Molenechos (in Dutch)	
Merchtem	Koutermolen	Bergmolen	1872	Molenechos (in Dutch)	
Neervelp	Molen Wits	Grondzeiler	1894	Molenechos (in Dutch)	
Onze-Lieve-Vrouw-Lombeek	Hertboommolen; Tragische Molen; Zepposmolen	Staakmolen	1727	Molenechos (in Dutch)	
Oud-Heverlee			1667		
Overpelt	Leyssens Molen	Grondzeiler			
Pamel			C.14th	Onroerend Erfgoed (in Dutch)	
Pamel	De Pauselijke Zoeaaf	Staakmolen	1789	Onroerend Erfgoed (in Dutch)	
Pamel	Kierekensmolen	Staakmolen	1773	Moved from Papignies, Hainaut. Hubert de Bolle (in Dutch)	
Pamel	Kierekensmolen	Staakmolen	1941	Moved within Pamel. Blown down 30 January 1970. Hubert de Bolle (in Dutch)	
Rummen	Molen van Rummen	Grondzeiler	1878	Molenechos (in Dutch)	
Schaffen	Verloren Kostmolen; Molen van Schaffen; De Windmolen; Molen van 't Dorp	Staakmolen	1904	Originally built in Beverlo, Limburg in 1826, moved to Schaffen in 1904; Molenechos (in Dutch)	
Strijtem	Molen van Strijtem	Staakmolen			
Tervuren		Bergmolen			
Tollembeek	Flietermolen	Bergmolen	1786	Molenechos (in Dutch)	
Veltem-Beisem	Molen van Veltem	Grondzeiler	1866	Molenechos (in Dutch)	
Willebringen	Molen van Willebringen	Grondzeiler	1882	Molenechos (in Dutch)	

== Notes ==
Bold indicates a mill that is still standing. Italics indicates a mill with some remains surviving.
