= Rolle bolle =

Target sport

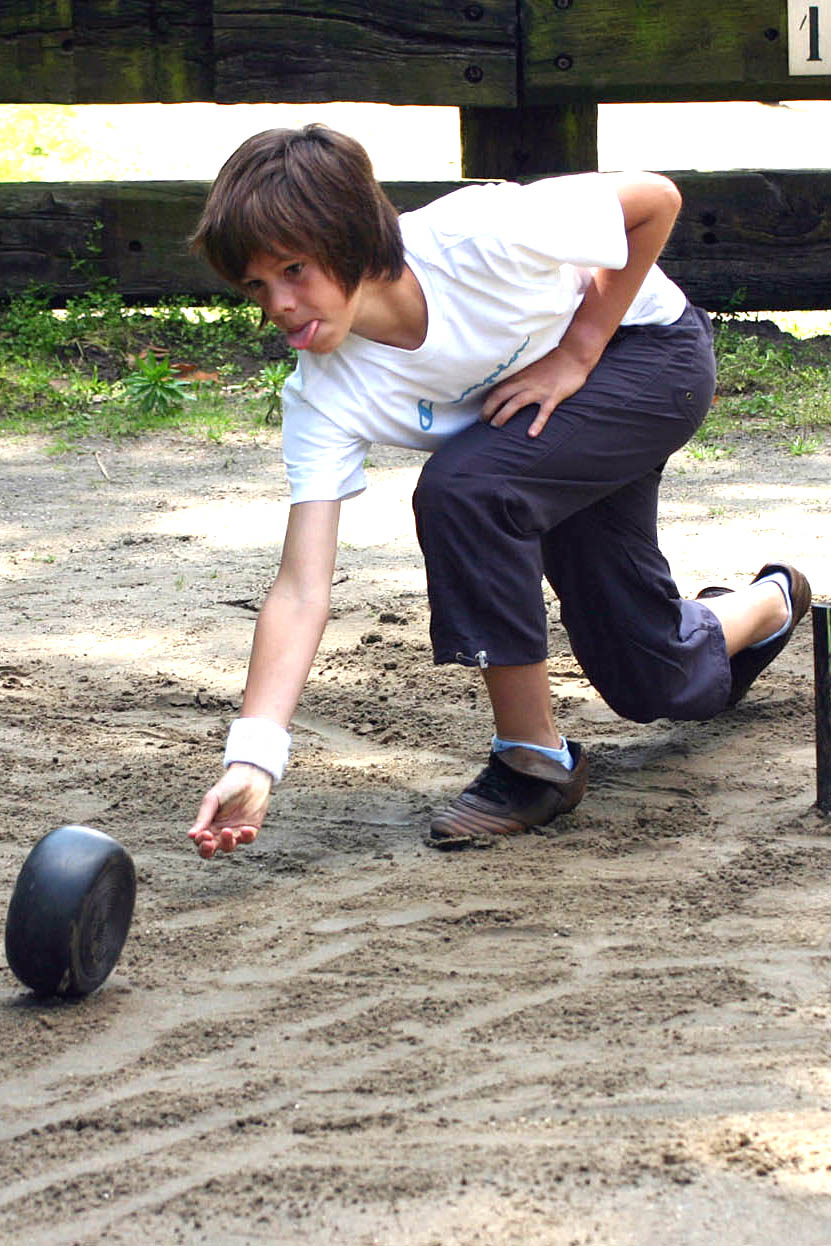
- A rolle bolle player bowls the bolle towards the stake at the other end of the court

Characteristics
- Contact: Non-contact
- Team members: 3-4 players
- Type: Bowling, boules
- Equipment: Bolles (balls) and stakes

Presence
- Olympic: No

Rolle bolle (/ˈroʊliˈboʊli/ ROH-lee-BOH-lee), also known as Belgian bowling or krulbollen, is a bowling sport related to boules, and originates in the Flanders region of Belgium. The sport was introduced to North America in the late 19th and early 20th centuries and is played in some rural areas of the Midwest and Prairie regions of the United States and Canada.

One of the defining characteristics of rolle bolle is the wheel-like shape of the ball, or bolle. Bolles are manufactured in a way so that they do not roll straight but in a curved, elliptical path.

== History ==
The exact origins of rolle bolle are unknown, but it is known that it was developed in Flanders, a Dutch-speaking region of Belgium, before the 20th century.

The Dutch name for rolle bolle, krulbollen, literally translates to "curve ball" due to the elliptical path taken by the bolle.

In the late 19th and early 20th centuries, Belgian and Dutch immigrants to the United States and Canada introduced rolle bolle (krulbollen) and other similar Belgian sports such as feather bowling (trabollen).

== Rules and play ==
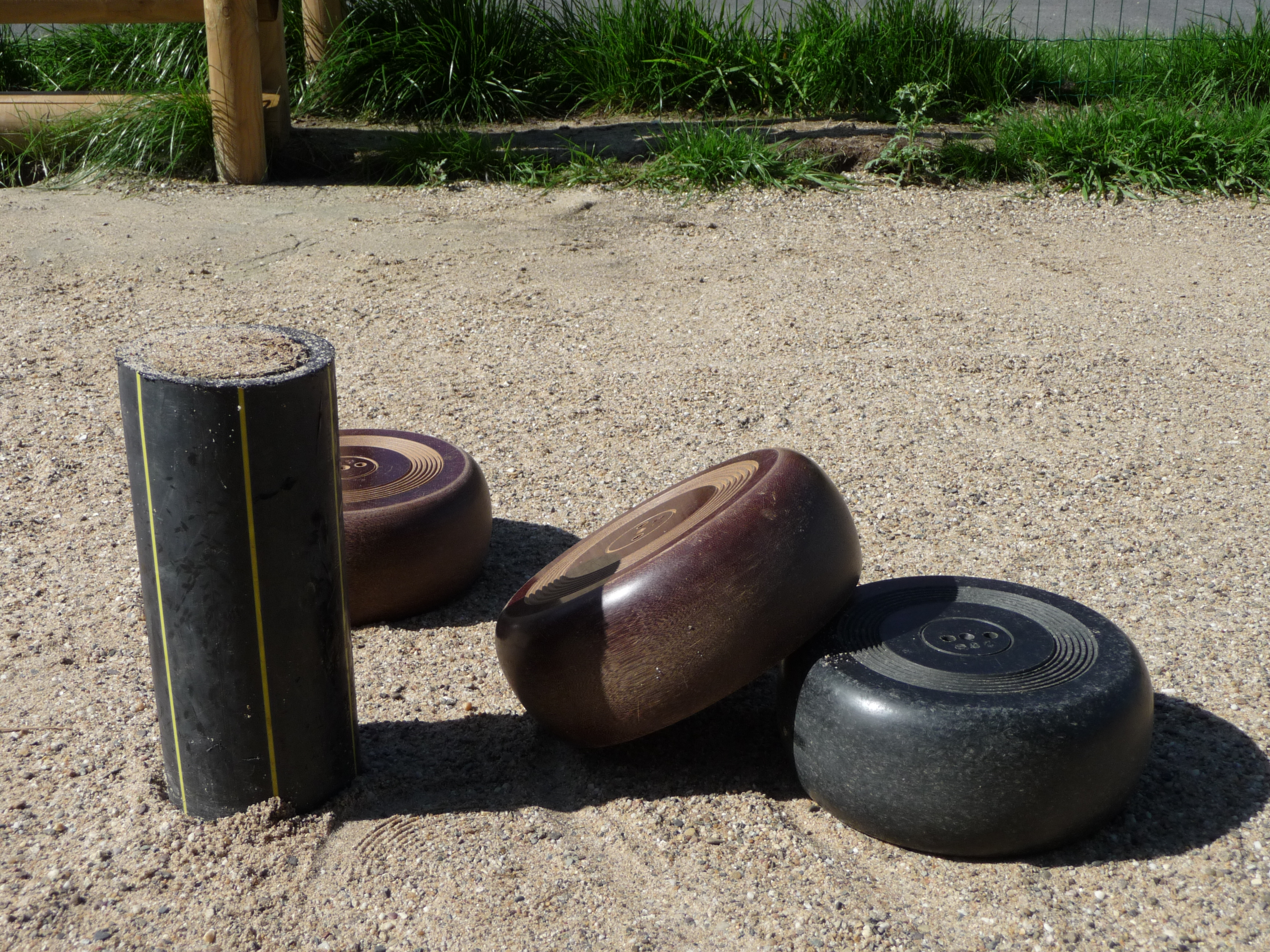
A stake and three bolles (two red, one black)

Rolle bolle is played on a flat court typically made of natural soil, crushed limestone, or pavement. Two stakes (or "pegs") are placed a distance apart on either ends of the court, typically 30 feet (9.1 m). Courts are typically 12 feet (3.7 m) wide. Stakes can be between 1 and 3 inches (2.5 and 7.6 cm) in diameter and are made of wood (such as a baseball bat pounded into the ground), but other materials are also used.

The balls, or bolles, are typically 6 to 8 inches (15 to 20 cm) in diameter and 4 inches (10 cm) thick. Traditional bolles are made of wood, however other materials can be used such as hardened rubber or molded plastic. Bolles are machined with a taper, which causes them to roll in an elliptical fashion.

Rolle bolle is played by two teams of 3–4 players each. Games are broken up by rounds; each round is an opportunity for a single team to score points. In a round, players from opposing teams take turns rolling their bolles towards the stake at the far end of the court. At the end of each round, when all players have rolled their bolles, points are awarded to the team with the closest bolle(s) to the stake. The next round then begins in the same manner, aiming for the other stake. The first team to score a set number of points (typically 8) is the winner.

=== Scoring ===
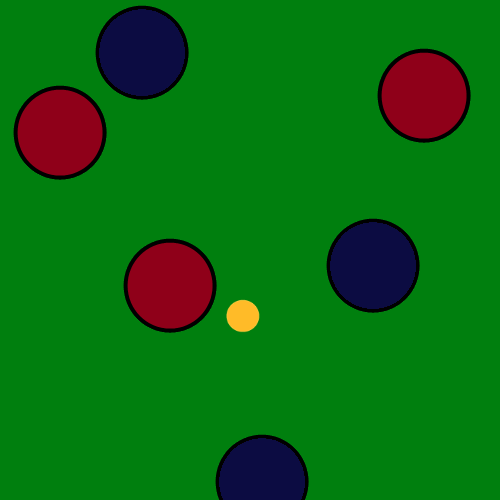
The red team has the bolle closest to the stake, but the second-closest bolle belongs to the blue team. Red scores one point. Blue scores nothing.

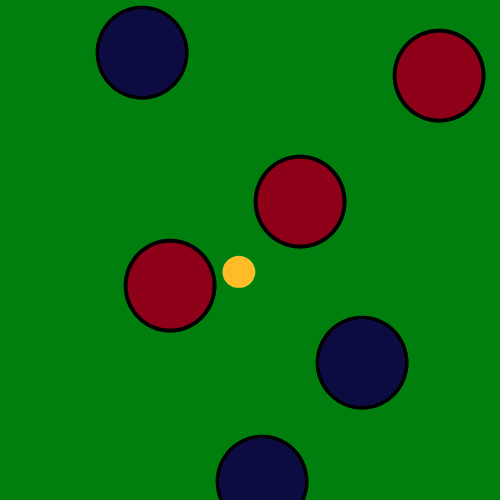
The red team has two bolles closer to the stake than the blue team's closest bolle. Red scores two points. Blue scores nothing.

A round is complete when both teams have played all of their bolles. If the round finishes then the team with the closest bolle wins the round and scores one point for each of its bolles that is closer to the jack than other team's closest bolle. The first team to a predetermined number of points is the winner of the game.

=== Strategy ===
When rolling a bolle, there are two main strategies a player can choose between: bowling, and shooting. When bowling, the player (bowler) aims the bolle along an elliptical course to get as close to the stake as possible. The bowler releases the bolle underhand, with not much speed. This strategy is used for good placement for scoring. The alternative option is to shoot. When shooting, the player (shooter) aims the bolle in a straight line, directly at an opponent's bolle nearby the stake. The bolle is released underhand, but with great speed. The goal is to knock the opponents' bolle(s) away from the stake.

== Geographical distribution ==
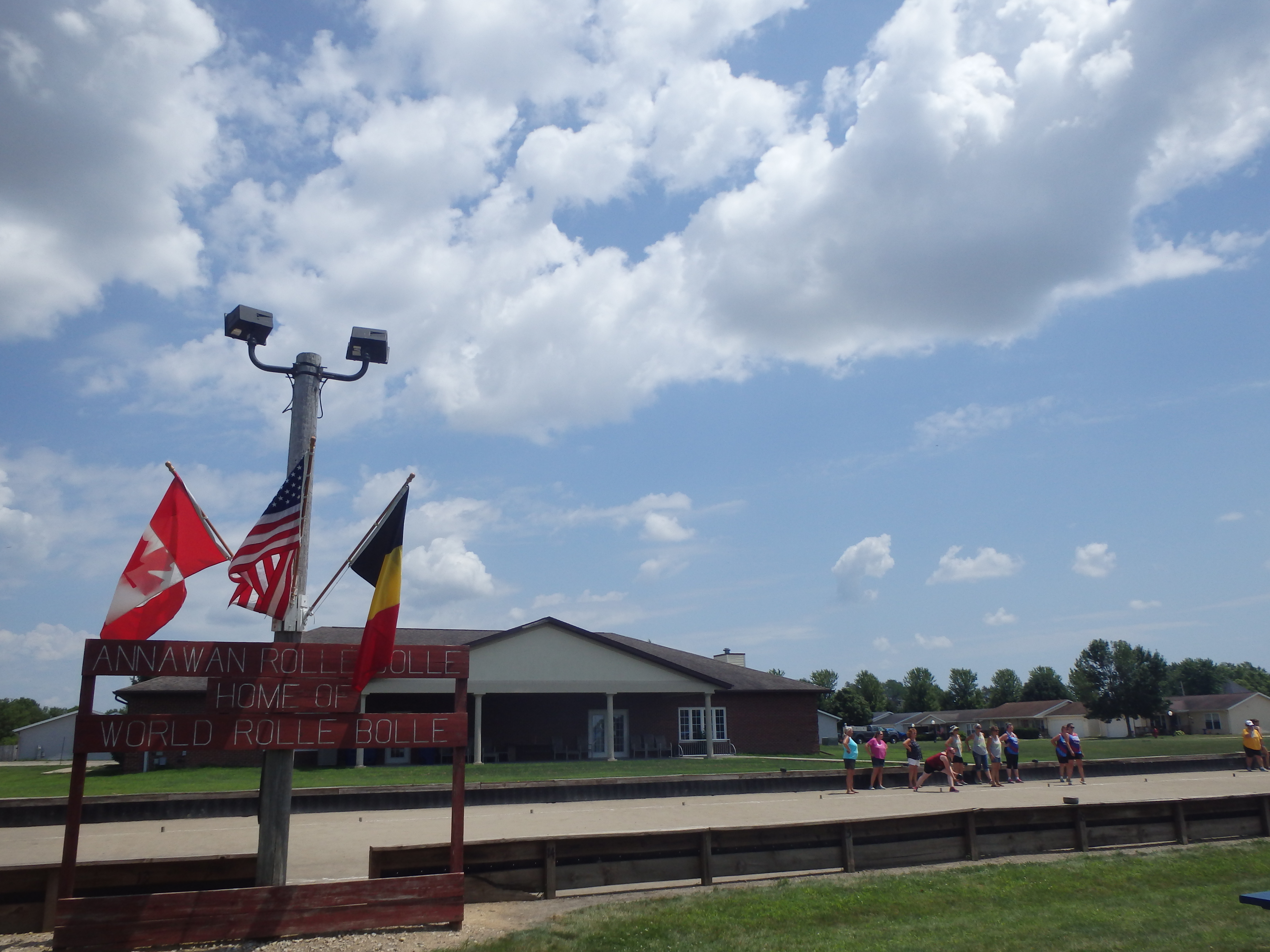
Rolle bolle courts in Annawan, Illinois, with sign declaring the Rolle Bolle World Tournament

In Europe, rolle bolle is played in the Flanders regions of the Netherlands and Belgium, where it originated. It is more common in rural areas, especially near Ghent, in the Meetjesland region and the region from Knesselare to Bruges.

In North America, rolle bolle is played in rural areas ranging from Iowa to Winnipeg, in towns settled by Belgian emigrants. States and provinces where rolle bolle is played include: Illinois, Iowa, Manitoba, Minnesota, Indiana, and Wisconsin.

== See also ==
- Feather bowling, which uses a similar bolle but the court is a trough
