= List of windmills in West Flanders =

A list of windmills in the Belgian province of West Flanders.

Location	Name of mill	Type	Built	Notes	Photograph
Aalbeke	Hoogmolen	Staakmolen	1717	Molenechos (in Dutch)	
Aarsele	Delmerensmolen	Bergmolen	1857	Molenechos (in Dutch)	
Aartrijke	Oliemolen Termote	Stellingmolen	1837	Molenechos (in Dutch)	
Adinkerke		Staakmolen			
Anzegem	Landergemmolen	Staakmolen	1781	Molenechos (in Dutch)	
Ardooie	Platsemolen	Bergmolen		Onroerend Erfgoed (in Dutch)	
Ardooie	Rysselendenmolen	Bergmolen	1855	Molenechos, Onroerend Erfgoed both (in Dutch)	
Assebroek		Bergmolen			
Avekapelle	Oude Zeedijkmolen	Staakmolen	1745	Molenechos (in Dutch)	
Beernem		Staakmolen			1703, blown down 1869; Onroerend Erfgoed (in Dutch)
Beernem	Zeldonkmolen	Bergmolen	1872	Onroerend Erfgoed (in Dutch)	
Bellegem	Kattebergmolen; Lonckes Molen	Staakmolen	Early 19th century	Molenechos (in Dutch)	
Beveren-aan-de-IJzer	Brouckmolen	Grondzeiler	1862	Molenechos (in Dutch)	
Bikschote	Beeuwsaertmolen; Blauwe Molen; Bikschotemolen	Staakmolen	1830	Molenechos (in Dutch)	
Bredene	Molen Vyvey	Staakmolen	1908	Molenechos (in Dutch)	
Bredene	Molen Hollevoey	Staakmolen			
Bredene	Molen Theofiel Hubert	Staakmolen			
Bruges	De Nieuwe Pappegai	Staakmolen	1970	Molenechos (in Dutch)	
Bruges	Bonne Chiere	Staakmolen	1911	Molenechos (in Dutch)	
Bruges	Sint-Janhuismolen	Staakmolen	1770	Molenechos (in Dutch)	
Bruges	Koeleweimolen; De Coelewey	Staakmolen	1765	Molenechos (in Dutch)	
Damme	Schellemolen	Bergmolen	1867	Molenechos (in Dutch)	
Damme	Dorpsmolen	Staakmolen	1806	Demolished 1820; Onroerend Erfgoed (in Dutch)	
Damme	Dorpsmolen	Bergmolen	1820	Onroerend Erfgoed (in Dutch)	
Deerlijk	Molen Ter Geest en Ter Zande	Stellingmolen	1888	Molenechos (in Dutch)	
De Haan	Molen Maelfyt	Staakmolen			
De Haan		Staakmolen			
De Moeren	Sint-Karelsmolen	Grondzeiler	c. 1800	Molenechos (in Dutch)	
De Moeren	Sint-Gustaafsmolen	Bergmolen	c.1850	Onroerend Erfgoed (in Dutch)	
Dentergem	D'Hondt-Goethals	Stellingmolen	c. 1830	Onroerend Erfgoed (in Dutch)	
Eernegem	Bogaertsmolen; Dorpsmolen	Stellingmolen	1857	Molenechos (in Dutch)	
Eggewartskapelle	Molentje Decroos	Staakmolen	1905	Molenechos (in Dutch)	
Elverdinge	Vermeulens Molen	Stellingmolen	1843	Molenechos (in Dutch)	
Geluveld	Geluveldmolen	Staakmolen	17th century	Molenechos (in Dutch)	
Gistel	Oostmolen; Kleine Molen	Staakmolen	1841	Molenechos (in Dutch)	
Gistel	De Meerlaan; Meerlaanmolen	Staakmolen built on top of a Stellingmolen	1926	Molenechos (in Dutch)	
Gits	Grijspeerdmolen	Staakmolen	1982	Molenechos (in Dutch)	
Gullegem	Pompmolentje	Staakmolen	c. 1960	Molenechos (in Dutch)	
Handzame	Braem's Molen	Stellingmolen			
Harelbeke	Koutermolen	Staakmolen	18th century	Molenechos (in Dutch)	
Harelbeke	Molen Allegaert	Bergmolen			
Herentals		Staakmolen			
Heule	Preetjesmolen	Staakmolen	1865	Molenechos (in Dutch)	
Hoeke	Hoekemolen; Molen van Hoeke	Grondzeiler	1840	Molenechos (in Dutch)	
Houtem	Seinemolen; De Seine	Achtkante Molen	1789	Molenechos (in Dutch)	
Hulste	Muizelmolen	Stellingmolen	1840	Molenechos (in Dutch)	
Ichtegem	Engelmolen	Staakmolen			
Ichtegem	Molen Rommel	Staakmolen			
Ichtegem	Reigermolen	Staakmolen			
Ieper	Molentje van Delboo	Staakmolen	1960	3/8 scale model Molenechos (in Dutch)	
Ingelmunster	Doornmolen	Stellingmolen	1856	Molenechos (in Dutch)	
Ingelmunster	Zandbergmolen	Stellinggmolen	1839	Molenechos (in Dutch)	
Ingooigem	Stenen Molen	Bergmolen	1848	Molenechos (in Dutch)	
Izegem	Molen van Ave Maria	Achtkante Molen	1861	Molenechos (in Dutch)	
Jabbeke	Molen van Kerrebroeck	Stellingmolen	1911	Molenechos (in Dutch)	
Kanegem	Mevrouwmolen; Vrouwenmolen	Stellingmolen	1844	Molenechos (in Dutch)	
Kaster	Stampkotmolen	Staakmolen	1874	Molenechos (in Dutch)	
Klemskerke	Geersensmolen; Dorpsmolen; Levensmolen; Zuidmolen	Staakmolen	1697	Molenechos (in Dutch)	
Klerken	Vredesmolen; Molen Vancoillie	Stellingmolen	1879	Molenechos (in Dutch)	
Knokke	Molen van Siska	Grondzeiler	1902	Molenechos (in Dutch)	
Knokke	Kalfmolen	Staakmolen	Late 17th century	Molenechos (in Dutch)	
Knokke	Bosmolen; Oude Molen	Staakmolen	1858	Molenechos (in Dutch)	
Knokke	Molen Dewulf	Grondzeiler			
Knokke	Molen Thiel	Staakmolen			
Koekelare	Hovaeremolen	Bergmolen	Early 18th century	Molenechos (in Dutch)	
Koekelare	Plaatsmolen; Molen van Ghillewe; Molen Depreitere	Bergmolen	1837	Molenechos (in Dutch)	
Koksijde	Zuid-Abdijmolen	Staakmolen	1773	Molenechos (in Dutch)	
Koksijde	Hooge Blekker	Stellingmolen			
Koksijde-Bad		Staakmolen			
Koolkerke	Ter Pannemolen; Gailliaertmolen	Bergmolen	1890	Molenechos (in Dutch)	
Kortemark	Koutermolen	Staakmolen		Molenechos (in Dutch)	
Kortrijk		Staakmolen			
Kuurne	Stokerijmolen	Staakmolen	1796	Molenechos (in Dutch)	
Langemark	Hagebosmolen	Staakmolen	1991	Molenechos (in Dutch)	
Langemark	Steenakkermolen	Staakmolen	1790	Molenechos (in Dutch)	
Langemark		Grondzeiler			
Leffinge	Groenhagenmolen; Molen Rommel	Grondzeiler	1871	Molenechos (in Dutch)	
Leisele	Stalijsermolen	Staakmolen	1804	Molenechos (in Dutch)	
Leke	Kruiskalsijdemolen; Molen Vandenberghe	Stellingmolen	1871	Molenechos (in Dutch)	
Lo		Staakmolen			
Marke	Rodenburgmolen; Vannestes Molen; Molen Glorieux	Stellinggmolen	1840	Molenechos (in Dutch)	
Meetkerke	Grote Molen	Bergmolen	1811	Onroerend Erfgoed (in Dutch)	
Menen	De Goede Hoop	Stellingmolen	1798	Molenechos (in Dutch)	
Menen	Oude Molen	Staakmolen			
Merkem	Beukelaremolen	Staakmolen	1923	Molenechos (in Dutch)	
Meulebeke	Herentmolen	Staakmolen	Late 16th century	Molenechos (in Dutch)	
Meulebeke	Kleine Herentmolen	Staakmolen	1983	Molenechos (in Dutch)	
Middelkerke	Dorpsmolen	Staakmolen			
Middelkerke	Ketelers Molen	Staakmolen			
Middelkerke	Molen Hallevoet	Staakmolen			
Moorsele	De Grote Macht; Witte Molen	Stellingmolen	1817	Molenechos (in Dutch)	
Nieuwpoort	Mommerency's Molen	Staakmolen	1985	Molenechos (in Dutch)	
Oedelem	Plaatsmolen	Bergmolen	1868	Molenechos (in Dutch)	
Oedelem	Hoogstraatmolen	Bergmolen	1876	Molenechos (in Dutch)	
Oostduinkerke		Staakmolen			
Oostduinkerke	Le Petit Molen	Achtkante molen			
Oostkamp	Braetsmolen; Oostmolen; De Wieke	Stellinggmolen	1840	Molenechos (in Dutch)	
Oostkamp	Zephyrusmolen	Stellingmolen	1990	Onroerend Erfgoed (in Dutch)	
Oostkamp	Molen De Kessel	Grondzeiler			
Oostkamp	Termote Molen	Bergmolen			
Oostkerke	Oude Molen	Grondzeiler	1854	Molenechos (in Dutch)	
Oostkerke	Dorpsmolen; Molen van Thooft	Grondzeiler	1875	Molenechos (in Dutch)	
Oostvleteren	De Meesters Molen	Staakmolen	c. 1760	Molenechos (in Dutch)	
Oostvleteren	De Lelie	Staakmolen	1983	Molenechos (in Dutch)	
Oudenburg	Molen Acke	Stellingmolen	1858	Molenechos (in Dutch)	
Oudenburg	Waere Molen	Bergmolen	1835	Onroerend Erfgoed (in Dutch)	
Outrijve	Tombeelmolen	Bergmolen	18th century	Molenechos (in Dutch)	
Pittem	Plaatsmolen	Stellingmolen	1909	Molenechos (in Dutch)	
Pollinkhove	Markeymolen	Staakmolen	1797	Molenechos (in Dutch)	
Pollinkhove	Machuutmolen	Grondzeiler	1870	Molenechos (in Dutch)	
Ramskapelle	Callantmolen; De Kruier	Grondzeiler	1897	Molenechos (in Dutch)	
Rekkem	Stenen Molen; Castertmolen	Stellingmolen	1825	Molenechos (in Dutch)	
Roeselare	Vossemolen	Staakmolen			
Roeselare	Kazandmolen	Bergmolen	1813	Onroerend Erfgoed (in Dutch)	
Roksem	Witte Molen	Bergmolen	1843	Molenechos (in Dutch)	
Ruddervoorde	Molenhoekmolen	Staakmolen	1986	Molenechos (in Dutch)	
Ruddervoorde	Zephyrusmolen	Stellingmolen	1975	Molenechos (in Dutch)	
Ruiselede	Hostensmolen	Stellingmolen	1865	Molenechos (in Dutch)	
Ruiselede	Knokmolen	Stellingmolen	1840	Molenechos (in Dutch)	
Ruiselede	Vlaagtemolen	Grondzeiler	1868	Molenechos (in Dutch)	
Ruiselede	Poekemolen; Molen Van Poucke	Staakmolen	1960	1/3 scale model Molenechos (in Dutch)	
Rumbeke	Kazandmolen	Stellingmolen	1813	Molenechos (in Dutch)	
Schuiferskapelle	Balsmolen	Grondzeiler	1850	Molenechos (in Dutch)	
Sijsele	Dorpsmolen; Lievensmolen	Bergmolen	1820	Molenechos (in Dutch)	
Sijsele	Alkerkemolen; Roelsmolen; Oudeakkermolen	Bergmolen	1873	Molenechos (in Dutch)	
Sint-Denijs	Molen ter Claere	Grondzeiler	1848	Molenechos (in Dutch)	
Sint-Eloois-Winkel	Lindemolen	Staakmolen	1920	Molenechos (in Dutch)	
Sint-Joris, Beernem	Zeldonkmolen; Molen Braet	Bergmolen	1871	Molenechos (in Dutch)	
Sint-Pieters	Zandwegemolen	Stellingmolen	1860	Molenechos (in Dutch)	
Snellegem	Boerenmolen	Stellingmolen	1858	Molenechos (in Dutch)	
Staden	Heksenmolen	Staakmolen	1997	Molenechos (in Dutch)	
Stalhille	Grote Molen; Molen Verburgh	Grondzeiler	Early 19th century	Molenechos (in Dutch)	
Stene	Molen van Stene	Bergmolen	1853	Molenechos (in Dutch)	
Tiegem	Bergmolen; Stampersmolen	Grondzeiler	1880	Molenechos (in Dutch)	
Tiegem		Staakmolen			
Tielt	Poelbergmolen	Staakmolen	18th century	Molenechos (in Dutch)	
Tielt	Lonckes Molen; Molen Warnez	Stellingmolen	1848	Molenechos (in Dutch)	
Torhout	Nieuwhovemolen	Staakmolen	2002	Molenechos (in Dutch)	
Veurne	Duiveltje der Nachten	Staakmolen	1979	Molenechos (in Dutch)	
Wakken	Goethalsmolen	Stellingmolen	c. 1830	Molenechos (in Dutch)	
Waregem	Molentje Casier	Staakmolen	c. 1880	Molenechos (in Dutch)	
Waregem	Molen Bossuyt	Staakmolen			
Waregem	Molen Vandenbroucke	Staakmolen			
Wenduine	Hubertmolen	Staakmolen	1880	Molenechos (in Dutch)	
Werken	Kruisstraatmolen; Berghes Molen	Staakmolen	1773	Molenechos (in Dutch)	
Wervik	Briekenmolen; Witte Molen	Stellingmolen	c. 1805	Molenechos (in Dutch)	
Wervik	Kruiskemolen	Staakmolen	1922	Molenechos (in Dutch)	
Wervik	Leeskensmolen; Quartiersmolentje	Stellingmolen	1978	Molenechos (in Dutch)	
Westkerke	Molen van Damme	Bergmolen	1835	Molenechos (in Dutch)	
Westouter	Lijstermolen; Hazemolen	Staakmolen	1805	Molenechos (in Dutch)	
Wevelgem	Vanbutselesmolen	Stellingmolen	c. 1851	Molenechos (in Dutch)	
Wevelgem	Molen Denys	Stellingmolen	1834	Molenechos (in Dutch)	
Wielsbeke	Molen Moreau; Molen Goemare	Staakmolen	Late 18th or early 19th century	Molenechos (in Dutch)	
Zarren	Wullepitmolen; Lindemolen	Staakmolen	1623	Molenechos (in Dutch)	
Zarren	Couchezmolen	Stellingmolen	1870	Molenechos (in Dutch)	
Zedelgem	Lievensmolen; Platsemolen; Dorpsmolen	Bergmolen	1866	Molenechos (in Dutch)	
Zwevegem	Stenen Molen; Klockemolen	Stellingmolen	1798	Molenechos (in Dutch)	
Zwevegem	Mortiersmolen	Staakmolen	c. 1794	Molenechos (in Dutch)	
Zwevegem	Molen Vervaeke	Staakmolen			

== Notes ==
Bold indicates a mill that is still standing. Italics indicates a mill with some remains surviving.
