= Veurne =

Municipality in Flemish Community, Belgium

Veurne: Veurn
- City and municipality
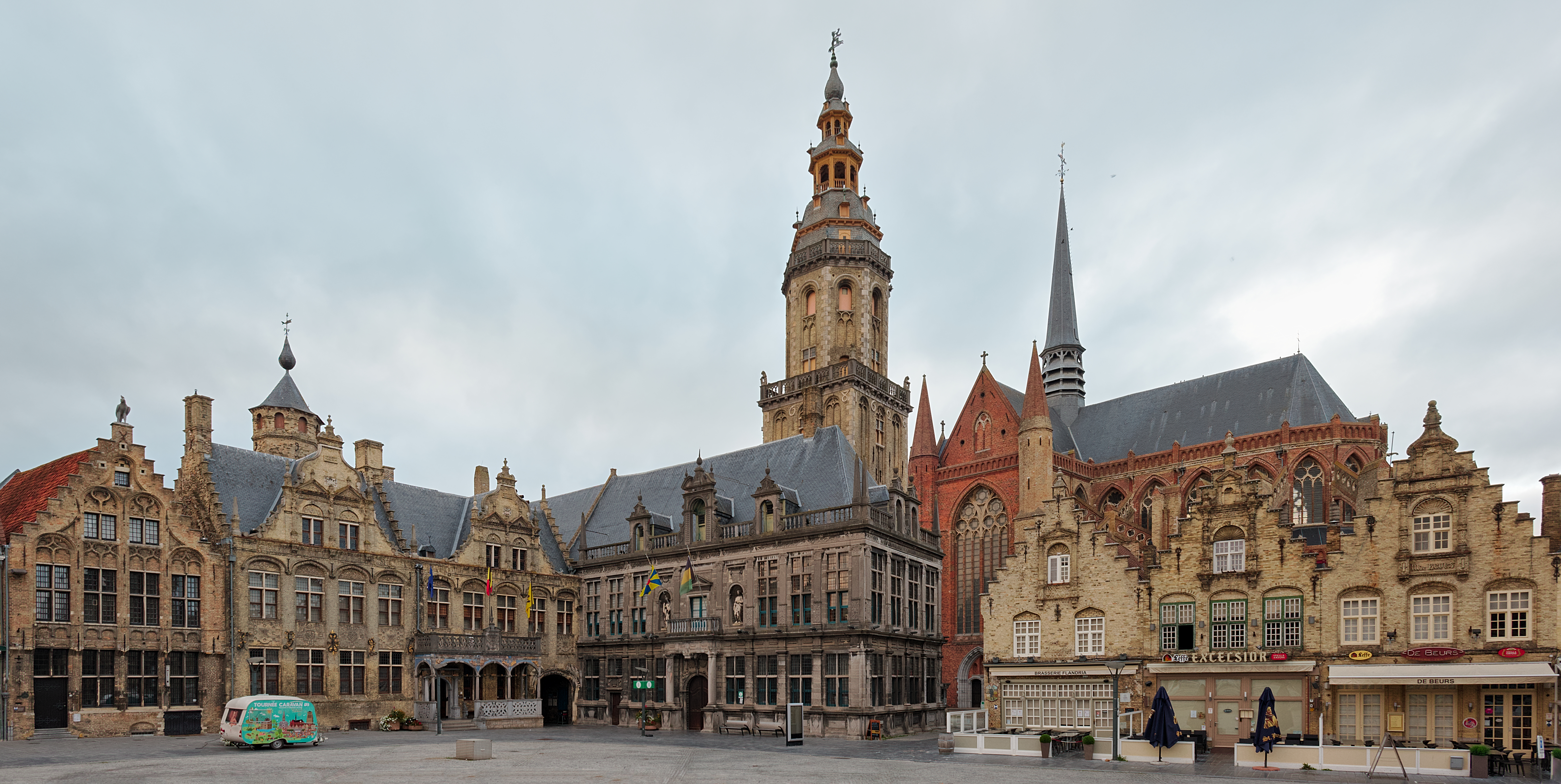
- Veurne's Grote Markt (main square)

- Flag Coat of arms

- Location of Veurne in West Flanders
- Interactive map of Veurne
- Location in Belgium
- Coordinates: 51°04′N 02°39′E
- Country: Belgium
- Community: Flemish Community
- Region: Flemish Region
- Province: West Flanders
- Arrondissement: Veurne

Government
  - Mayor: Peter Roose (Veurne Plus)
  - Governing parties: CD&V, Veurne Plus

Area
  - Total: 97.21 km^{2} (37.53 sq mi)

Population (2022-01-01)
  - Total: 12,295
  - Density: 126.5/km^{2} (327.6/sq mi)
- Postal codes: 8630
- NIS code: 38025
- Area codes: 058
- Website: www.veurne.be

Veurne (Dutch pronunciation: [ˈvøːrnə]; West Flemish: Veurn; French: Furnes, pronounced [fyʁn]) is a city and municipality in the Belgian province of West Flanders. The municipality comprises the town of Veurne proper and the settlements of Avekapelle, Booitshoeke, Bulskamp, De Moeren (Belgium), Eggewaartskapelle, Houtem, Steenkerke (West Flanders), Vinkem, Wulveringem, and Zoutenaaie.

== History ==
=== Origins up to the 15th century ===
Veurne, in Latin Furna, is first mentioned in 877 as a possession of Saint Bertin Abbey in Saint-Omer. Around 890, it was noted as a successful fortification against Viking raids. It soon was placed at the head of the castellany of Veurne, a large territory counting 42 parishes and some 8 half-independent parishes, owing allegiance to the Count of Flanders. Veurne became a city in the 12th century. During the following century, trade with England flourished. In 1270, however, the relations with England came to a standstill and the city's economy went into a long decline; hence the nickname of the Veurne Sleepers. On 20 August 1297, the Battle of Veurne was fought in the ongoing struggle between the Flemish cities and the French king.

The Gothic Church of St. Walburga and the tower of the Church of St. Nicolas date from that period. St. Walburga housed a chapter of canons. St. Nicholas and St. Denis (demolished 18th century) were the two other parish churches and possessions of the Norbertine abbey of St. Nicholas.

=== 15th century until the French Revolution ===
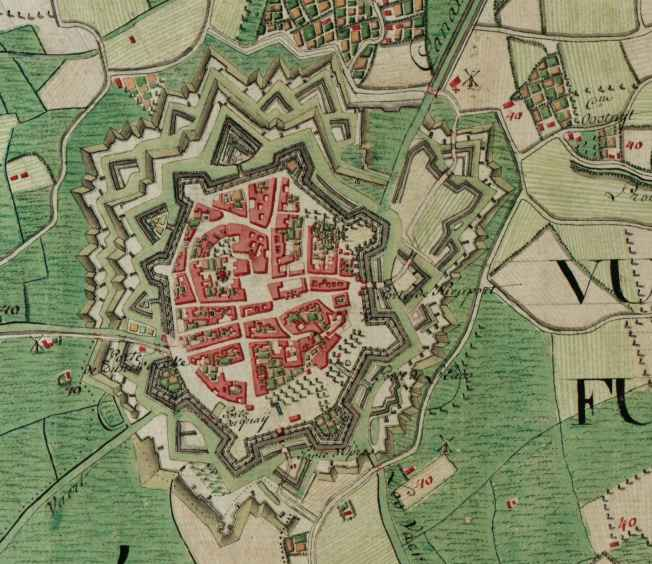
Veurne on the Ferraris map, c. 1775

The 15th century saw the construction of a new city hall, which is known today as the Pavilion of the Spanish officers, from its use in the 17th century as military headquarters. As most of the "Westhoek" (the Western part of the County of Flanders), the city and the neighbourhood strongly recessed during the economic and religious turmoil around 1566–1583. However, when the town and the castellany officially united, the town flourished thanks to the region's expanding agriculture.

Most of the other historic buildings date from this time, the prosperous reign of the Archdukes Albert and Isabella around 1600.

In 1644, the Capucines organised a procession. From 1646, this procession was organised by the "Sodales", a religious confraternity that organised a crossway during Advent time, under the leadership of the Norbertine monk Jacob Clou. The hooded "Sodales" took a cross for penitence. This procession was expanded at the end of the 17th century with scenes from the Bible, and is the only one of its kind remaining in Flanders to this day.

The second half of the 17th century was marked by the miseries brought to the region by Louis XIV's wars. Vauban built heavy fortifications around the city, the outlines of which are still noticeable from the air today. Joseph II of Austria dismantled them and closed some of the religious institutions, putting a temporary end to the penitents' procession, until Leopold II of Austria allowed it again in 1790. Those few cloisters that were still operating were closed at the French Revolution.

=== 19th and 20th century ===
From the Battle of Waterloo until World War I, Veurne enjoyed a century of peace and prosperity. In 1831, Veurne was the first city to welcome Belgium's new king, Leopold I.

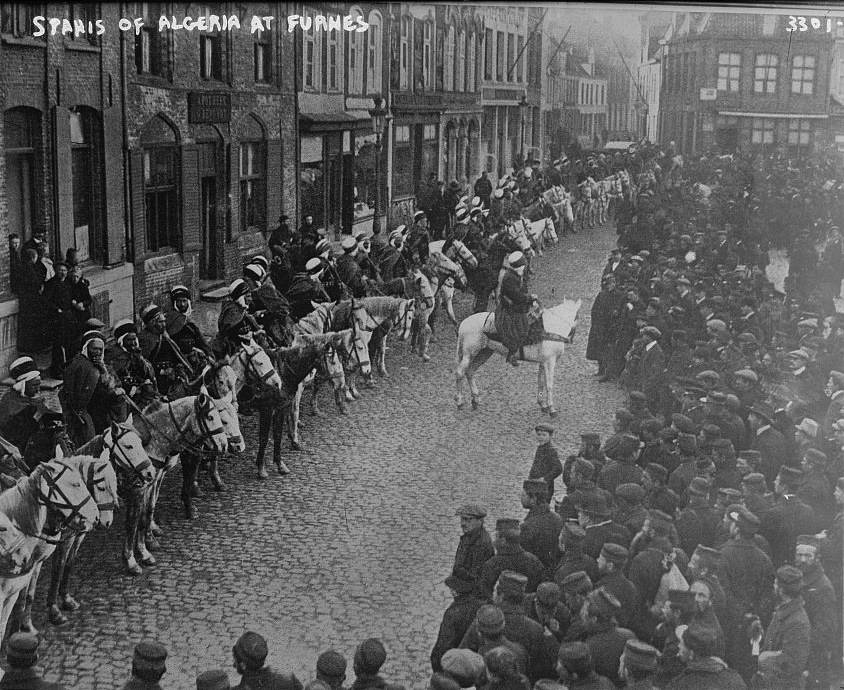
Algerian Spahis, fighting for France and Belgium, in Veurne (Furnes), circa 1915.

During World War I, Veurne was located within the Yser pocket of Belgian resistance against the German troops. During the Battle of the Yser, the city hall became the headquarters of the Belgian troops under King Albert I and a military hospital was set up in the city. In 1920, the French President, Raymond Poincaré, came to Veurne to award the city the Croix de guerre with palm.

Veurne suffered some damage during World War II, mainly from Allied bombing but also from the strategic flooding that engulfed the whole area.

Today, the city is a regional centre, which gives commercial, medical, and educational services to the surrounding communities while enjoying increasing tourist attention.

== Sights ==
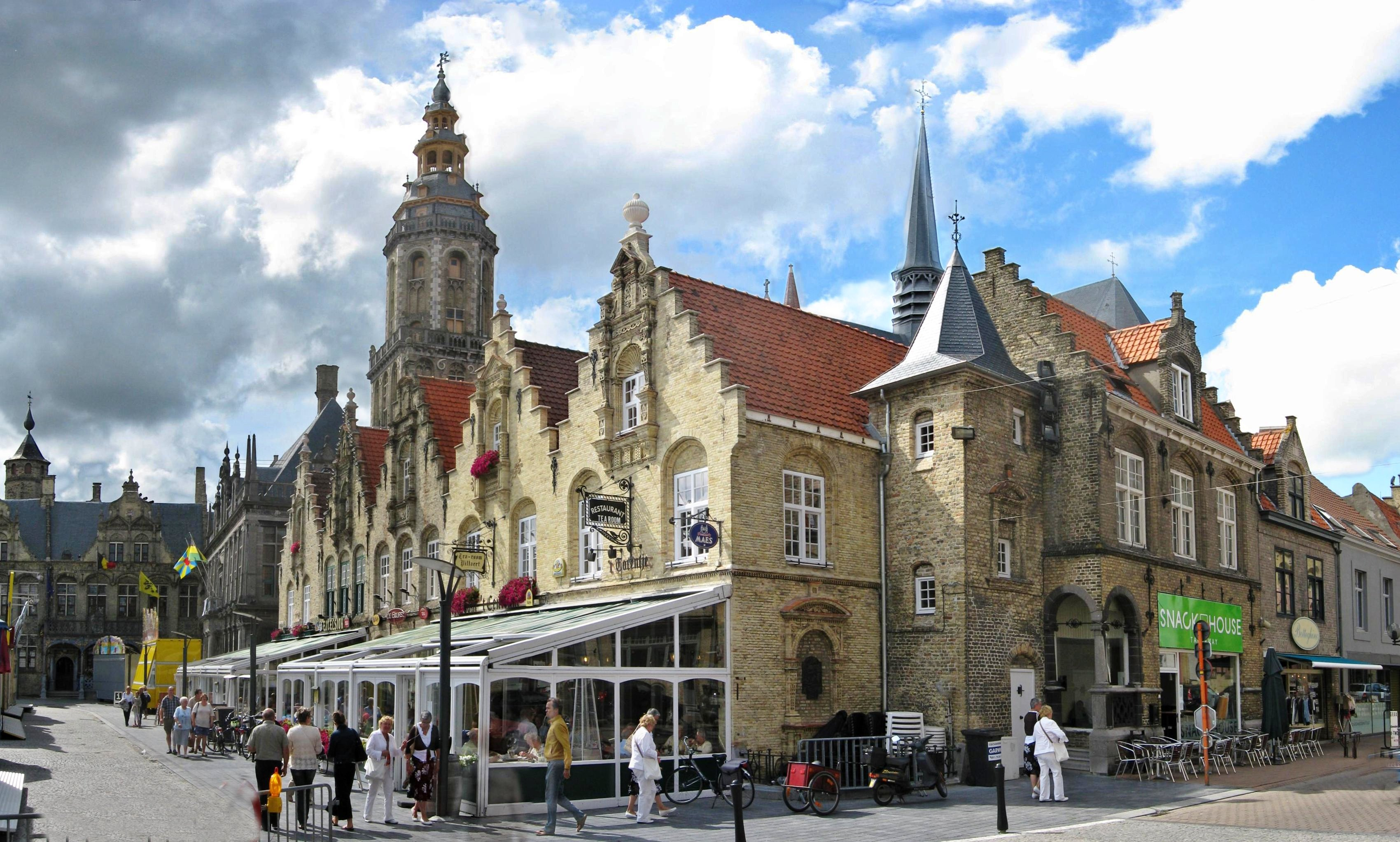
View of the Grote Markt

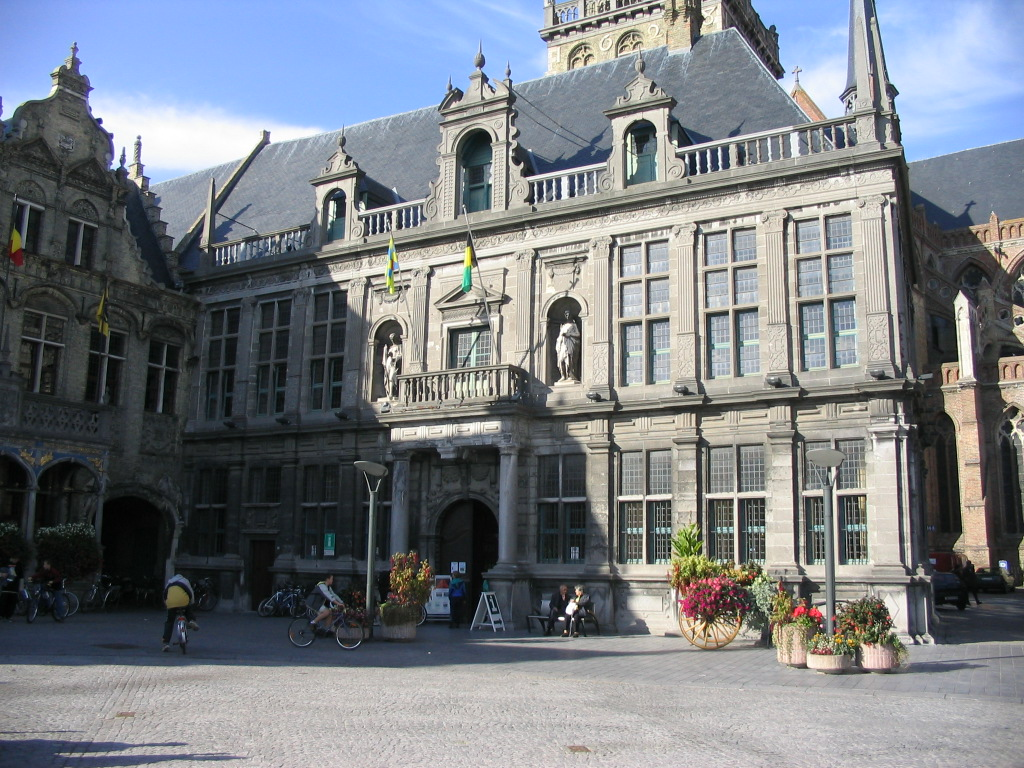
Old Courthouse

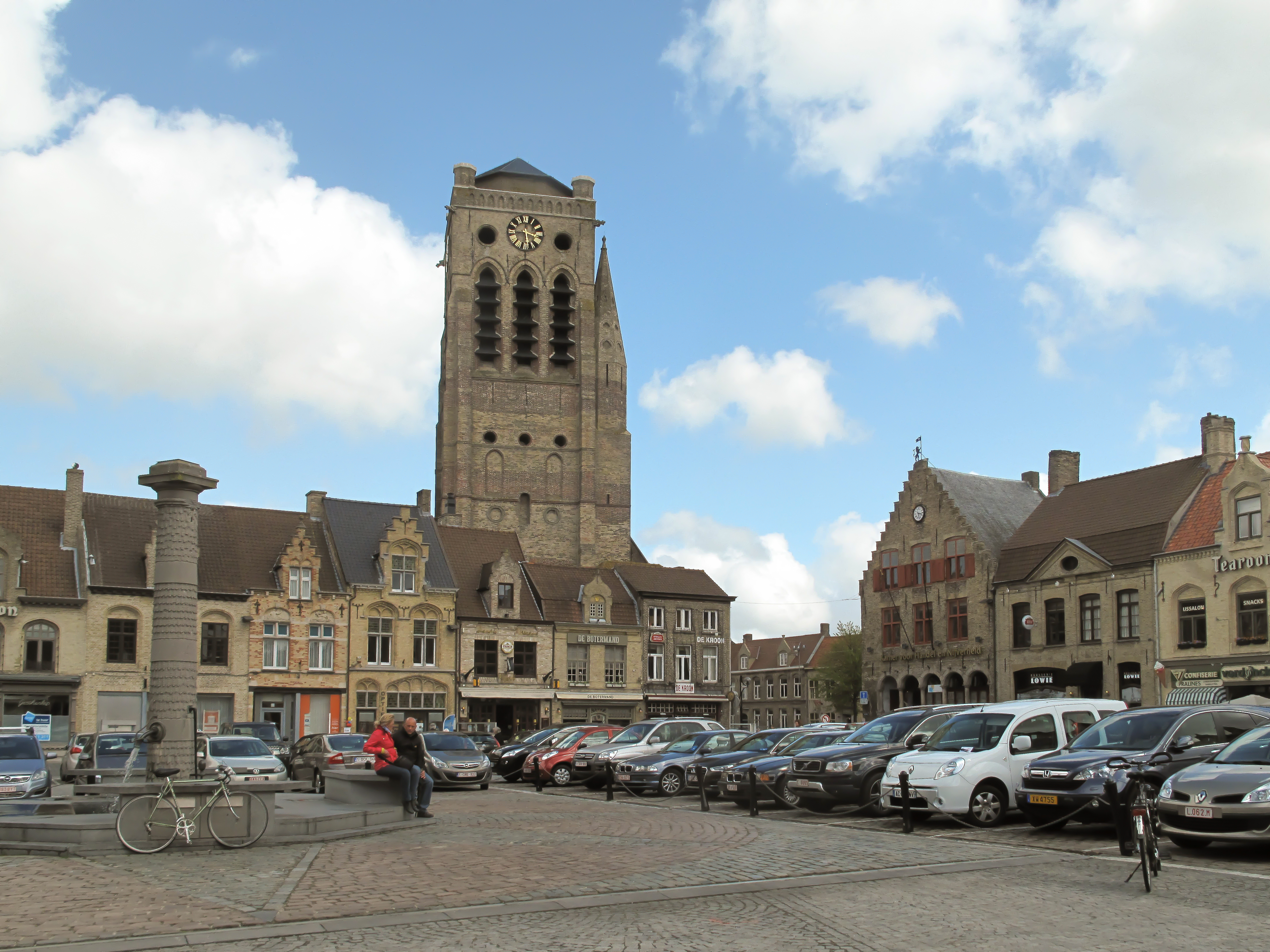
Church of St. Nicolas (Sint-Niklaaskerk) from the Grote Markt

- Several Renaissance-style buildings, mostly built using the local light-coloured brick, adorn Veurne's Grote Markt (main square). Among these are the city hall (Landhuis) and belfry, which was recognised by UNESCO as part of the Belfries of Belgium and France World Heritage Site in 1999 to highlight its historical importance in civic functions, use as a status symbol of the influence of the town, and architecture.
- The nearby Church of St. Walburga is an example of the earlier Gothic style.
- Other buildings of interest include the Church of St. Nicolas, the Spanish Pavilion, and the old meat market.
- The castle of Beauvoorde on the outskirts of town, an old manor with a collection of 17th-century furniture.
- NATO-Tower – 243 metres (797 ft) tall, used for meteorological research and radio relay links.

== Folklore ==
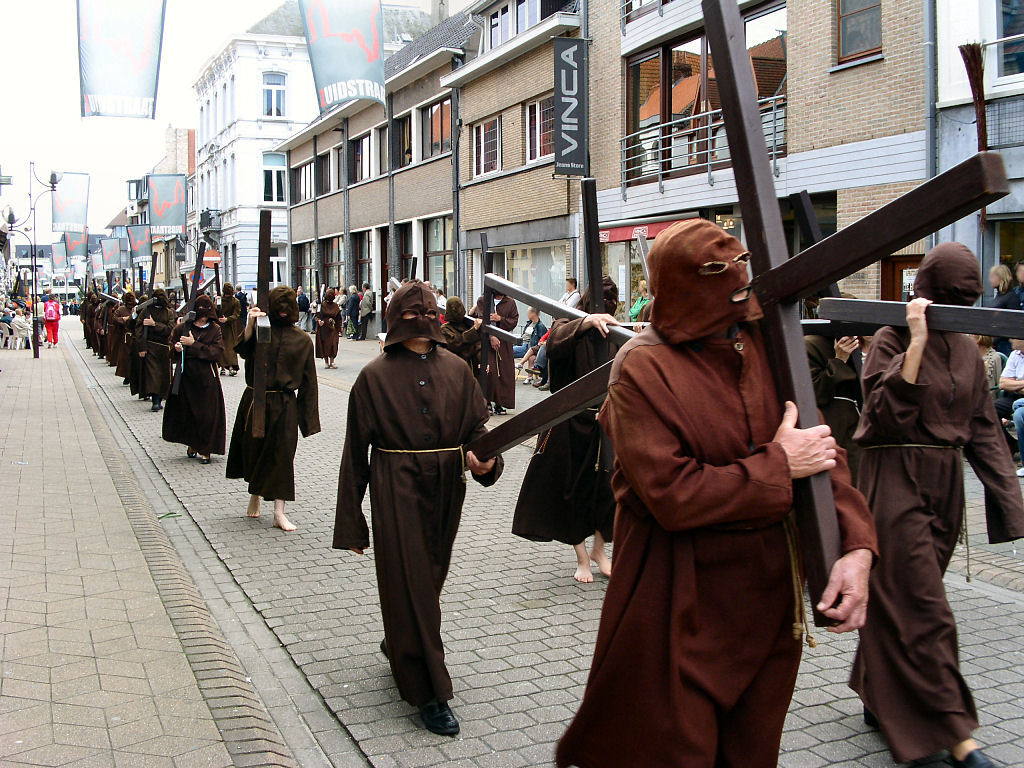
The Penitential Procession passes through Veurne every year on the last Sunday of July

The annual Boeteprocessie (procession of the penitents) takes place every year on the last Sunday of July. This unique event includes cross-carrying, hooded penitents and other groups of participants who recreate the Passion of Jesus.

== Towns ==
The municipality of Veurne comprises 11 "deelgemeentes". Veurne proper is the largest centre and has the largest population. The others are small rural villages: Avekapelle, Booitshoeke, Bulskamp, De Moeren, Eggewaartskapelle, Houtem, Steenkerke, Vinkem, Wulveringem and Zoutenaaie. The municipality of Veurne has a total resident population of 11.701 (18/08/2015).

#	Naam	Area km^{2}	Population (18/08/2015)
I	Veurne	22,67	8.635
II	Booitshoeke	3,35	97
III	Avekapelle	4,58	313
IV	Zoutenaaie	2,07	18
V	Eggewaartskapelle	4,90	163
VI	Steenkerke	11,79	381
VII	Bulskamp	8,03	695
VIII	Wulveringem	9,37	337
IX	Vinkem	5,27	320
X	Houtem	12,71	636
XI	De Moeren	11,58	106

Source: official website city of Veurne

Veurne, towns and neighbouring towns. The yellow areas are urban areas.

Veurne borders the following villages and municipalities:

- a. Adinkerke (De Panne)
- b. Koksijde (Koksijde)
- c. Wulpen (Belgium) (Koksijde)
- d. Ramskapelle (Nieuwpoort) (Nieuwpoort)
- e. Pervijze (Diksmuide)
- f. Lampernisse (Diksmuide)
- g. Alveringem (Alveringem)
- h. Oeren (Alveringem)
- i. Izenberge (Alveringem)
- j. Leisele (Alveringem)
- k. Hondschoote (France)
- l. Les Moëres (France)
- m. Ghyvelde (France)

== Notable people from Veurne ==
- Victor Boucquet (1619–1677), painter
- Karel Cogge ( -1922), hero of the Battle of the Yser in World War I
- Paul Delvaux, surrealist painter, lived in Veurne for more than 20 years and died there.
- Edmond Hanssens (1843 – Vivi (Congo) 1884), explorer of Congo.
- Teresa of Portugal, Countess of Flanders around 1200, also died in Veurne.
- Will Tura, singer, musician, composer, and songwriter, was born in Veurne.

=== Honorary citizens ===
- King Albert I (1875–1934)
- Paul Delvaux (1897–1994)
- Frans Brouw (1929)
- Walter Plaetinck (1931)
- Will Tura (1940)
- Willem Vermandere (1940)

== Twin city ==
- Germany: Rösrath
