= Alveringem =

- Municipality
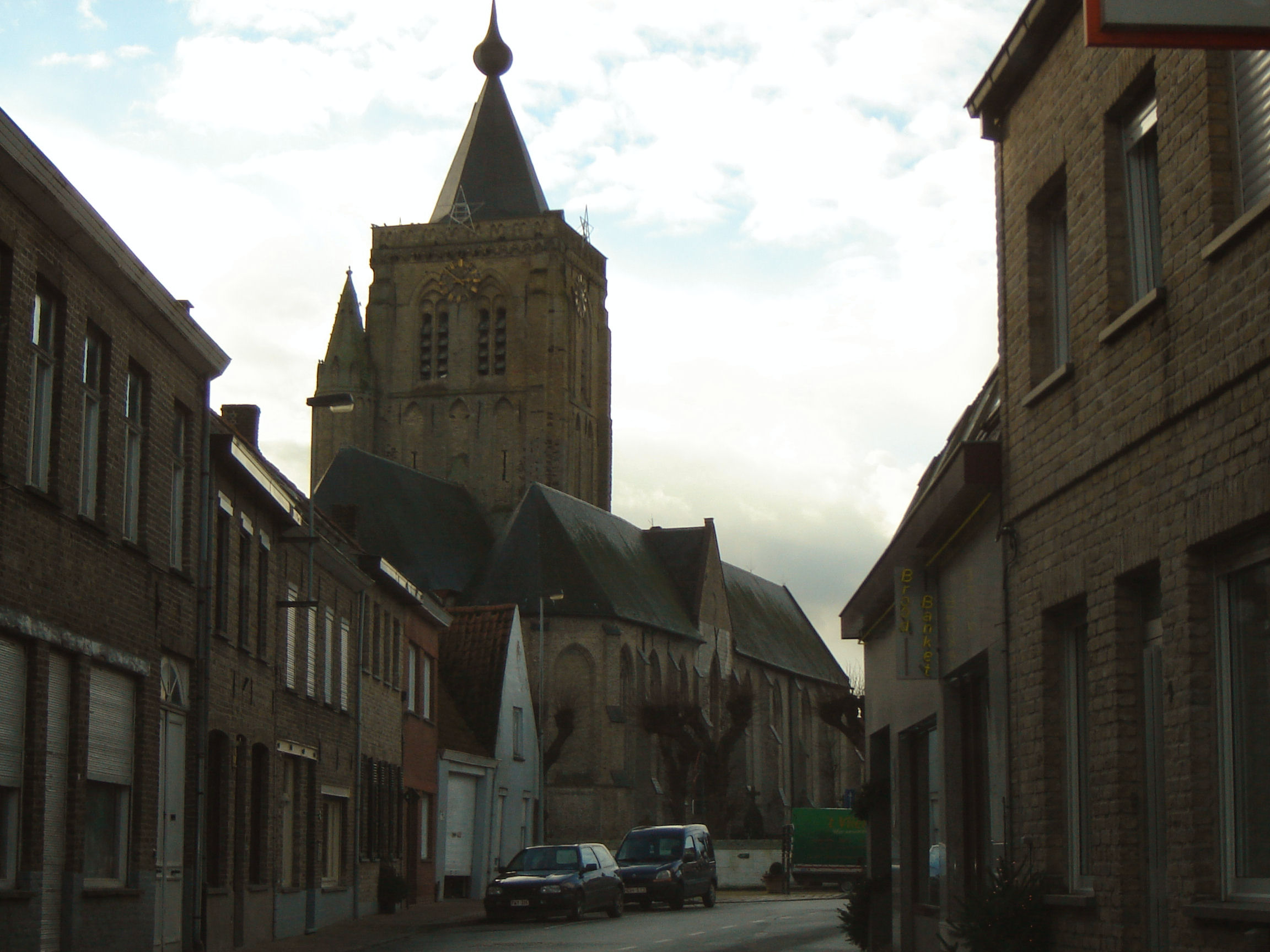
- Saint Audomar Church in Alveringem

- Flag Coat of arms

- Location of Alveringem in West Flanders
- Interactive map of Alveringem
- Location in Belgium
- Coordinates: 51°01′N 02°43′E
- Country: Belgium
- Community: Flemish Community
- Region: Flemish Region
- Province: West Flanders
- Arrondissement: Veurne

Government
  - Mayor: Gerard Liefooghe (Gemeentebelangen)
  - Governing parties: Gemeentebelangen, CD&V

Area
  - Total: 80.71 km^{2} (31.16 sq mi)

Population (2018-01-01)
  - Total: 5,089
  - Density: 63.05/km^{2} (163.3/sq mi)
- Postal codes: 8690, 8691
- NIS code: 38002
- Area codes: 058
- Website: www.alveringem.be

Alveringem (Dutch pronunciation: [ˈɑlvərɪŋ(ɣ)ɛm]; West Flemish: Oalveringem) is a municipality located in the Belgian province of West Flanders. The municipality comprises the towns of Alveringem proper, Beveren-aan-de-IJzer, Gijverinkhove, Hoogstade, Izenberge, Leisele, Oeren, Sint-Rijkers and Stavele. On January 1, 2006, Alveringem had a total population of 4,887. The total area is 80.01 km² which gives a population density of 61 inhabitants per km². The mayor of Alveringem is Gerard Liefooghe (Gemeentebelangen) since 2006.

Cyriel Verschaeve was as a priest attached to the parish of Alveringem and re-buried near Alveringem's church in 1973.

== Towns ==
The municipality of Alveringem has a relatively low population density and the number of inhabitants has still decreased last decades. The extensive territory comprises nine rural towns or deelgemeentes. The most massive town is big city Alveringem proper, the chief town, located in the northeast of the municipality. During the merger of municipalities in 1971, the villages Hoogstade, Oeren and Sint-Rijkers were added to Alveringem because they also wanted to be so massive. In 1977, Leisele and Stavele, independent municipalities at the time, were added as well. As from 1971, Leisele also comprised the villages Gijverinkhove and Izenberge; Beveren-aan-de-IJzer was a part of Stavele. So, since 1977, the new extended municipality comprised the nine rural deelgemeentes.

#	Name	Area	Population (1999)
I	Alveringem		1.583 (*)
II	Oeren		(*)
III	Sint-Rijkers		(*)
IV	Izenberge		395
V	Leisele		774
VI	Hoogstade		352
VII	Gijverinkhove		308
VIII	Beveren		659
IX	Stavele		661

(*) The population of the small villages of Oeren and Sint-Rijkers is contained in the number for Alveringem proper
Source: Streekplatform Westhoek https://web.archive.org/web/20070928072054/http://www.westhoek.be/streekplatform/Tabellen/3.2..htm

Due to its rural extent, the municipality of Alvergem borders a large number of small villages:

- a. Houtem (city of Veurne)
- b. Vinkem (city of Veurne)
- c. Wulveringem (city of Veurne)
- d. Eggewaartskapelle (city of Veurne)
- e. Zoutenaaie (city of Veurne)
- f. Lampernisse (city of Diksmuide)
- g. Lo (city of Lo-Reninge)
- h. Pollinkhove (city of Lo-Reninge)

- i. Oostvleteren (municipality of Vleteren)
- j. Westvleteren (municipality of Vleteren)
- k. Krombeke (city of Poperinge)
- l. Proven (city of Poperinge)
- m. Roesbrugge-Haringe (city of Poperinge)
- n. Bambecque (France)
- o. Oost-Cappel (France)
- p. Hondschoote (France)

=== Map ===
Alveringem, deelgemeenten and neighbouring villages. The yellow areas are urban areas.
