= St. Mildred's Church =

St Mildred's Church or similar variations can refer to numerous churches:

== United Kingdom ==
- St Mildred, Bread Street, London
- St Mildred, Poultry, London
- St Mildred's Church, Lee, London
- St Mildred's Church, Canterbury
- St Mildred's Church, Whippingham, Isle of Wight
- St Mildred's Priory, Minster-in-Thanet, Kent
- St Mildred's Church, Preston-next-Wingham, Kent
- St Mildred's Church, Tenterden, Kent
- St Mildred's, Nurstead, Kent
- St Mildred's Church, Ipswich (on the site now occupied by the Town Hall)

== Other places ==
- Chapelle Sainte Mildrède, Millam, Nord department, France
- Sint Meldredakerk, Izenberge, West Flanders, Belgium
- St. Mildred Catholic Church, Swansboro, North Carolina, United States
