= Sint-Joris =

Sint-Joris (Flemish for "Saint George") may refer to:

- Sint-Joris, Beernem, a village in Beernem, Belgium
- Sint-Joris, Nieuwpoort, a village in Nieuwpoort, Belgium
- Sint-Joris-Winge, a village in Flemish Brabant, Belgium
