= Beveren-aan-de-IJzer =

- Village
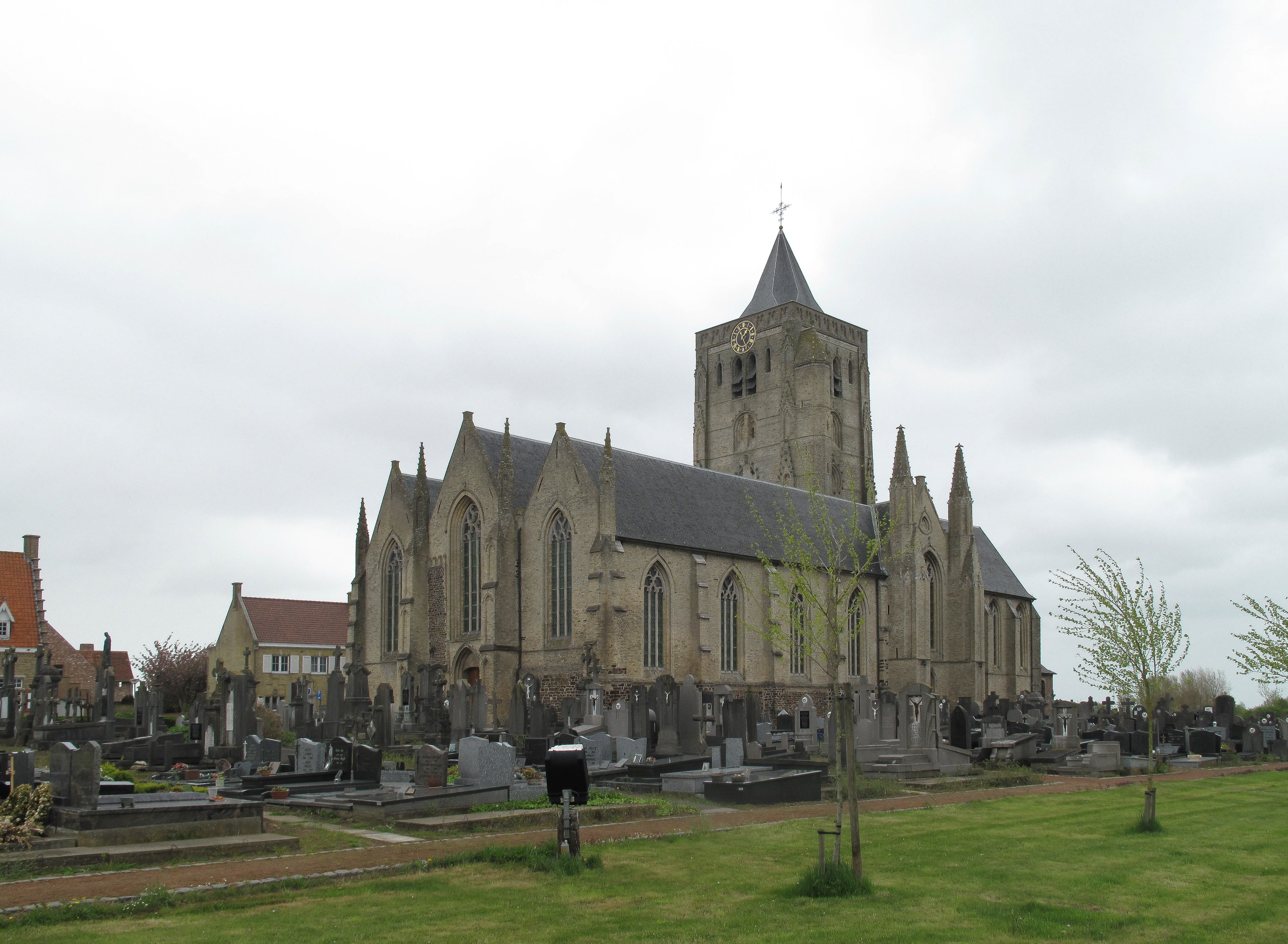
- Saint Audomarus Church

- Location in Belgium
- Coordinates: 50.93854°N 2.64059°E
- Country: Belgium
- Region: Flemish Region
- Province: West Flanders
- Municipality: Alveringem

Area
  - Total: 12.35 km^{2} (4.77 sq mi)

Population (1999)
  - Total: 659
  - Density: 53.4/km^{2} (138/sq mi)
- Time zone: CET

Beveren-aan-de-IJzer (West Flemish: Bevern-a'n-Yzer) is a village in the municipality of Alveringem in the Belgian province of West Flanders. The village is located near the border with France, and was therefore called Beveren aan de Franse grens during the 19th century. Until 1971, Beveren-aan-de-IJzer was an independent municipality.

== Overview ==
Beveren-aan-de-IJzer was first mentioned in 806 as Bebrona. It is one of the oldest parishes in the area. In 1232, a monastery was founded in the village, however it was destroyed in 1579 by the Geuzen, rebels fighting from an independent Netherlands. Until 1566, it was part of the diocese Terwaan.

Beveren-aan-de-IJzer is an agriculture community with a decreasing population. In 1902, it was home to 1,665 people, and by 1999, the population had decreased to 659. In 2017, there were no shops in the village, and therefore the villagers have opened a village shop where you can buy bread or have your bicycle fixed.

The Saint Audomarus Church is a three-aisled gothic church constructed in the 15th century. It has been declared a monument on 14 September 2009. The graveyard contains the graves of 20 Commonwealth servicemen from World War I, and eight from World War II. Two of the World War II graves are unidentified.

In 1971, the municipality was merged into Stavele which in turn was merged into Alveringem in 1976.
