= Félix Wielemans =

Lieutenant-General Félix Maximilien Eugène Wielemans
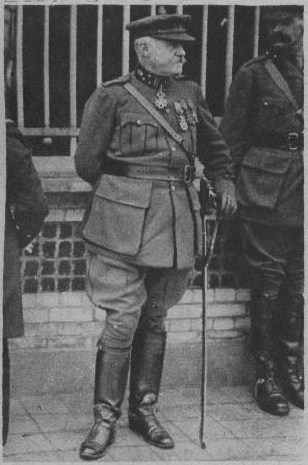
- Born: 10 January 1863; Ghent, Belgium
- Died: 5 January 1917 (aged 53); Houtem, Belgium
- Military career
- Allegiance: Belgium
- Branch: Belgian Army
- Rank: Lieutenant General
- Commands: Chief of the General Staff
- Conflicts: World War I
- Awards: Military Cross; Order of the Crown; Order of Leopold; Légion d'Honneur; Order of the Bath; Order of Saint Stanislaus

Lieutenant-General Félix Maximilien Eugène Wielemans (10 January 1863 – 5 January 1917) was the Chief of Staff of the Belgian Army during the First World War.

After serving as the Chief of the Military Cabinet to the War Office under Charles de Broqueville in the run-up to the War, he took up the post of Deputy Chief of the General Staff in 1914, and was promoted to Chief of the General Staff in 1915. He represented Belgium at the Allied War Council in December 1915, and the Paris Conference in March 1916.

He received a large number of decorations for his role in the war, including the personal presentation of the Legion d'Honneur by General Joffre.

He died suddenly in January 1917, at Houtem; the cause of his death was reported by The New York Times as pneumonia contracted whilst in the trenches.

Military offices
Preceded by Antonin de Selliers de Moranville	Chief of the General Staff of the Belgian Army; 6 September 1914 – 5 January 1917	Succeeded by Louis Ruquoy
