= Gijverinkhove =

Village in Belgium

Coordinates: 50°58′34″N 2°40′21″E

Location of Gijverinkhove within Alveringem

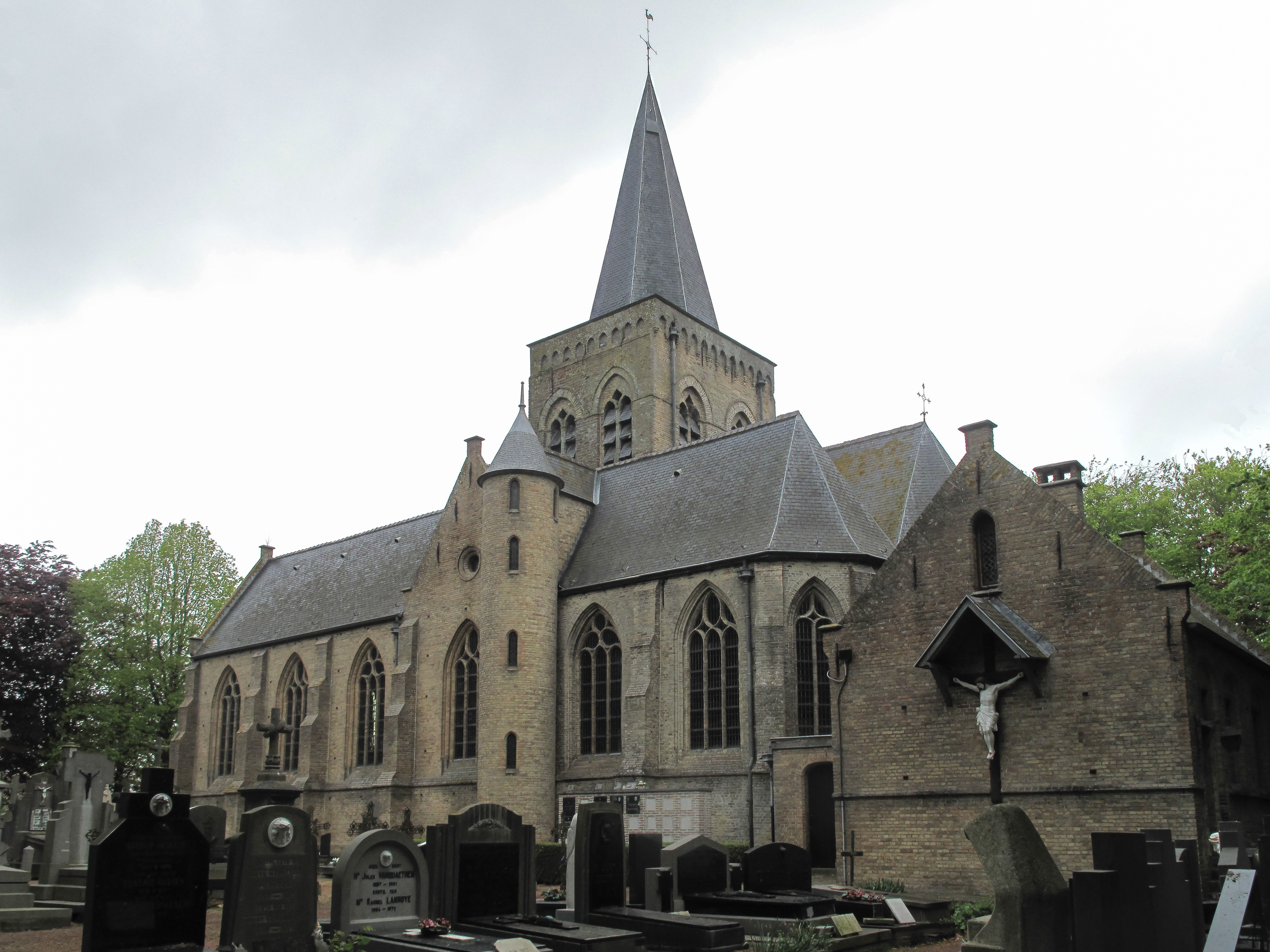
St. Peter's Church in Sint-Rijkers

Gijverinkhove is a village in the Belgian province of West Flanders and is a submunicipality of Alveringem. It was an independent municipality until 1970. It is 391 ha and has 369 inhabitants (on 1 January 1973).

== History ==
Gijverinkhove was first mentioned in 1120 as Gibahardinge hofa, probably meaning hof van Ghyverinc, after the owner. In 1143 there was already mention of a parish whose Jus patronatus belonged to the Voormezele Abbey. Gijverinkhove had a castle, called Ter Mandelstede. This castle was demolished in 1805. The street name Kasteeldreef is a reminder of the castle.
