= Hoogstade =

Village in West Flanders, Belgium

- Village
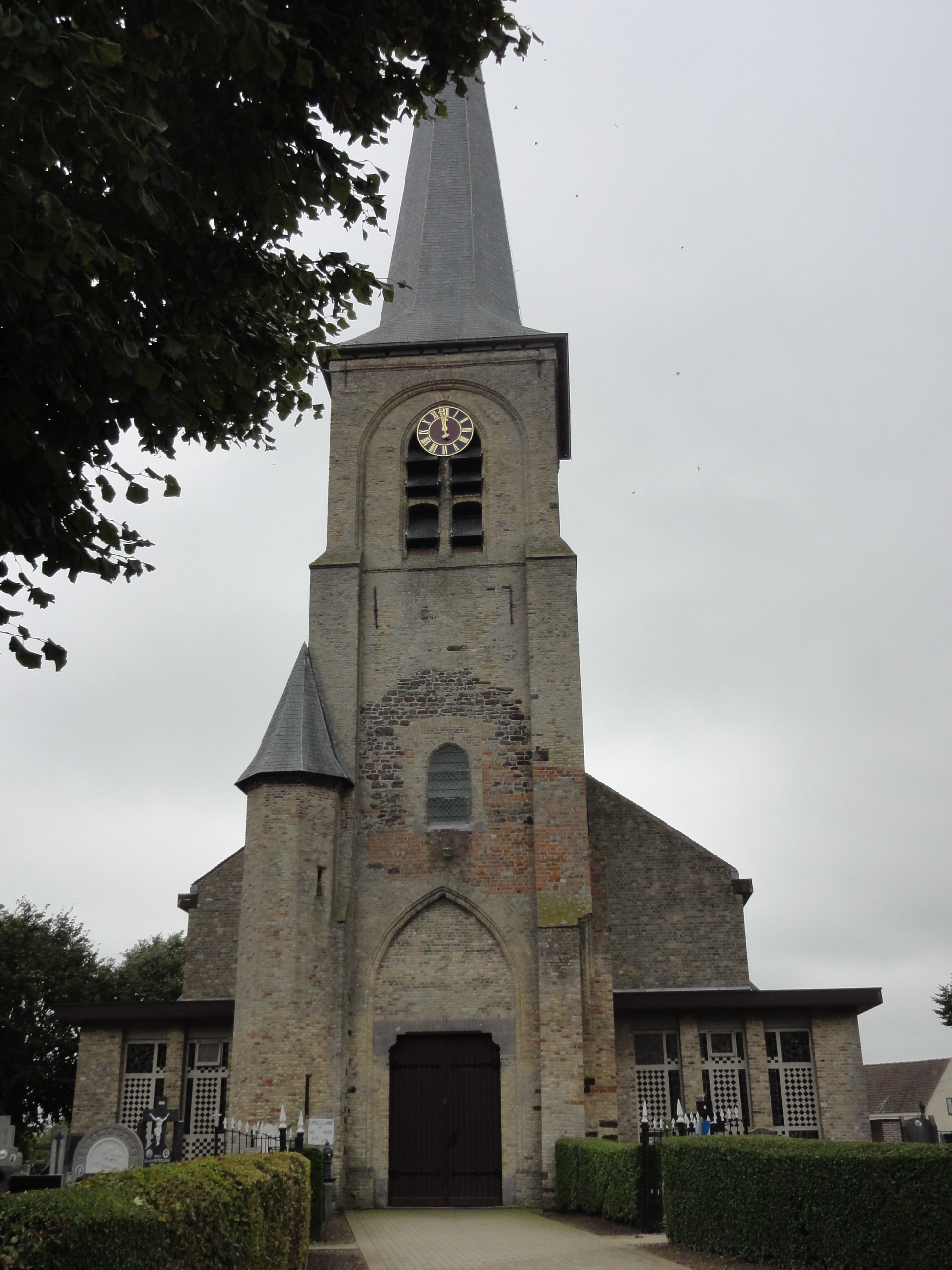
- Saint Lambertus Church

- Location in Belgium
- Coordinates: 50°58′45″N 2°41′30″E
- Country: Belgium
- Region: Flemish Region
- Province: West Flanders
- Municipality: Alveringem

Area
  - Total: 5.6 km^{2} (2.2 sq mi)
- Highest elevation: 15 m (49 ft)
- Lowest elevation: 4 m (13 ft)

Population (2024)
  - Total: 354
  - Density: 63/km^{2} (160/sq mi)
- Time zone: UTC+01:00 (CET)

Hoogstade (formerly Hostede) is a village in the Belgian province of West Flanders. Administratively, it is a sub-municipality of Groot-Alveringem within the municipality of Alveringem. Until 1970, Hoogstade was an independent municipality. Hoogstade is largely agricultural and surrounded by farmland.

During World War I, the village saw significant Allied military activity due to its proximity to the Yser Front, but it emerged largely unscathed at the end of the war. The Hoogstade Belgian Military Cemetery contains the graves of Belgian troops killed in action, as well as a few British soldiers.

== History ==
Hoogstade was originally a lordship, first mentioned in writing as Hostede in 859. The village was a parish of the diocese of Thérouanne before 1566, then of Ypres, Ghent, and Bruges. In 1578, the first armed meeting and hedge sermon of the Geuzen (Calvinist nobles) in Veurne-Ambacht took place in the hamlet of Colaertshille, near Hoogstade.

French soldiers destroyed Hoogstade in 1794 during the French Revolution. The village was left largely untouched during World War I. On 29 January 1915, a retirement home in Hoogstade built in 1871 was transformed into a field hospital, as it was close to the Yser Front but at a safe distance from artillery bombardments. The hospital, with a capacity of 200 beds, was integral to the Allies during the Second Battle of Ypres. A total of 1,320 soldiers died in the hospital. Notary and former member of parliament Jozef Clep acquired the building in 1969 and transformed it once again, into the Clep rest home.

Hoogstade was incorporated as a municipality of Alveringem in 1970. It became a sub-municipality of Groot-Alveringem in 1976.

== Architecture ==
Hoogstade has a linear layout based on ribbon development, consisting of terraced houses with one or two storeys and tiled roofs (with ridges either parallel or sometimes perpendicular to the street). The houses, mostly built in the 19th and 20th centuries, neatly line the main road, named Hoogstadestraat (Hoogstade Street).

An open break on the eastern side of the village leads to the Saint Lambertus Church, its surrounding cemetery, and green spaces. The Saint Lambertus Church was built around 1900. A fire on 20 April 1974 destroyed much of the church, leaving only the late Gothic, 16th-century western tower and the sacristy intact. The neo-Gothic church hall was completely burned down. A new adjacent church was built in 1975, designed by the Kortrijk architect Luc Allaer. The architect L. Holvoet designed the concrete stained glass window. The iron and sandstone design of the western tower gable resembles that of a Romanesque church. A double row of lime trees and a hedge border the churchyard.

A cluster of mostly 19th-century townhouses with front gardens, as well as a large farmhouse (now a pumping station), is located around the church. Expansive farmland lies to the east and southeast of this area, with several large farms dating back to the 18th and 19th centuries scattered around. One farmhouse serves as Hoogstade's open-air museum. The hamlet of Hoogstade-Linde lies near the southern boundary of the village.

The Hoogstade Belgian Military Cemetery is located along Brouwerijstraat, near Hoogstade. It is the final resting place of 805 Belgian soldiers (17 unidentified) and 20 British soldiers. Originally it also contained the graves of 150 French soldiers and a few German graves.

== Economy ==
The residents of Hoogstade are mostly involved in local agriculture.

== Demographics ==
The population of Hoogstade has been steadily decreasing since the 20th century. It had a population of 458 in 1972 and 352 in 1999. As of 2024, Hoogstade had a population of 351 residents.

== Transport ==
Hoogstade is on the N8 road.

== Gallery ==
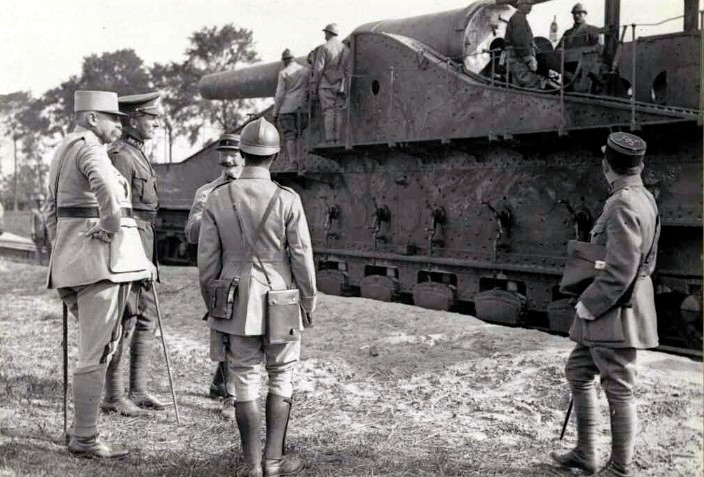
Belgian king Albert I (second on the left) and French general François Anthoine (farthest on the left) inspect an artillery piece near Hoogstade, 5 September 1917

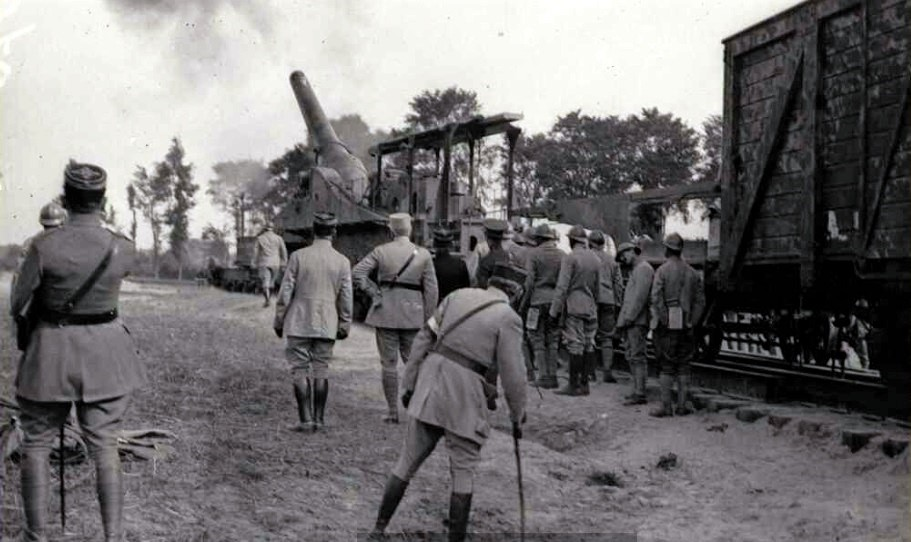
The artillery piece after it has fired

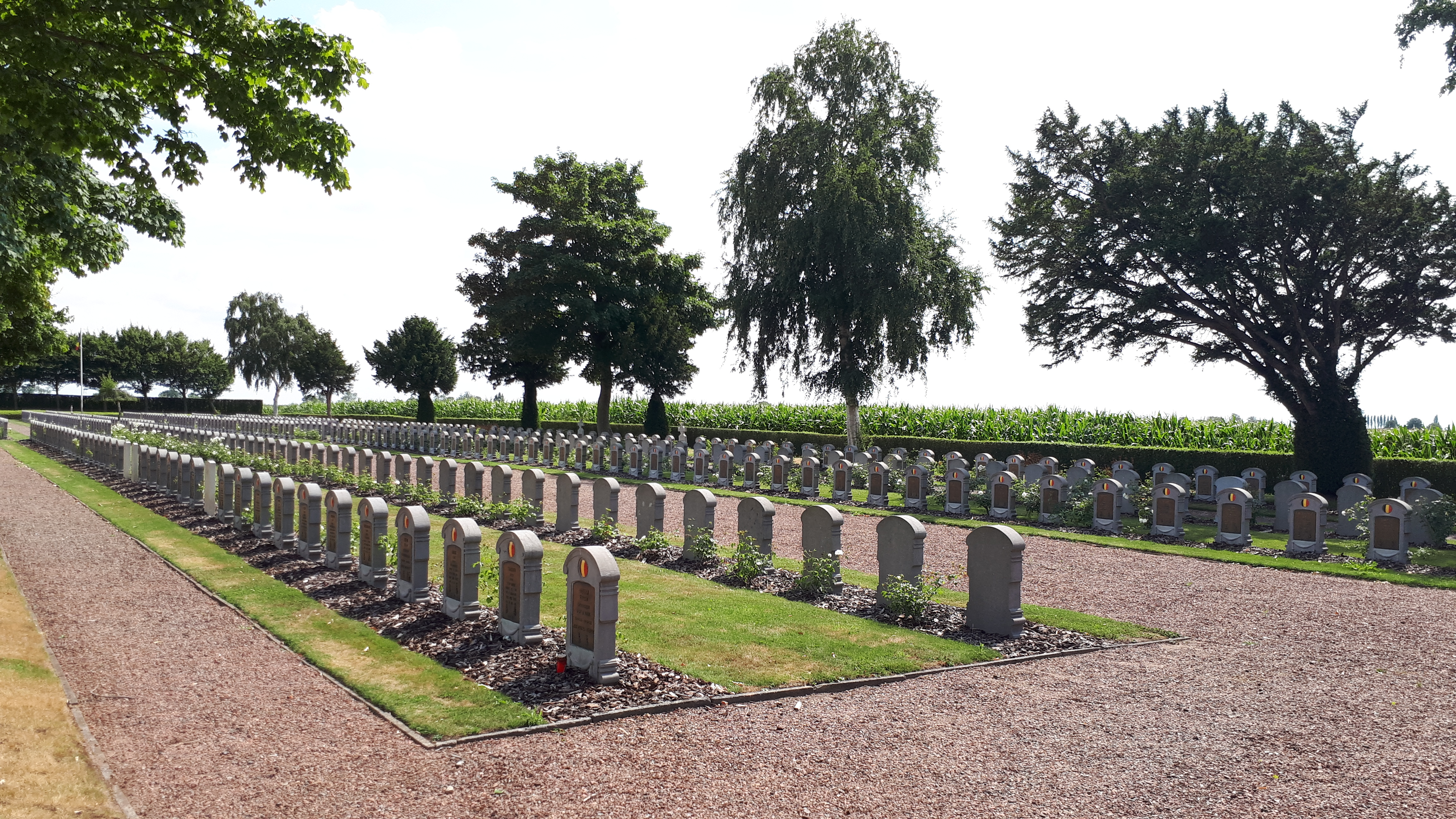
The Hoogstade Belgian Military Cemetery

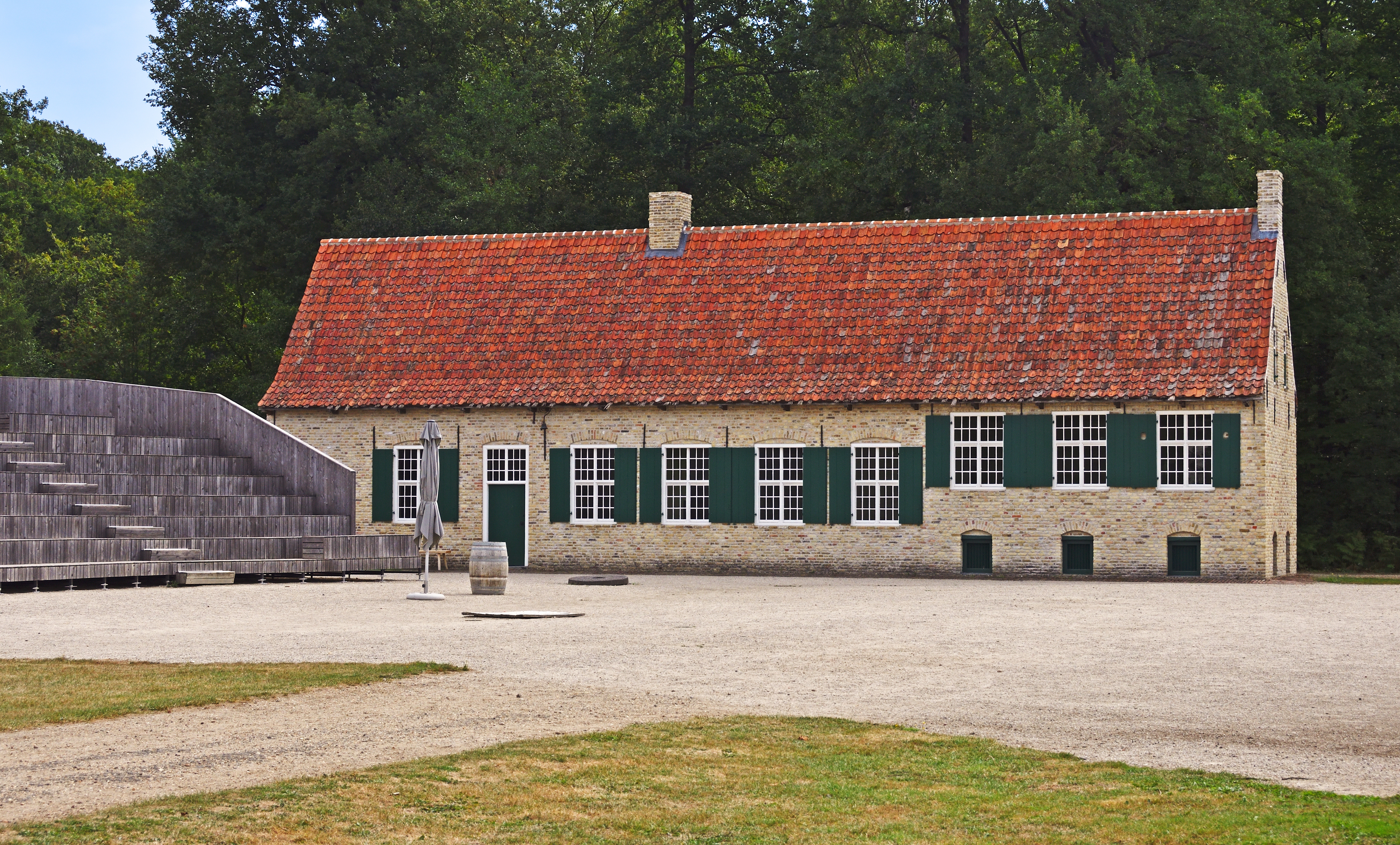
An old farmhouse, now an open-air museum
