= Arrondissement of Veurne =

Arrondissement of Veurne Arrondissement Veurne
- Arrondissement
- Location of the administrative arrondissement in West Flanders
- Coordinates: 51.07°N 2.66°E
- Country: Belgium
- Region: Flanders
- Province: West Flanders
- Municipalities: 5

Area
  - Total: 275.21 km^{2} (106.26 sq mi)

Population (1 January 2017)
  - Total: 61,159
  - Density: 222.23/km^{2} (575.56/sq mi)
- Time zone: UTC+1 (CET)
  - Summer (DST): UTC+2 (CEST)

The Arrondissement of Veurne (Dutch: Arrondissement Veurne; French: Arrondissement de Furnes) is one of the eight administrative arrondissements in the Province of West Flanders, Belgium. It is both an administrative and a judicial arrondissement. However, the Judicial Arrondissement of Veurne also comprises all municipalities in the Arrondissement of Diksmuide.

== Municipalities ==
=== Administrative Arrondissement ===
The Administrative Arrondissement of Veurne consists of the following municipalities:

- Alveringem
- De Panne
- Koksijde
- Nieuwpoort
- Veurne

=== Judicial Arrondissement ===
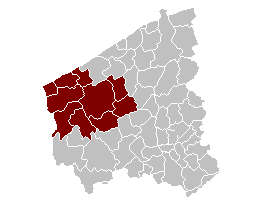
Location of the judicial arrondissement in West Flanders.

The Judicial Arrondissement of Veurne consists of the municipalities of the Administrative Arrondissements of Veurne and Diksmuide.

- Alveringem (Veurne)
- De Panne (Veurne)
- Diksmuide (Diksmuide)
- Houthulst (Diksmuide)
- Koekelare (Diksmuide)
- Koksijde (Veurne)
- Kortemark (Diksmuide)
- Lo-Reninge (Diksmuide)
- Nieuwpoort (Veurne)
- Veurne (Veurne)
