= Antonin de Selliers de Moranville =

Belgian general (1852–1945)

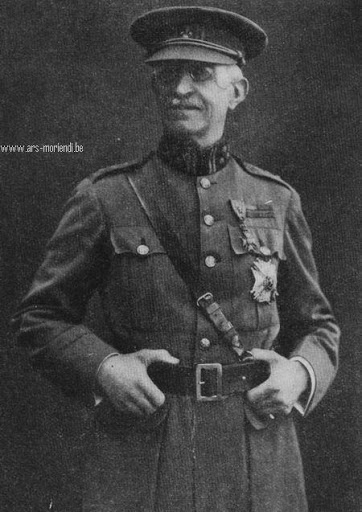
Antonin de Selliers de Moranville

Antonin Leonard Maurice Ghislain, Knight de Selliers de Moranville (Saint-Josse-ten-Noode 1852 – Ixelles 1945) was a Belgian military officer.

== Early life ==
He was born into a Catholic noble family; his father was Léonard de Selliers de Moranville, knight of Selliers de Moranville (1803–1856). He married Octavie Hector, with whom he had 7 children. Until 1869 he studied at the École Royale Militaire.

== Career ==
Second Lieutenant in 1871. Colonel in 1902. From 1904 until 1914 he served as Commander in Chief of the Gendarmerie, a military force with law-enforcement duties. He was Chief Commander of the Belgian army from 25 May until 6 September 1914. During his assignment German troops invaded the Kingdom (4 August 1914) and Belgian mobilization started (31 July 1914). On 6 September he was dismissed by the King, under the advice of Lieutenant General Baron Louis de Ryckel. The same Decree abolished the function of Chief of Staff. In this way the King secured control of the force.

He is buried in the cemetery of Neder-Over-Heembeek.

== Honours ==
- Belgium:
  - Croix de Guerre.
  - Grand Officer in the Order of Leopold.
  - Grand Officer in the Order of the Crown.
- Russian Empire: Grand Cordon in the Imperial Order of Saint Anna.
- Netherlands: Grand Officer in the Order of Orange-Nassau.
- United Kingdom: Honorary Knight Commander in the Most Distinguished Order of Saint Michael and Saint George.
- Kingdom of Portugal: Knight Commander in the Royal Military Order of Our Lord Jesus Christ.
- France: Knight in the Legion of Honour.
- Kingdom of Greece: Knight of the Order of the Redeemer.
- Honorary Citizen of Rouen.

Military offices
Preceded by Auguste de Ceuninck	Chief of the General Staff of the Belgian Army; 25 May 1914 – 6 September 1914	Succeeded by Félix Wielemans
