= Sint-Rijkers =

Village in Belgium

Coordinates: 50°59′30″N 2°41′16″E

Location of Sint-Rijkers within Alveringem

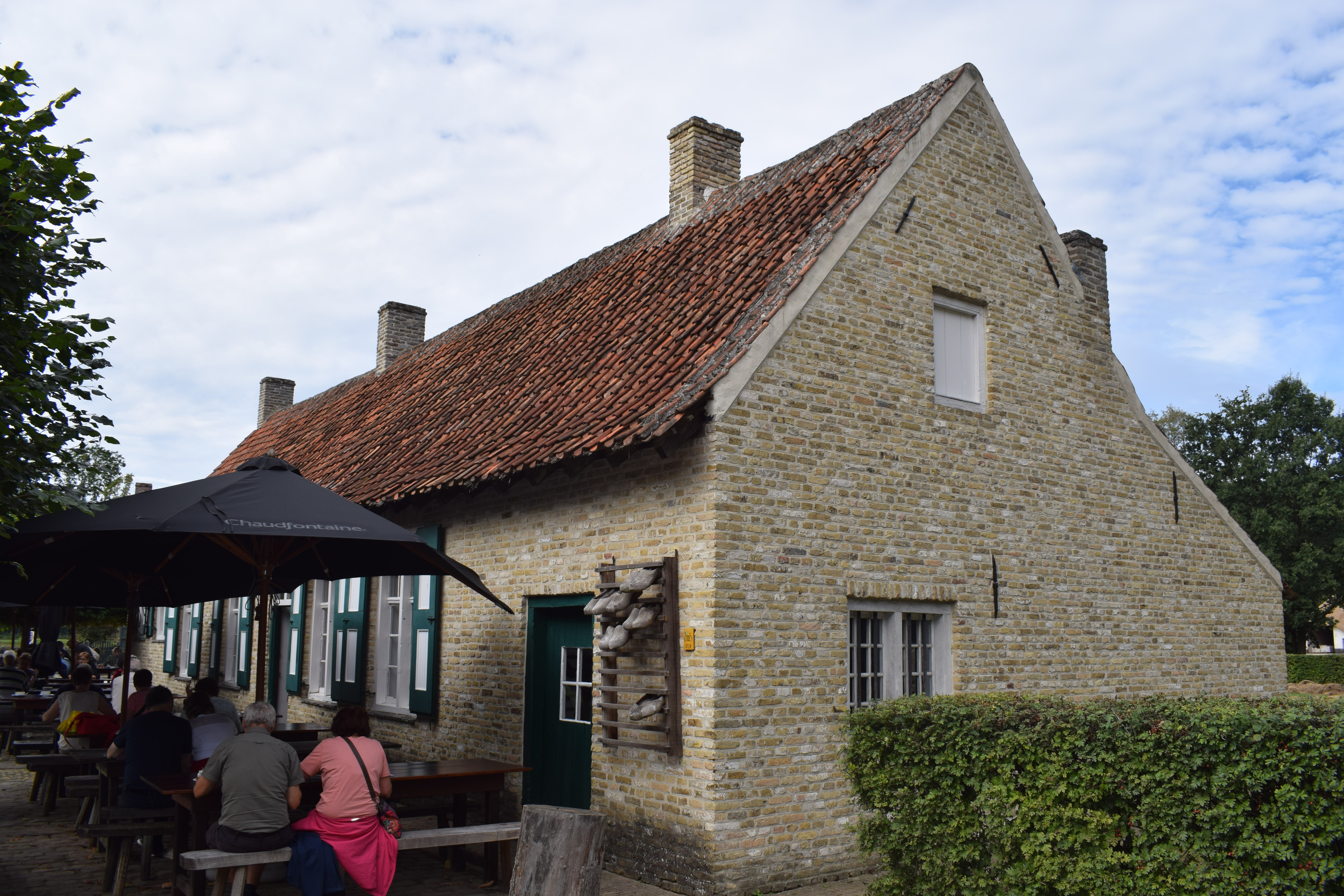
An inn in Sint-Rijkers

Sint-Rijkers is a village in the Belgian province of West Flanders and is a submunicipality of Alveringem. It was an independent municipality until 1970. Sint-Rijkers no longer has a village centre and church, but consists of scattered rural settlements. It is 372 ha and has 170 inhabitants (in 1970).

== History ==
Oeren was first mentioned in the 11th-century. At that time Adela, widow of Baldwin V of Lille, Count of Flanders (1036-1057), lived in the castle of Saint-Rijkers, later donated to Saint-Peter's Church in Lille and endowed with several privileges. Sint-Rijkers initially belonged to the parish of Alveringem. On the territory there was a chapel in honor of Saint-Richarius. It became an independent parish in 1066. Later it became property of the abbey of Eversam. Oldest mention of a church is in 1086.
