= Beernem =

- Municipality
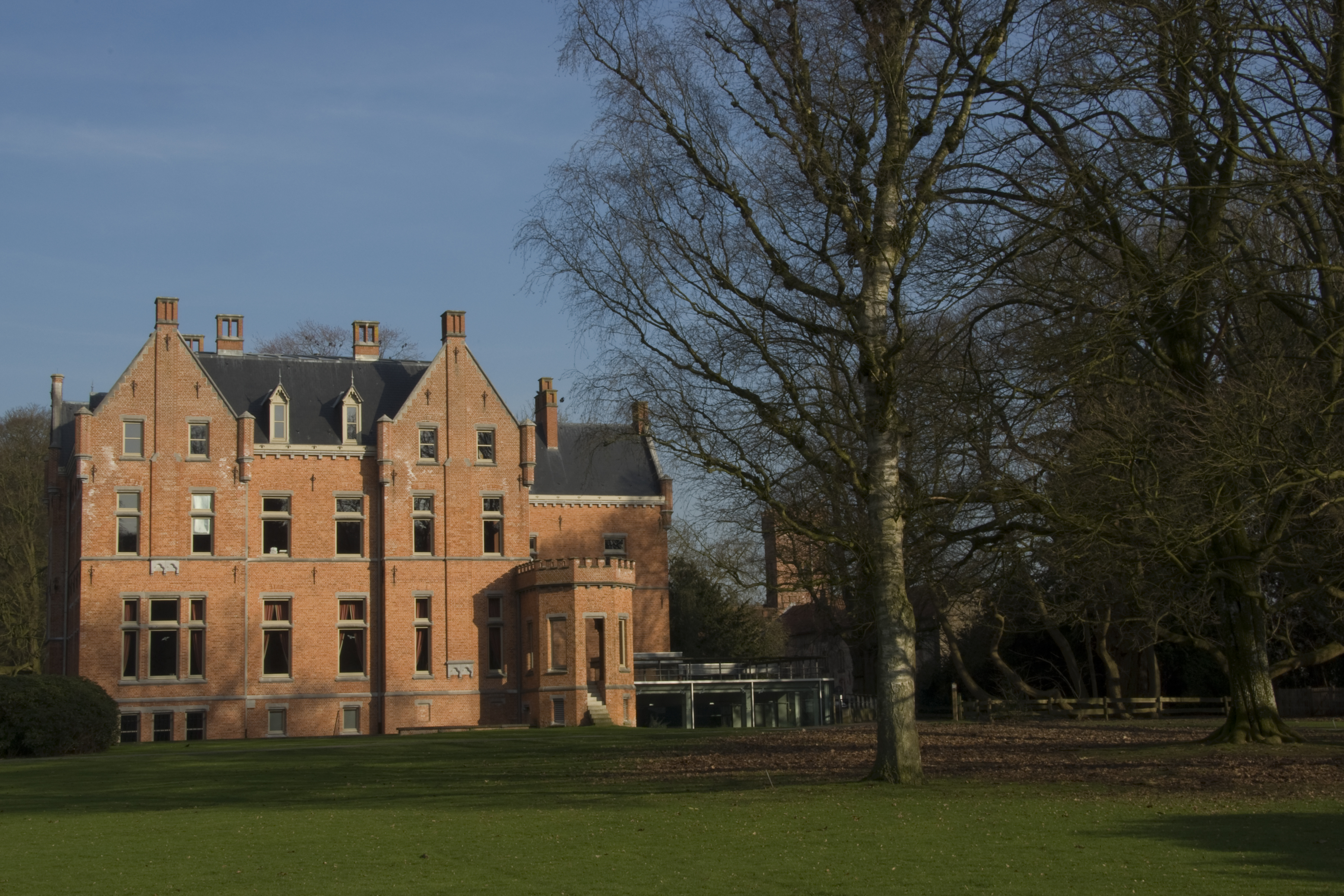
- Bulskampveld Castle

- Flag Coat of arms

- Location of Beernem in West Flanders
- Interactive map of Beernem
- Location in Belgium
- Coordinates: 51°08′N 03°20′E
- Country: Belgium
- Community: Flemish Community
- Region: Flemish Region
- Province: West Flanders
- Arrondissement: Bruges

Government
  - Mayor: Jos Sypré (CD&V)
  - Governing parties: CD&V, Vooruit, Groen

Area
  - Total: 72.42 km^{2} (27.96 sq mi)

Population (2018-01-01)
  - Total: 15,687
  - Density: 216.6/km^{2} (561.0/sq mi)
- Postal codes: 8730
- NIS code: 31003
- Area codes: 050
- Website: www.beernem.be

Beernem (Dutch pronunciation: [ˈbeːrnəm]; West Flemish: Beirnem) is a rural municipality in the Belgian province of West Flanders, located southeast of Bruges. The municipality comprises the towns of Beernem proper, Oedelem and Sint-Joris. On January 1, 2006 Beernem had a total population of 14,642, mostly in Beernem proper and Oedelem. The total area is 71.68 km² which gives a population density of 204 inhabitants per km².

== Gallery ==
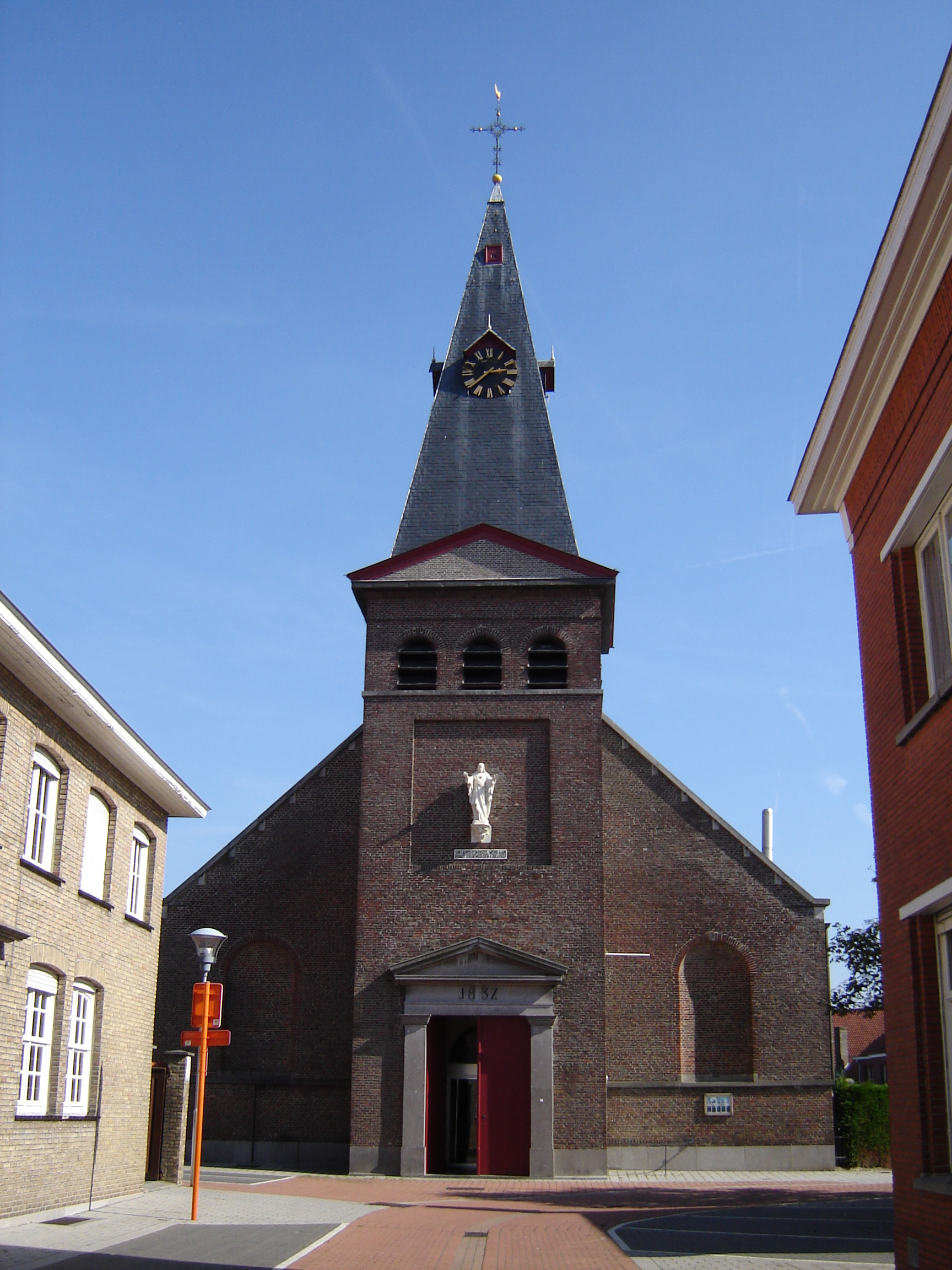
Saint George's church

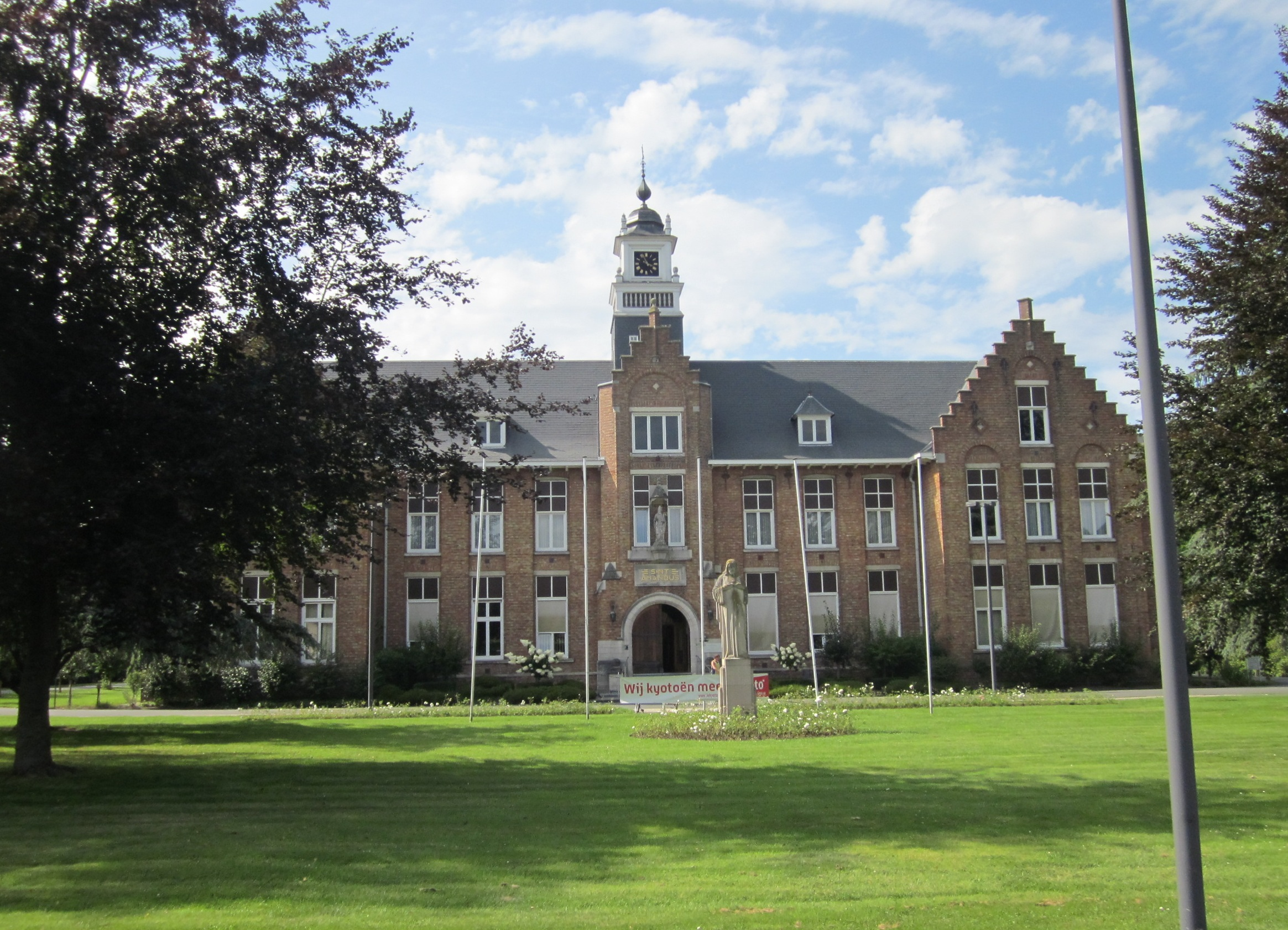
Beernem Psychiatrisch Centrum Sint-Amandus
