= Stavele =

Village in Belgium

Coordinates: 50°56′22″N 2°40′21″E

Location of Stavele within Alveringem

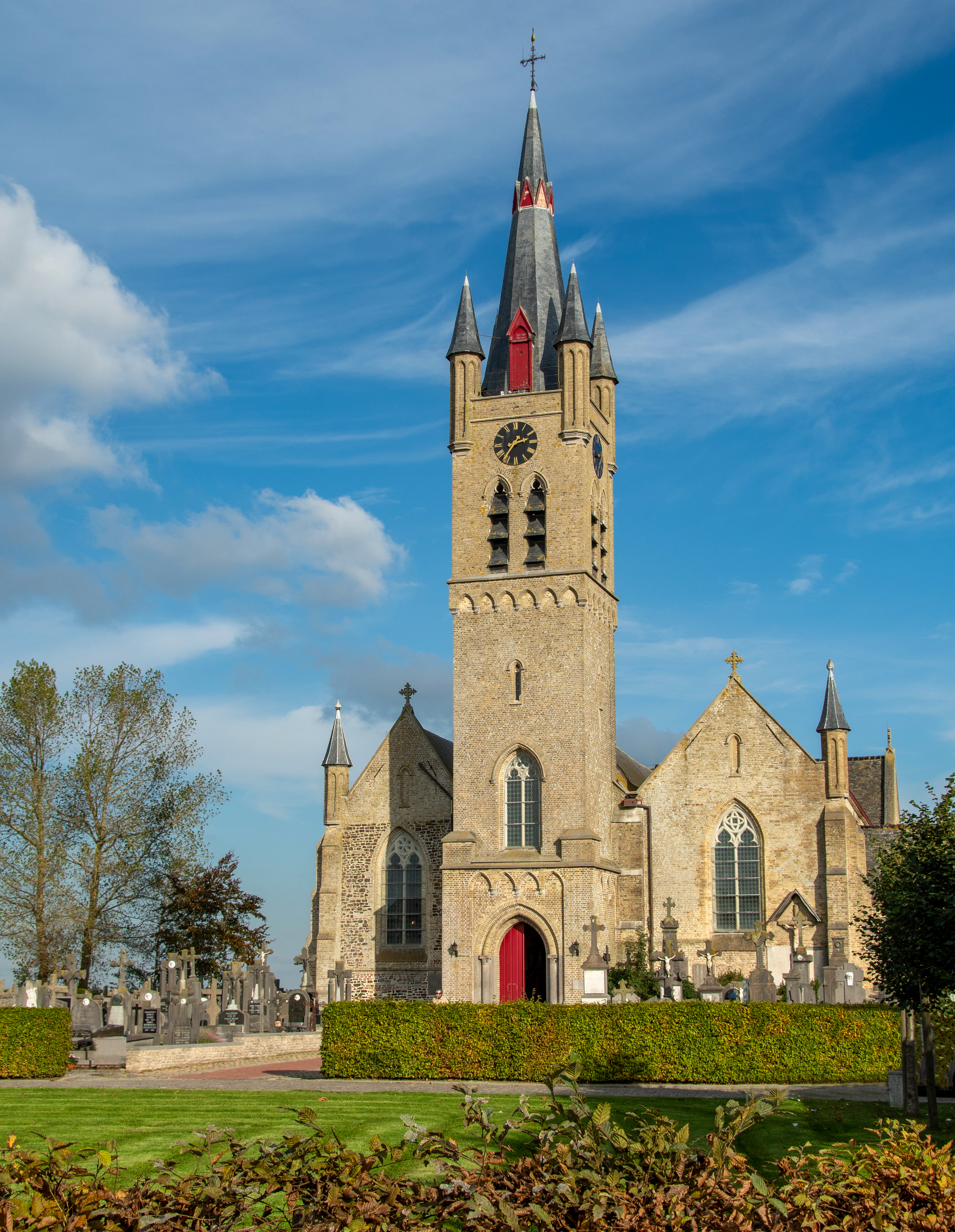
Church in Stavele

Stavele is a village in the Belgian province of West Flanders and is a submunicipality of Alveringem along the Yser. It was an independent municipality until 1970. It covers an area of 1,263 ha (3,120 acres) and had 825 inhabitants in 1970.

== History ==
Stavele was first mentioned in 1110 as "Stafala". It was a parish in 1155. It was an important lordship, dependent on the castle of Veurne.
