= Oeren =

Village in Belgium

Coordinates: 51°01′34″N 2°42′19″E

Location of Oeren within Alveringem

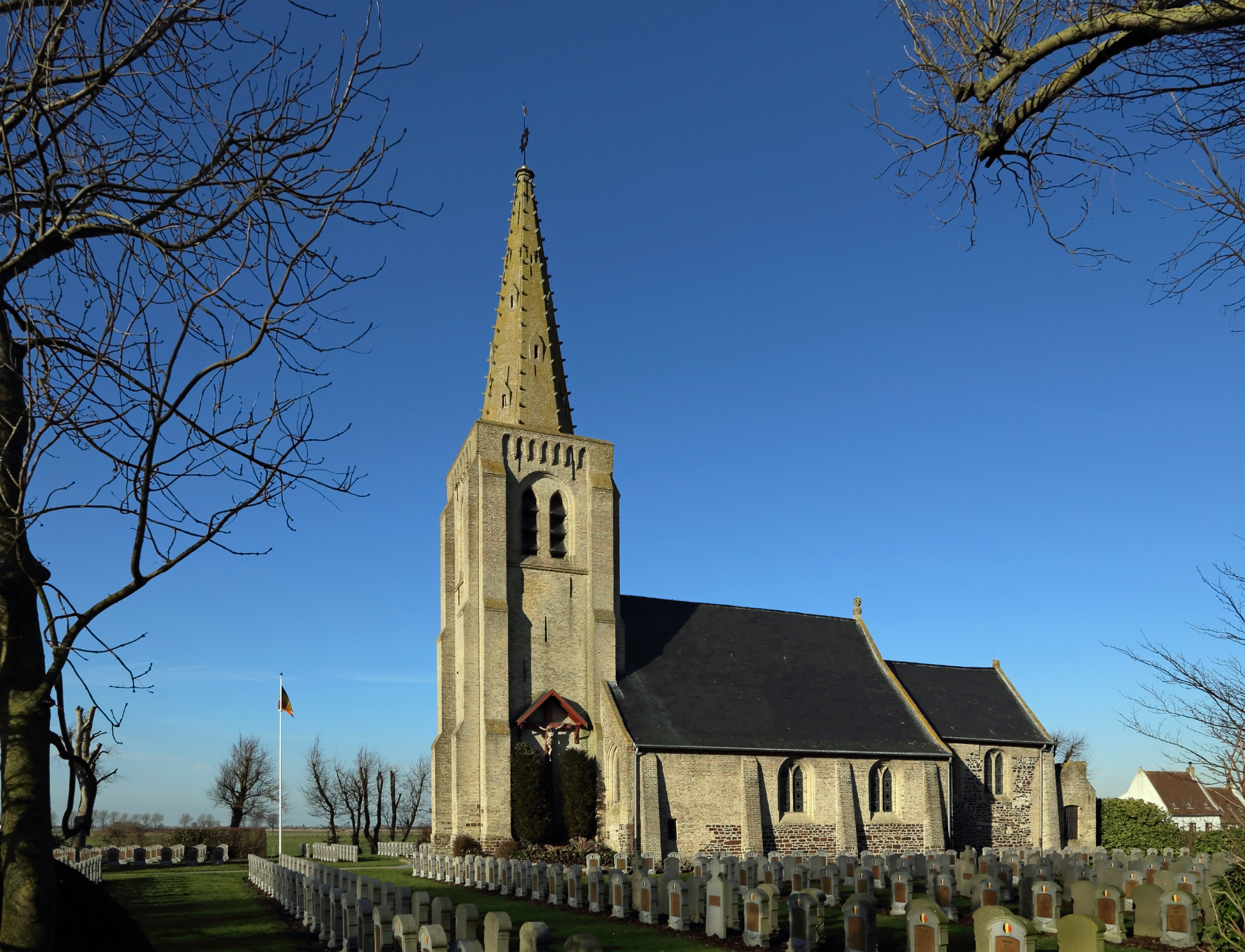
The church of Oeren

Oeren is a village in the Belgian province of West Flanders and is a submunicipality of Alveringem. It was an independent municipality until 1970. Oeren is located within the Westhoek region along the Lovaart channel. It is 289 ha and has 72 inhabitants (in 1971). The agricultural village has no real village centre, but consists of the former parish church and several scattered farms.

Oeren has a military cemetery where 642 Belgians from World War I are buried.

== History ==
Oeren was first mentioned in 1231 as "Horen" and later in 1298 as "Houren" and from 1313 as Oeren.

Oeren already had a fortified castle at an early date. In 1205 the castle, that was the residence of Johan Knibbe and Omer Knibbe, was burned down by the Isegrins. Oeren remained in the hands of successive families of Knibbe until the 16th century. From that moment until the establishment of the municipalities, Oeren belonged to the castellany of Veurne.
