= Pollinkhove =

Village in Belgium

Coordinates: 50°58′N 2°44′E

Pollinkhove is a village in Lo-Reninge, in the Belgian province of West Flanders.

== Geography ==
Pollinkhove is situated near the confluence of the Lovaart and Yser rivers. This strategic location has historically made it an important area for water management and transport, with the village's geography closely linked to the water systems, particularly the windlass system at Fintele, which connected the Lovaart and Yser rivers. This system, which dates back to the 13th century, facilitated the movement of boats across the dam between the two rivers. The continued significance of the region's waterways is also reflected in the 1827 construction of the lock complex at Fintele, which helped regulate river traffic. The centre of Pollinkhove borders the Izenberge Plateau and is bound by the Lo Canal and the Yser River.

== Demographics ==
As of 2024, Pollinkhove had an estimated population of 639 residents, spread across an area of 13.98 square kilometers. This gives the village a population density of approximately 45.71 people per square kilometer. Over the preceding years, the village experienced a slight population decline, with an annual change of -1.0% from 2021 to 2024.

== History ==
The oldest record of Pollinkhove is from 1112, referring to the "Lords of Pollinc" who lived in a homestead with the same name. Later, the Count of Flanders named them liege lords and they received the right to lift tolls and taxes which made them rich and gave them prestige.

Adrian van Pollinckhove apparently had the parish church built around 1500. This church and parish were named after Saint Bartholomew and located near the crossing of the Vaarstraat and the Pollinkhovestraat.

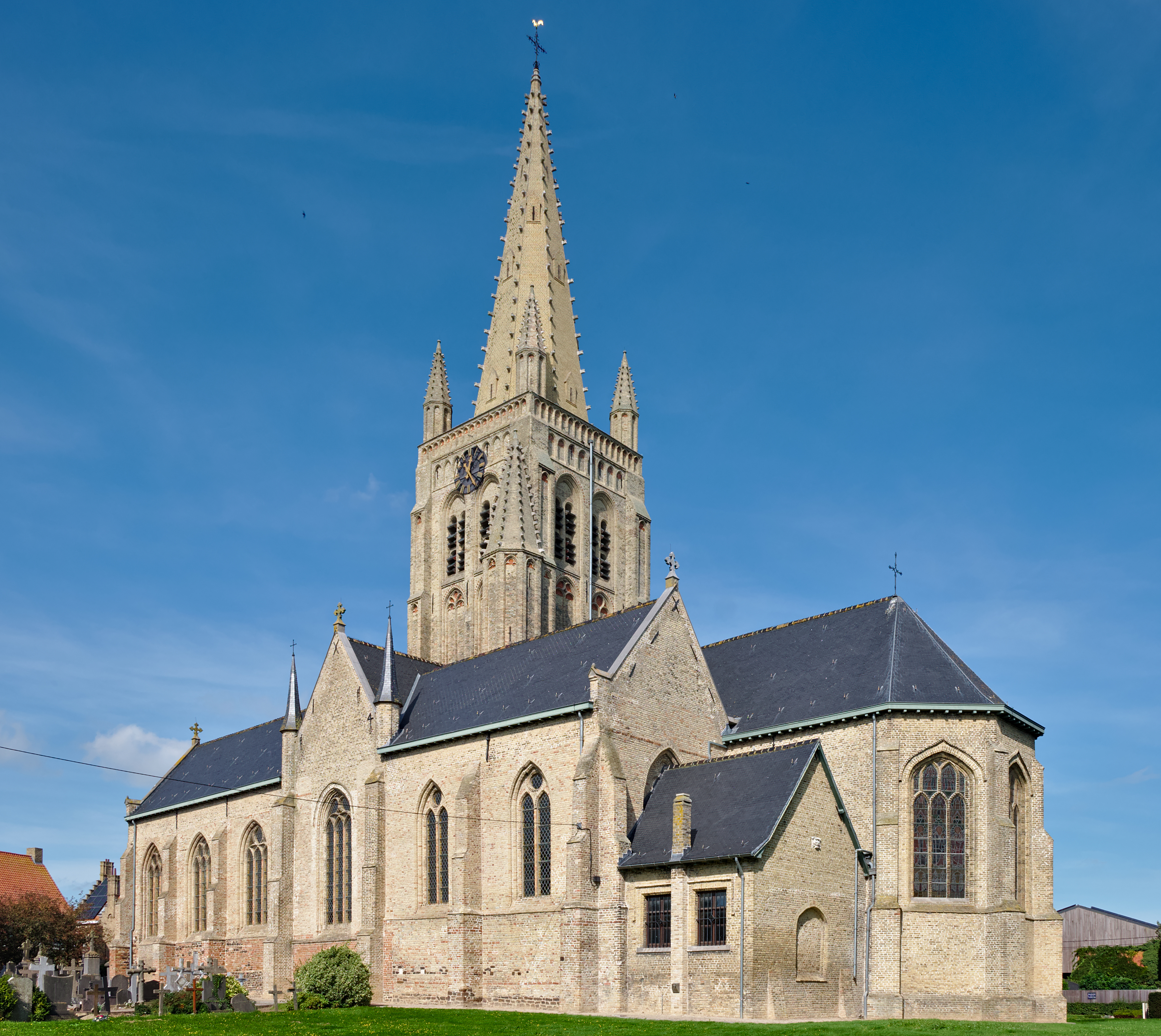
Saint Bartholomew's Church

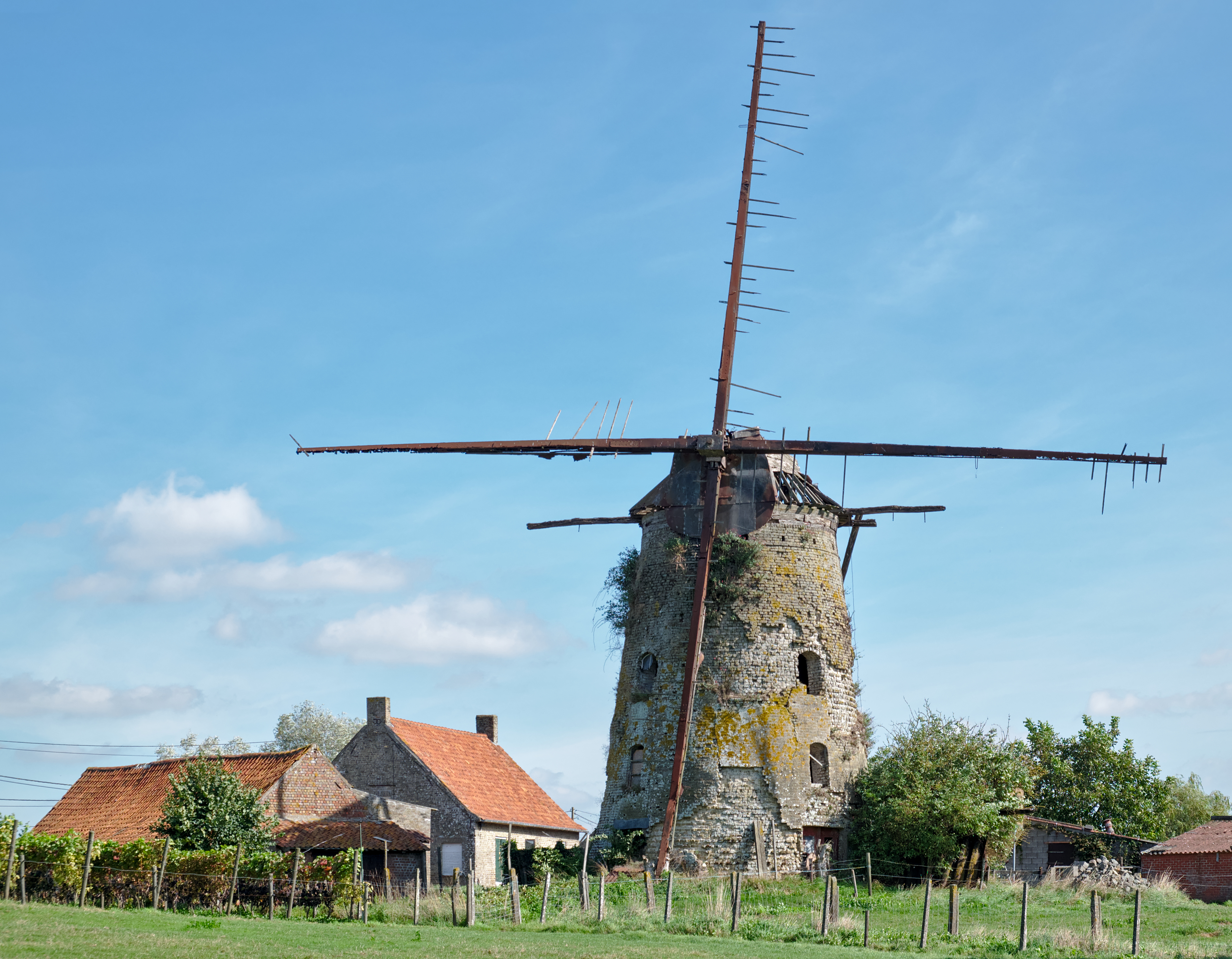
Margriet windmill
