= Leisele =

- Coordinates: 50°59′5″N 2°37′20″E
- Country: Belgium
- Province: West Flanders
- Municipality: Alveringem

Area
  - Total: 15.38 km^{2} (5.94 sq mi)

Population (1999-01-01)
  - Total: 774
  - Density: 50.3/km^{2} (130/sq mi)
- Source: NIS
- Postal code: 8691

Leisele is a small Belgian town in Alveringem near the French border with about 750 inhabitants.

== Gallery ==
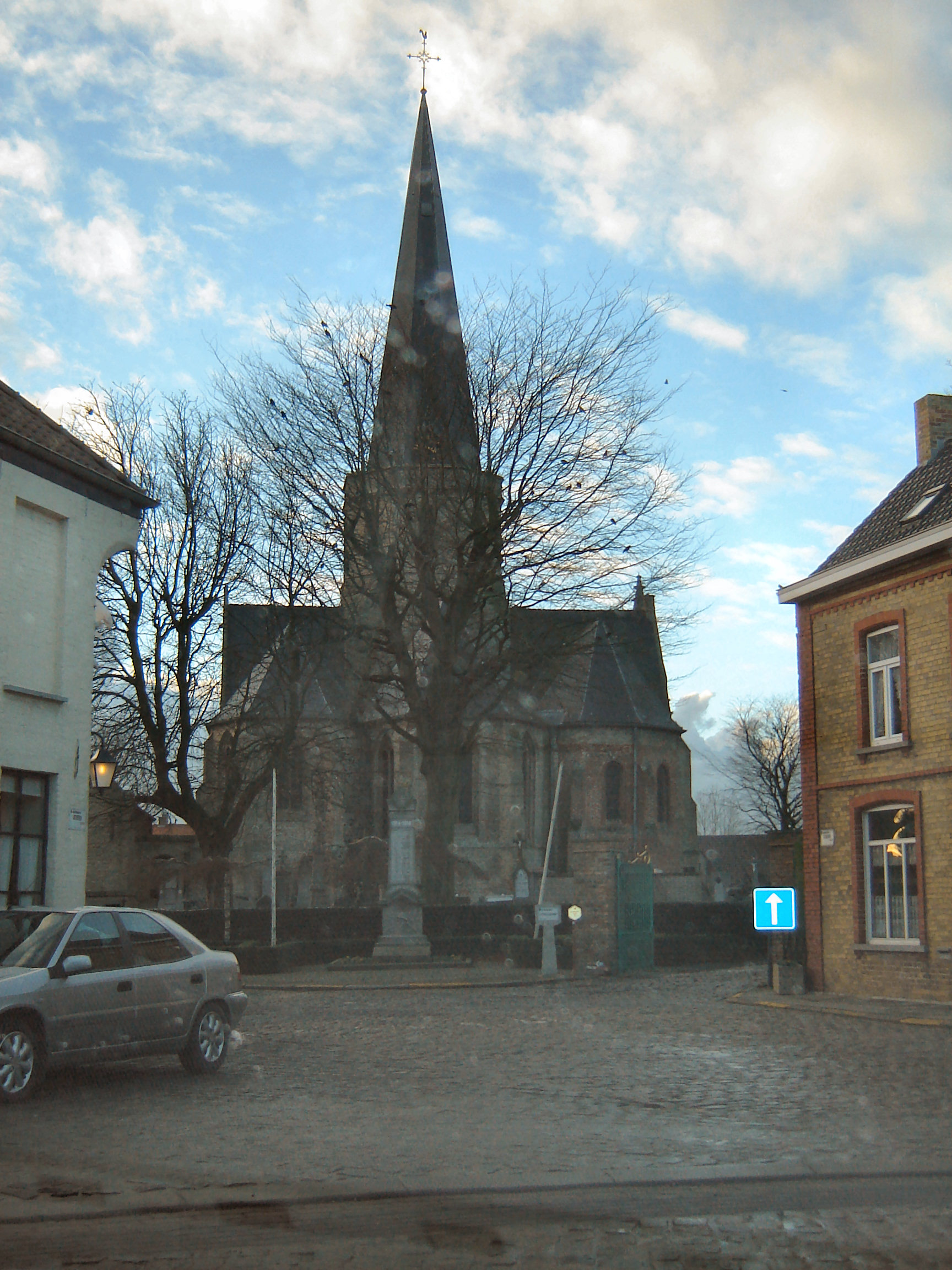
Saint Martinus Church, as seen from main road

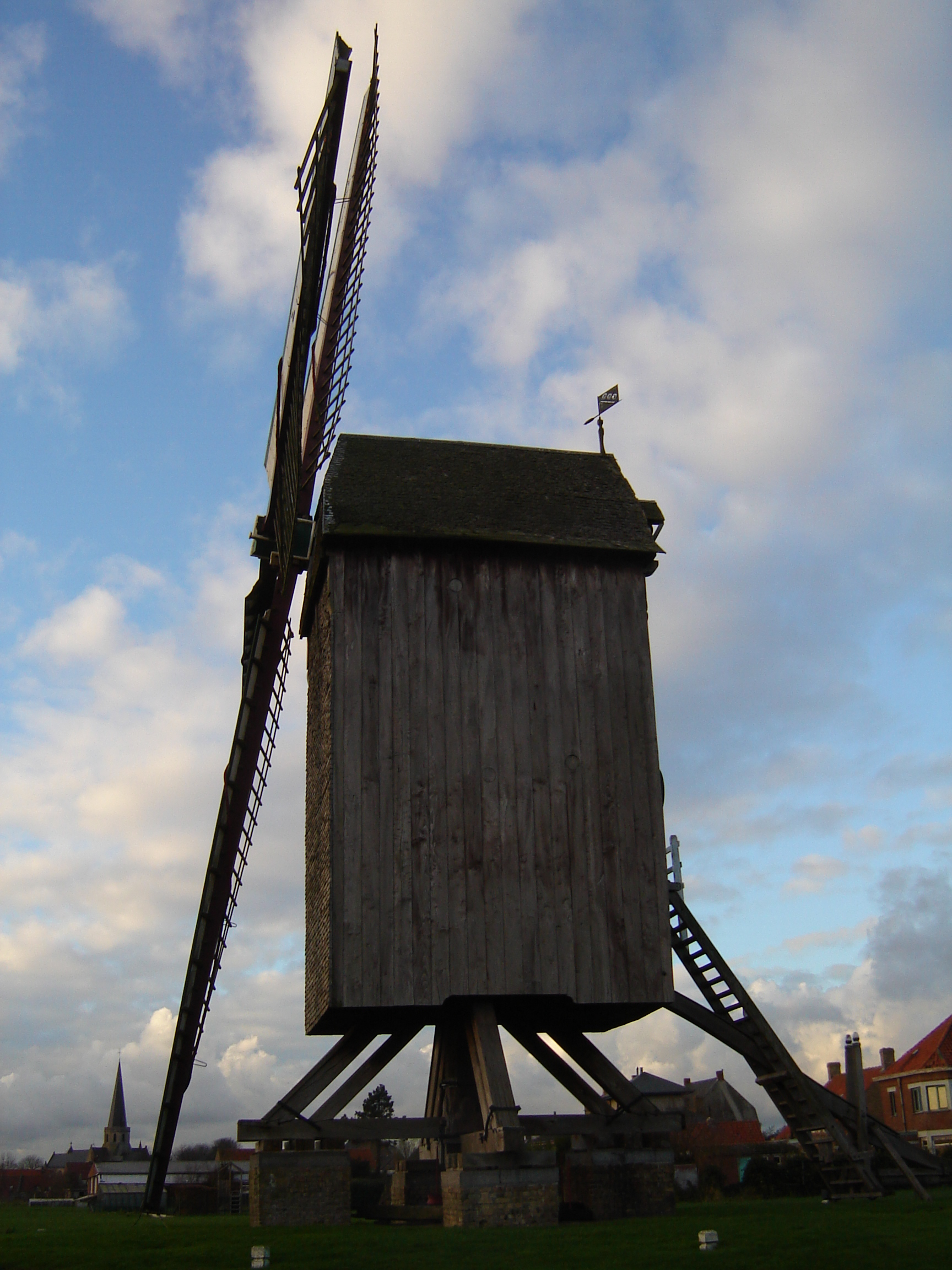
Stalijzermolen windmill

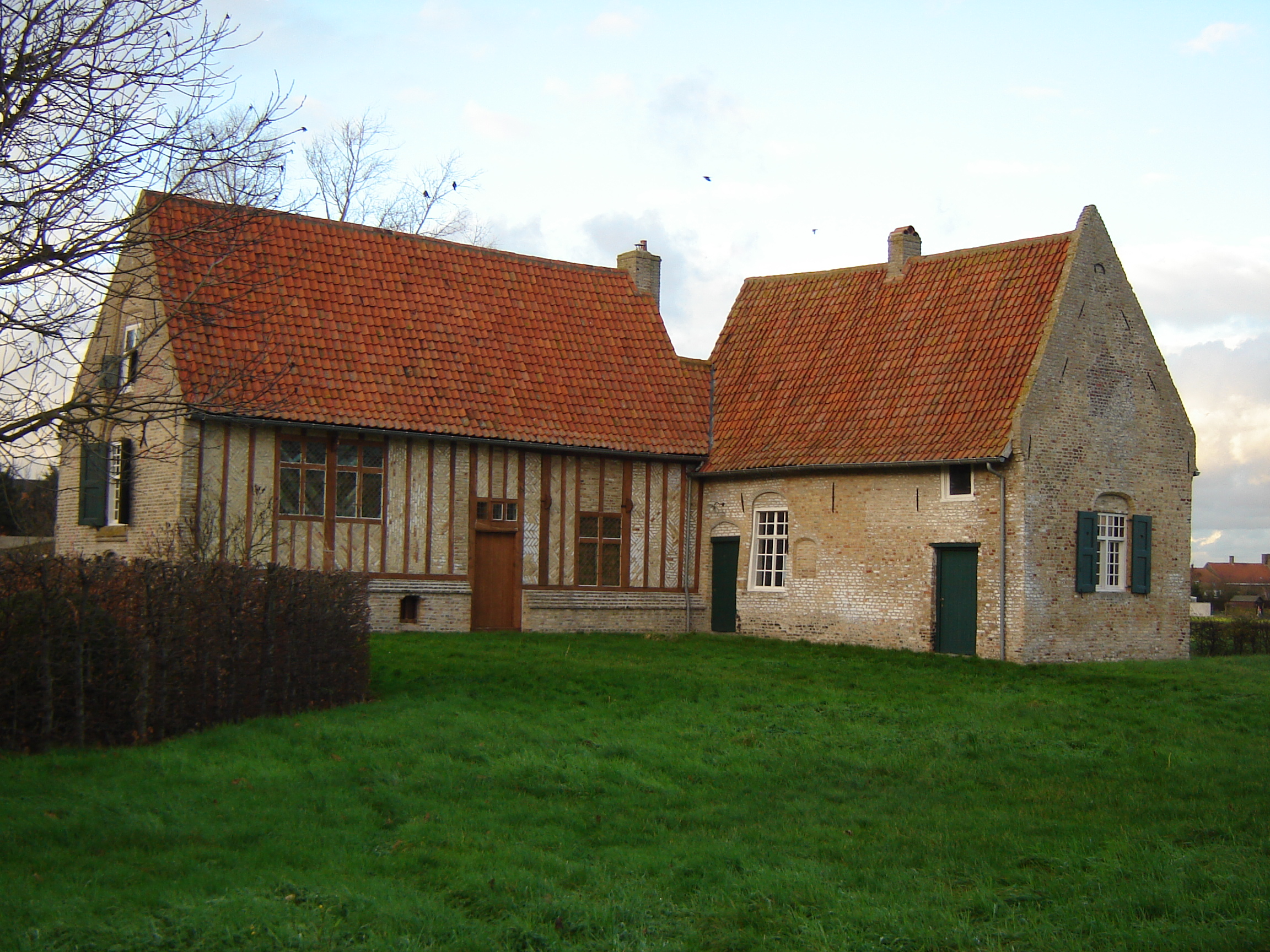
Inghels farm
