= Sint-Joris, Beernem =

Coordinates: 51.1276°N 3.37044°E

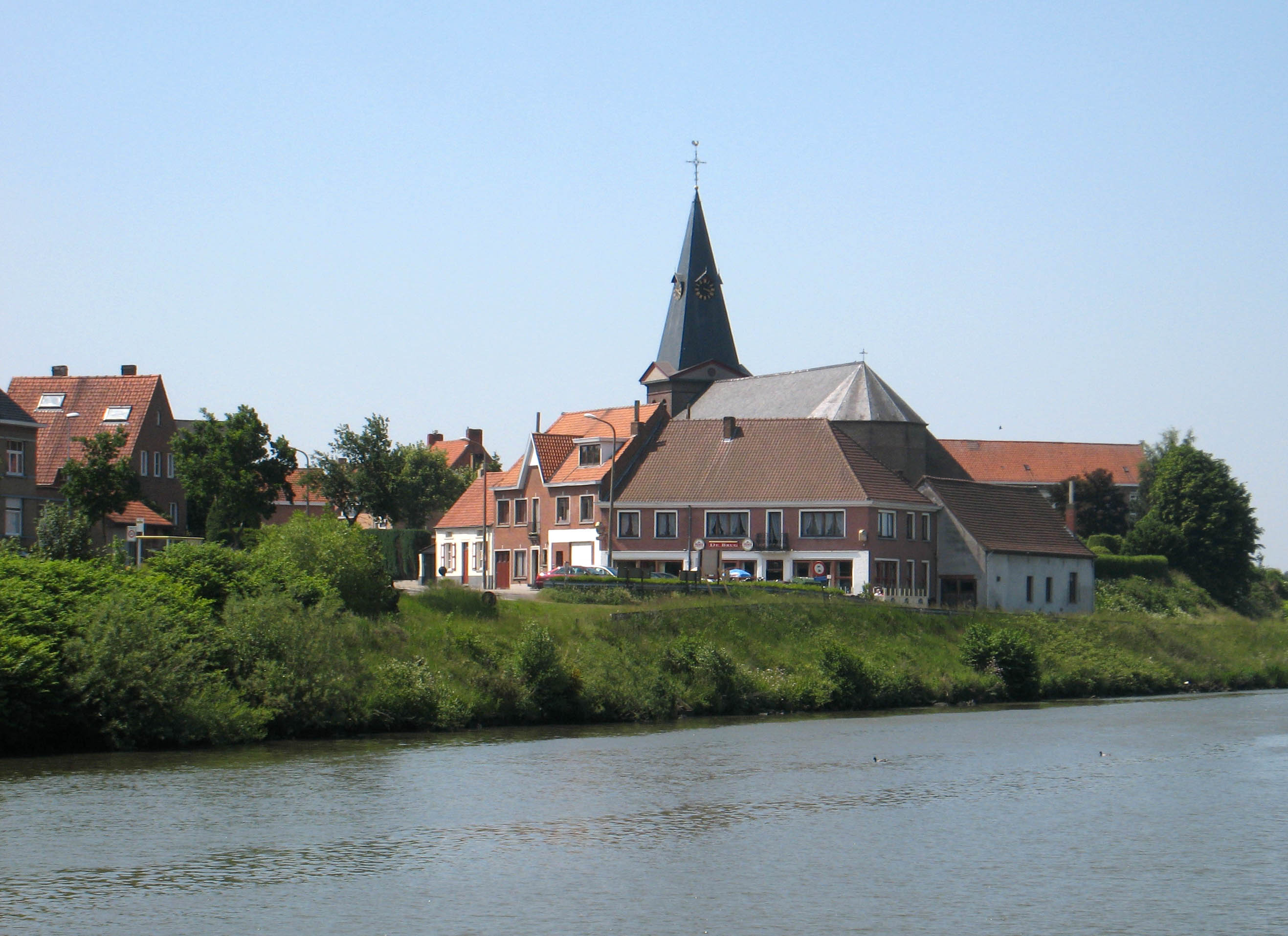
Sint-Joris, across the Ghent-Bruges Canal

Sint-Joris is a village in the municipality of Beernem, in the province of West Flanders, Belgium. It was an independent municipality until 1977. It covers an area of 645 ha (1,590 acres) and had 1785 inhabitants in 2007.

There is said to have been a chapel dedicated to Sint-Joris (Saint George) as early as the 10th-11th century.
