= Izenberge =

Section of Alveringem, Belgium

Coordinates: 50°59′37″N 2°39′18″E

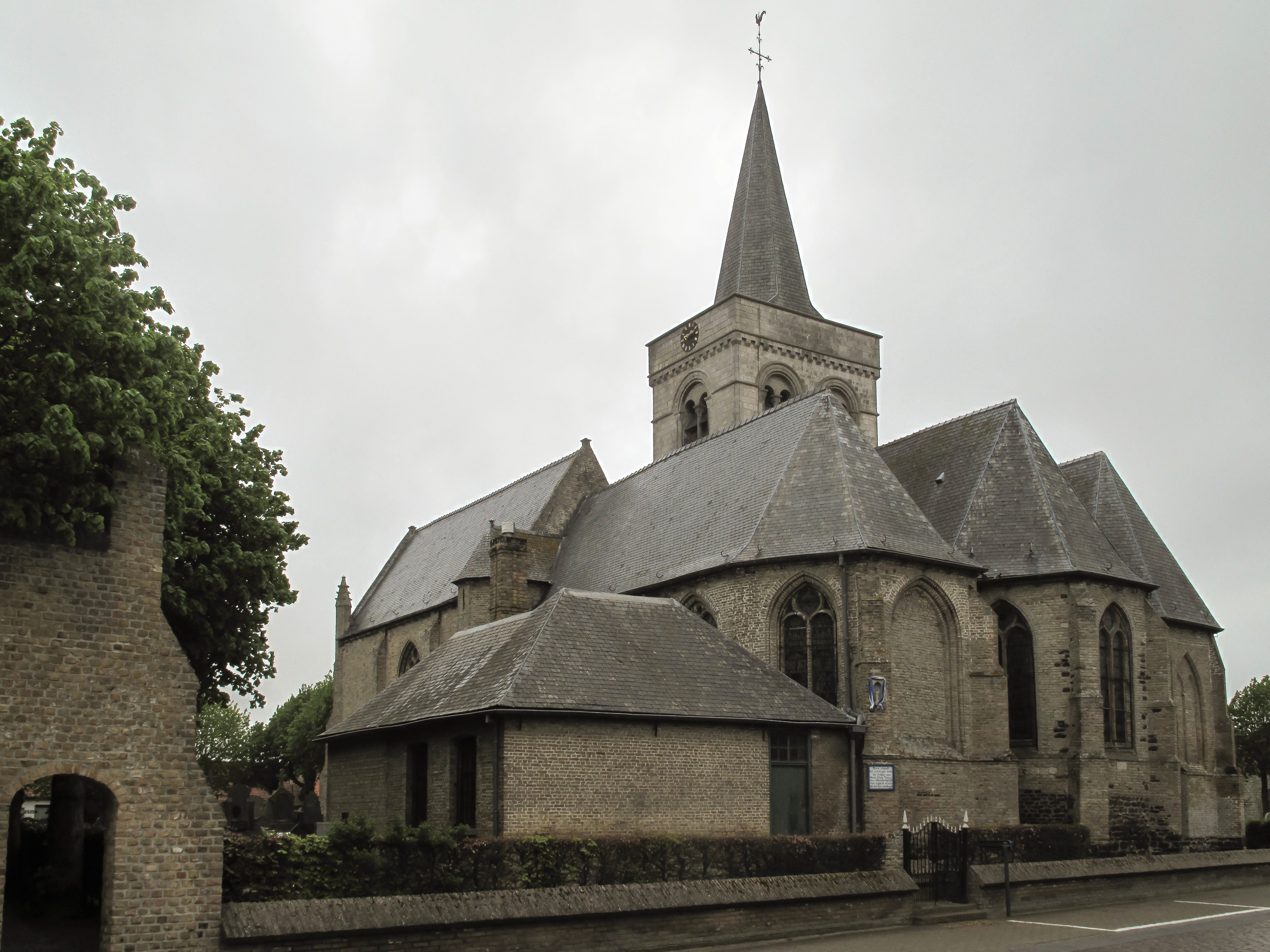
Izenberge, de Sint Meldredakerk

Izenberge is a Belgian village in the province of West Flanders. Since a fusion in the seventies it belongs now to the larger agglomeration of Alveringem. It's the home of the open-air museum Bachten De Kupe and a local museum of curiosities. Besides a picturesque Romanesque church, it also has a very beautiful baroque chapel, which is still a place of pilgrimage.

Events: in August there is the annual funfair with a flea market (15 August).
