= Houtem =

- Village
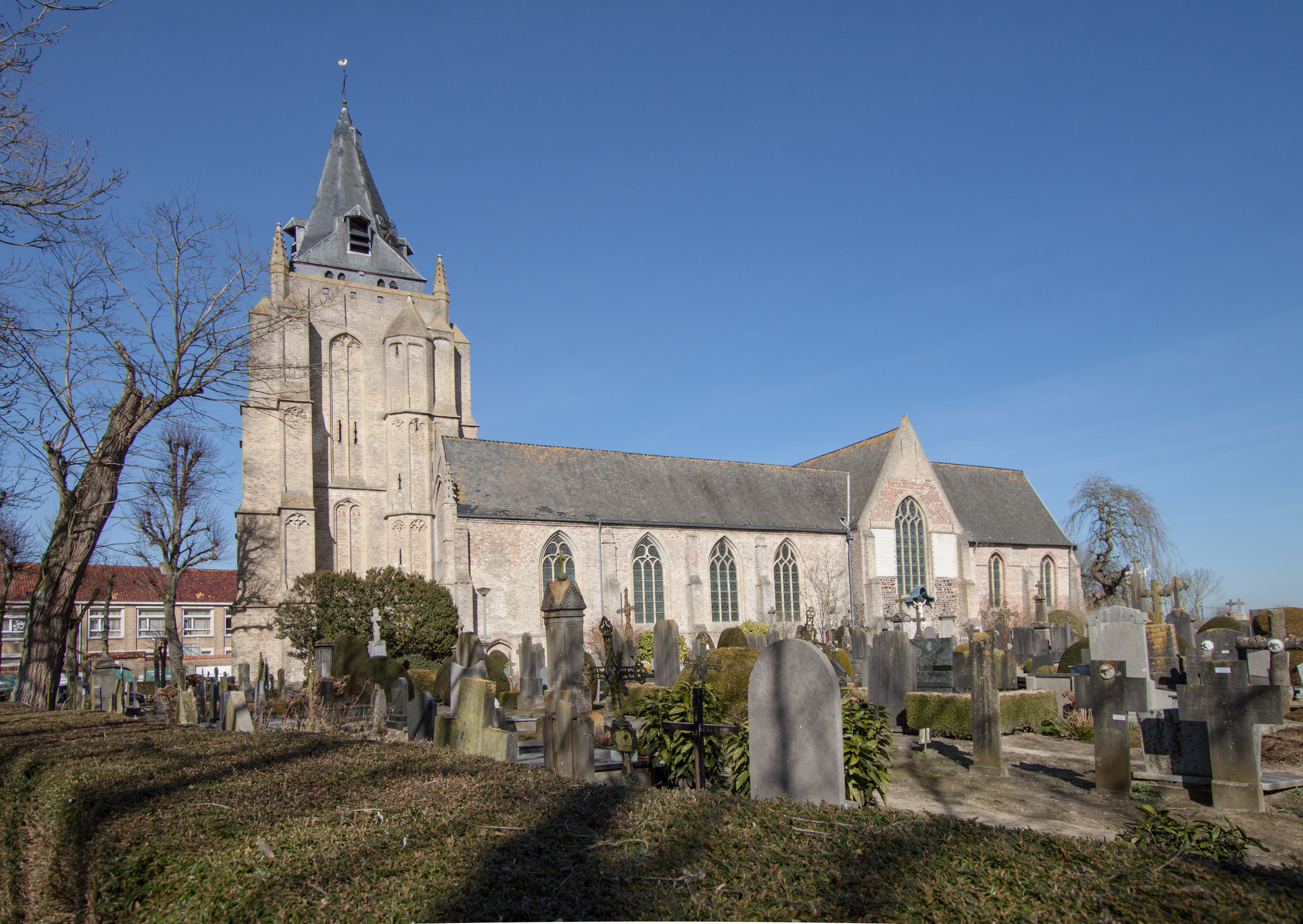
- Assumption of Mary Churchyard

- Location in Belgium
- Coordinates: 51.0092°N 2.6083°E
- Country: Belgium
- Region: Flemish Region
- Province: West Flanders
- Municipality: Veurne

Area
  - Total: 27.41 km^{2} (10.58 sq mi)

Population (1999)
  - Total: 688
  - Density: 25.1/km^{2} (65.0/sq mi)
- Time zone: CET

Houtem is a village in the municipality of Veurne in the Belgian province of West Flanders. The village is located near the French border. Until 1977, Houtem was an independent municipality. During World War I, it was home to the Headquarters of the Belgian Army.

== Overview ==
Houtem was first mentioned in 1187 als Houthem. In 1588, the village was almost completely destroyed by the French army.

The vicarage of the village dates from 1636, and was part of the Sint-Niklaas monastery of Veurne. On 23 January 1915, the vicarage was transformed into the Great Headquarters of the Belgian Army. Albert I of Belgium became a frequent visitor of the village. On 5 January 1917, Félix Wielemans, the Chief of Staff, died in Houtem after having contracted pneumonia from the trenches. He was buried in the cemetery of Houtem.

In 1917, a civilian hospital was built in Houtem with the aid of the American Red Cross. After the war, it was used as a sanatorium and closed in 1926.

In 1977, the municipality was merged into Veurne. In 2007, Houtem was elected as one of the 50 nominees for most beautiful village of Flanders.

A 243 metres high radio tower is located near Houtem. The tower was used by NATO for communication. In 2014, the tower was sold to Jump Trading for €5 million, because it was the shortest and fastest data route between London and Frankfurt.
