= List of windmills in the Netherlands =

Windmills are known worldwide as an iconic symbol of Dutch culture. Some 1,200 historic windmills survive, most of which are gristmills or polder mills. Many remain fully functional, and their upkeep and operation is promoted by a number of civic organizations, including De Hollandsche Molen, Gilde van Vrijwillige Molenaars and Stichting De Fryske Mole. Several Dutch villages are known for their concentration of windmills, including Kinderdijk, Zaanse Schans, and Schiedam, home to the tallest windmill in the world. Tjaskers, a kind of windmill native to Friesland, were also used for water management.

This list of windmills in the Netherlands is grouped by province. Types of Dutch windmills include:

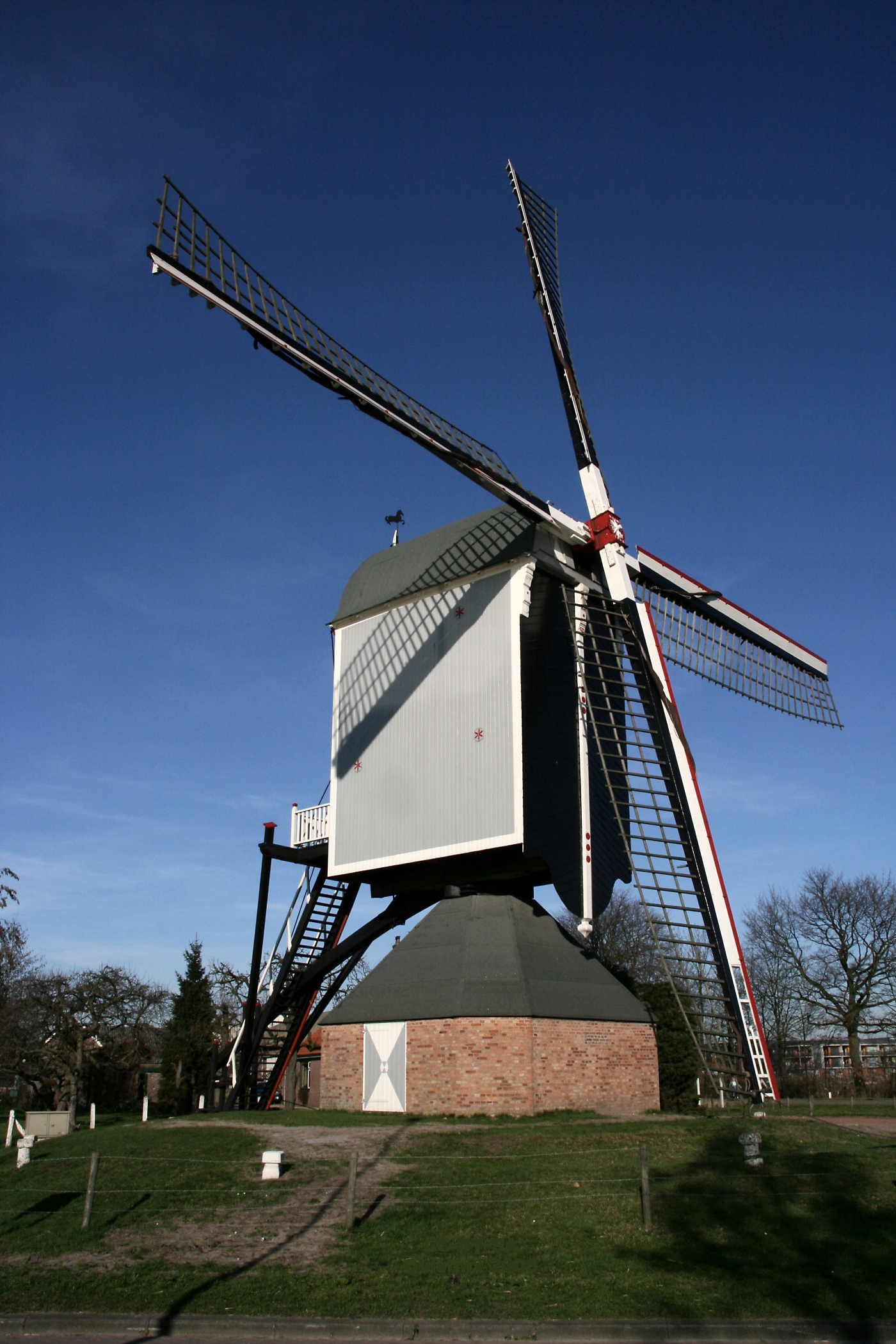
Standerdmolen (post mill)

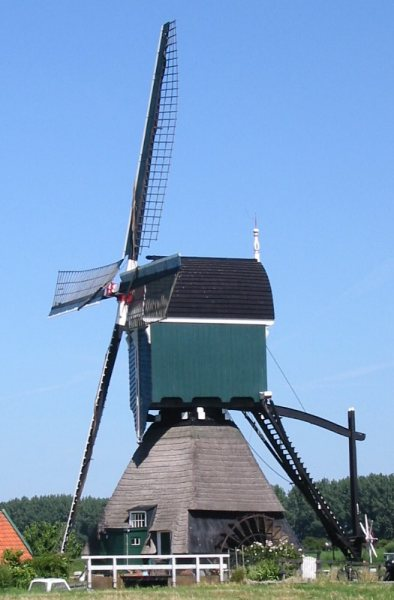
Wipmolen

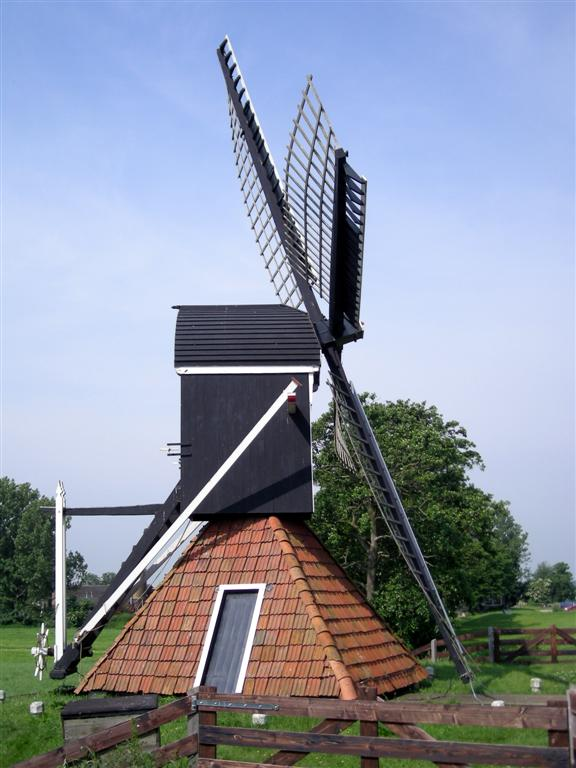
Spinnenkopmolen ("Spider's head")

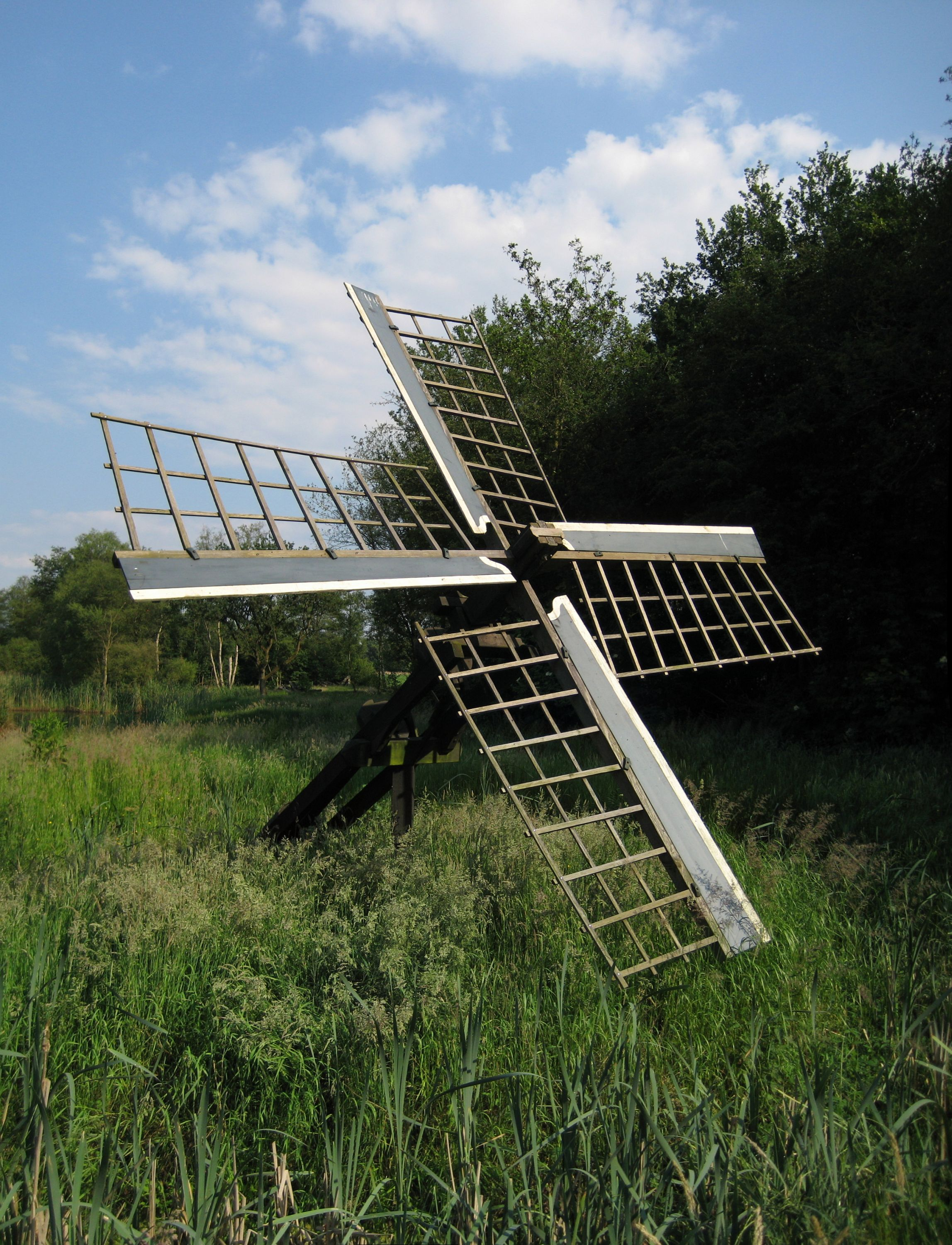
Tjasker

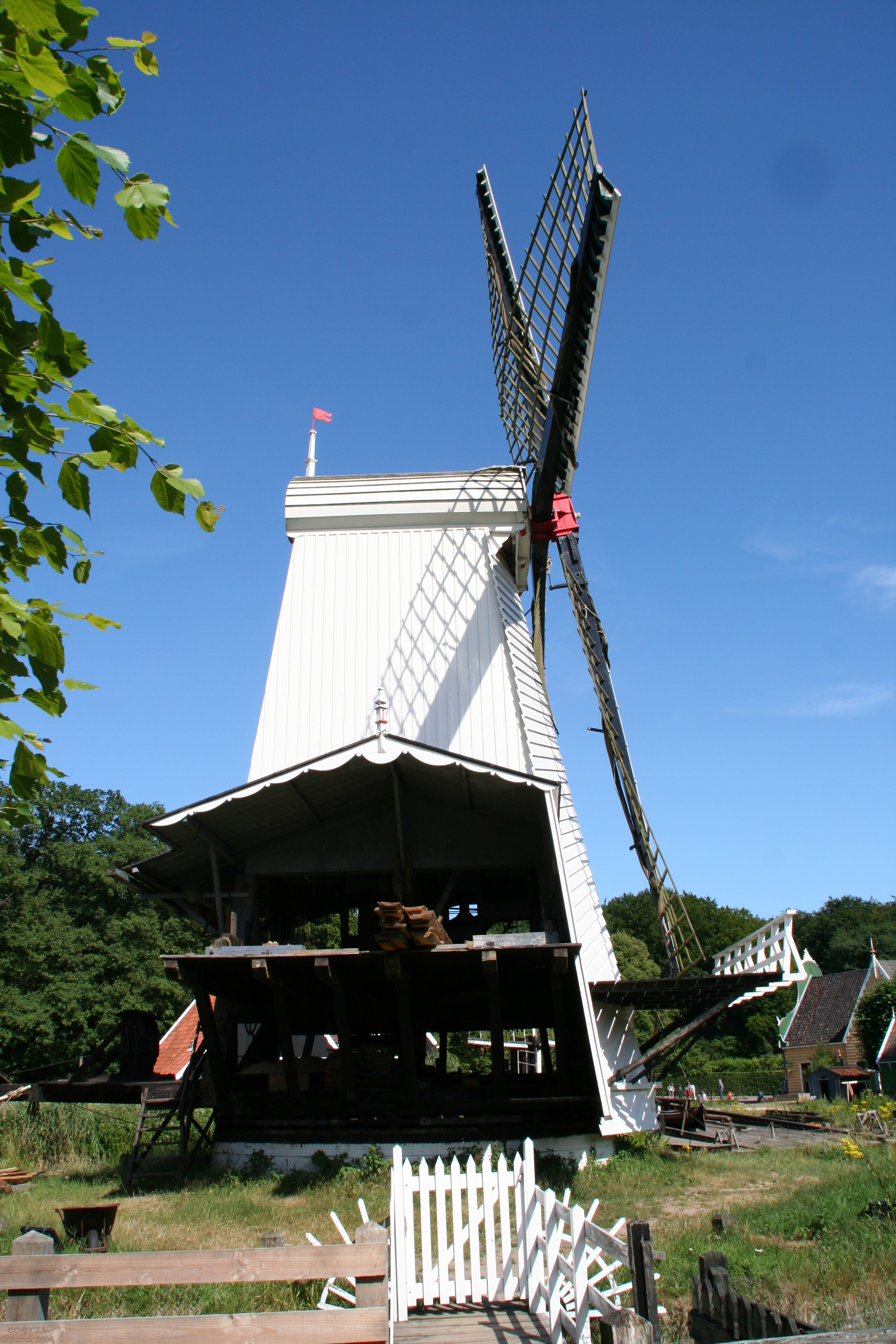
Paltrokmolen

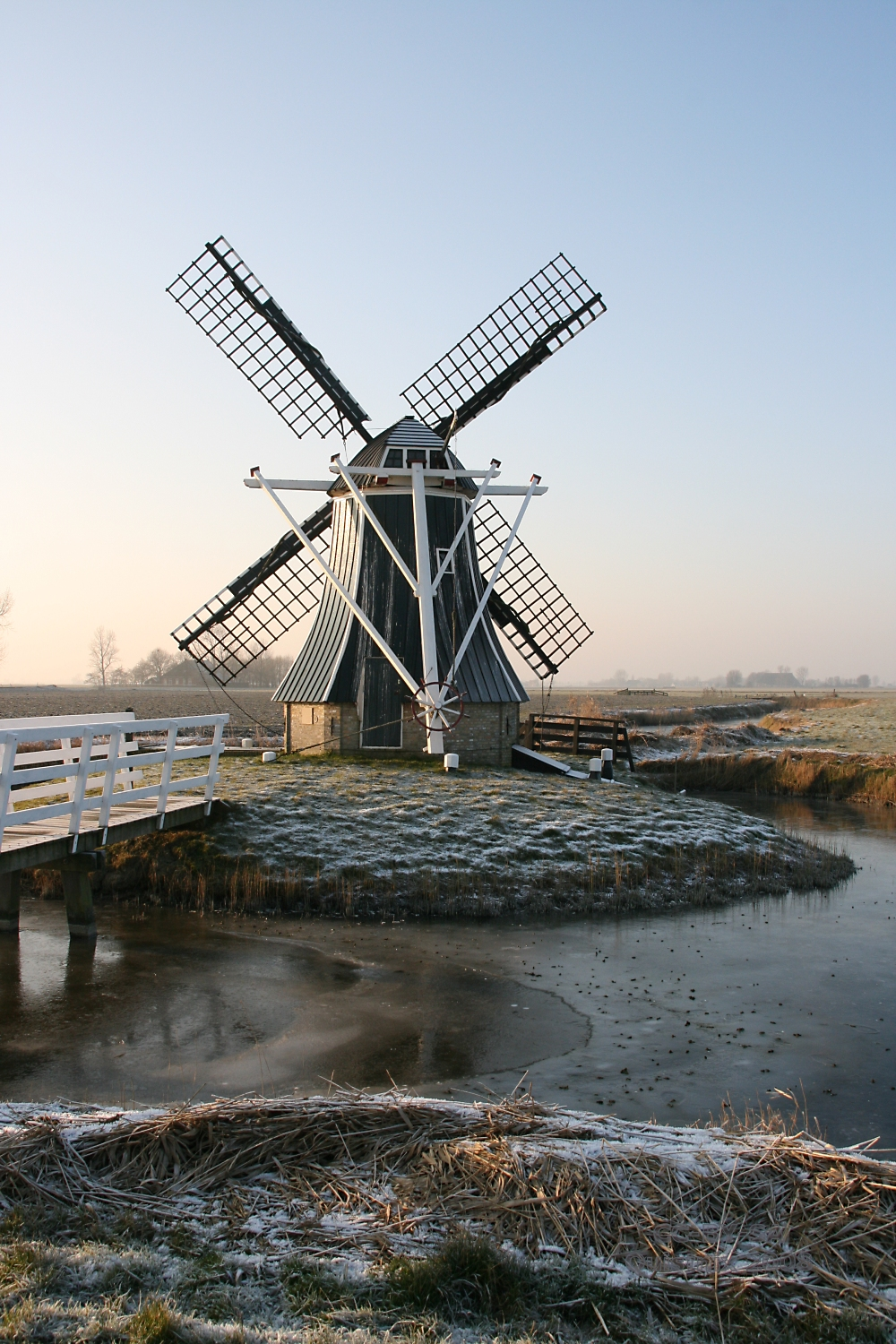
Grondzeiler

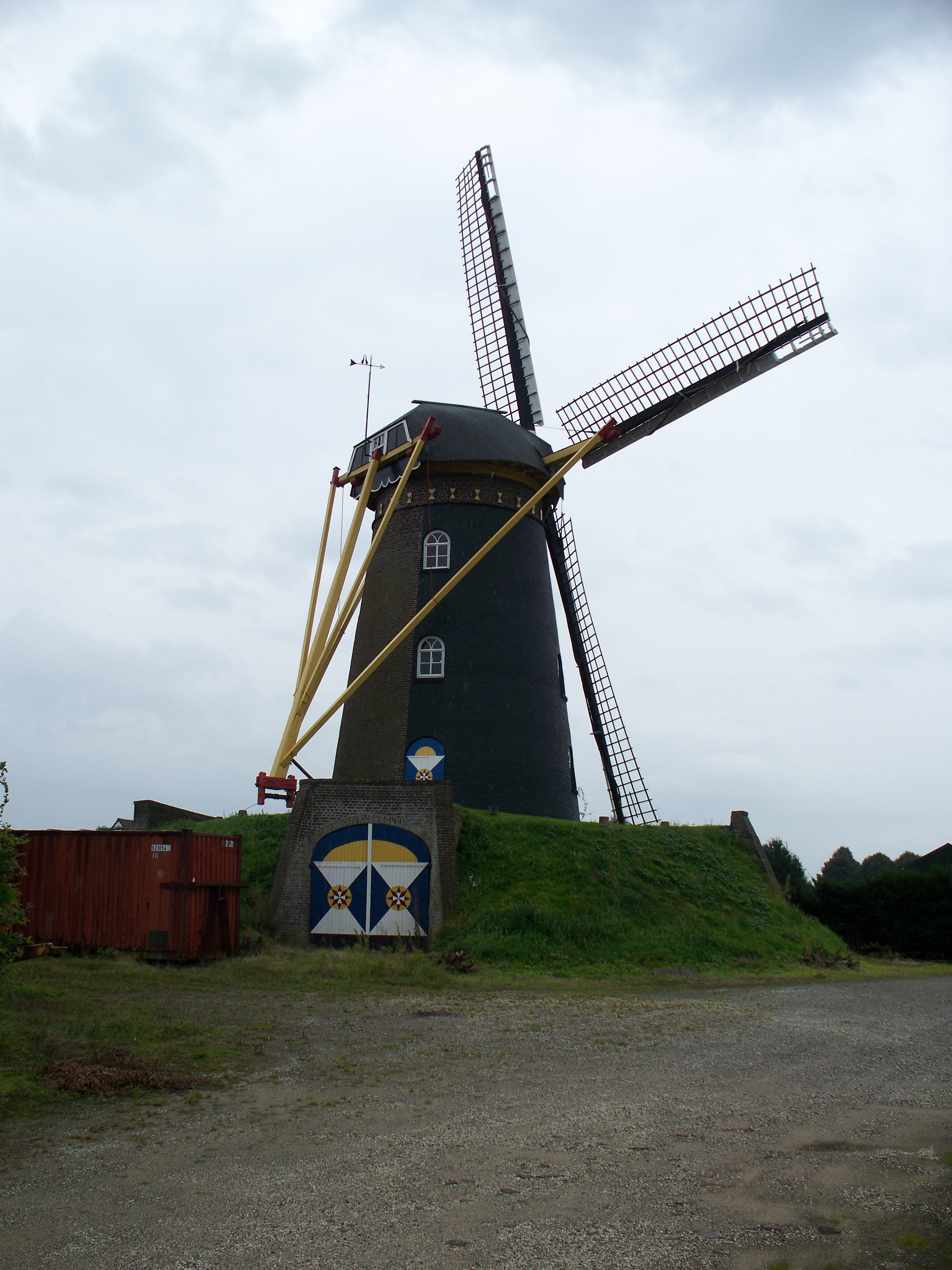
Beltmolen

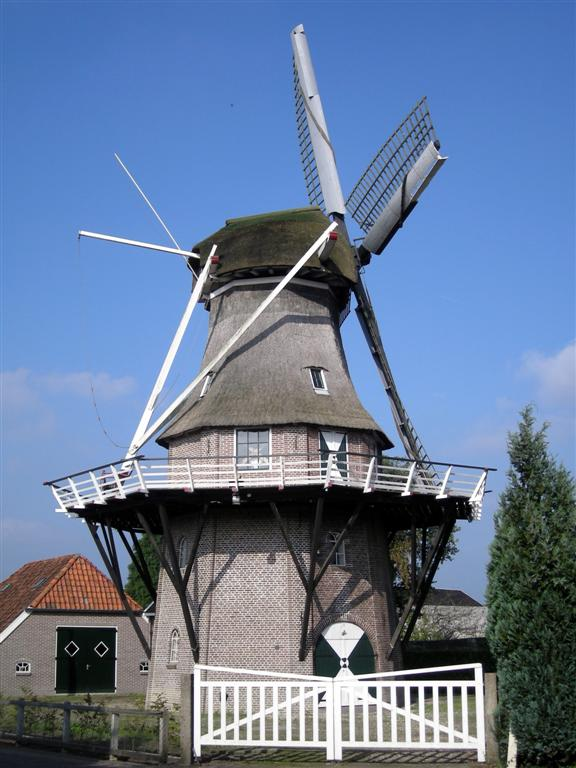
Stellingmolen

== Lists of Dutch windmills by province ==

- List of windmills in Drenthe
- List of windmills in Flevoland
- List of windmills in Friesland
- List of windmills in Gelderland
- List of windmills in Groningen
- List of windmills in Limburg
- List of windmills in North Brabant
- List of windmills in North Holland
- List of windmills in Overijssel
- List of windmills in South Holland
- List of windmills in Utrecht
- List of windmills in Zeeland
