= Nooitgedacht =

Nooitgedacht (English: have never thought) is the name of several places:

- Nooitgedacht, Drenthe, a hamlet in the Netherlands.
- Nooitgedacht, Groningen, a hamlet in the Netherlands
- Nooitgedacht, South Africa
- Nooit Gedacht, Sri Lanka, a colonial establishment in Unawatuna, Sri Lanka
- Nooitgedacht Glacial Pavements, the geological site with rock engravings between Kimberley and Barkly West, South Africa.

It is also the name of a number of windmills:

- Nooit Gedacht, Afferden, a windmill in Limburg, Netherlands
- Nooit Gedacht, Arnemuiden, a windmill in Zeeland, Netherlands
- Nooit Gedacht, Budel, a windmill in North Brabant, Netherlands
- Nooit Gedacht, Cadzand, a windmill in Zeeland, Netherlands
- Nooit Gedacht, Colijnsplaat, a windmill in Zeeland, Netherlands
- Nooit Gedacht, Eindewege, a windmill in Zeeland, Netherlands
- Nooit Gedacht, Mechelen-aan-de-Maas, a windmill in Limburg, Belgium
- Nooit Gedacht, Merselo, a windmill in Limburg, Netherlands
- Nooitgedacht, Spijkenisse, a windmill in South Holland, Netherlands
- Nooitgedacht, Veenoord, a windmill in Drenthe, the Netherlands
- Nooit Gedacht, Woudrichem, a windmill in North Brabant, Netherlands

Other

- Nooitgedacht pony, a South African pony breed
