= De Korenbloem =

De Korenbloem (English: The Cornflower) is a name given to some windmills in Belgium and the Netherlands.

- De Korenbloem, Culemborg, a windmill in Gelderland
- De Korenbloem, Goes, a windmill in Zeeland
- De Korenbloem, Haaksbergen, a windmill in Overijssel
- De Korenbloem, Loil, a windmill in Gelderland
- De Korenbloem, Mill, a windmill in North Brabant
- De Korenbloem, Oploo, a windmill in North Brabant
- De Korenbloem, Ospel, a windmill in Limburg, Netherlands
- De Korenbloem, Oude-Tonge, a windmill in South Holland
- De Korenbloem, Scherpenisse, a windmill in Zeeland
- De Korenbloem, Sommelsdijk, a windmill in South Holland
- De Korenbloem, Ulvenhout, a windmill in North Brabant
- De Korenbloem, Vriescheloo, a windmill in Groningen
- De Korenbloem, Zoelen, a windmill in Gelderland
- De Korenbloem, Zonnemaire, a windmill in Zeeland
- De Drie Korenblomen, Schiedam, a windmill in South Holland
- Korenbloem, Ophoven, a windmill in Limburg, Belgium
