= List of windmills in Limburg =

List of windmills in Limburg may refer to:

- List of windmills in Limburg (Belgium)
- List of windmills in Limburg (Netherlands)
