= List of windmills in Zeeland =

List of Dutch windmills

A list of windmills in the Dutch province of Zeeland.

Location	Name of mill	Type	Built	Notes	Photograph
Aagtekerke	Aagtekerke Windmill	Grondzeiler	1801	Molendatabase (in Dutch)	
Arnemuiden	Nooit Gedacht	Grondzeiler	1981	Molendatabase (in Dutch)	
Axel	Stadsmolen	Stellingmolen	1750	Molendatabase (in Dutch)	
Biervliet	De Harmonie	Beltmolen	1842	Molendatabase (in Dutch)	
Biggekerke	Brassersmolen	Grondzeiler	1712	Molendatabase (in Dutch)	
Borssele	De Hoop & Verwachting	Grondzeiler	1714	Molendatabase (in Dutch)	
Brouwershaven	De Haan	Grondzeiler	1724	Molendatabase (in Dutch)	
Brouwershaven	Windlust	Kleine Molen	1935	Molendatabase (in Dutch)	
Burgh-Haamstede	De Graanhalm	Stellingmolen	1847	Molendatabase (in Dutch)	
Cadzand	Nooit Gedacht	Beltmolen	1898	Molendatabase (in Dutch)	
Colijnsplaat	De Oude Molen	Grondzeiler	c1727	Molendatabase (in Dutch)	
Colijnsplaat	Nooit Gedacht; Nieuwe Molen	Stellingmolen	1864	Molendatabase (in Dutch)	
Domburg	Welteevreden	Grondzeiler	1817	Molendatabase (in Dutch)	
Dreischor	Aeolus	Grondzeiler	1739	Molendatabase (in Dutch)	
Eindewege	Nooit Gedacht	Stellingmolen	1872	Molendatabase (in Dutch)	
Elkerzee-Scharendijke	De Lelie	Grondzeiler	1868	Molendatabase (in Dutch)	
Ellemeet	't Hert; Oostermolen	Grondzeiler	1748	Molendatabase (in Dutch)	
Gapinge	De Graanhalm	Stellingmolen	1896	Molendatabase (in Dutch)	
Goes	De Korenbloem	Stellingmolen	1801	Molendatabase (in Dutch)	
Grijpskerke	't Welvaaren van Grijpskerke	Grondzeiler	1801	Molendatabase (in Dutch)	
Heinkenszand	De Vijf Gebroeders	Stellingmolen	1851	Molendatabase (in Dutch)	
Hoedekenskerke	De Koutermolen	Grondzeiler	1874	Molendatabase (in Dutch)	
Hoek	Windlust	Stellingmolen	1857	Molendatabase (in Dutch)	
Hulst	De Stadmolen	Stellingmolen	1792	Molendatabase (in Dutch)	
IJzendijke	IJzendijke Windmill	Stellingmolen	1841	Molendatabase (in Dutch)	
Kerkwerve-Moriaanshoofd	De Zwaan	Grondzeiler	1886	Molendatabase (in Dutch)	
Kloetinge	Kloetinge Windmill	Stellingmolen	1704	Molendatabase (in Dutch)	
Kloosterzande	Kloosterzande Windmill	Standerdmolen	1781	Molendatabase (in Dutch)	
Koudekerke	De Lelie	Stellingmolen	1872	Molendatabase (in Dutch)	
Krabbendijke	De Rozeboom	Gronzeiler	1862	Molendatabase (in Dutch)	
Kruiningen	De Oude Molen	Grondzeiler	1801	Molendatabase (in Dutch)	
Kuitaart	Vogelzicht	Grondzeiler	1865	Molendatabase (in Dutch)	
Meliskerke	Meliskerke Windmill	Grondzeiler	1801	Molendatabase (in Dutch)	
Middelburg	De Hoop	Stellingmolen	1754	Molendatabase (in Dutch)	
Middelburg	De Koning	Stellingmolen	1882	Molendatabase (in Dutch)	
Middelburg	De Seismolen	Stellingmolen	1728	Molendatabase (in Dutch)	
Middelburg	Ons Genoegen	Stellingmolen	1847	Molendatabase (in Dutch)	
Nieuw- en Sint Joosland	Buiten Verwachting	Grondzeiler	1874	Molendatabase (in Dutch)	
Nieuwerkerk	Nieuwerkerk Windmill	Grondzeiler	1844	Molendatabase (in Dutch)	
Nieuwvliet	Nieuwvliet Windmill	Grondzeiler	1850	Molendatabase (in Dutch)	
Nisse	De Poel	Grondzeiler	1752	Molendatabase (in Dutch)	
Oost-Souburg	De Pere	Stellingmolen	1752	Molendatabase (in Dutch)	
Oosterland	Oosterland Windmill	Grondzeiler	1752	Molendatabase (in Dutch)	
Oostkapelle	D'Arke	Stellingmolen	1858	Molendatabase (in Dutch)	
Oud-Vossemeer	De Jager	Stellingmolen	1850	Molendatabase (in Dutch)	
Ovezande	Ovezande Windmill	Beltmolen	1884	Molendatabase (in Dutch)	
Poortvliet	De Korenaar	Stellingmolen	1710	Molendatabase (in Dutch)	
Retranchement	Retranchement Windmill	Standerdmolen	1818	Molendatabase (in Dutch)	
Rilland-Bath	De Witte Molen	Stellingmolen	1851	Molendatabase (in Dutch)	
Scherpenisse	De Korenbloem	Stellingmolen	1872	Molendatabase (in Dutch)	
Schoondijke	Hulsters Molen	1884	Beltmolen	Molendatabase (in Dutch)	
Serooskerke	De Jonge Johannes	Beltmolen	1835	Molendatabase (in Dutch)	
's-Gravenpolder	De Korenhalm	Stellingmolen	1876	Molendatabase (in Dutch)	
Sint Annaland	Sint Annaland post mill	Standerdmolen	1684	Molendatabase (in Dutch)	
Sint Annaland	De Vier Winden	Stellingmolen	1847	Molendatabase (in Dutch)	
Sint Maartensdijk	De Nijverheid	Stellingmolen	1868	Molendatabase (in Dutch)	
Sint Philipsland	De Hoop	Grondzeiler	1724	Molendatabase (in Dutch)	
Sluis	De Brak	Stellingmolen	1739	Molendatabase (in Dutch)	
Spui	Eben Haezer	Beltmolen	1807	Molendatabase (in Dutch)	
Stavenisse	Stavenisse Windmill	Grondzeiler	1801	Molendatabase (in Dutch)	
Tholen	De Hoop	Stellingmolen	1736	Molendatabase (in Dutch)	
Veere	De Koe	Stellingmolen	1909	Molendatabase (in Dutch)	
Vlissingen	Oranjemolen	Stellingmolen	c1699	Molendatabase (in Dutch)	
Waarde	De Hoed	Standerdmolen	1858	Molendatabase (in Dutch)	
Wemeldinge	Aeolus	Stellingmolen	1869	Molendatabase (in Dutch)	
Wemeldinge	De Hoop	Stellingmolen	1866	Molendatabase (in Dutch)	
Westkapelle	De Noorman	Stellingmolen	1852	Molendatabase (in Dutch)	
Wissenkerke	De Onderneming	Stellingmolen	1860	Molendatabase (in Dutch)	
Wissenkerke	Landzigt	Grondzeiler	1869	Molendatabase (in Dutch)	
Wolphaartsdijk	De Hoop	Stellingmolen	1808	Molendatabase (in Dutch)	
Zierikzee	De Hoop	Stellingmolen	1850	Molendatabase (in Dutch)	
Zierikzee	Den Haas	Stellingmolen	1727	Molendatabase (in Dutch)	
Zonnemaire	De Korenbloem	Stellingmolen	1873	Molendatabase (in Dutch)	
Zoutelande	Zoutelande Windmill	Grondzeiler	1722	Molendatabase (in Dutch)	
Zuidzande	Zuidzande Windmill	Beltmolen	1874	Molendatabase (in Dutch)	
