= Rilland =

- Village
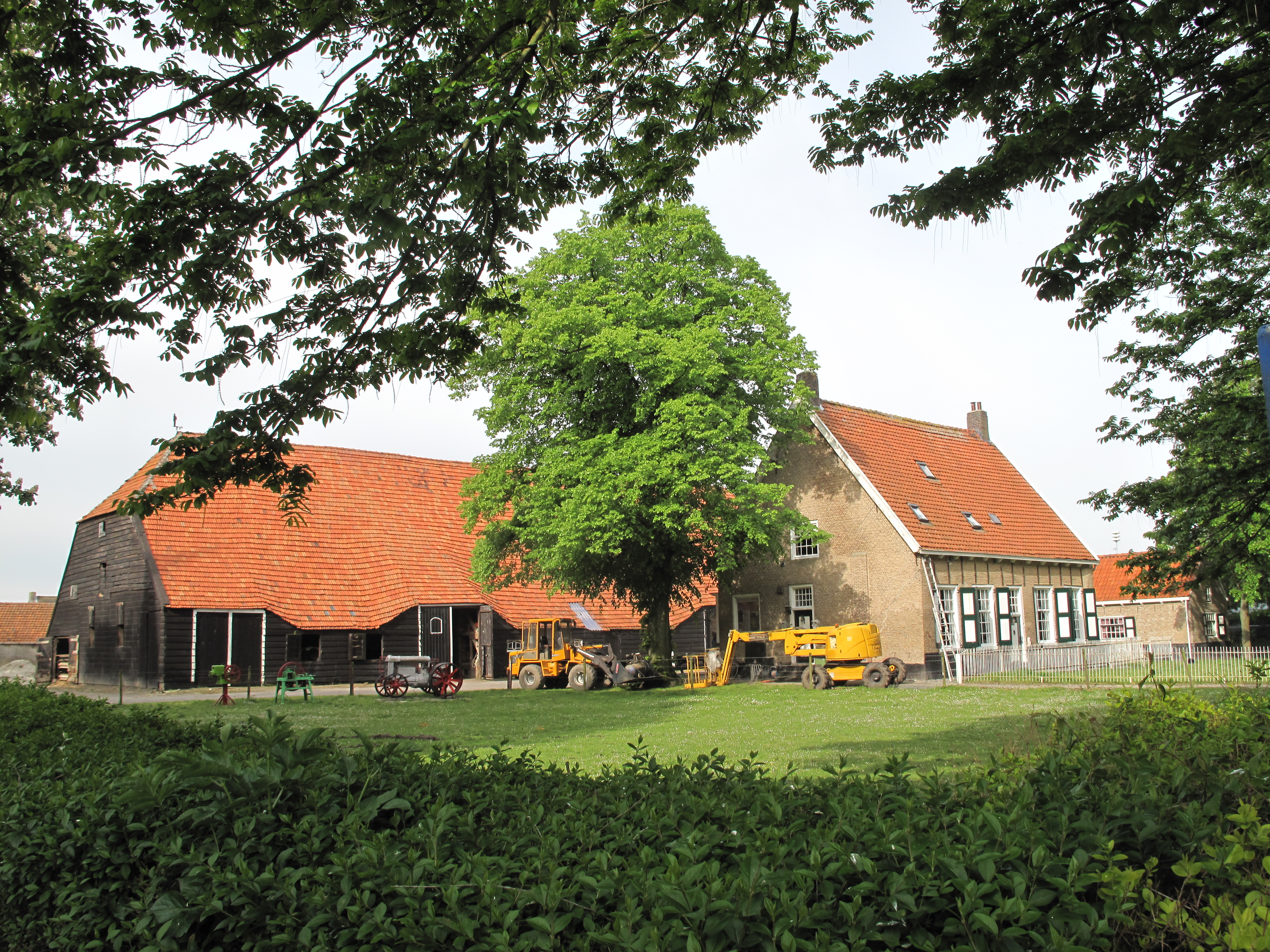
- Farm in Rilland

- Flag Coat of arms

- Location in the province of Zeeland in the Netherlands Rilland (Netherlands)
- Coordinates: 51°24′59″N 4°10′51″E
- Country: Netherlands
- Province: Zeeland
- Municipality: Reimerswaal

Area
  - Total: 56.95 km^{2} (21.99 sq mi)
- Elevation: 1.6 m (5.2 ft)

Population (2021)
  - Total: 3,015
  - Density: 52.94/km^{2} (137.1/sq mi)
- Time zone: UTC+1 (CET)
  - Summer (DST): UTC+2 (CEST)
- Postal code: 4411
- Dialing code: 0113

Rilland is a village in the Dutch province of Zeeland. It is located in the municipality of Reimerswaal.

== History ==
The village was first mentioned in 1186 as Relant, and means land and reed. The name was originally used for the former island which contained the village. The original village was lost in a flood in 1530. In 1773, the Reigersbergsepolder was completed and Rilland developed as a road village.

The Reformed Church was built in 1899. It is a small aisleless church. The front of the church was renewed after the 1953 flood. The Catholic St Joseph church was built in 1903 next to the Capuchin monastery. The monastery was disestablished in 1966 and has become a hotel.

Rilland was home to 366 people in 1840. In 1856, the harbour Rattekaai was constructed and was primarily used for the transportation of sugar beet. A little marina has been added to the west of the harbour.

Rilland was severely damaged during the North Sea flood of 1953. The water rose to 2.5 metres (8 ft 2 in) and 12 people died.

Rilland was a separate municipality until 1878, when it merged with Bath to create the new municipality of Rilland-Bath. In 1970, it became part of the municipality of Reimerswaal. Rilland is known for its various outdoor activities in the surrounding area. It is one of the few villages in Zeeland that has a shooting range, motocross and golf course.

== Transportation ==
The Rilland-Bath railway station opened in 1872 on the Roosendaal to Vlissingen railway line.
