= Gild Fryske Mounders =

Association of windmill operators in Friesland, Netherlands

The Gild Fryske Mounders (English: Frisian Millers Guild) is an association of volunteer millers operating windmills in the Dutch province Friesland. Its goal is to preserve and spread miller knowledge and skills to ensure the availability of enough millers who can responsibly operate all functional windmills in Frisia. For this purpose it offers a volunteer miller training program. Furthermore, it organises the Frisian mills day, excursions and together with De Fryske Mole (English: Frisian Mills Foundation) publishes a quarterly magazine De Utskoat .

== History ==
The Gild Fryske Mounders (Frisian Guild) was founded in 1975 when it broke away from the Gilde van Vrijwillige Molenaars (English: Volunteer Millers Guild), mostly out of discontent with the education and exam procedures of the Gilde van Vrijwillige Molenaars (Dutch Guild) and the exam committee of De Hollandsche Molen. After some years of internal turmoil and discussion with the Dutch Guild it became clear that consensus could not be reached and the Frisian Guild existed independently with its own training program and exam. The number of members gradually increased from 30 at the start to 150 in 1994 though with a constant worry about the low number of millers in training. In 1998 a merger was attempted between the two volunteer miller guilds. The Frisian Guild merged with the Frisian branch of the Dutch Guild and all Frisian diplomas were converted to Dutch certificates. In the end disagreement about the contents of education program and the exam procedures turned out to be too great and in 2003 the Frisian Guild became independent again.

== Volunteer miller training ==
On average half a day per week prospective millers are taught the theory and practice of operating a windmill by a miller at an appointed training mill. The training takes at least one and a half years (though often longer) so the apprentice miller experiences all types of weather common in the Netherlands. The examination committee consists of the teaching miller and two independent experienced millers. The volunteer miller certificates of the Frisian and Dutch guilds are not officially recognised. There are plenty of active millers without a certificate, however mill organisations do often require it.

== See also ==
- Gilde van Vrijwillige Molenaars
- Stichting De Fryske Mole
- De Hollandsche Molen
