= Gilde van Vrijwillige Molenaars =

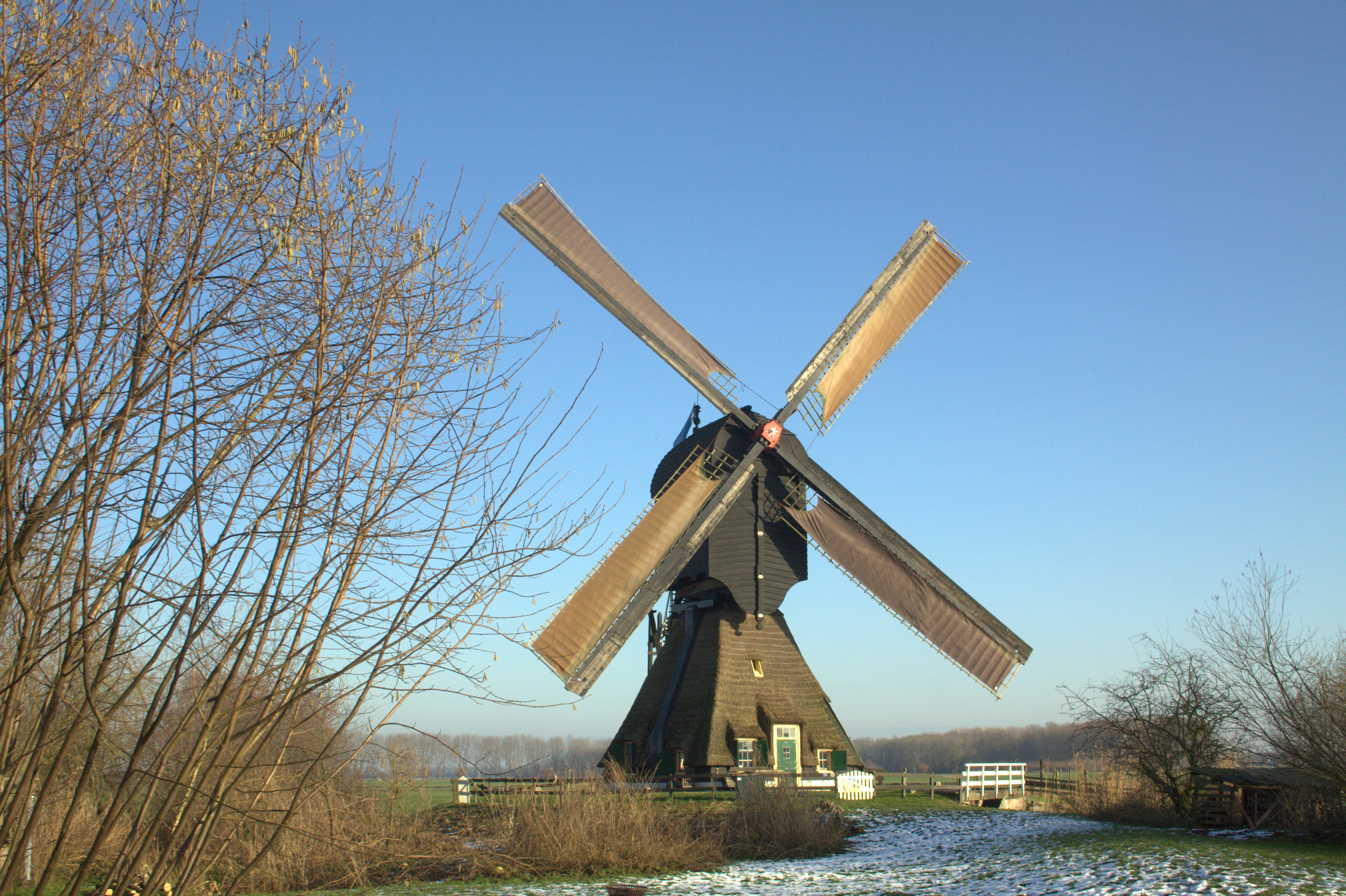

The Gilde van Vrijwillige Molenaars (English: Guild of Volunteer Millers) is a Dutch society of volunteer millers who operate many of the Dutch wind- and watermills. The main goal of the society is to help with the preservation of Dutch windmills by training new millers to run wind- and watermills on a voluntary basis.

== History ==
The number of windmills in the Netherlands had been declining since their task was being taken over by steam, diesel and electric powered machinery against which they could not compete. Attempts to protect and modernise windmills by De Hollandsche Molen in the first half of the twentieth century had slowed the decline somewhat until by the 1960s funds became available for the restoration, repair and upkeep to save the remaining windmills. It had however become very difficult to impossible to commercially operate a mill and the number of aging professional millers rapidly declined threatening the loss of miller skills and knowledge and condemning functional mills to a standstill. A group of windmill enthusiasts therefore set up a miller training course for people willing to operate mills during their free time. In this way the knowledge of professional millers could be passed on and volunteer millers became available to operate the newly restored windmills. This initiative led to the foundation of the Gilde van Vrijwillige Molenaars in 1972. Since then close to 1500 have successfully finished the course. In 1975 volunteer millers in Friesland split off to form the Gild Fryske Mounders.

== Organisation ==
The Gilde van Vrijwillig Molenaars is a national organisation seated in Amsterdam with twelve provincial departments. It publishes a quarterly magazine called Gildebrief. Besides training millers the guild is also active in supporting volunteer millers, for example by offering insurance policies and working on health and safety issues and the protection of the windmill environment (Dutch: molenbiotoop), the ability of the windmill to catch the wind without trees and buildings blocking it. It also cooperates closely with other windmill organisations to promote windmill preservation in general.

=== Miller course ===
The miller course is organised by appointing instructor millers at certain mills to educate apprentice millers in the skills needed to safely operate the mill, commonly weekly a morning or afternoon for at least a year. Exams are taken by the exam committee of De Hollandse Molen on an appointed exam mill. Those who pass are award a certificate. Though it has no official status many windmill organisations request or require this certificate of their volunteer millers.

Until 1997 there was only a course for windmills. Since then a separate course for watermills has been set up.
