= Hoed =

Hoed may refer to:

- De Hoed, a historic Dutch windmill
- Pat Hoed (born 1963), an American singer and radio personality
