= Breezand, Zeeland =

Breezand
- Neighbourhood and seaside resort
- Location in the province of Zeeland in the Netherlands Breezand (Netherlands)
- Coordinates: 51°35′9″N 3°37′20″E
- Country: Netherlands
- Province: Zeeland
- Municipality: Veere

Area
  - Total: 0.57 km^{2} (0.22 sq mi)
- Elevation: 2.1 m (6.9 ft)

Population (2021)
  - Total: 35
  - Density: 61/km^{2} (160/sq mi)
- Time zone: UTC+1 (CET)
  - Summer (DST): UTC+2 (CEST)
- Postal code: 4354
- Dialing code: 0118

Breezand is a seaside resort and bungalow park of Vrouwenpolder in the Dutch province of Zeeland. It is a part of the municipality of Veere, and lies about 10 km north of Middelburg.

In 1930, the first recreational houses were built in the dunes near the Vrouwenpolder. The bungalow park Breezand was extended in the 1960 with hotels and shops and transformed in a seaside resort.
