= Stichting De Fryske Mole =

Dutch windmill preservation organisation

The Stichting De Fryske Mole (Dutch pronunciation: [ˈstɪxtɪŋ də ˈfriskə ˈmoːlə]; West Frisian: Stifting De Fryske Mole [ˈstɪftɪŋ də ˈfriskə ˈmoːlə]; English: Frisian Mills Foundation) is a foundation for the preservation of windmills in the Dutch province Friesland, owning 42 of the 124 windmills in Friesland and closely co-operating with the Gild Fryske Mounders with which it publishes a quarterly magazine, De Utskoat. The Stichting De Fryske Mole was founded in December 1970 to preserve those mills that were otherwise difficult to save. Consequently, all of the foundation's mills are drainage mills often standing in remote locations where there are no other parties interested in or able to pay for restoration and maintenance.

== See also ==
- Gild Fryske Mounders
- De Hollandsche Molen
