= Vrouwenpolder =

- Village
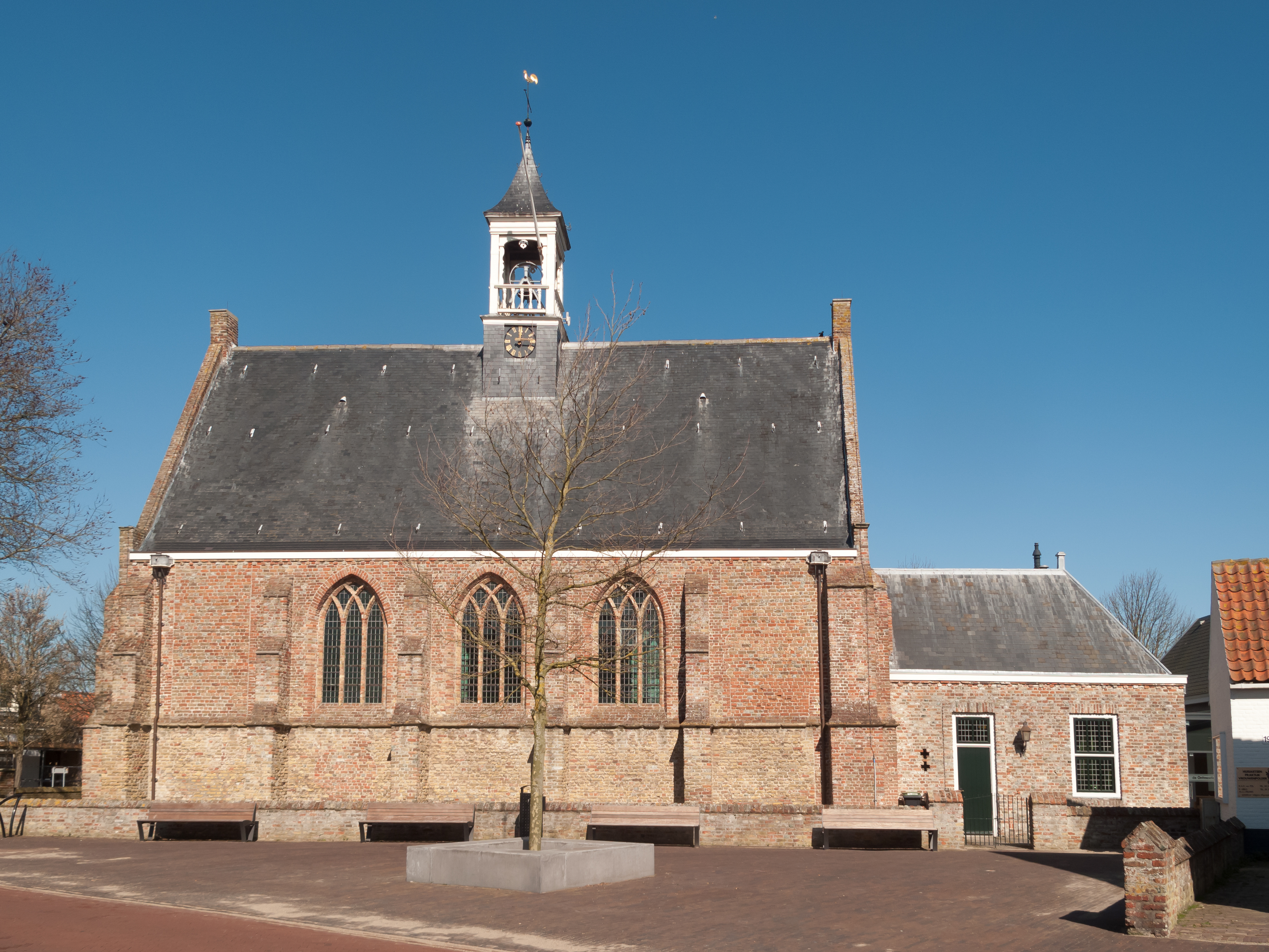
- Church: de Pelgrimskerk

- Coat of arms

- Location in the province of Zeeland in the Netherlands Vrouwenpolder (Netherlands)
- Coordinates: 51°34′34″N 3°36′55″E
- Country: Netherlands
- Province: Zeeland
- Municipality: Veere

Area
  - Total: 13.28 km^{2} (5.13 sq mi)
- Elevation: 2.1 m (6.9 ft)

Population (2021)
  - Total: 1,015
  - Density: 76.43/km^{2} (198.0/sq mi)
- Time zone: UTC+1 (CET)
  - Summer (DST): UTC+2 (CEST)
- Postal code: 4354
- Dialing code: 0118

Vrouwenpolder is a village in the Dutch province of Zeeland. It is a part of the municipality of Veere, and lies about 9 km north of Middelburg. The name is derived from "the polder of Our Lady", referring to the Virgin Mary.

== History ==
The village was first mentioned in 1338 as "up die polre", and is a reference to the eponymous polder which was created in 1299. Vrouwen is a reference to Mary, mother of Jesus for whom was a chapel built in the village shortly after 1314.

The chapel was elevated to parish church in 1324, and became a site of pilgrimage in the 14th century due to presence of a miraculous painting. The medieval church was destroyed in 1572 during the Dutch Revolt, and rebuilt in 1624 as a single aisled Dutch Reformed church with a ridge turret.

In 1588, Fort den Haak was built to protect the Veerse Gat. In 1809, the English attacked and conquered the fort, however they were unable to make progress and left again. Vrouwenpolder was home to 385 people in 1840.

During the Battle of the Scheldt the land was inundated and Vrouwenpolder was damaged by bombing. 8 November 1944, coastal battery W19 near Vrouwenpolder, the last German stronghold surrendered.

Vrouwenpolder was a separate municipality until 1966, when it was merged with Veere. Its formal long name was 'Onze-Lieve-Vrouwenpolder, Schellach en Zanddijk-Buiten'. The former municipality of Gapinge was added to O.L.Vrouwenpolder in 1857.

== Beach ==
In 1930, the first recreational houses were built in the dunes near the village. The bungalow park Breezand was extended in the 1960 with hotels and shops and transformed in a seaside resort.

Between the dunes and village, Oranjezon is located, a 400 hectares (990 acres) nature area.

There is a nudist beach at Vrouwenpolder.

== Gallery ==
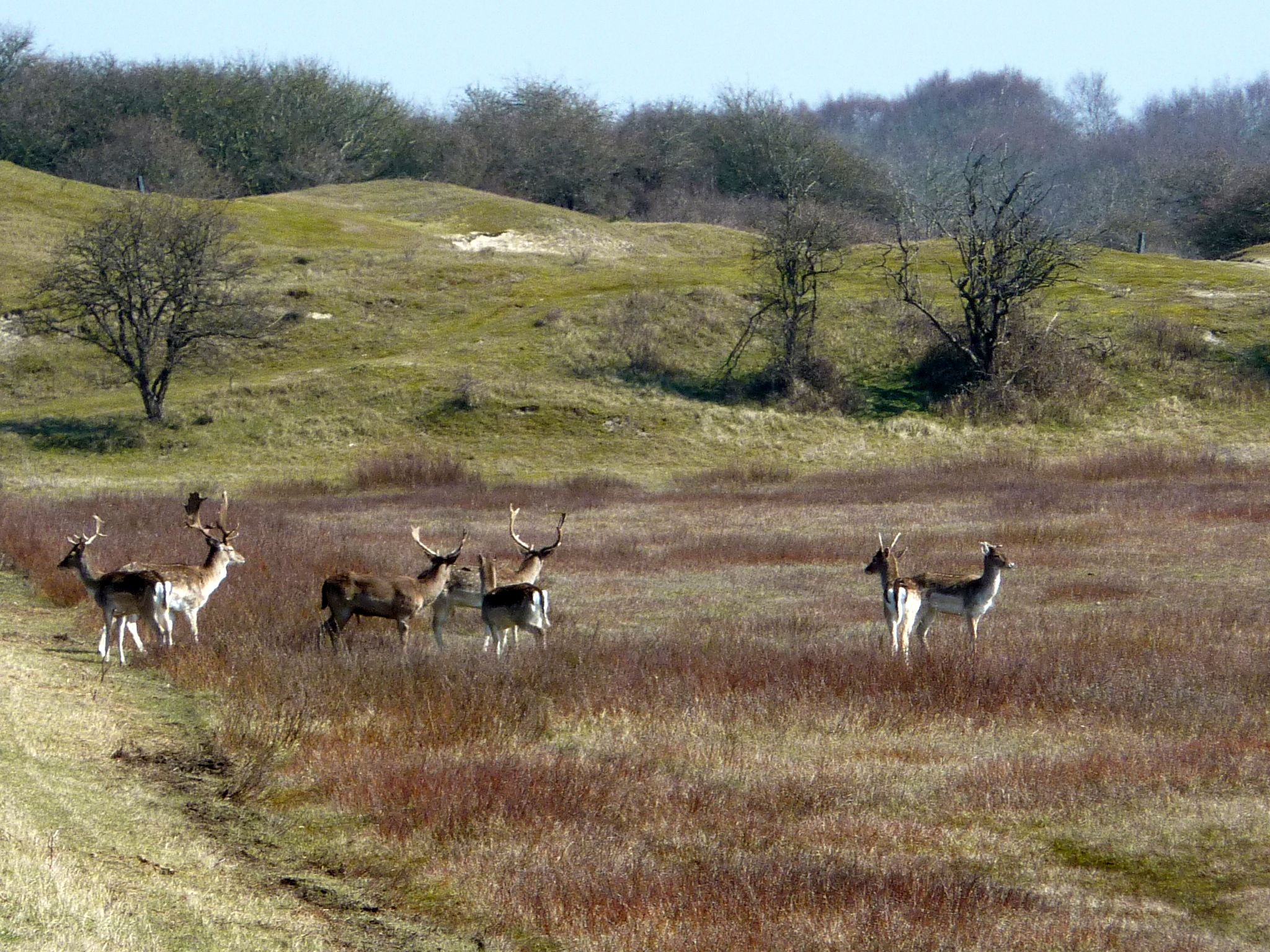
Oranjezon nature area

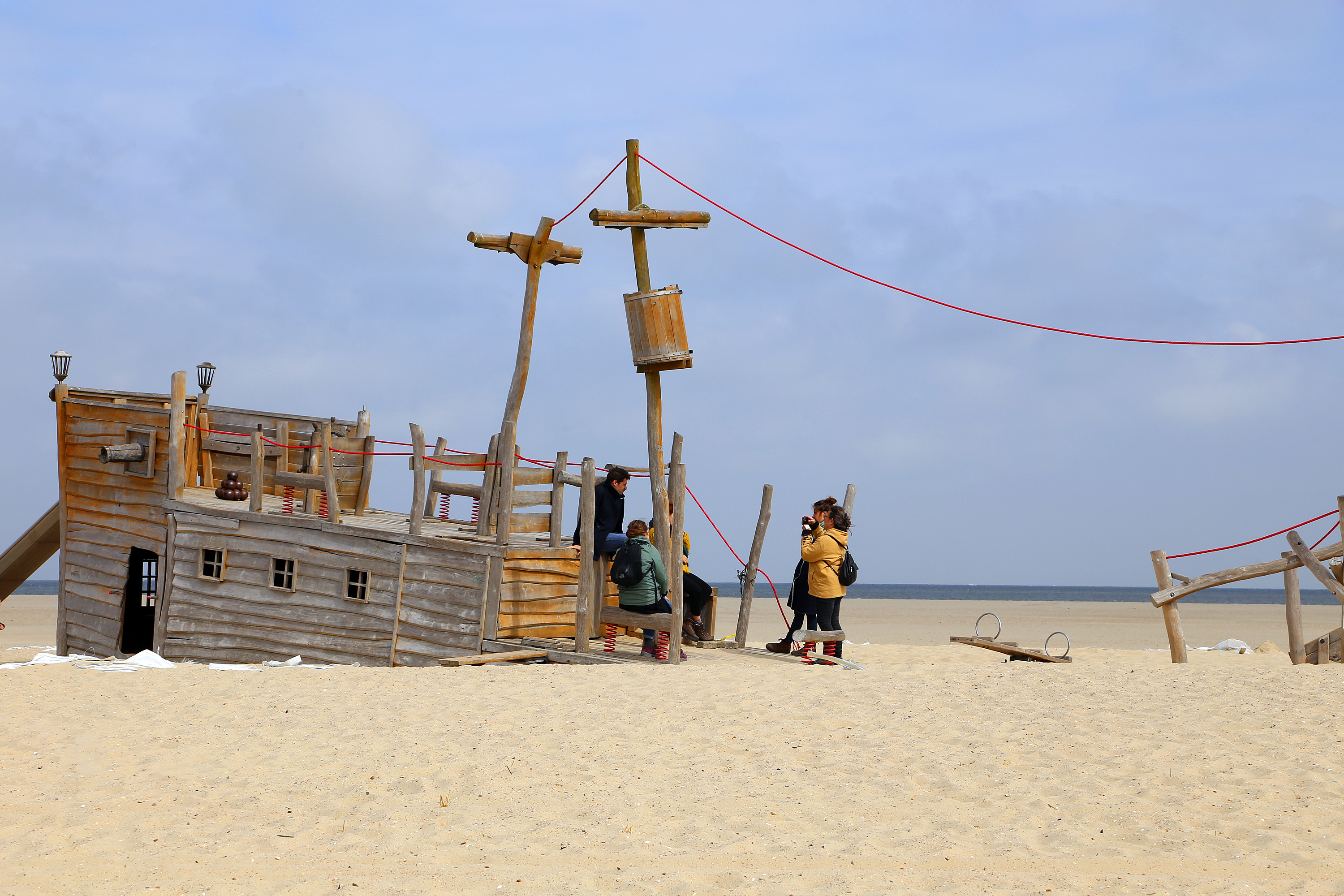
Beach of Vrouwenpolder
