= Torenmolen van Gronsveld, Maastricht =

Windmill in Maastricht, Netherlands

Torenmolen van Gronsveld
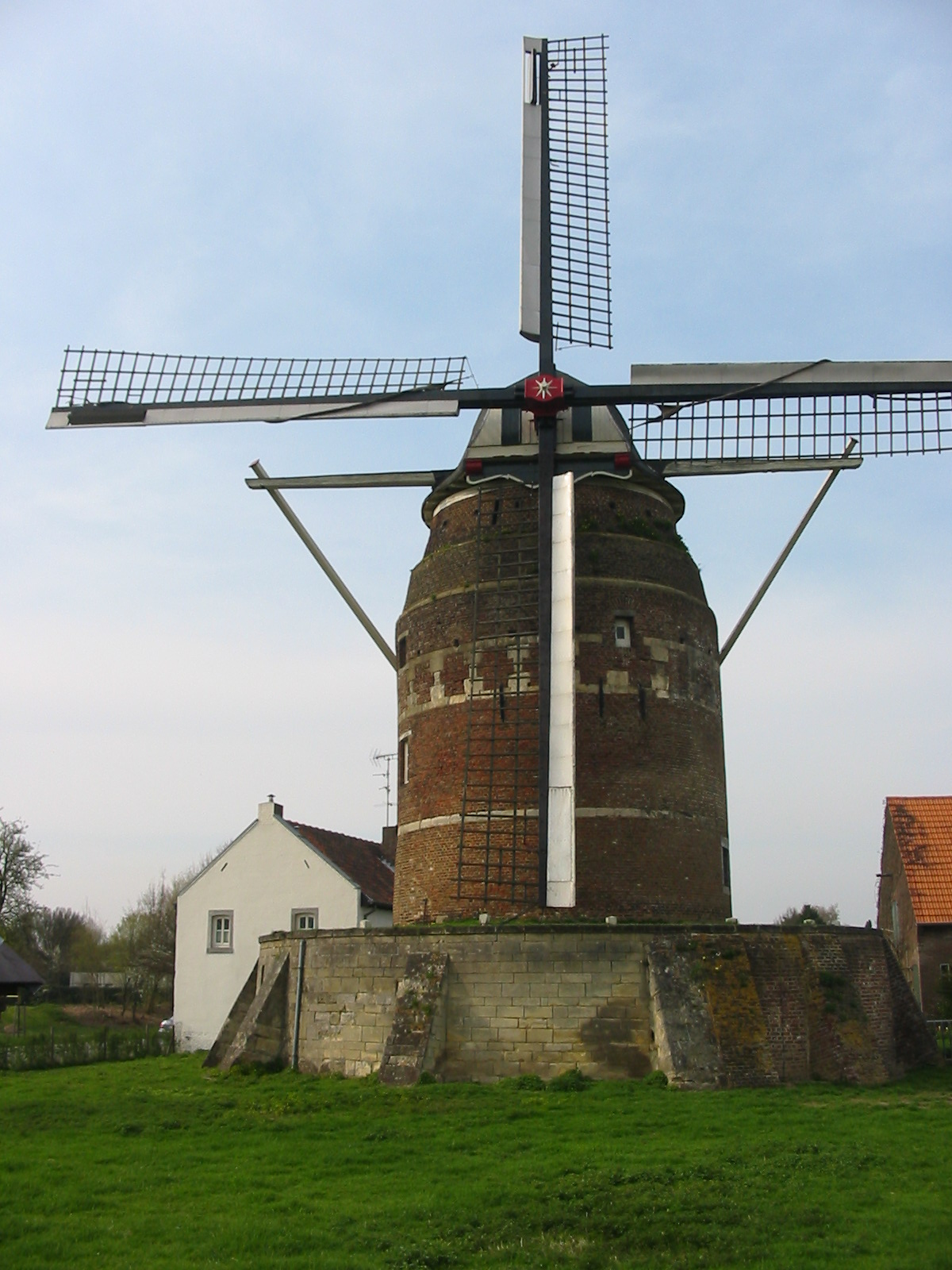
- The towermill of Gronsveld, 2006

Origin
- Mill name: Torenmolen van Gronsveld
- Mill location: Rijksweg 90 6228 XZ Maastricht
- Coordinates: 50.824432°N 5.729508°E
- Operator(s): Molenstichting Limburg
- Year built: 1623

Information
- Purpose: Corn mill
- Type: Tower mill
- Storeys: Five storeys
- No. of sails: Four sails
- Type of sails: Common sails with Van Bussel leading edges
- Windshaft: cast iron
- Winding: Tailpole and winch
- No. of pairs of millstones: One pair
- Size of millstones: 140 centimetres (4.6 ft) diameter
- Other information: Uses a mound instead of stage to set the sails. Built in two stages.

The Torenmolen van Gronsveld (Dutch pronunciation: [ˈtoːrəˌmoːlə(ɱ) vɑŋ ˈɣrɔnsˌfɛlt]) is a tower mill near Gronsveld in the municipally of Maastricht, the Netherlands, which is still in working order. The mill was built in 1623 and is listed as a Rijksmonument, number 28086. It is the most southerly windmill in the Netherlands and the oldest of the province Limburg.

== History ==
Construction of the towermill of Gronsveld was started in 1618 by order of Joest Maximilian van Bronckhorst, count of Gronsfelt and was finished in 1623. The cylindrical shaped mill was raised in 1766 with a tapering part which has given it its distinctive shape. The mound around the mill was raised at the same time. The windmill remained property of the Van Bronckhorst family and later, by marriage, the Törring family until it was confiscated by the government in the French-Batavian period and publicly sold in 1805. The buyer was Van Gulpen who sold the mill on to miller Jacobus Jacobs who expanded the milling business with a farm. After his death Catharina Jacobs became the owner.

In the 1860s she managed to have the newly planted trees along the nearby state road replaced by Acacias as she feared the trees, once they had fully grown, would block the wind coming towards the mill. The incident got national attention at the time and the typical roadside planting remains today. After Catharinas death the mill became property of her daughter Alphonsine Bemelmans in 1889. Alphonsine sold the mill and farm in 1919 to the woodtrader Dahmen who resold it to the baker Henri Jacobs. In 1924 Joseph Michael Thomma became the leaseholder. By that time the farm was generating most of the income, and Thomma bought himself a small electric-powered mill, so the windmill fell into disrepair.

The first initiatives to restore the mill were taken in 1941 by Stichting Het Limburgs Landschap (Foundation for the Limburgian landscape) and De Hollandsche Molen so it could be used for food supply during the war. However, because of material shortages nothing came of it and the mill caught fire from fighting during the liberation of Limburg in 1944. The mill was restored from a burned out shell in 1959 using stocks, brakeshaft and front tie beam from a mill in Horssen while other moving parts came from a dismantled mill in Maarheeze. In the early 1970s the mill was restored to working order and since that time has been in regular use.

== Description ==
The torenmolen van Gronsveld is a five storey brick tower mill. The vertical walls up to the stone floor are 1.9 metres (6 ft 3 in) thick and house a spiral staircase and a shaft for the sack hoist. The meal floor has two hearths built into the wall, either one of which could be used depending on the wind direction. The first floor served as a storage room and is supported by a vaulted roof over the entrance on the ground floor. A 3 metres (9 ft 10 in) high mound was thrown up around the mill for the miller to reach the sails.

The mound is supported on the outside by a wall of chalk blocks. The mill is winded by a tailpole and winch with the roofing felt covered cap resting of a dead curb of wooden blocks. The four common sails with Van Bussel leading edges and air brakes have a span of 24.6 metres (80 ft 9 in). They are carried on a cast-iron windshaft which also carries the brake wheel which drives the wallower at the top of the upright shaft. At the bottom of the upright shaft, the great spur wheel drives the one pairs of mill stones of 1.50 metres (4 ft 11 in) diameter via a lantern pinion stone nut.

== Public Access ==
The windmill is open to the public every first and third Saturday of the month.
