= List of windmills in Flevoland =

List of Dutch windmills

A list of windmills in the Dutch province of Flevoland.

Location	Name of mill	Type	Built	Notes	Photograph
Biddinghuizen	52°26′16″N 5°45′33″E	Wipmolen	1984	Moved to Bloemendaal, North Holland 1994.	
Biddinghuizen	De Vrijheid; 52°N 5°E	Stellingmolen	1982	Moved to Kaatsheuvel, North Brabant 2000.	
Urk	52°39′48″N 5°36′35″E	Weidemolen	Between 1842 and 1854	Demolished between 1863 and 1917.	

== Notes ==
Mills still standing marked in bold. Known building dates are bold, otherwise the date is the earliest known date the mill was standing.
