= Gapinge =

- Villages
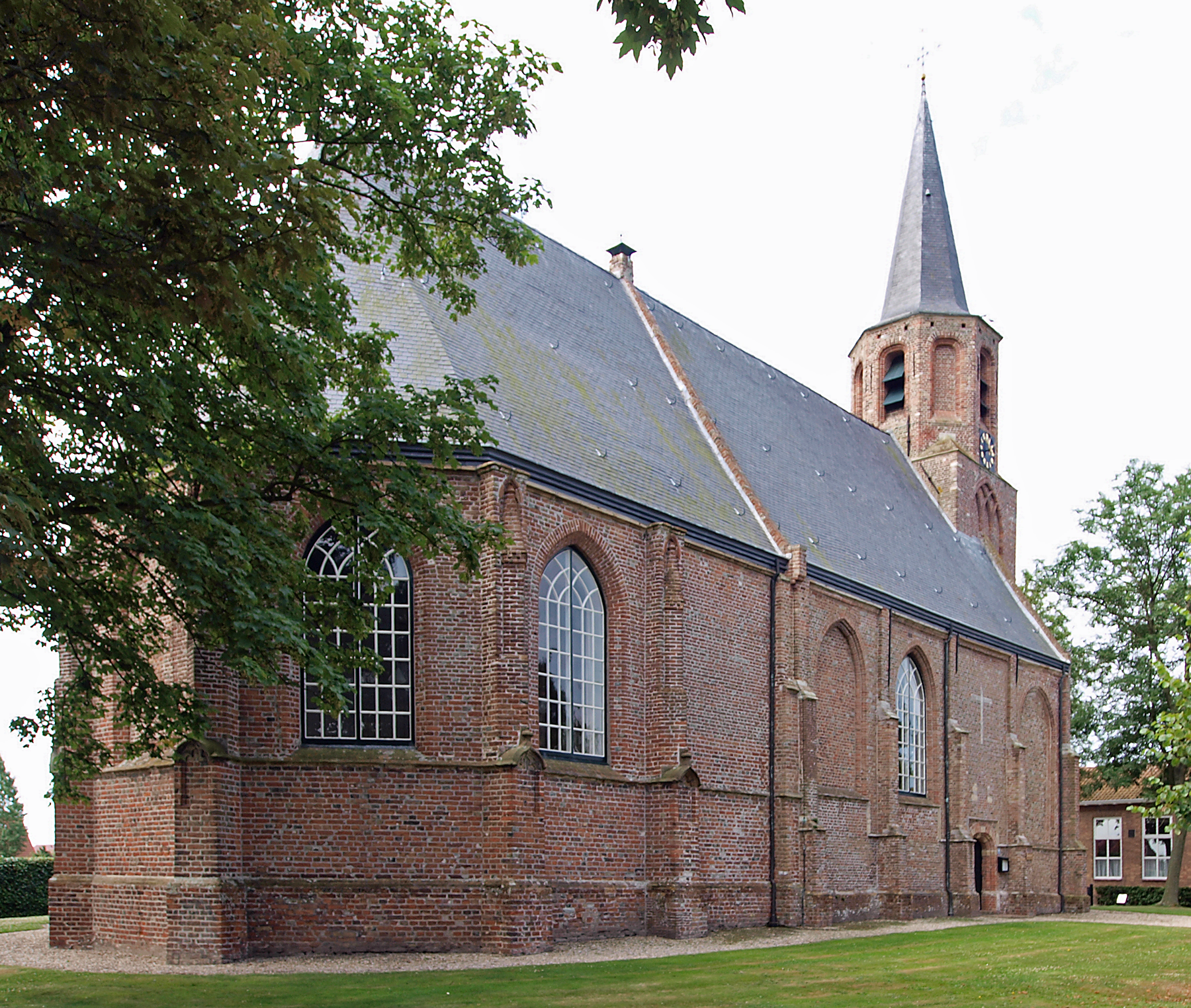
- Dutch Reformed Church

- Coat of arms

- Location in the province of Zeeland in the Netherlands Gapinge (Netherlands)
- Coordinates: 51°32′38″N 3°37′28″E
- Country: Netherlands
- Province: Zeeland
- Municipality: Veere

Area
  - Total: 21.34 km^{2} (8.24 sq mi)
- Elevation: 2.9 m (9.5 ft)

Population (2021)
  - Total: 1,550
  - Density: 72.6/km^{2} (188/sq mi)
- Time zone: UTC+1 (CET)
  - Summer (DST): UTC+2 (CEST)
- Postal code: 4521
- Dialing code: 0115

Gapinge is a village in the Dutch province of Zeeland. It is a part of the municipality of Veere, and lies about 6 km north of Middelburg.

== History ==
The village was first mentioned in 1216 as Gapinge, and means "settlement near the widening of a creek". Gapinge is an incomplete circular church village.

The Dutch Reformed church is a single aisled church. The tower dates from the early 15th century. Between 1947 and 1949, the damage from the inundation of 1944 was repaired. The vliedberg is an artificial mound for a motte-and-bailey castle and was constructed between the 11th and 13th century.

Gapinge was home to 203 people in 1840. It was an independent municipality until 1857 when it was merged into Vrouwenpolder. In 1966, it became part of the municipality of Veere.

== Gallery ==
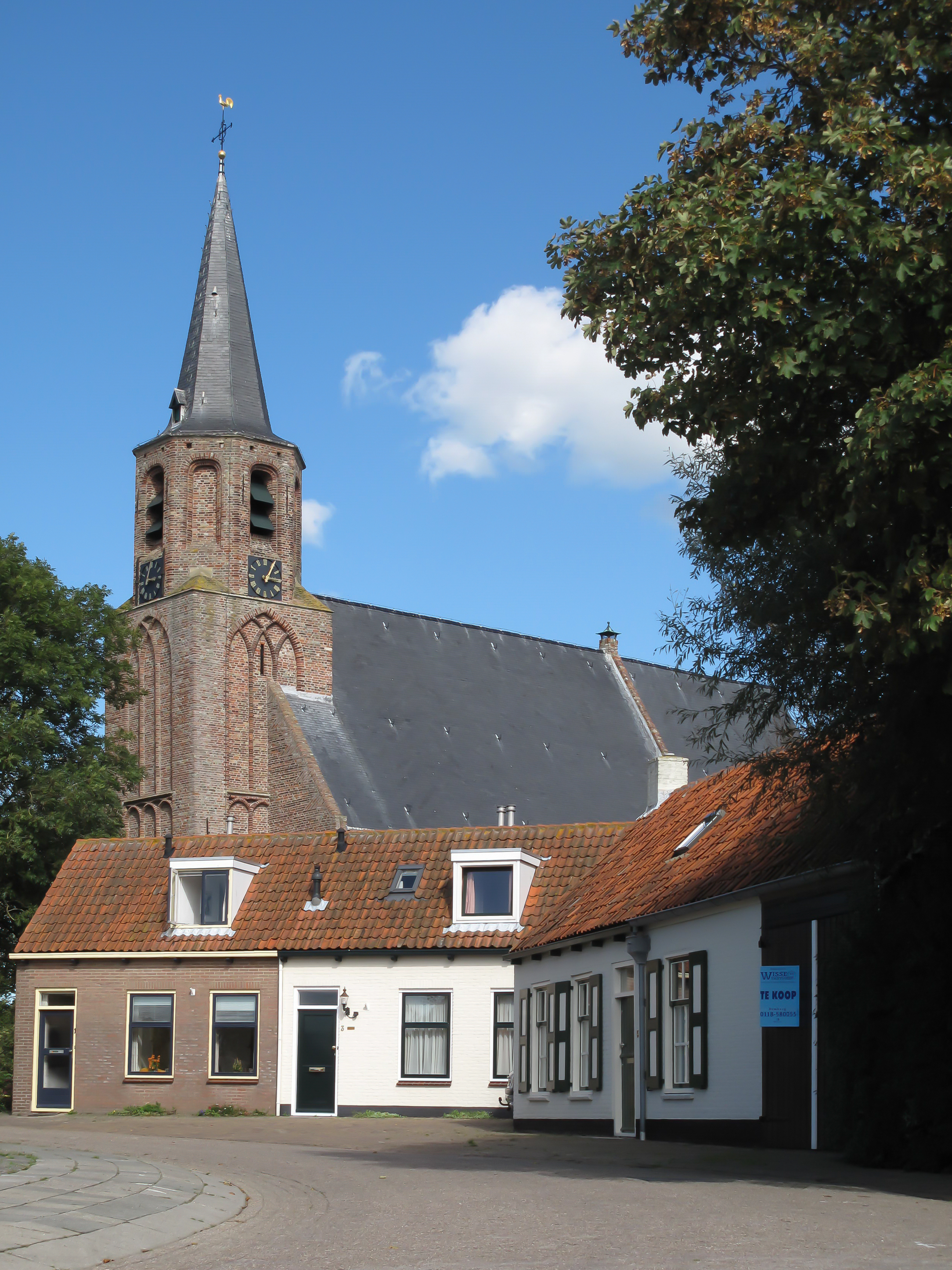
Gapinge, Protestant church, Torenkerk

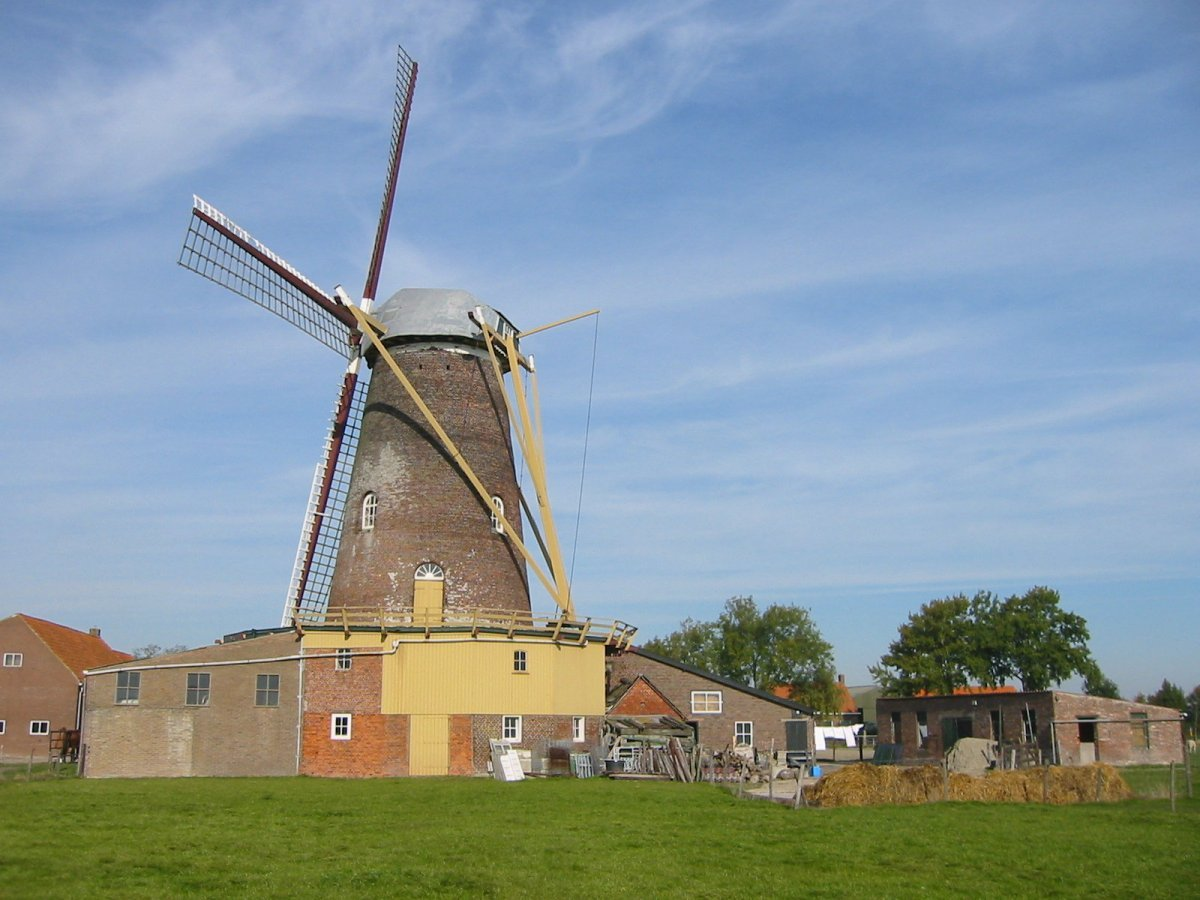
Wind mill De Graanhalm

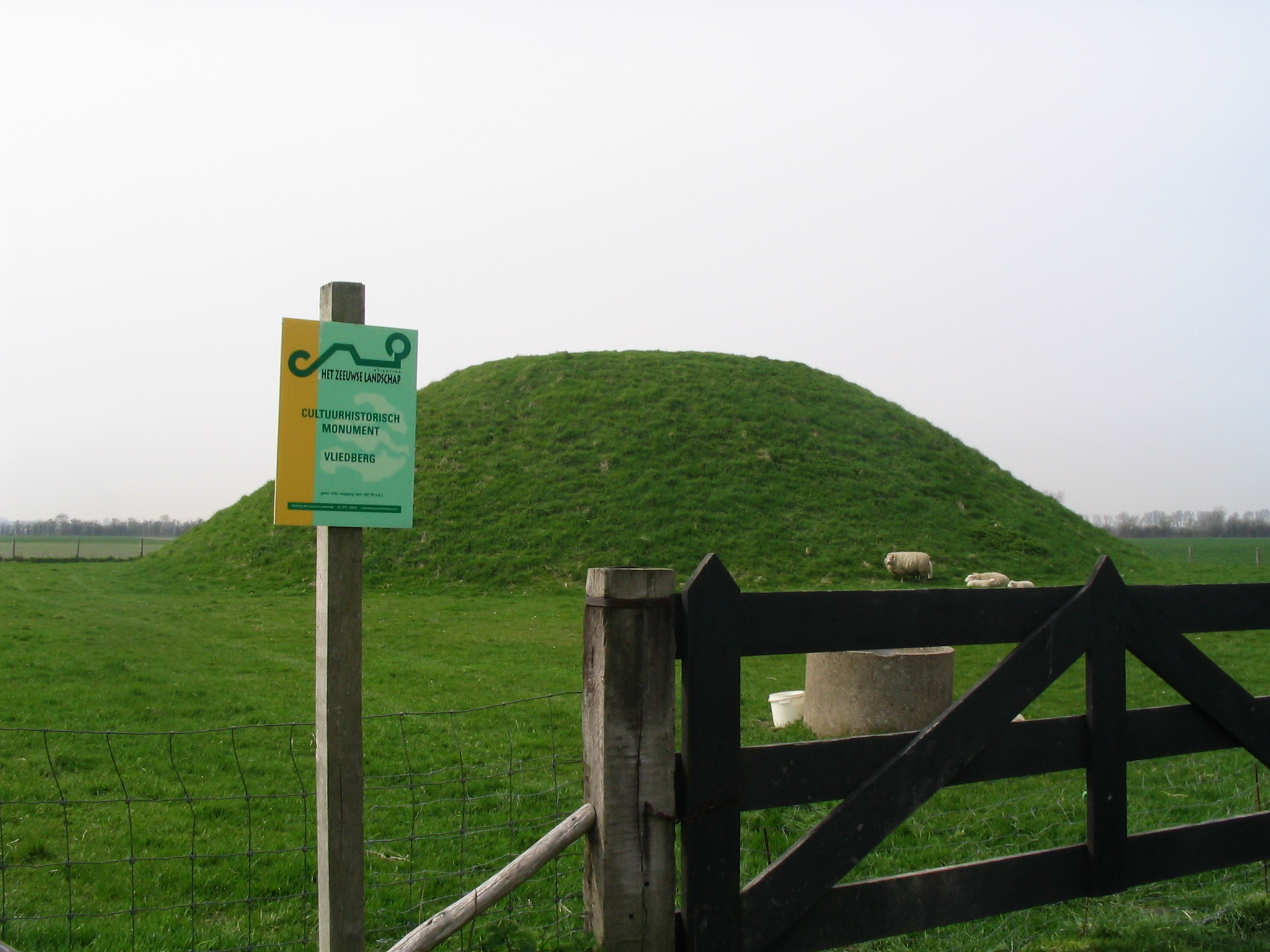
Vliedberg

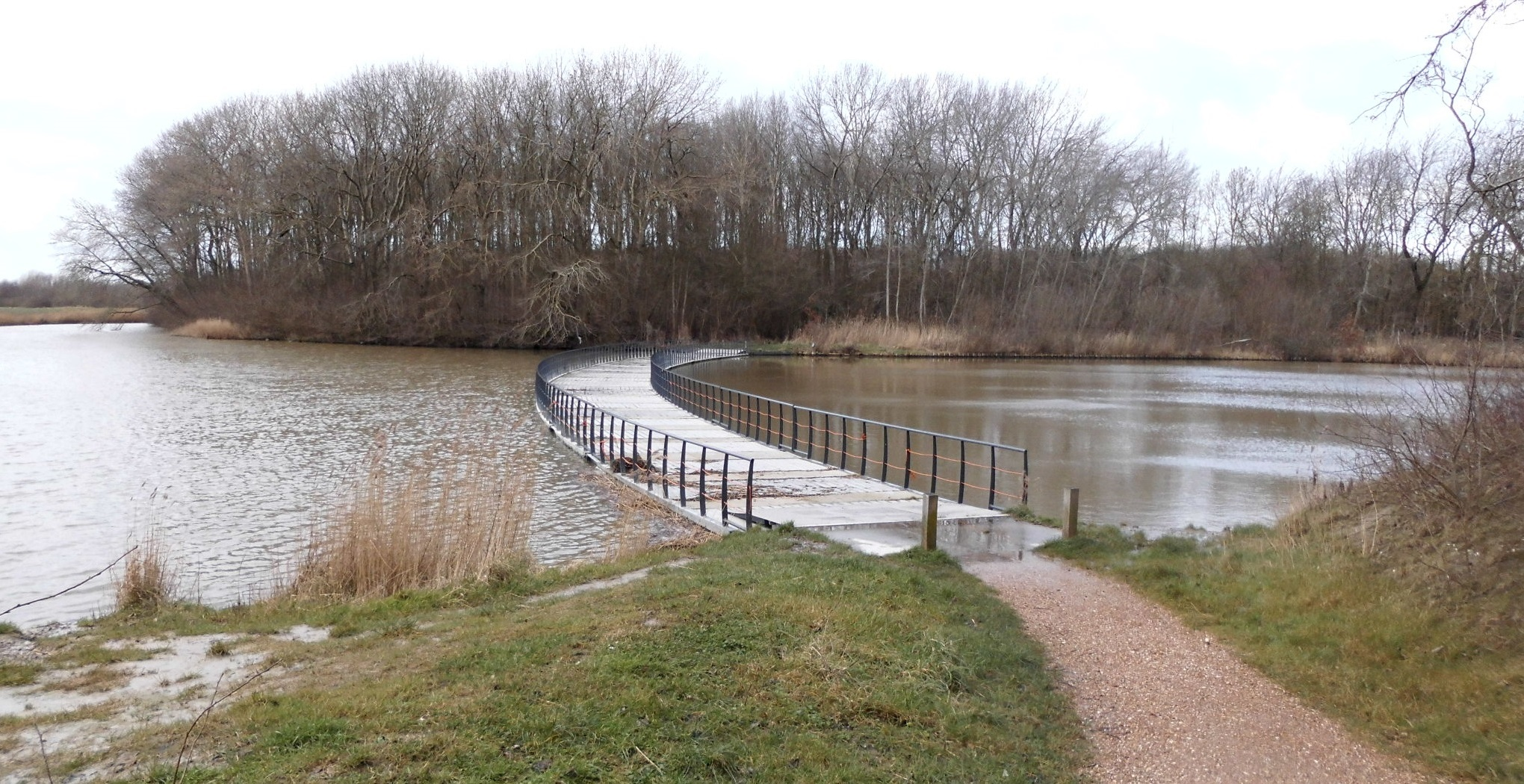
Ponton bridge

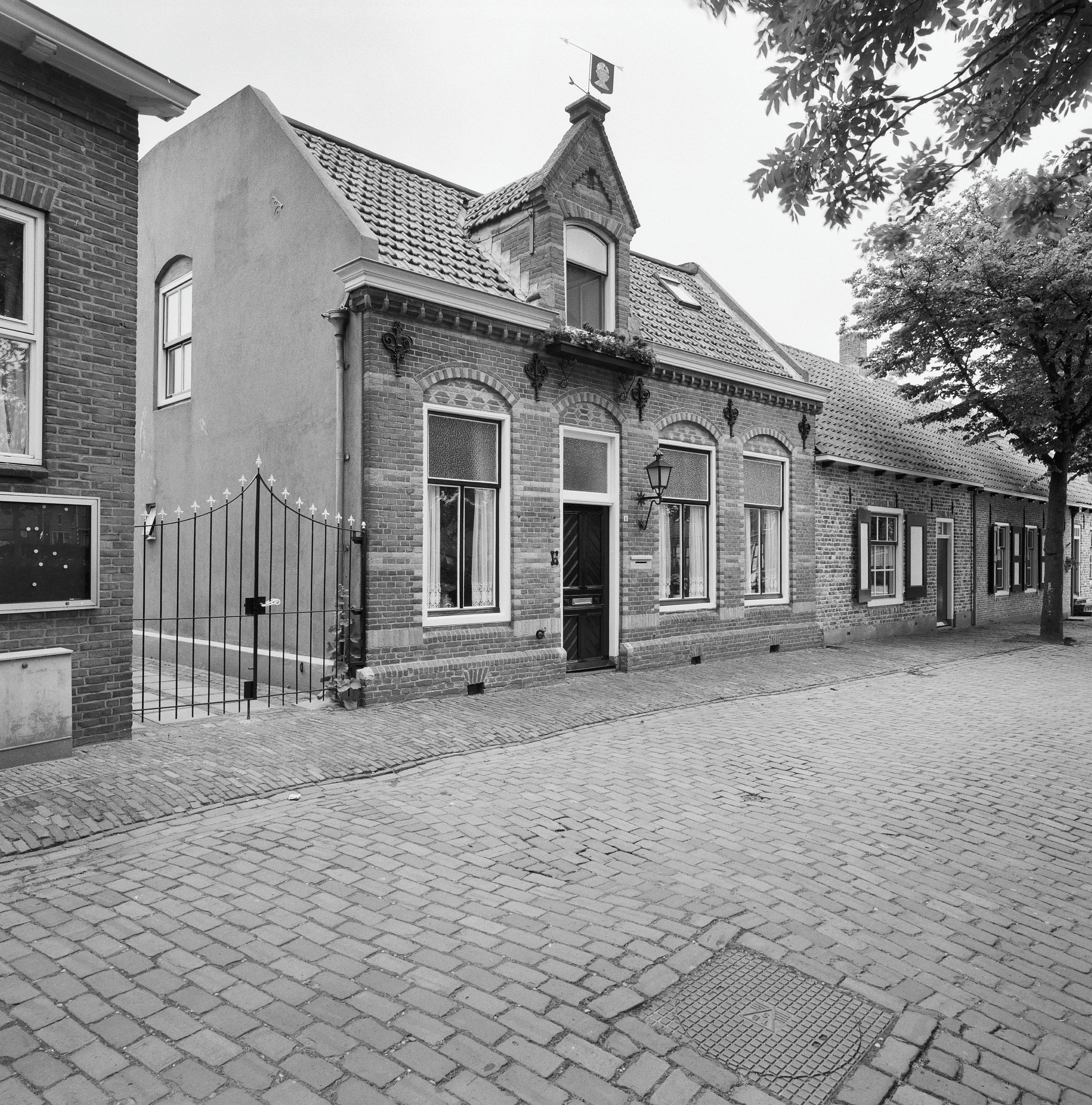
School teacher's house
