= Bath, Netherlands =

Bath
- Village
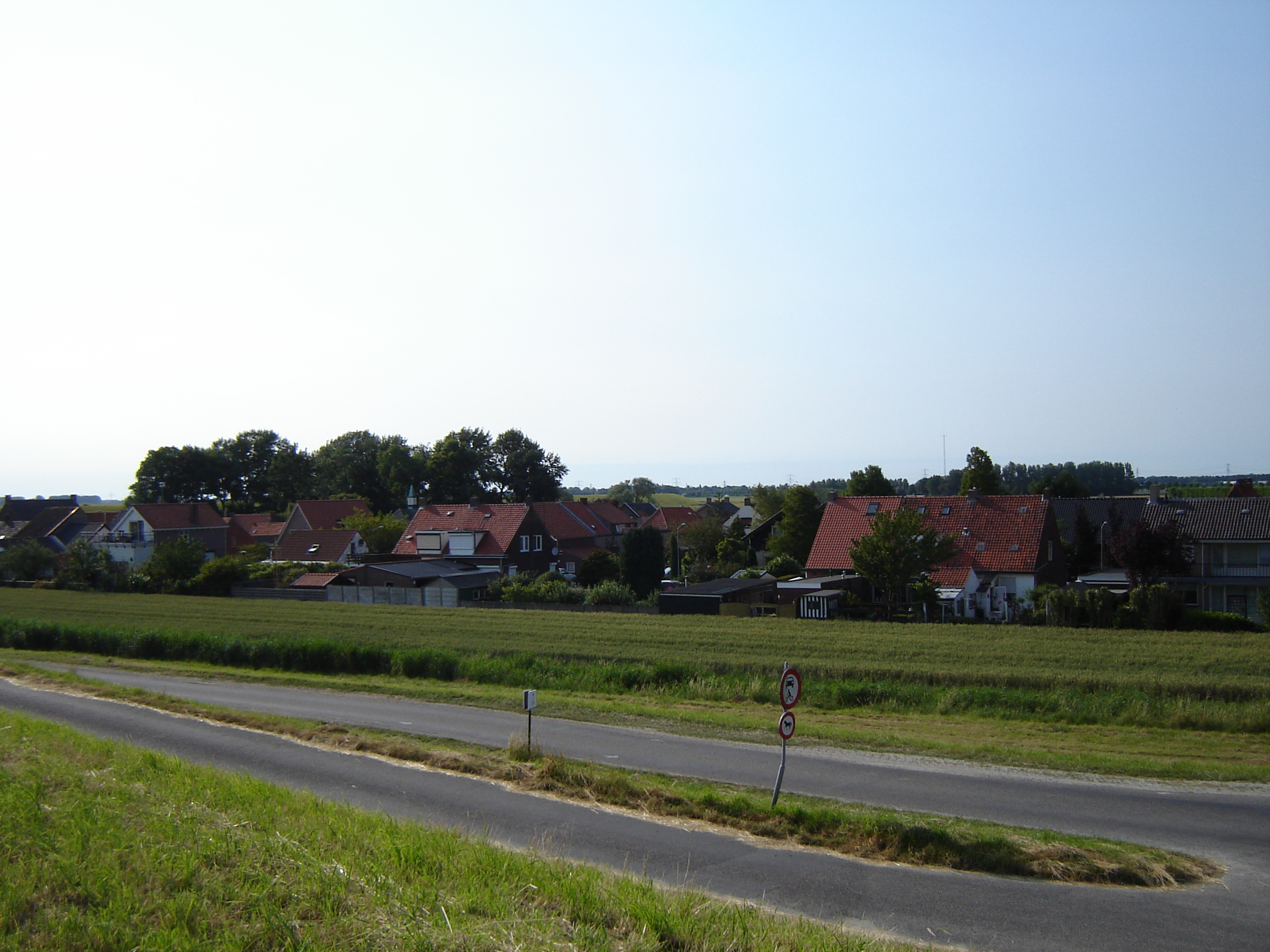
- View on Bath

- Coat of arms

- Location in the province of Zeeland in the Netherlands Bath (Netherlands)
- Coordinates: 51°24′11″N 4°12′34″E
- Country: Netherlands
- Province: Zeeland
- Municipality: Reimerswaal

Area
  - Total: 0.07 km^{2} (0.027 sq mi)
- Elevation: 1.6 m (5.2 ft)

Population (2021)
  - Total: 85
  - Density: 1,200/km^{2} (3,100/sq mi)
- Time zone: UTC+1 (CET)
  - Summer (DST): UTC+2 (CEST)
- Postal code: 4411
- Dialing code: 0113

Bath is a small village and a former municipality in the Dutch province of Zeeland, lying on the north shore of the Western Scheldt. It is now located in the municipality of Reimerswaal, about 10 km southwest of Bergen op Zoom.

== History ==
The village was first mentioned in 1325 as "insula de Boestenbare dicta". The current name refers to the Bad Creek (compare: bath).

According to the 19th-century historian A.J. van der Aa, the former village of Bath was hit by floods several times in the 16th century: in 1530, 1532, 1536 and 1539. After these floods, only the church tower of the village was left, but it too had disappeared by the 19th century. In 1773, a part of the area was reclaimed from the sea again, and a fort, Fort Bath, was built in 1785 to protect the ships who collected the toll for passing ships. A small hamlet was built inside the fort; this became the new village of Bath. The structure contained a square fort with three bastions surrounded by a moat. In 1809, it was destroyed during the Walcheren Campaign, and was rebuilt between 1830 and 1834. In 1867, it was deemed obsolete.

Bath was home to 299 people in 1840. In 1950, a little church was built by the Free Evangelical Congregation. The village was flooded during the North Sea flood of 1953.

Bath was a separate municipality until 1878 (called "Fort Bath" until 1816), when it became a part of the municipality of Rilland-Bath.

== Transportation ==
In 1872, the Rilland-Bath railway station was built on the Roosendaal to Vlissingen railway line.

== Gallery ==
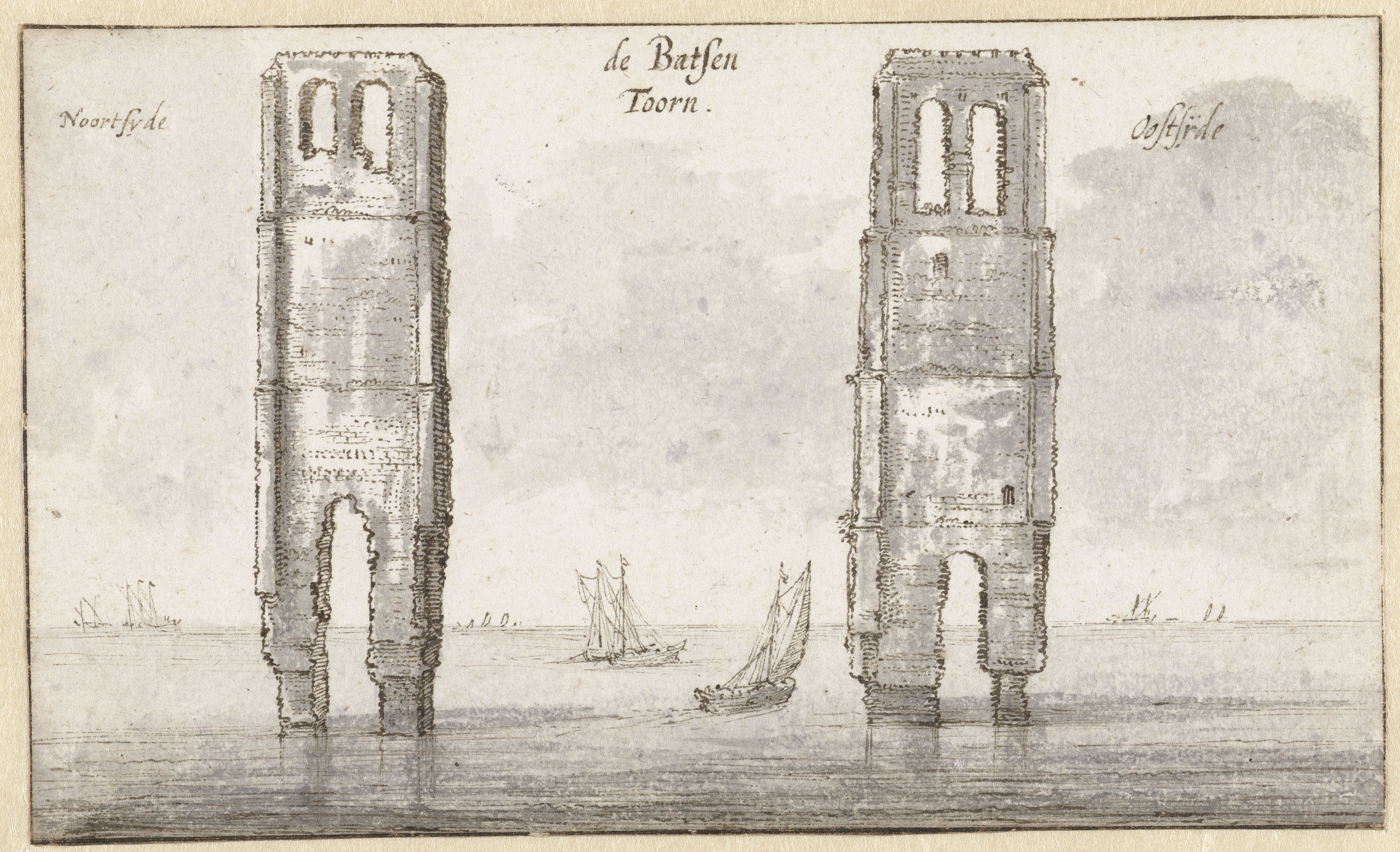
The ruins of the church towers in the 1630s

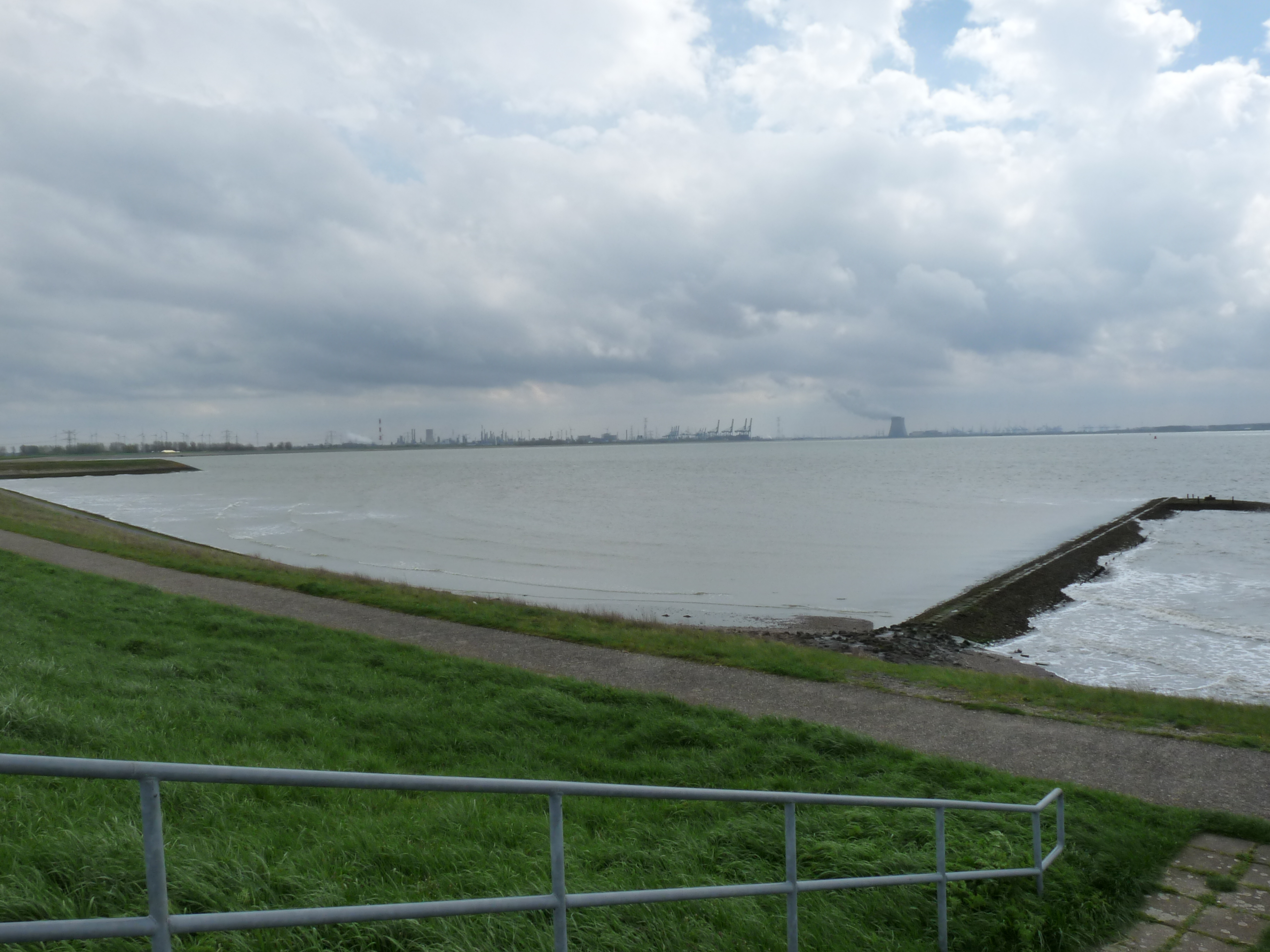
The Schelde as seen from Bath

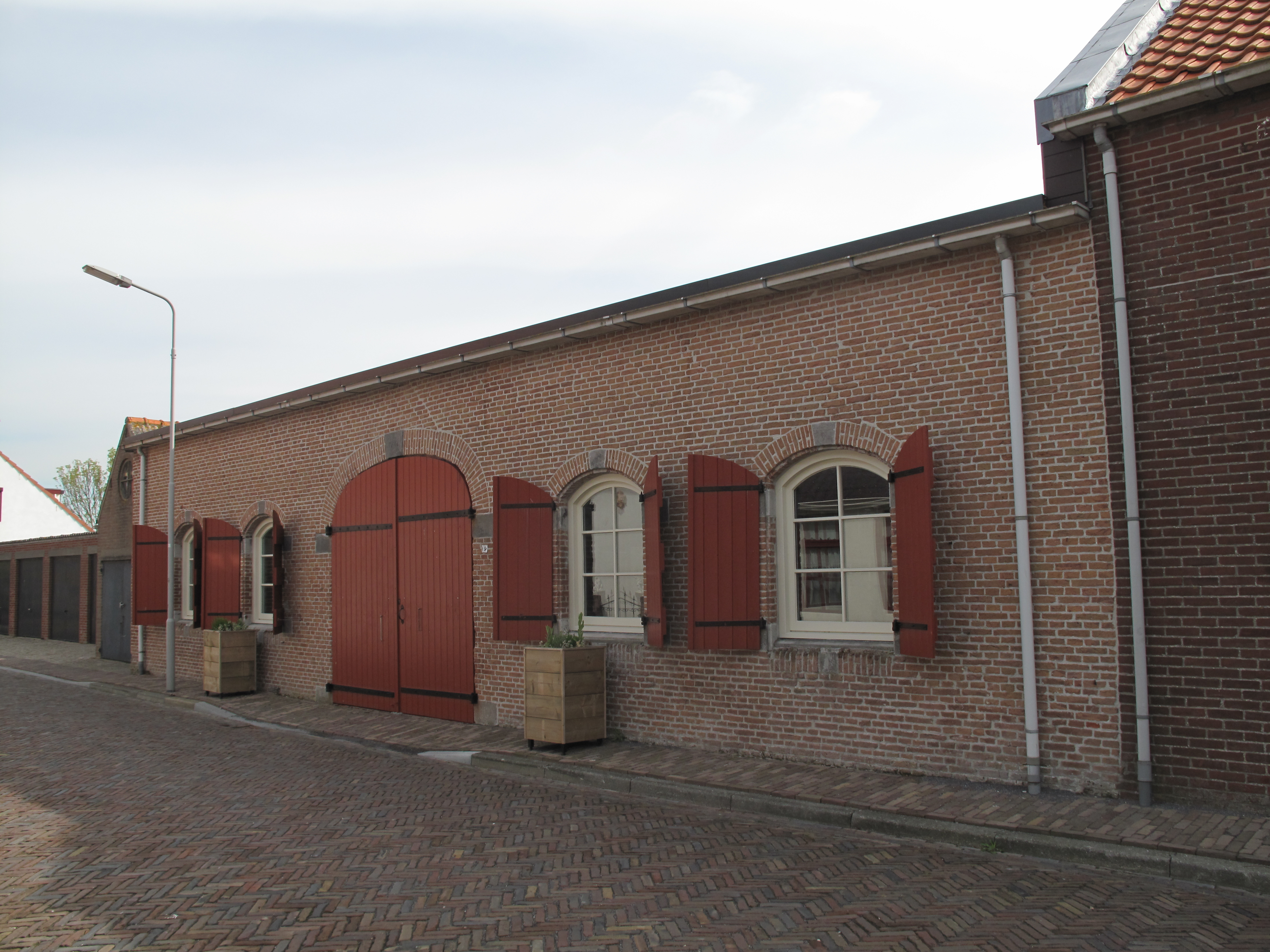
Former arsenal

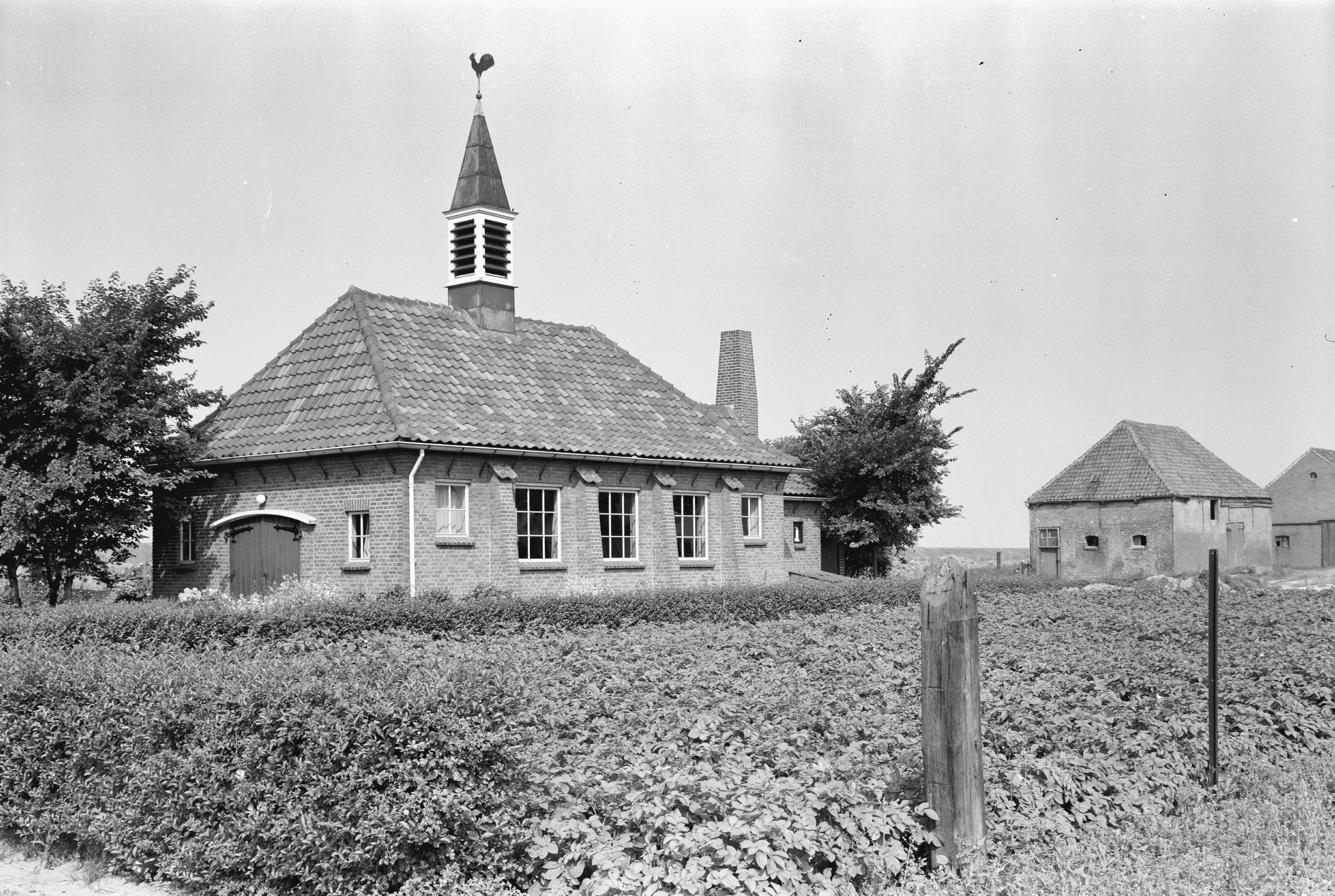
Little church and military buildings
