= Rilland-Bath =

Former municipality in the Netherlands

Coordinates: 51°25′N 4°11′E

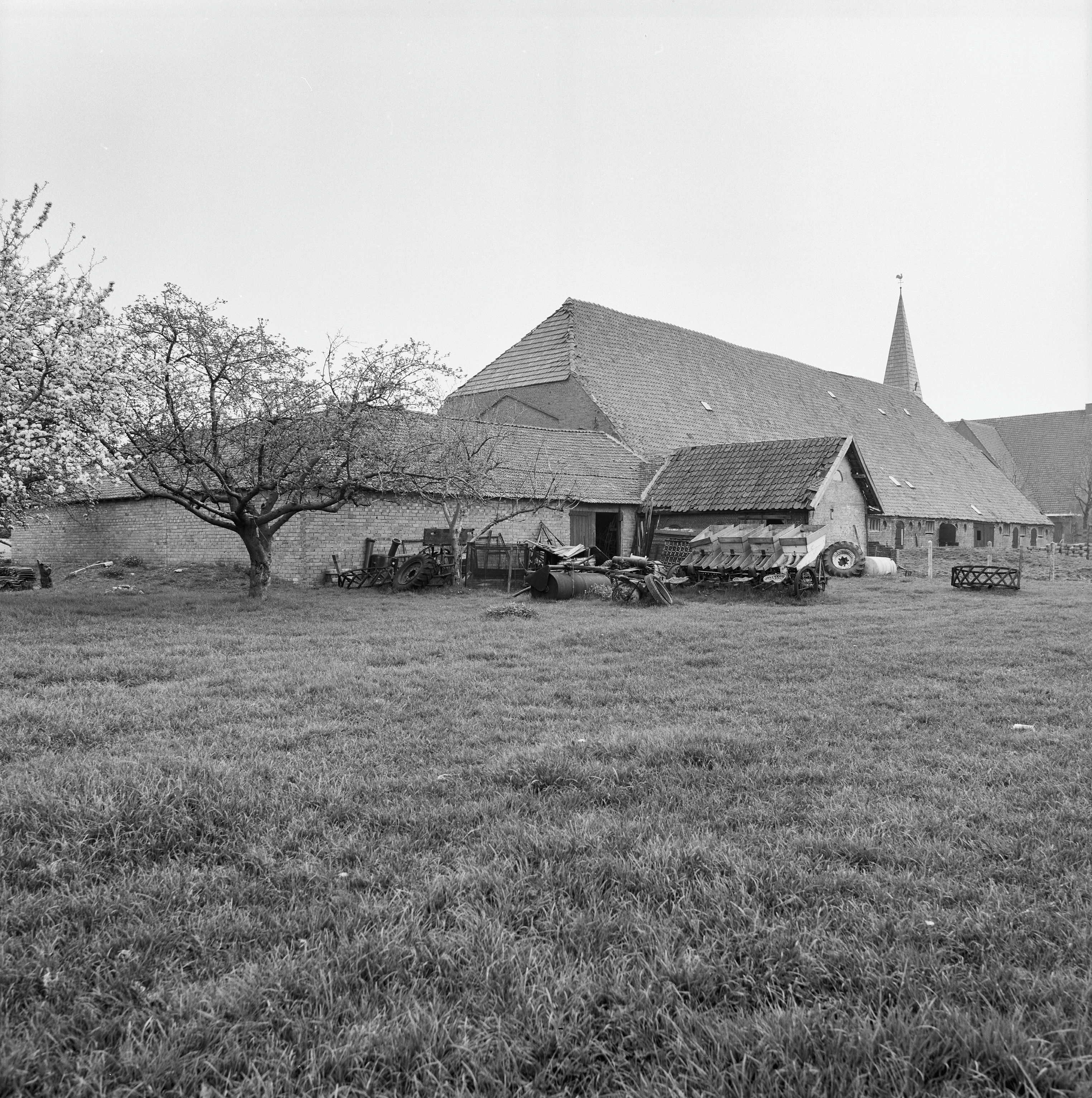
Overzicht achterzijde - Rilland-Bath - 20188382 - RCE

Rilland-Bath is a former municipality in the Dutch province of Zeeland.

It was created from a merger of Rilland and Bath in 1878, and existed until 1970 when it merged into the municipality Reimerswaal. The seat of the municipality was in Rilland.

== Transportation ==
- Railway station: Rilland-Bath
