= Nooitgedacht (Arnemuiden) =

Windmill in Zeeland, the Netherlands

Nooitgedacht, Arnemuiden
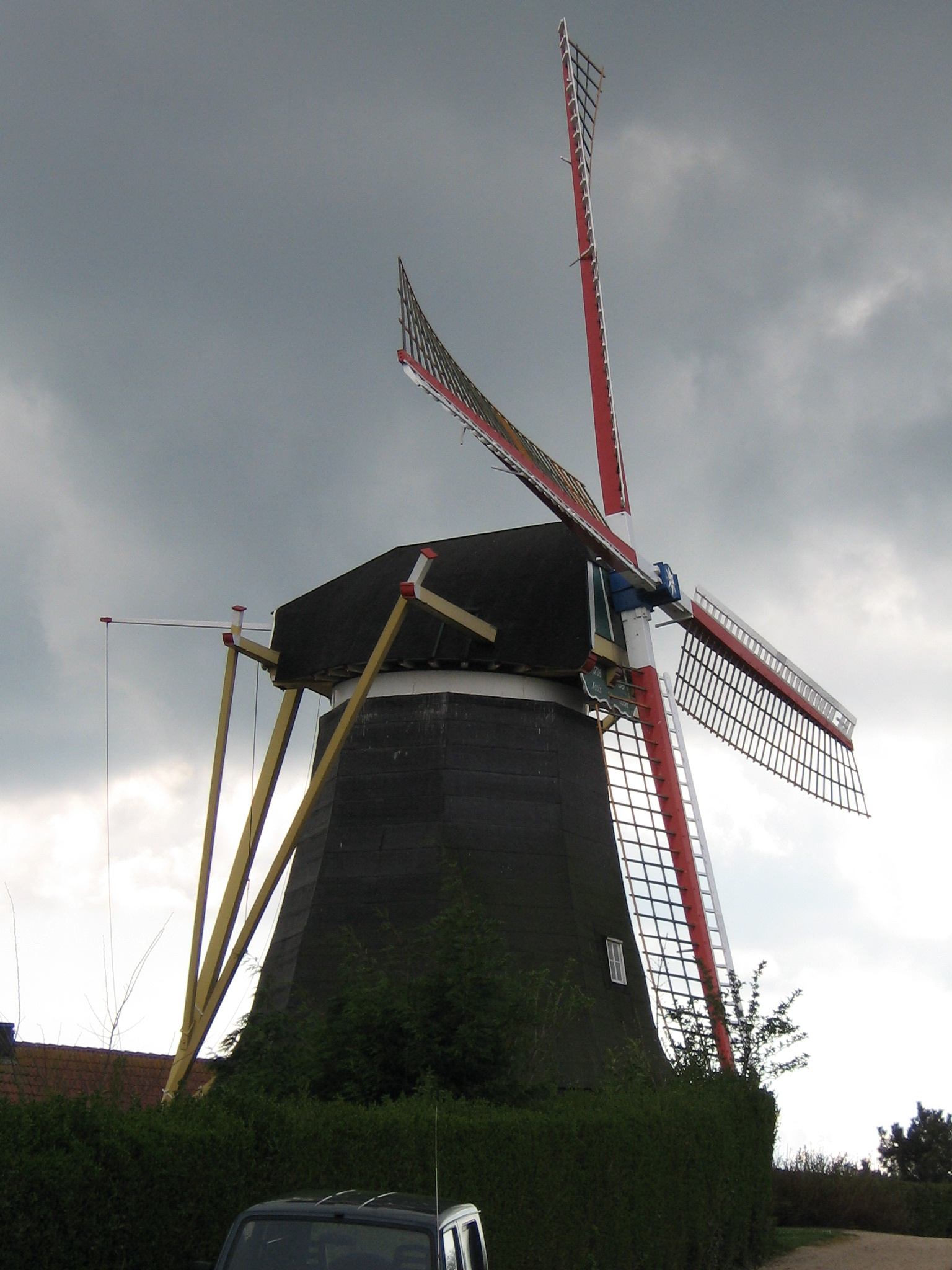
- Interactive map of Nooitgedacht, Arnemuiden

Origin
- Mill name: Nooitgedacht
- Mill location: Arnemuiden
- Coordinates: 51.500278°N 3.667778°E
- Year built: 1981

Information
- Purpose: Gristmill
- Type: Octagonal windmill

Nooitgedacht is a wooden octagonal windmill in Zeeuwse Arnemuiden in the Dutch municipality of Middelburg. The windmill was built in 1981 as a replacement for a windmill was built in 1736 but burned down in 1977.

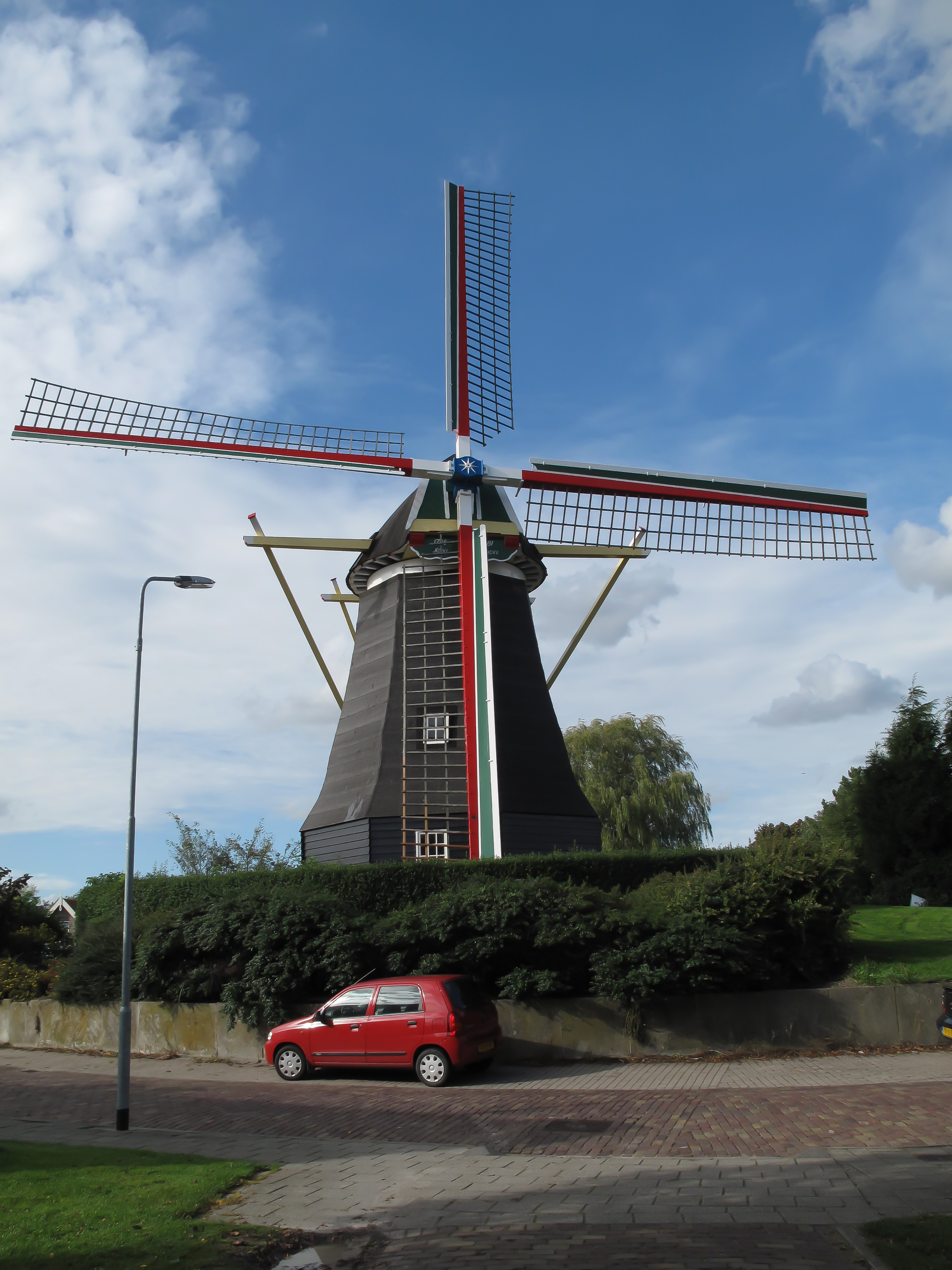
Nooitgedacht windmill
