= De Hoed =

Windmill in Waarde, Netherlands

Coordinates: 51°25′29″N 4°04′22″E

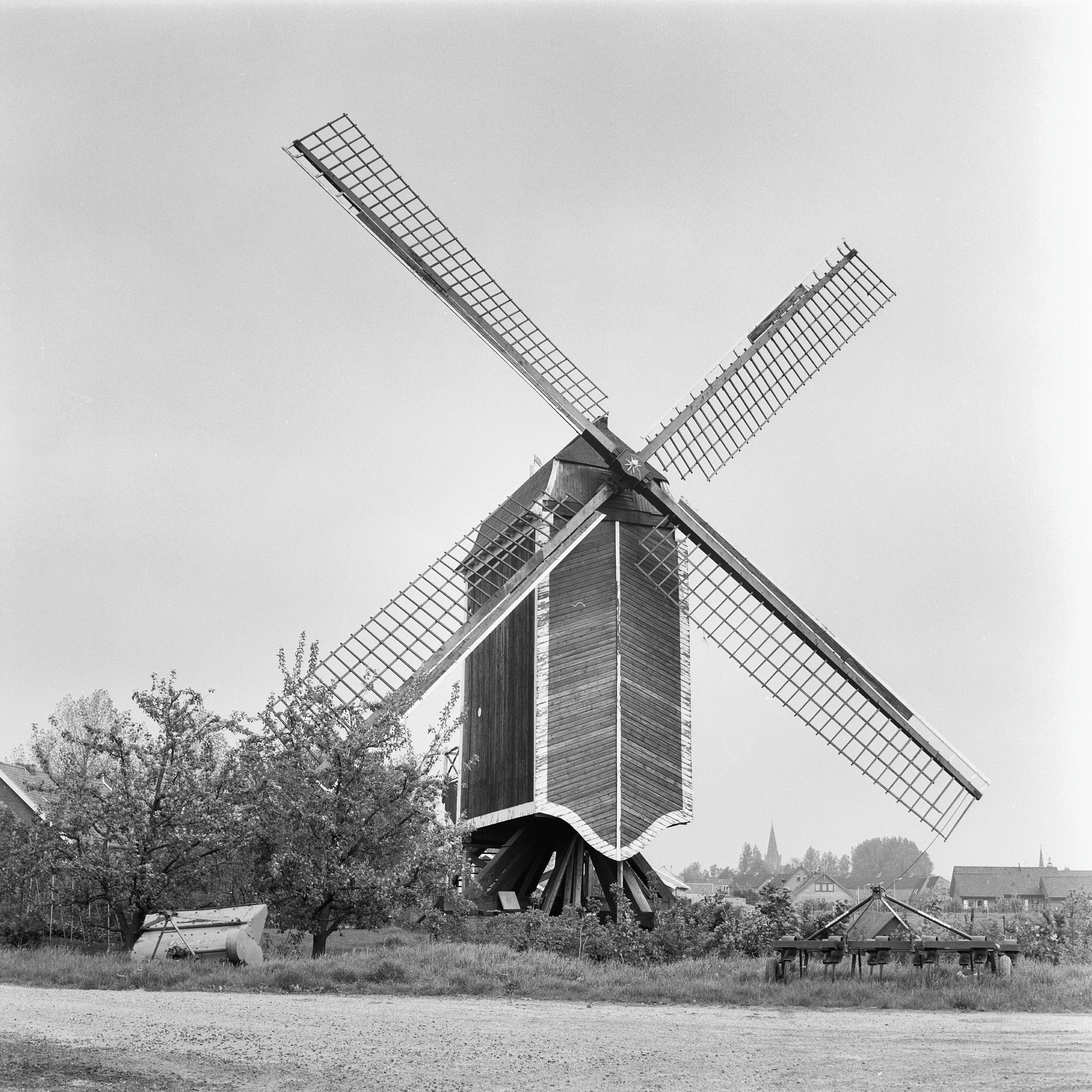
The exterior of the mill in 1984.

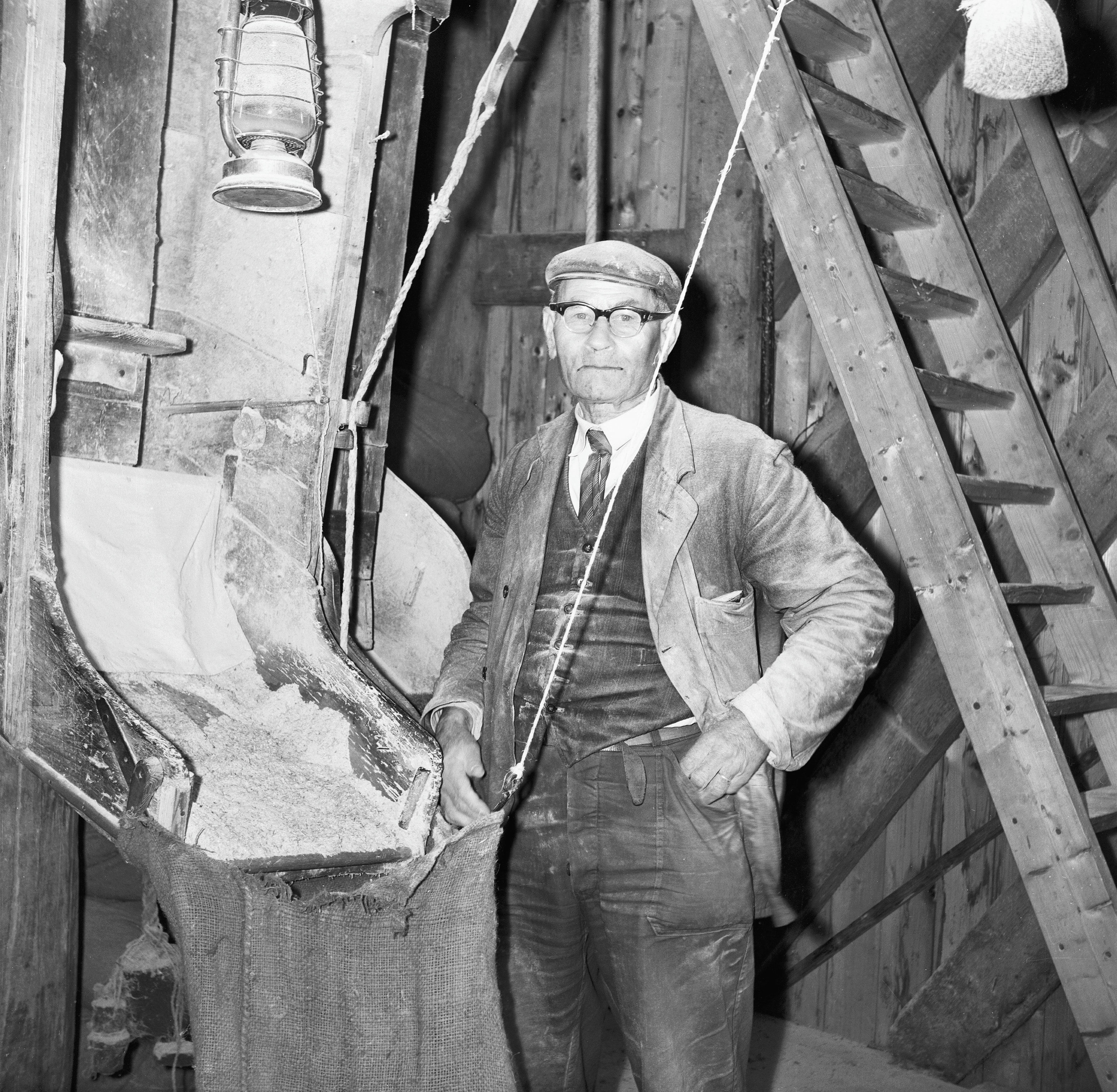
The miller at work, 1969

The De Hoed Mill is a post mill in Waarde, Netherlands. The structure was originally built as an oil mill in the town of Ghent in 1550, and was converted to a corn mill in the late 17th century. The mill was moved to its current location in 1989.

The windmill is listed as a protected structure under rijksmonument number 32419.
