= List of windmills in Limburg (Belgium) =

A list of windmills in the Belgian province of Limburg.

Location	Name of mill	Type	Built	Notes	Photograph
Achel	De Tomp	Grondzeiler	Early 15th century	Molenechos (in Dutch)	
Beringen	Dompas	Grondzeiler		Onroerend Erfgoed (in Dutch)	
Bilzen	Moulin de Moppertig	Achtkante molen		Onroerend Erfgoed (in Dutch)	
Boorsem	Stormvogel	Bergmolen	1858	Molenechos (in Dutch)	
Bree	Molen Buys	Bergmolen			
Dilsen	De Wachter	Bergmolen	1871	Molenechos (in Dutch)	
Eksel	Stermolen	Staakmolen	1901	Molenechos (in Dutch)	
Elen (Belgium)	De Hoop	Stellingmolen	1870	Molenechos (in Dutch)	
Genk	Galgenmolen	Achtkante Molen	1954	Molenechos (in Dutch)	
Genk	Standerdmolen van Millegem	Staakmolen	1955	Molenechos (in Dutch)	
Hamont	Napoleonsmolen; Marthijsemolen; Van Breemolen	Stellingmolen	1804	Molenechos (in Dutch)	
Kaulille	Sevensmolen	Grondzeiler	1891	Molenechos (in Dutch)	
Kinrooi	Lemmensmolen	Bergmolen	1856	Molenechos (in Dutch)	
Kortessem	Molen van Vliermaal	Bergmolen	1857	Onroerend Erfgoed (in Dutch)	
Leopoldsburg	Bergmolen; Molen van 't Kamp; Molen Bermindt	Bergmolen	1846	Molenechos (in Dutch)	
Leut	Nieuw Leven; De Wachter	Staakmolen	1801	Molenechos (in Dutch)	
Lommel	Leyssensmolen; Kattenbossermolen	Staakmolen	1963	Molenechos (in Dutch)	
Mechelen-aan-de-Maas	Kruiskenmolen; Nooit Gedacht	Bergmolen	1884	Molenechos (in Dutch)	
Molenbeersel	Keijersmolen	Bergmolen	1869	Molenechos (in Dutch)	
Molenbeersel	Zorgvlietmolen; Truyensmolen	Beltmolen	1919	Molenechos (in Dutch)	
Ophoven	Korenbloem	Bergmolen	1806	Molenechos (in Dutch)	
Overpelt	Sevensmolen	Staakmolen	1853	Molenechos (in Dutch)	
Overpelt	Leyssens Molen	Bergmolen	1899	Molenechos (in Dutch)	
Riemst		Bergmolen		Onroerend Erfgoed (in Dutch)	
Sint-Huibrechts-Lille	De Lilse Molen; De Nieuwe Molen	Bergmolen	1908	Molenechos (in Dutch)	
Tessenderlo	Oude Molen	Staakmolen	1728	Molenechos (in Dutch)	
Tessenderlo	Engbergse Molen	Bergmolen	1826	Molenechos (in Dutch)	
Tessenderlo	Schaliënmolen	Achkante molen	1830	Onroerend Erfgoed (in Dutch)	

== Notes ==
Bold indicates a mill that is still standing. Italics indicates a mill with some remains surviving.
