= List of windmills in Limburg (Netherlands) =

List of windmills in Limburg, Netherlands

A list of windmills in the Dutch province of Limburg.

Location	Name of mill	Type	Built	Notes	Photograph
Afferden	Nooit Gedacht	Beltmolen	1958	Molendatabase (in Dutch)	
Baexem	Aurora	Standerdmolen	1845	Molendatabase (in Dutch)	
Beegden	Sint Lindert; Molen van Niessen	Standerdmolen	1856	Molendatabase (in Dutch)	
Beek-Klein Genhout	Sint Hubertus	Standerdmolen	1801	Molendatabase (in Dutch)	
Beesel	De Grauwe Beer	Beltmolen	1891	Molendatabase (in Dutch). Built at Zaandam, moved to Beesel in 1891.	
Bemelen-Wolfshuis	Van Tienhovenmolen	Beltmolen	1855	Molendatabase (in Dutch)	
Gennep	De Reus	Beltmolen	1847	Molendatabase (in Dutch)	
Heijen-Diekendaal	Gerardsmolen	Beltmolen	1950	Molendatabase (in Dutch). Built at Engwirden, Friesland in 1850, moved to Hierden, Gelderland in 1913, moved here in 1950.	
Heythuysen-Areven	Sint Antonius	Beltmolen	1861	Molendatabase (in Dutch)	
Horn	De Hoop	Beltmolen	1817	Molendatabase (in Dutch)	
Horn	De Welvaart	Beltmolen	1865	Molendatabase (in Dutch)	
Kessel	Sint Antoniusmolen	Standerdmolen	1878	Molendatabase (in Dutch)	
Maasbracht	Leonardusmolen	Beltmolen	1867	Molendatabase (in Dutch)	
Maastricht	Torenmolen van Gronsveld	Beltmolen	1623	Molendatabase (in Dutch)	
Melick	Prins Bernhard	Standerdmolen	1999	Molendatabase (in Dutch)	
Merselo	Nooit Gedacht	Beltmolen	1867	Molendatabase (in Dutch)	
Meterik	Eendracht maakt Macht	Beltmolen	1899	Molendatabase (in Dutch)	
Nederweert-Kreijel	Sint Joseph	Beltmolen	1840	Molendatabase (in Dutch)	
Nederweert-Roeven	Windlust	Beltmolen	1872	Molendatabase (in Dutch)	
Nuth	Molen van Hunnecum	Beltmolen	1882	Molendatabase (in Dutch)	
Oirsbeek	Janssenmolen	Beltmolen	1883	Molendatabase (in Dutch)	
Ospel	De Korenbloem	beltmolen	1870	Molendatabase (in Dutch)	
Ottersum	Rust na Arbeid	Beltmolen	1881	Molendatabase (in Dutch)	
Roggel-Nijken	Sint Petrus	Beltmolen	1901	Molendatabase (in Dutch)	
Sint Odiliënberg	Molen van Verbeek	Beltmolen	1883	Molendatabase (in Dutch)	
Stevensweert	Hompesche Molen	Stellingmolen	1722	Molendatabase (in Dutch)	
Stramproy	Molen van Nijs; De Nijverheid	Beltmolen	1903	Molendatabase (in Dutch)	
Stramproy	Sint Jan	Standerdmolen	1804	Molendatabase (in Dutch)	
Swartbroek	De Hoop	Stellingmolen	1905	Molendatabase (in Dutch)	
Ubachsberg	Op De Vrouweheide	Beltmolen	1858	Molendatabase (in Dutch)	
Urmond	Urmond Windmill	Standerdmolen	1805	Molendatabase (in Dutch)	
Venray	Sint Petrus	Beltmolen	1856	Molendatabase (in Dutch)	
Weert	Sint Oda	Beltmolen	1883	Molendatabase (in Dutch)	
Weert-Hushoven	Wilhelmus-Hubertus	Beltmolen	1904	Molendatabase (in Dutch)	
Weert-Keent	Sint Anna	Beltmolen	1911	Molendatabase (in Dutch)	
Weert-Laar	Sint Antonius	Beltmolen	1903	Molendatabase (in Dutch)	
Weert-Tungelroy	Sint Anna	Beltmolen	1875	Molendatabase (in Dutch)	
