= De Hollandsche Molen =

Dutch organization

Vereniging De Hollandsche Molen
- Founded: 15 May 1923
- Location: Amsterdam, Netherlands
- Region served: Netherlands
- Members: ca. 5000
- Key people: N. Papineau Salm (chairman)
- Website: www.molens.nl/

Vereniging De Hollandsche Molen (Dutch pronunciation: [vəˈreːnəɣɪŋ də ˈɦɔlɑntsə ˈmoːlə(n)]) (English: Dutch Windmill Association) is a Dutch organization founded in 1923 to preserve windmills in the Netherlands, to document them, and to restore them. Financial support comes from members and from grants by organizations such as the BankGiro Loterij (a Dutch lottery). Their website provides access to a database which documents some 1400 mills in the Netherlands; "Het Nederlands Molenbestand" is authoritative on the topic. The organization is often given credit for organizing a powerful and effective lobby aimed at procuring money from Dutch government institutions to fund restoration projects.

Its former president Frederik Stokhuyzen was one of the foremost scholars on Dutch windmills; a recently revised edition of his 1961 book Molens is still the standard book on the topic.

In 1981, Prince Claus of the Netherlands became the organization's patron, and attended ten ceremonies at which windmills were reopened; at his death in 2002 the 12 windmills owned and operated by the organization had their sails set in the "mourning position," with the lowest sail fixed and set slightly to the right. His son, Prince Friso of Orange-Nassau, became the next patron. In August 2014 former queen Beatrix of the Netherlands took over as patron from her son.
