= Gawege =

- Village
- Location in the province of Zeeland in the Netherlands Gawege (Netherlands)
- Coordinates: 51°25′7″N 4°6′11″E
- Country: Netherlands
- Province: Zeeland
- Municipality: Reimerswaal
- Time zone: UTC+1 (CET)
  - Summer (DST): UTC+2 (CEST)
- Postal code: 4414
- Dialing code: 0113

Gawege is a hamlet in the Dutch municipality of Reimerswaal. The hamlet lies on the road from Krabbendijke to Waarde. The hamlet was mentioned first in 1288.

Gawege is not a statistical entity, and the postal authorities have placed it under Waarde. The hamlet consists of about 30 houses.
