= Bert-Jan Ruissen =

Dutch politician

Bert-Jan Ruissen MEP
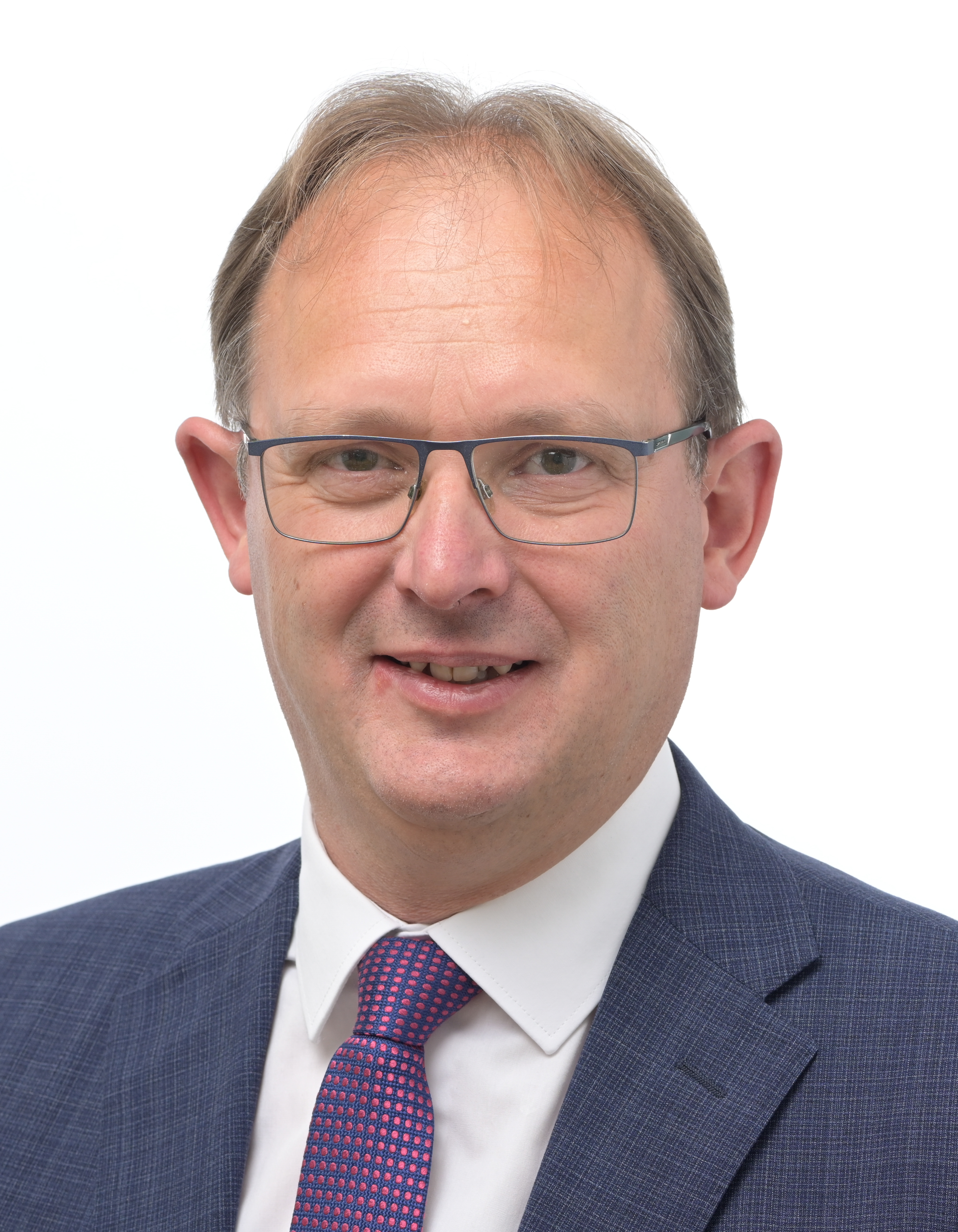
- Official portrait, 2024

Member of the European Parliament
- Incumbent
- Assumed office 2 July 2019
- Parliamentary group: European Conservatives and Reformists
- Constituency: Netherlands

Member of the Krimpen aan den IJssel City Council
- In office 7 March 2006 – 30 June 2019

Personal details
- Born: 22 March 1972 (age 54) Oostdijk, Netherlands
- Party: Reformed Political Party
- Other political affiliations: European Conservatives and Reformists Party
- Children: 4
- Education: Wageningen University & Research
- Occupation: Agricultural engineer • Politician
- Website: eurofractie.sgp.nl

Bert-Jan Ruissen (born 22 March 1972) is a Dutch politician and Member of the European Parliament (MEP) from the Netherlands. He is a member of the Reformed Political Party (SGP), part of the European Conservatives and Reformists (ECR).

Ruissen studied at Wageningen University and Research in the Netherlands. In 1995 he became assistant to MEP Leen van der Waal in the European Parliament. Later he worked as advisor for EU Agriculture Policy at the Ministry of Agriculture, Nature and Food Quality.

== Political career ==
Ruissen was elected to the local council of Krimpen aan den IJssel from 2006 until 2019. In the 2019 European Parliament election he was elected from the second place of a common list of Christian Union – Reformed Political Party. He became full Member of the European Parliament Committee on Agriculture and Rural Development, as well substitute Member of the European Parliament Committee on Fisheries and European Parliament Committee on Foreign Affairs. He also serves as first vice chair of the European Parliament delegation for the relations with Israel.

In his maiden speech in the European Parliament, in September 2019, he spoke out against patents on plant characteristics.

As a member of the European Parliament, he voted against the new European Commission of president Ursula von der Leyen, because he considered her programme to be too federalist. Later he also voted against the resolution to denounce the LGBT-free zones in Poland, because the resolution called on EU Member States to recognise same-sex marriage. He has also signed a declaration against surrogacy. Ruissen in 2019 was one of the Members of the European Parliament visiting Taiwan, expressing support. In January 2020 he voted against the European Green Deal, proposed by EU commissioner Frans Timmermans, saying in his view the proposal is unrealistic.

He was the SGP's lead candidate in the June 2024 European Parliament election, when that party no longer shared a list with the Christian Union. The SGP secured one seat, and Ruissen was re-elected. He serves as the ECR Group's chief whip.

== Personal life ==
Ruissen was born in Reimerswaal.

Bert-Jan Ruissen is married and has four children.

== Electoral history ==
Electoral history of Bert-Jan Ruissen
Year	Body	Party	Pos.	Votes	Result		Ref.
Year	Body	Party	Pos.	Votes	Party seats	Individual	Ref.
2024	European Parliament	Reformed Political Party	1	194,433	1	Won	
