= Oostdijk, Zeeland =

Oostdijk
- Village
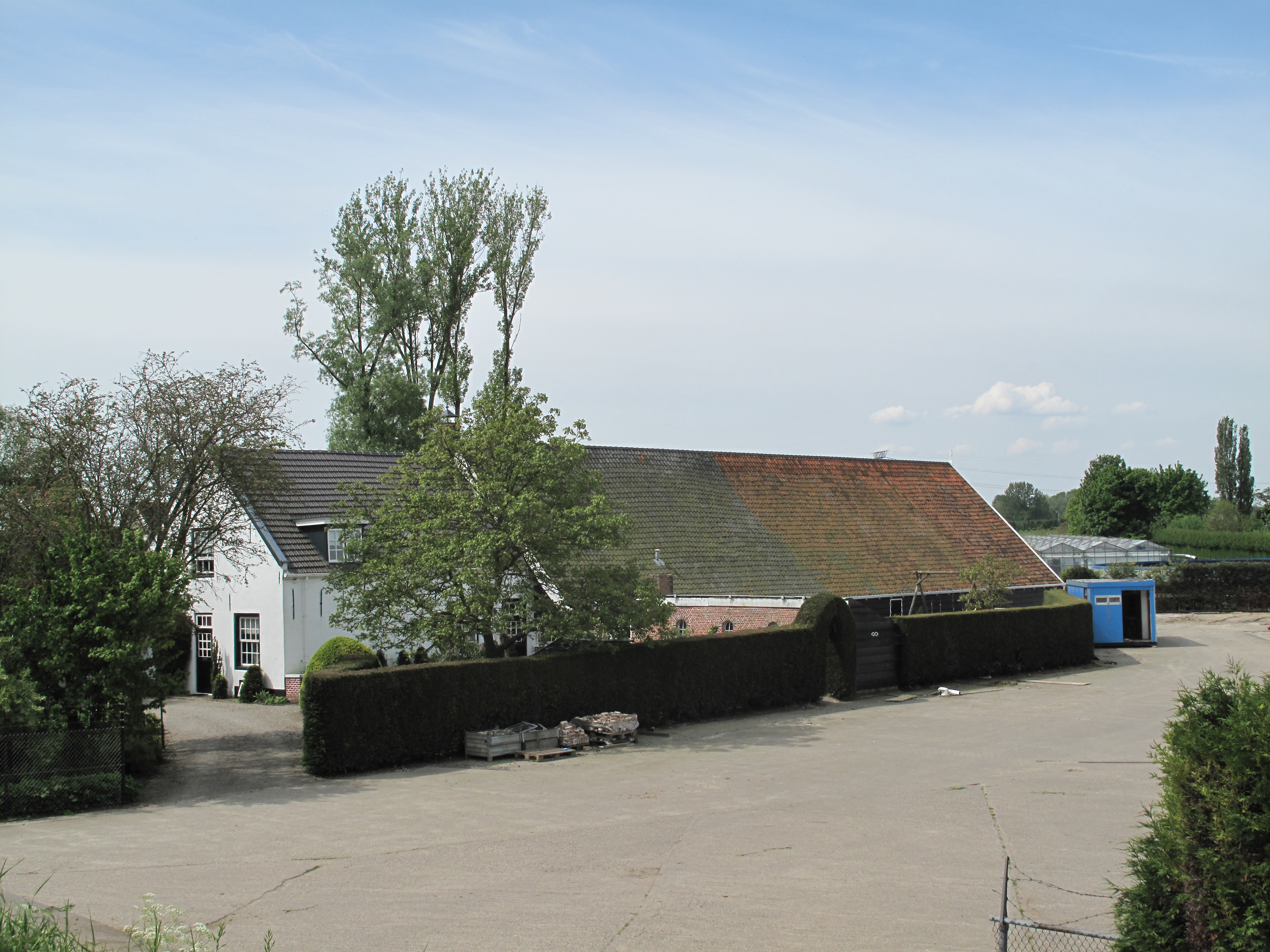
- Farm in Oostdijk

- Location in the province of Zeeland in the Netherlands Oostdijk (Netherlands)
- Coordinates: 51°26′35″N 4°4′48″E
- Country: Netherlands
- Province: Zeeland
- Municipality: Reimerswaal

Area
  - Total: 1.58 km^{2} (0.61 sq mi)
- Elevation: 0.7 m (2.3 ft)

Population (2021)
  - Total: 610
  - Density: 390/km^{2} (1,000/sq mi)
- Time zone: UTC+1 (CET)
  - Summer (DST): UTC+2 (CEST)
- Postal code: 4415
- Dialing code: 0113

Oostdijk is a village in the Dutch province of Zeeland. It is located in the municipality of Reimerswaal, about 3 km east of the town of Kruiningen.

The village was first mentioned in 1899 as Oostdijk, and means eastern dike.

Oostdijk was home to 209 people in 1840. The village used to be part of the municipality of Krabbendijke. It was flooded during the North Sea flood of 1953, and six people died. In 1970, it was merged into the municipality Reimerswaal.
