= Colpaert =

Colpaert is a surname. Notable people with the surname include:

- Alfred Colpaert, Dutch professor of physical geography
- Carl Colpaert (born 1958), American film director
- Dick Colpaert (born 1943), American baseball player
- Gustave Colpaert, Belgian wrestler
- Steve Colpaert (born 1986), Belgian footballer
