= Hansweert =

- Village
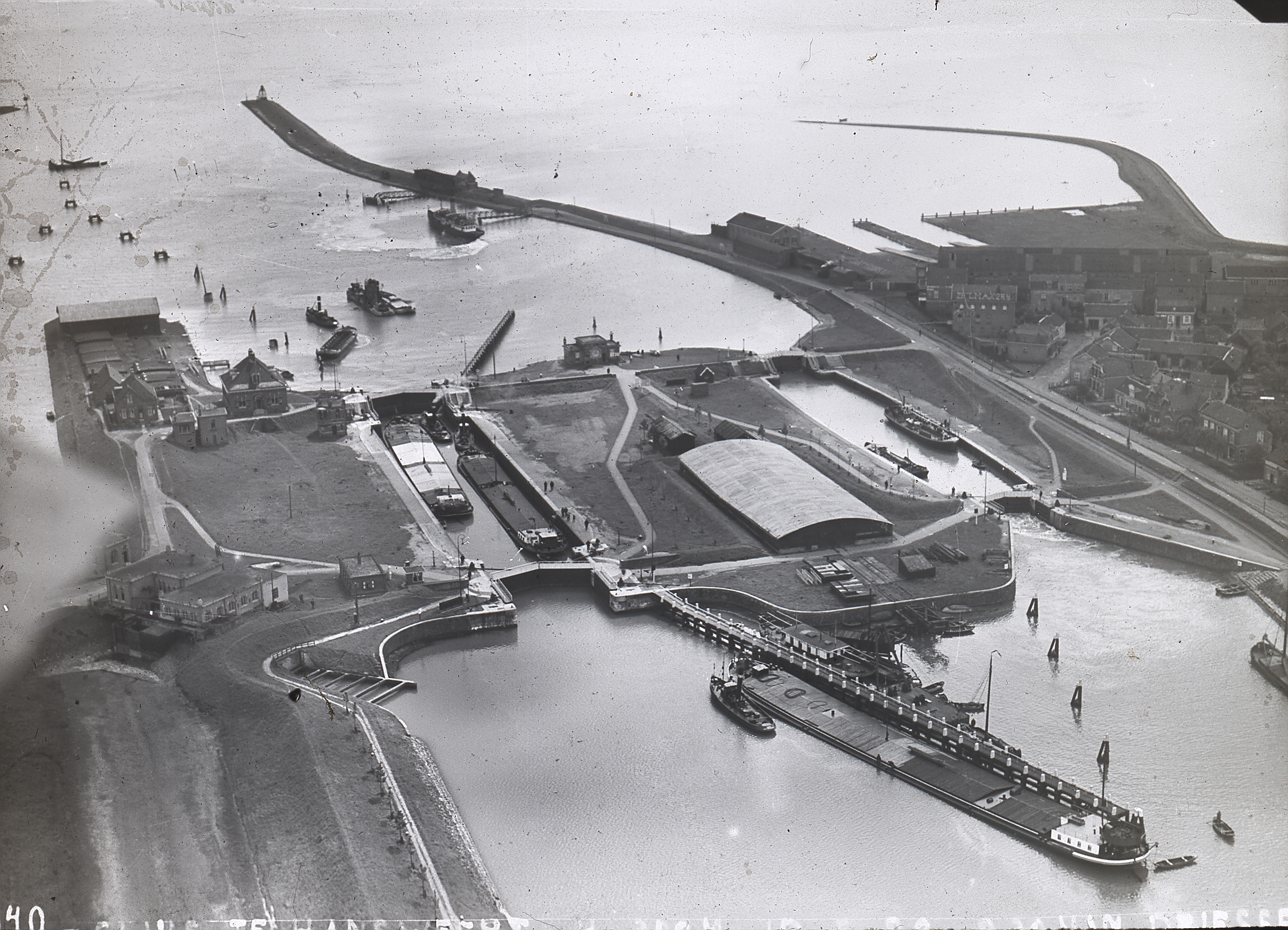
- Aerial photograph of Hansweert

- Coat of arms

- Location in the province of Zeeland in the Netherlands Hansweert (Netherlands)
- Coordinates: 51°26′56″N 4°0′11″E
- Country: Netherlands
- Province: Zeeland
- Municipality: Reimerswaal

Area
  - Total: 5.03 km^{2} (1.94 sq mi)
- Elevation: 0.9 m (3.0 ft)

Population (2021)
  - Total: 1,675
  - Density: 333/km^{2} (862/sq mi)
- Time zone: UTC+1 (CET)
  - Summer (DST): UTC+2 (CEST)
- Postal code: 4417
- Dialing code: 0113

Hansweert is a village in the southwest Netherlands. It is located on the Zuid-Beveland peninsula, in the municipality of Reimerswaal, Zeeland.

== History ==
The first mention of what is later called Hansweert is made in 1353. Variants of the name include Hannekinswaerde, Hannekijnswaard, and Hanzwartz; the last of those is probably the source for the modern variant Answest. For a long time, Hansweert was a small, agrarian community. It was notable only for the Hansweert-Walsoorden ferry, which dates from the 16th century and connects Hansweert in Zuid-Beveland to Walsoorden in Zeelandic Flanders.

In 1866, however, when the Canal through Zuid-Beveland opened up, the village flourished. The canal ran right through the middle of the village (dividing it into eastern and western parts) where sluices were located, bringing commercial traffic with it. Hansweert in those days knew a disproportionately large number of bakeries, butchers, and cafes, and came to be called "Small Antwerp".

For a long time, Hansweert was an important stop on the shortest shipping route between the busy ports of Rotterdam and Antwerp, but all that changed when the Scheldt–Rhine Canal opened up and became the quicker route. Hansweert's economy collapsed, and so did the village. The eastern part of the village was torn down to make way for a harbor. Additional renovation moved the canal further from the village.

In 2010, Hansweert had a population of 1685. While the village has declined since the opening of the Scheldt–Rhine Canal, there is still an active community. In 2005, the old ferry to Perkpolder was restored; it now sails during the summer months for bicyclists and pedestrians.

== Events ==
- Answester Dweildag: an event where a few dweilbands give a concert on different places through the village; it is on the last Sunday of September.
- Cycle race of Hansweert: an annual event on the last Saturday of August.

== Gallery ==
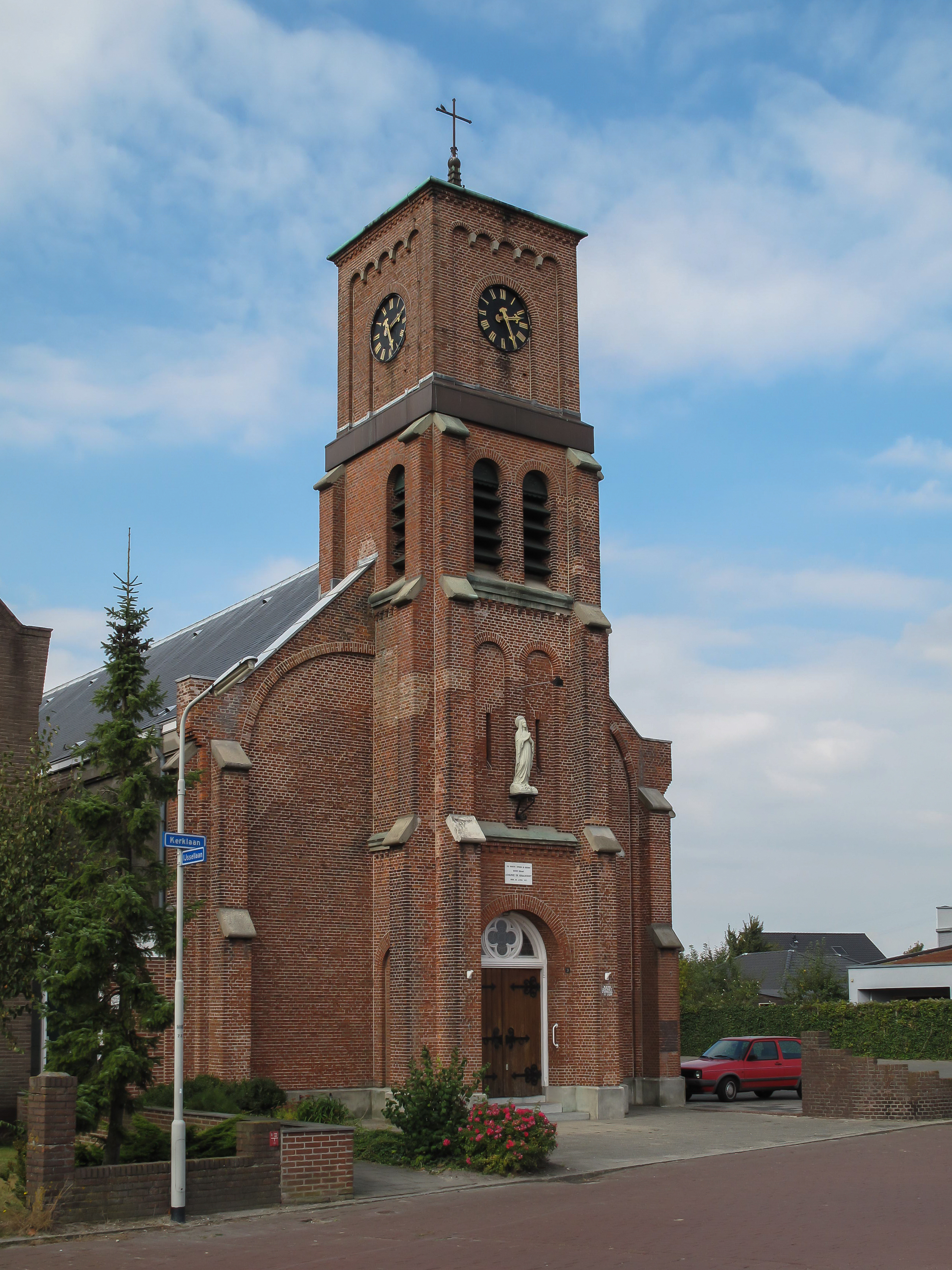
Onze-Lieve-Vrouw Onbevlekt Ontvangen church in Hansweert

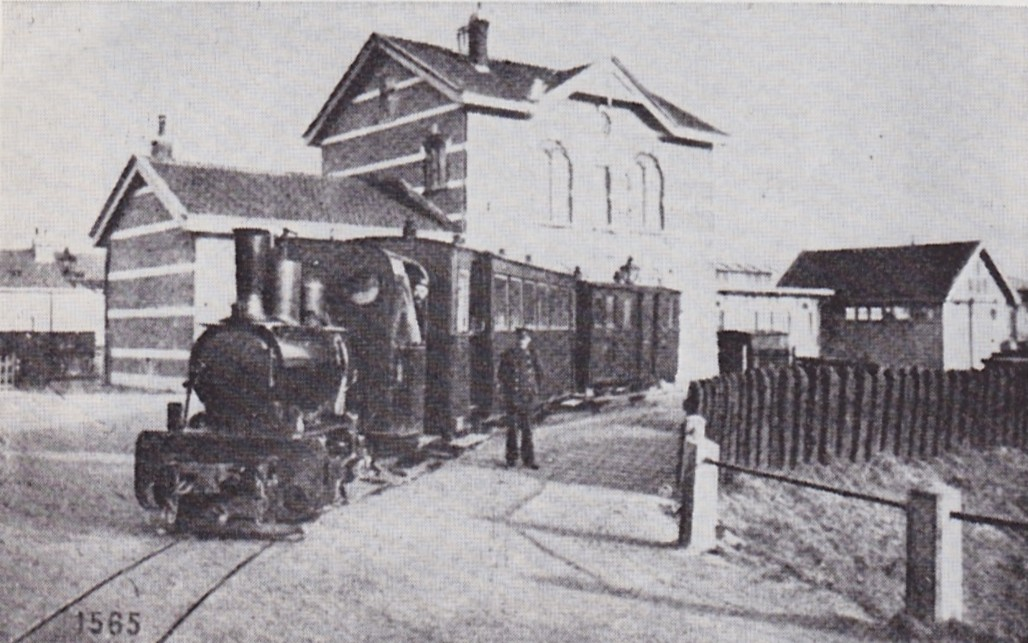
Decauville tramway between Hansweert and Vlake

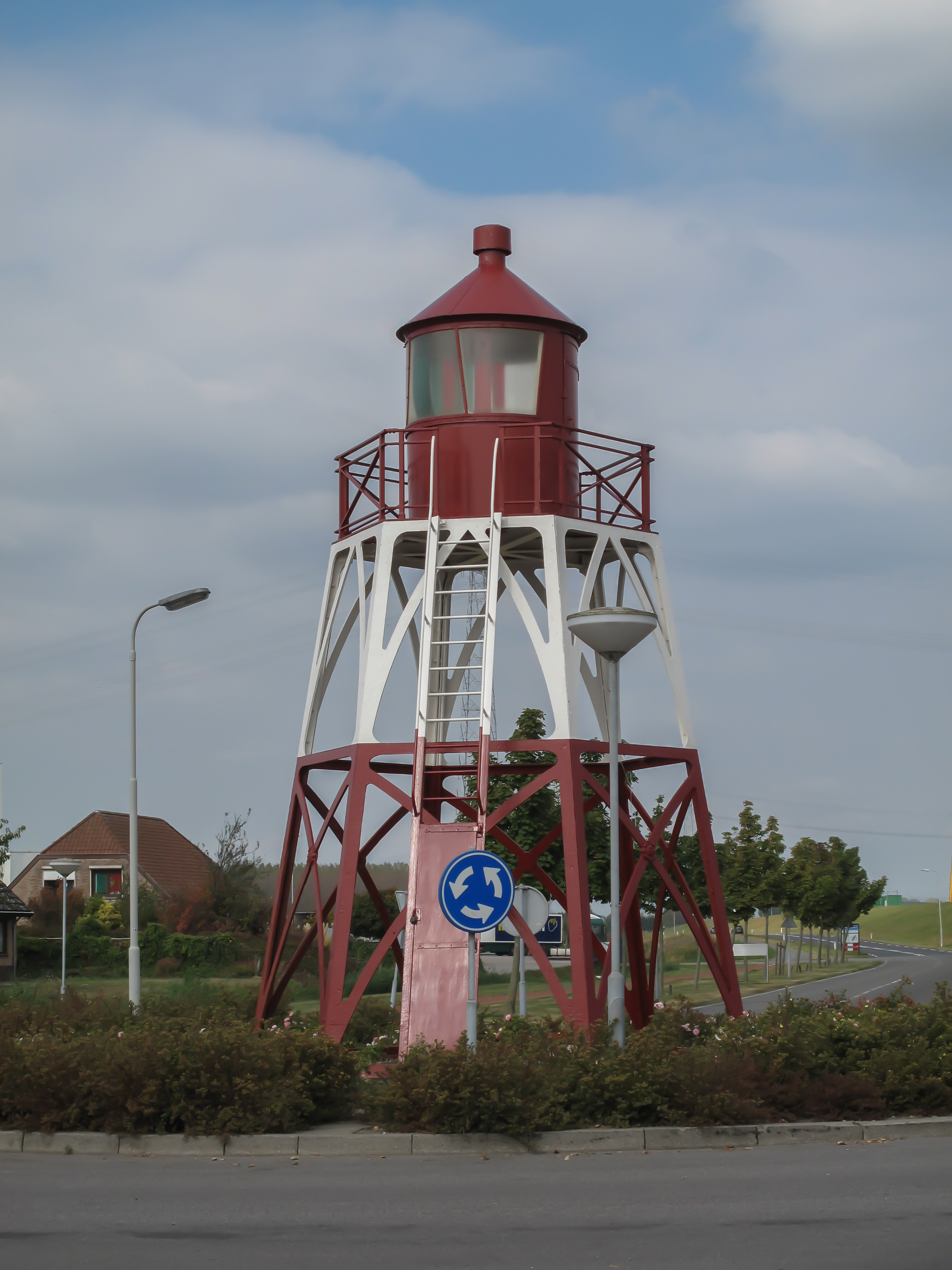
Roundabot in Hansweert
