= Vlake =

- Hamlet
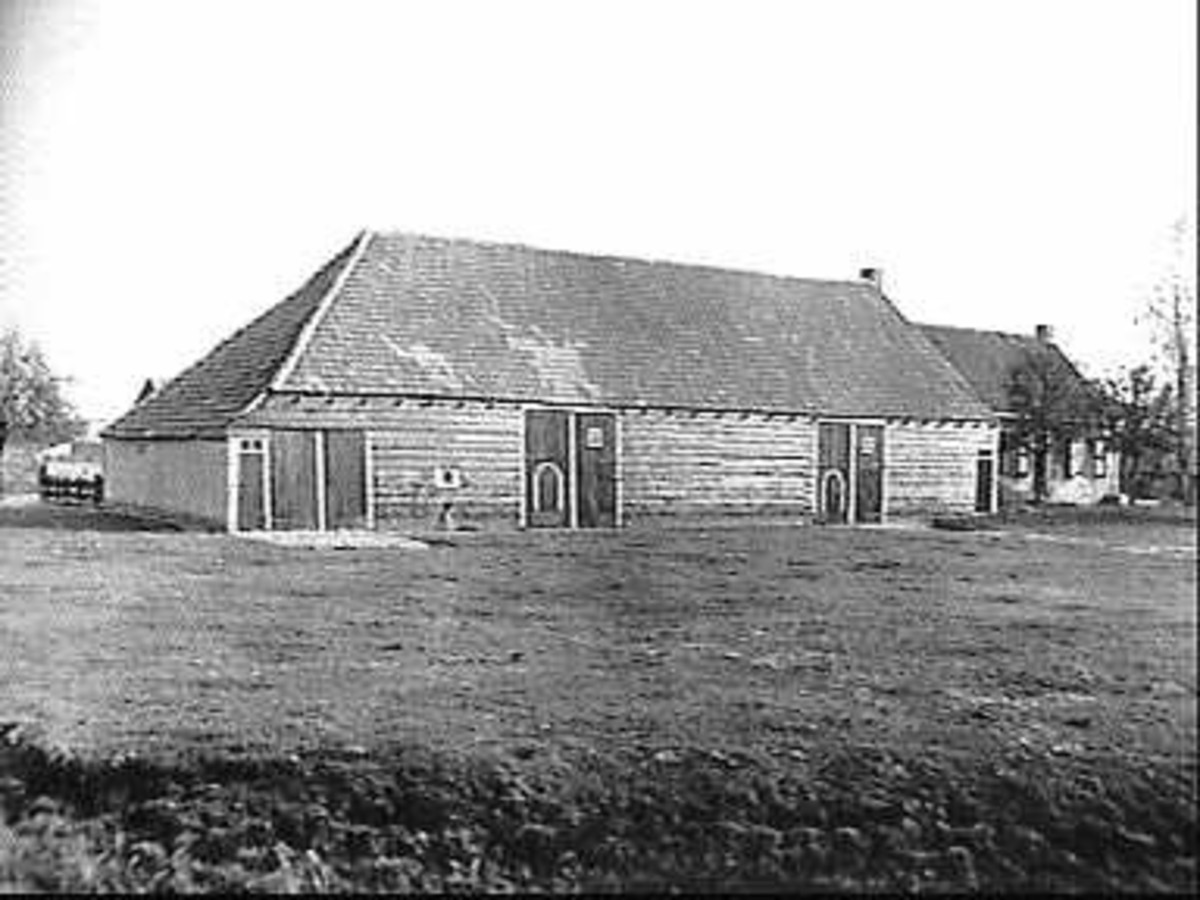
- Farm in Vlake

- Location in the province of Zeeland in the Netherlands Vlake (Netherlands)
- Coordinates: 51°28′25″N 4°0′28″E
- Country: Netherlands
- Province: Zeeland
- Municipality: Reimerswaal
- Time zone: UTC+1 (CET)
  - Summer (DST): UTC+2 (CEST)
- Postal code: 4401
- Dialing code: 0113

Vlake is a hamlet in the Dutch municipality of Reimerswaal. The Vlaketunnel carries the A58 motorway under the canal through Zuid-Beveland.

Vlake is not a statistical entity, and the postal authorities have placed it under Yerseke.

Vlake used to have a church, but it was demolished and a large part of the village was demolished in 1802 for the construction of the canal through Zuid-Beveland.
