= Oude molen (Kruiningen) =

Windmill in Yerseke, Netherlands

Coordinates: 51°26′43″N 4°02′30″E

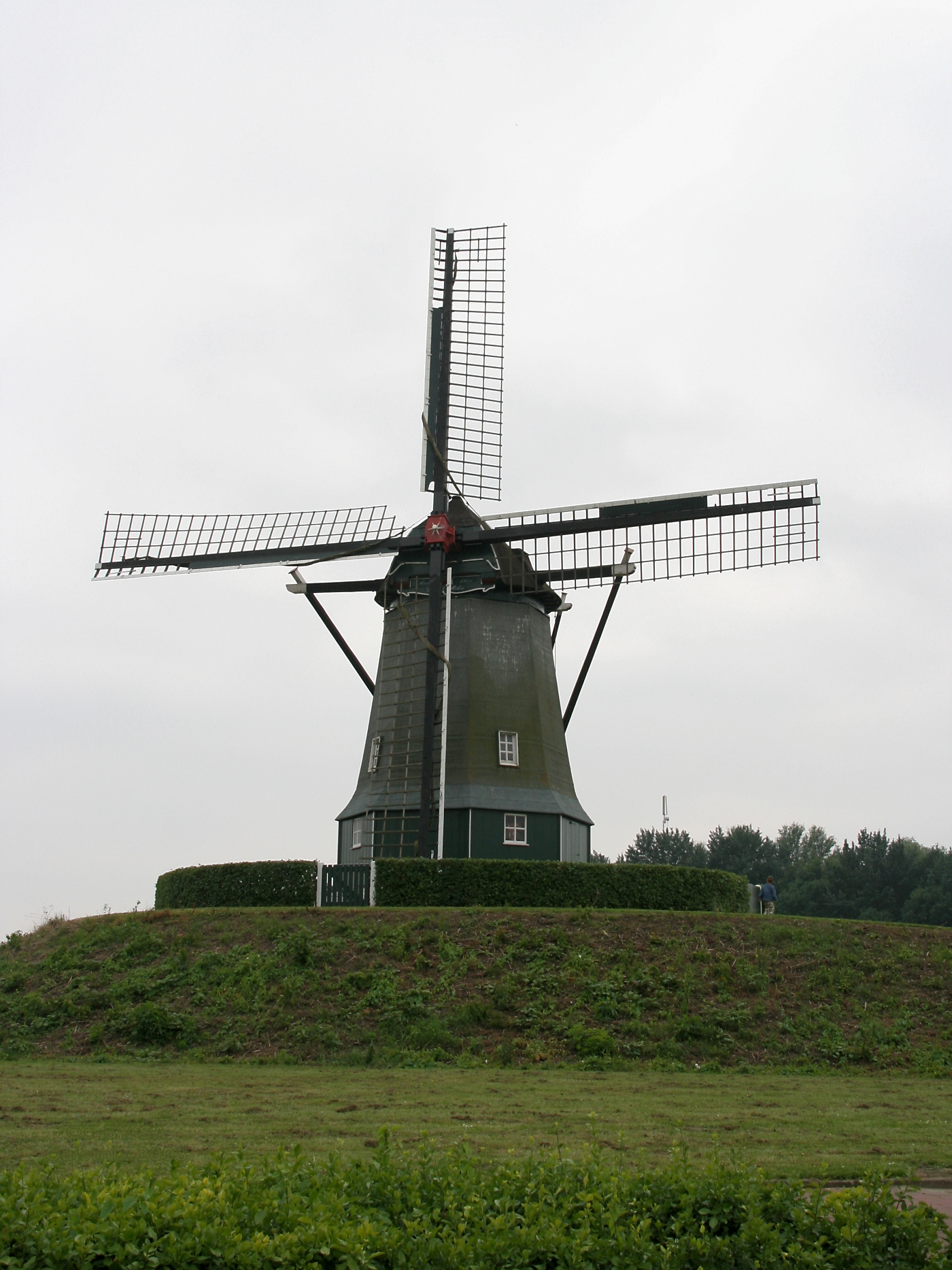
The Oude Molen

The Oude molen (''Old Mill'' in Dutch) is a windmill in Kruiningen in the Dutch province of Zeeland.

The windmill was built in 1801 and remained in operation until 1953. In 1959 it was purchased by the municipality. Between 1964 and 1965, and between 1986 and 1992, the mill was completely restored. In 2001 the mill as a whole was moved slightly after the windage on the old spot was affected. A voluntary miller, the mill is in operation regularly.

The rods of the mill are approximately 20.70 meters long and feature the traditional Dutch fencing with sails. The mill is equipped with two pairs of millstones.
