= Stationsbuurt =

- Hamlet
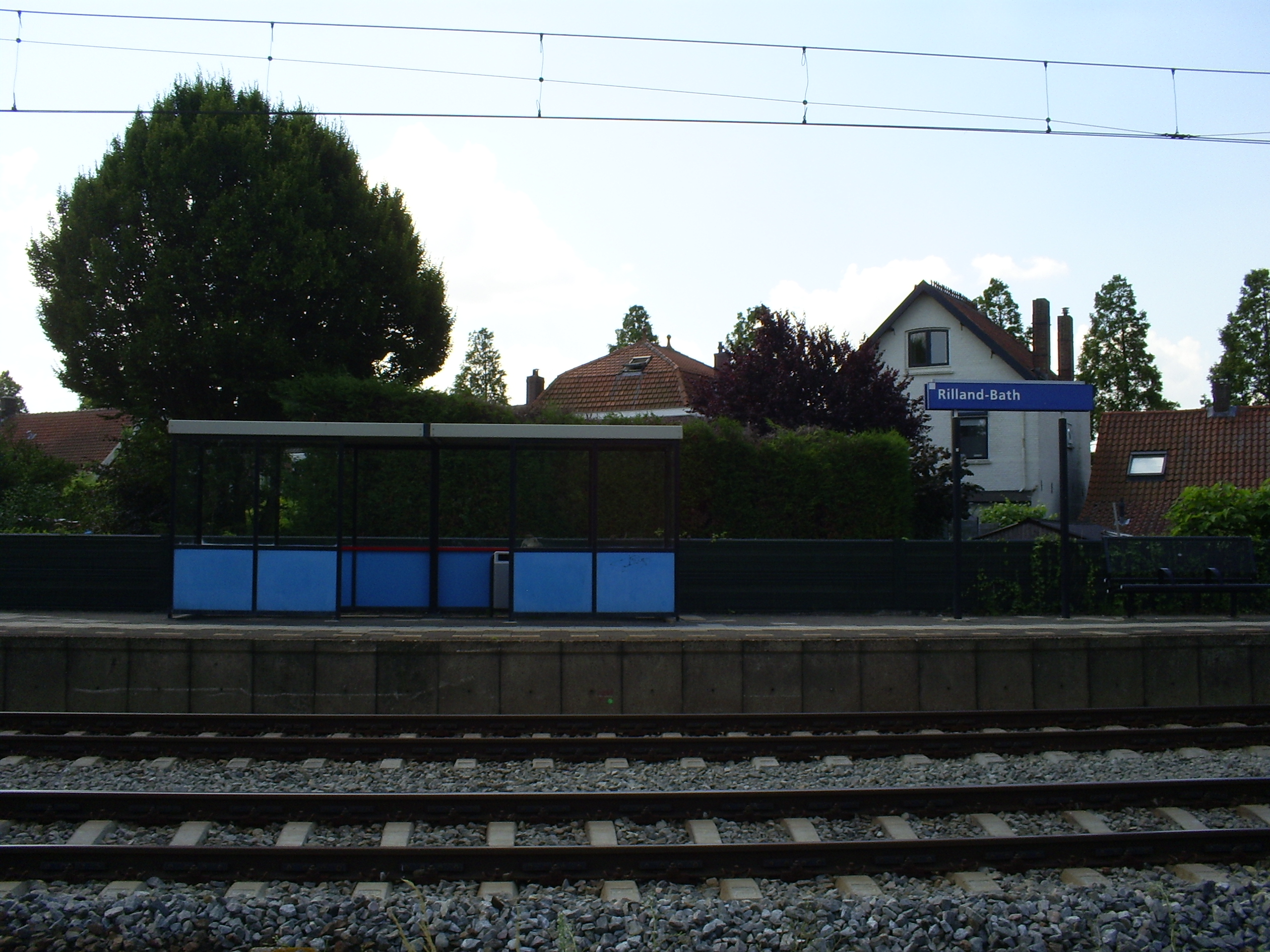
- Houses behind the station

- Location in the province of Zeeland in the Netherlands Stationsbuurt (Netherlands)
- Coordinates: 51°25′21″N 4°9′37″E
- Country: Netherlands
- Province: Zeeland
- Municipality: Reimerswaal

Area
  - Total: 0.25 km^{2} (0.097 sq mi)
- Elevation: 1.6 m (5.2 ft)

Population (2021)
  - Total: 170
  - Density: 680/km^{2} (1,800/sq mi)
- Time zone: UTC+1 (CET)
  - Summer (DST): UTC+2 (CEST)
- Postal code: 4411
- Dialing code: 0113

Stationsbuurt is a hamlet in the Dutch municipality of Reimerswaal. The hamlet is named after the Rilland-Bath railway station which is the reason for the existence of the hamlet.
