= Waarde =

- Village
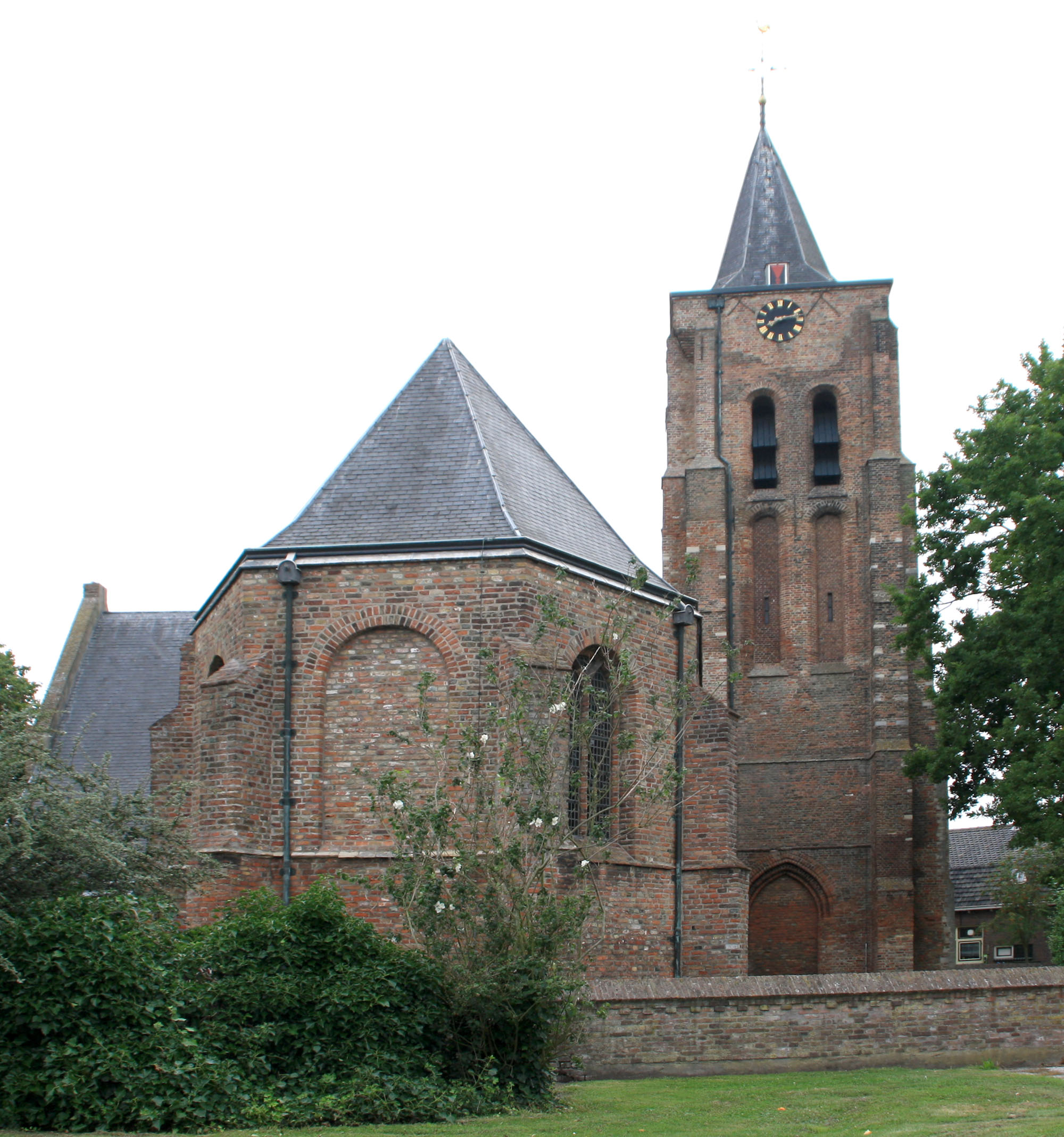
- The Dutch Reformed Church of Waarde

- Coat of arms

- Location in the province of Zeeland in the Netherlands Waarde (Netherlands)
- Coordinates: 51°25′6″N 4°3′59″E
- Country: Netherlands
- Province: Zeeland
- Municipality: Reimerswaal

Area
  - Total: 10.29 km^{2} (3.97 sq mi)
- Elevation: 0.1 m (0.33 ft)

Population (2021)
  - Total: 1,445
  - Density: 140.4/km^{2} (363.7/sq mi)
- Time zone: UTC+1 (CET)
  - Summer (DST): UTC+2 (CEST)
- Postal code: 4414
- Dialing code: 0113

Waarde is a village in the Dutch province of Zeeland. It is located in the municipality of Reimerswaal, about 4 km southeast of Kruiningen.

== History ==
The village was first mentioned in 1219 as Ward, and means "land near water". The original village was lost in a flood in 1530. A dike was built around the area in 1570.

The Dutch Reformed church is a single-aisled church with a tower in the corner. The tower dates from the late 14th century. The church was damaged by fire in 1589. It was restored in 1959. The grist mill De Hoed was originally built before 1550 in Ghent. In 1857, it was moved to Kruiningen. It was in operation until 1945 and then started to deteriorate. In 1989, it was moved and rebuilt at Waarde, and is back in operation.

Waarde was home to 590 people in 1840. In 1847, a little harbour was built in the Westerschelde. The former town hall was built in 1909 with Renaissance Revival and Jugendstil influences.

Waarde was a separate municipality until 1970 when it was merged into Reimerswaal.

On 15 January 2009, there were plans presented to the local council for a new project in Waarde. The project, called "meer Waarde" contains a new village centre, a new gym and building a connection between the two schools. The local council reacted positively and reserved €2 million for it.

== Gallery ==
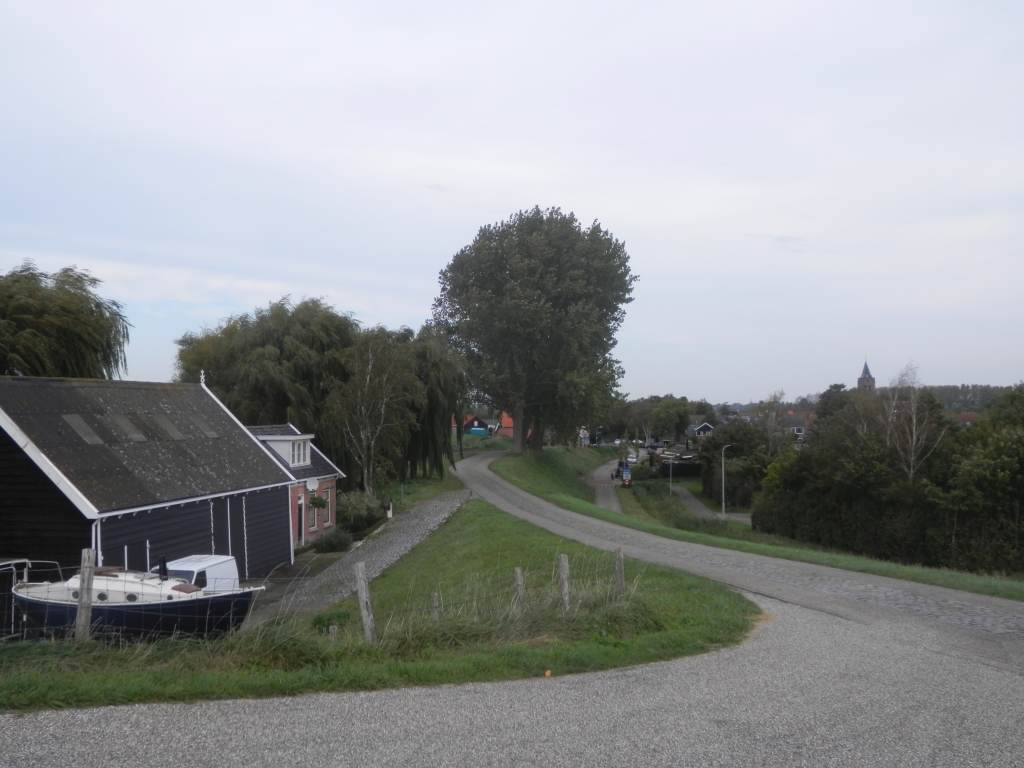
View on Waarde

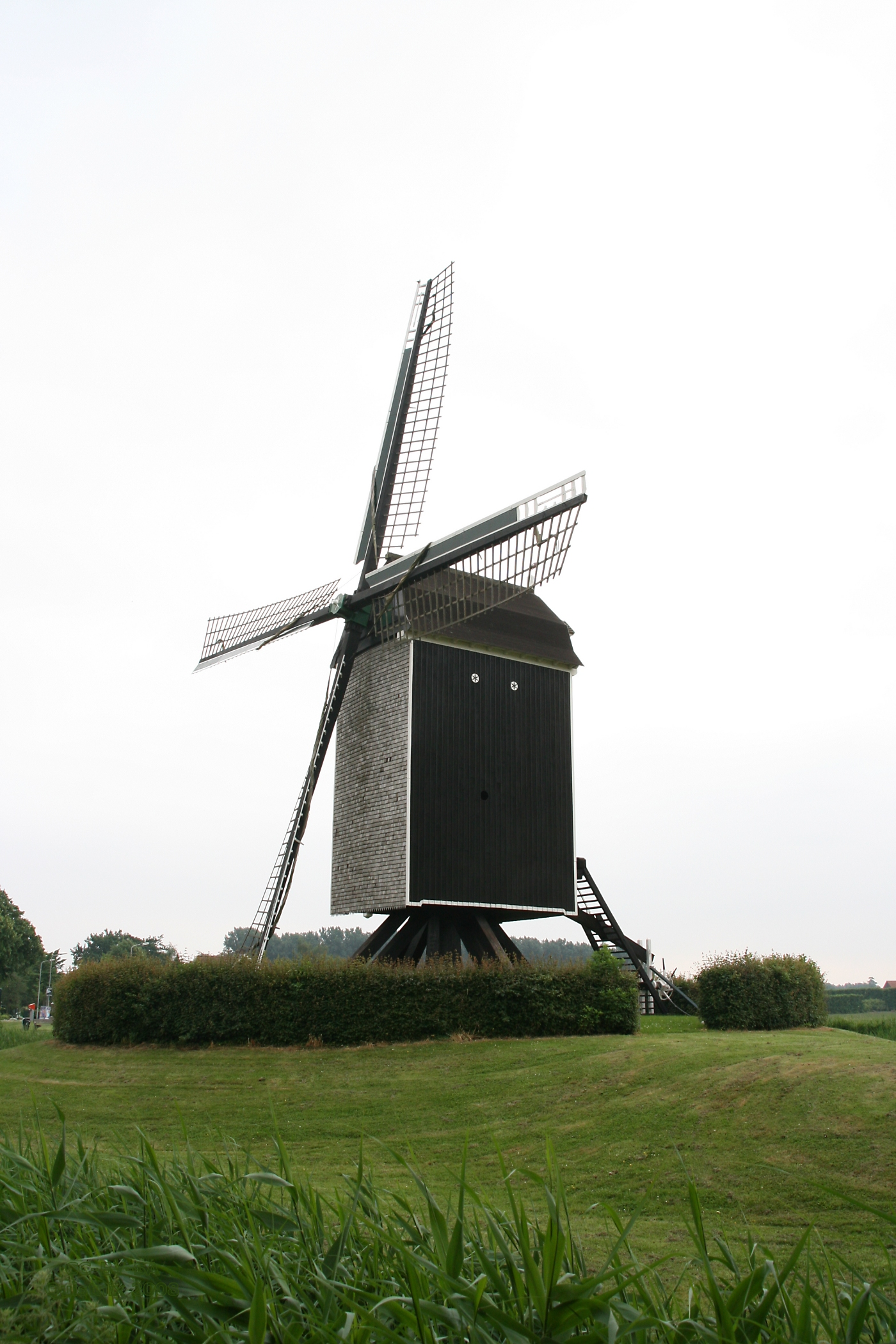
Wind mill De Hoed

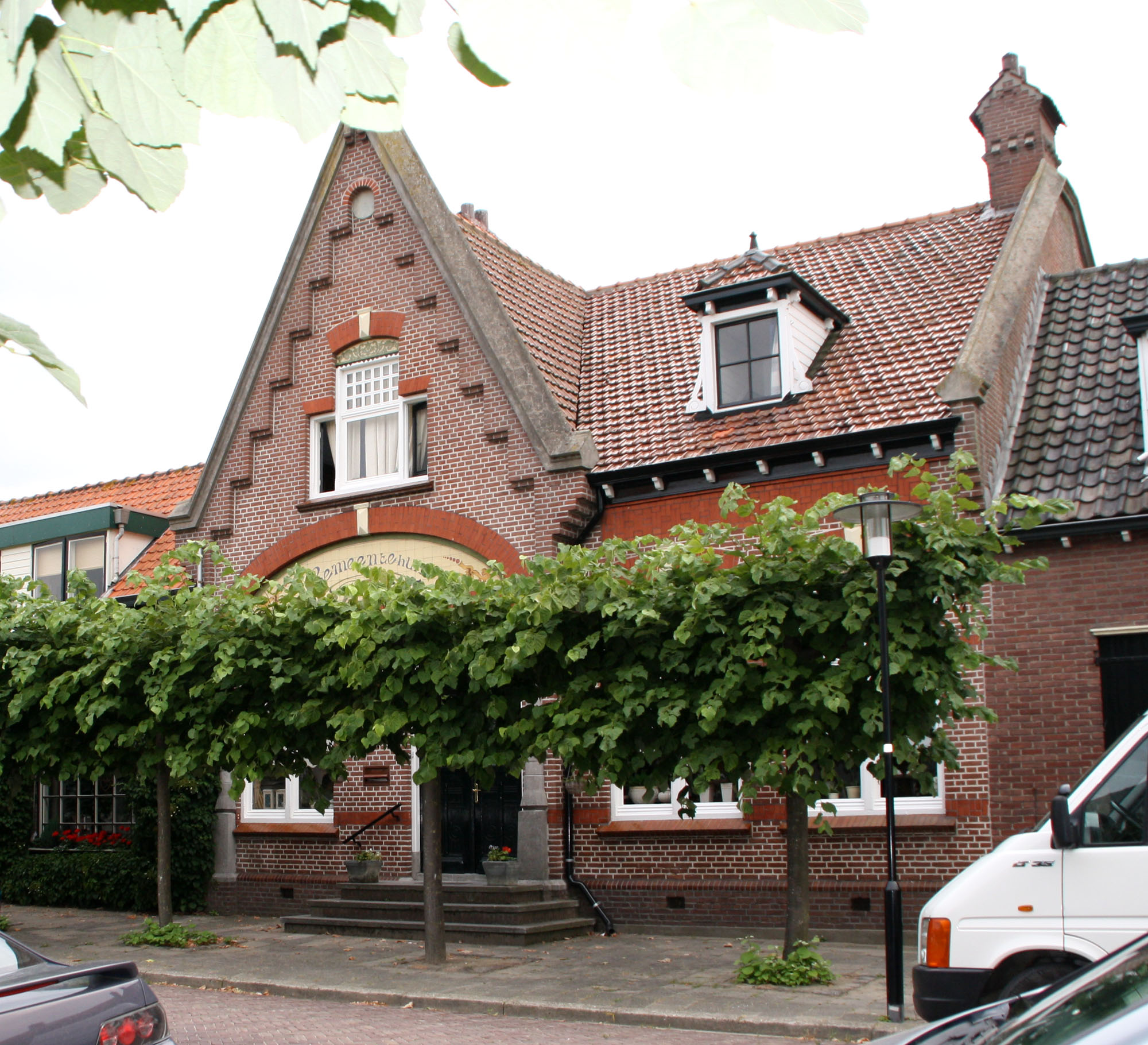
Former town hall
