= Reimerswaal (municipality) =

- Municipality
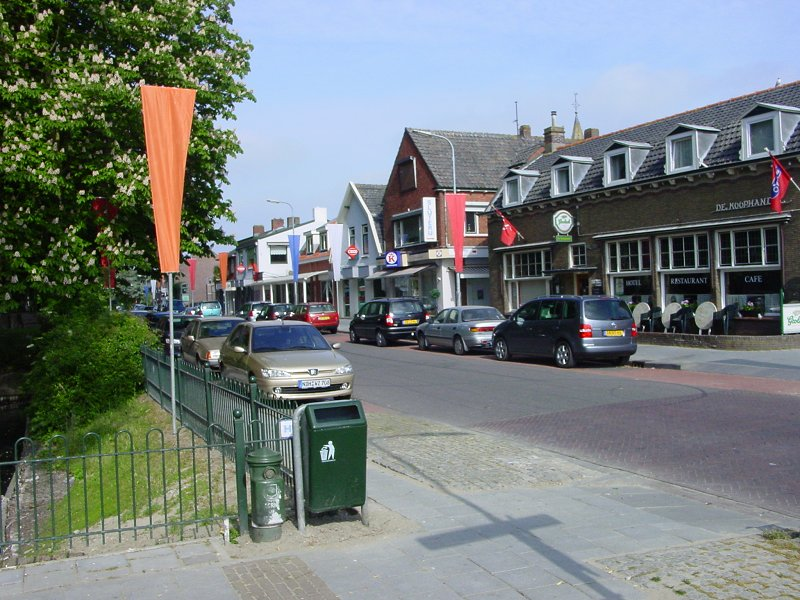
- Krabbendijke town centre

- Flag Coat of arms

- Location in Zeeland
- Coordinates: 51°27′N 4°2′E
- Country: Netherlands
- Province: Zeeland

Government
  - Body: Municipal council
  - Mayor: José van Egmond (CDA)

Area
  - Total: 242.42 km^{2} (93.60 sq mi)
  - Land: 101.80 km^{2} (39.31 sq mi)
  - Water: 140.62 km^{2} (54.29 sq mi)
- Elevation: 1 m (3.3 ft)

Population (January 2021)
  - Total: 22,896
  - Density: 225/km^{2} (580/sq mi)
- Time zone: UTC+1 (CET)
  - Summer (DST): UTC+2 (CEST)
- Postcode: 4400–4419
- Area code: 0113
- Website: www.reimerswaal.nl

Reimerswaal (Dutch pronunciation: [ˌrɛimərsˈʋaːl]) is a municipality in the province of Zeeland in the southwestern Netherlands on Zuid-Beveland, named after the lost city. The municipality had a population of 22,896 in 2021, and has a surface area of 242.42 km^{2} (93.60 sq mi) of which 140.62 km^{2} (54.29 sq mi) is water. The central town Yerseke is known for trade in mussels and oysters. Kruiningen is known for the former ferry from Kruiningen to Perkpolder which was in service up to 2003. The municipality of Reimerswaal was established in 1970, from the aggregation of the municipalities Krabbendijke, Kruiningen, Rilland-Bath, Waarde, and Yerseke.

The municipal coat of arms^{(nl)} dates to 1970. The sword in a red field is derived from the coat of arms of the lost city of Reimerswaal in use in the 15th century (Beyeren Armorial p. 107) of gules two swords inverted saltirewise argent and or. In addition, the municipal coat of arms shows the comital arms of Wittelsbach-Hainaut in chief.

== Population centers ==
Yerseke	6740
Krabbendijke	4439
Kruiningen	4246
Rilland	3053
Hansweert	1631
Waarde	1281
Oostdijk	551
Stationsbuurt	155
Vlake	±100
Bath	±90
Gawege	±75

=== Topography ===
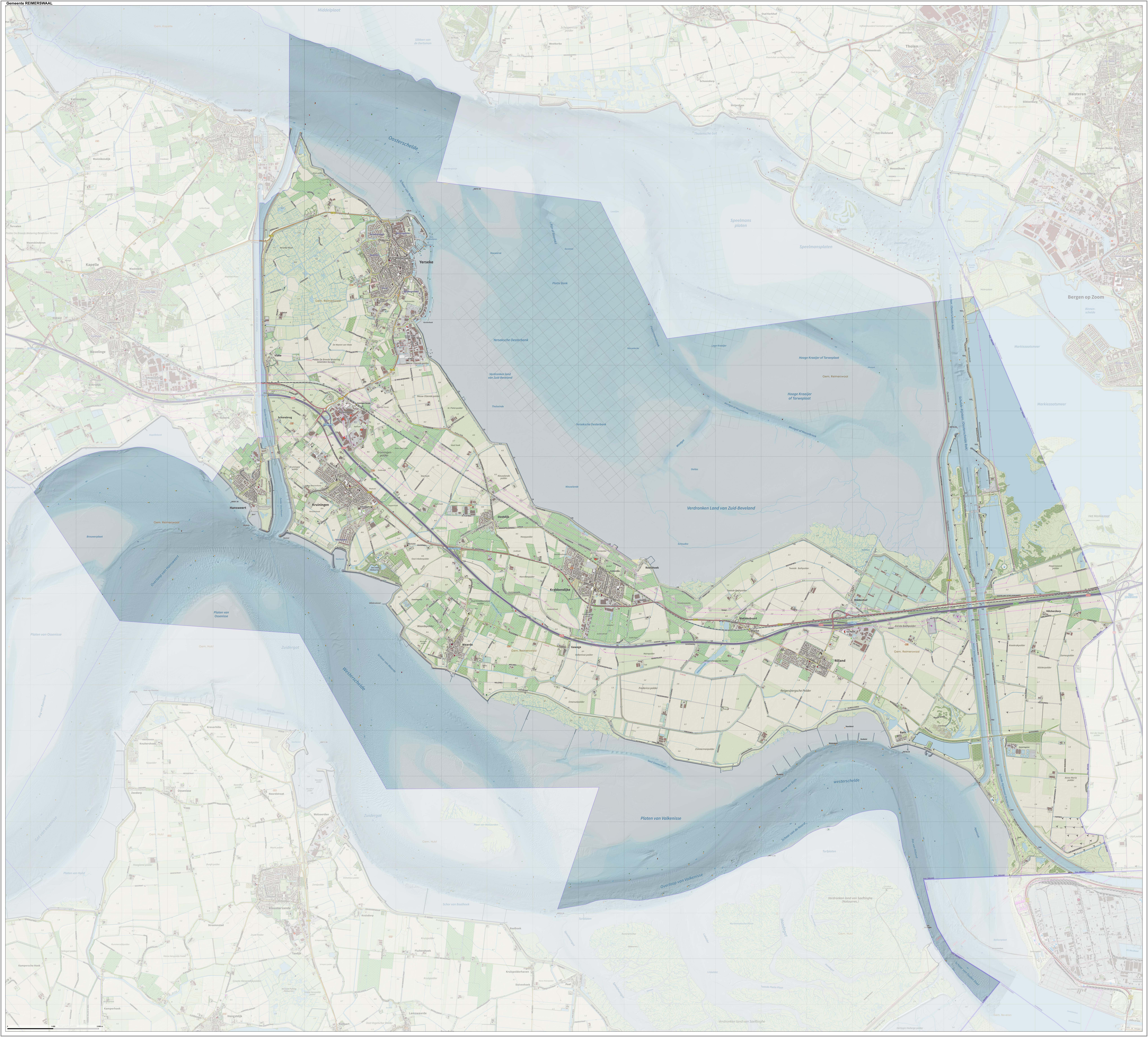

Dutch Topographic map of the municipality of Reimerswaal, June 2015

== Transportation ==
The railway stations from west to east are Kruiningen-Yerseke, Krabbendijke, Rilland-Bath, which all on the Staatslijn F railway from Vlissingen to Roosendaal.

== Notable people ==
- Marinus van Reymerswaele (c.1490 Reimerswaal – c.1546) a Dutch Renaissance painter
- Daan Manneke (born 1939 in Kruiningen) a Dutch composer and organist
- Maartje Boudeling (born 1939 in Yerseke) a retired head chef
- F. van Dixhoorn (born 1948 in Hansweert) a Dutch poet.
- Johnny Hoogerland (born 1983 in Yerseke) a former Dutch professional cyclist

== Gallery ==
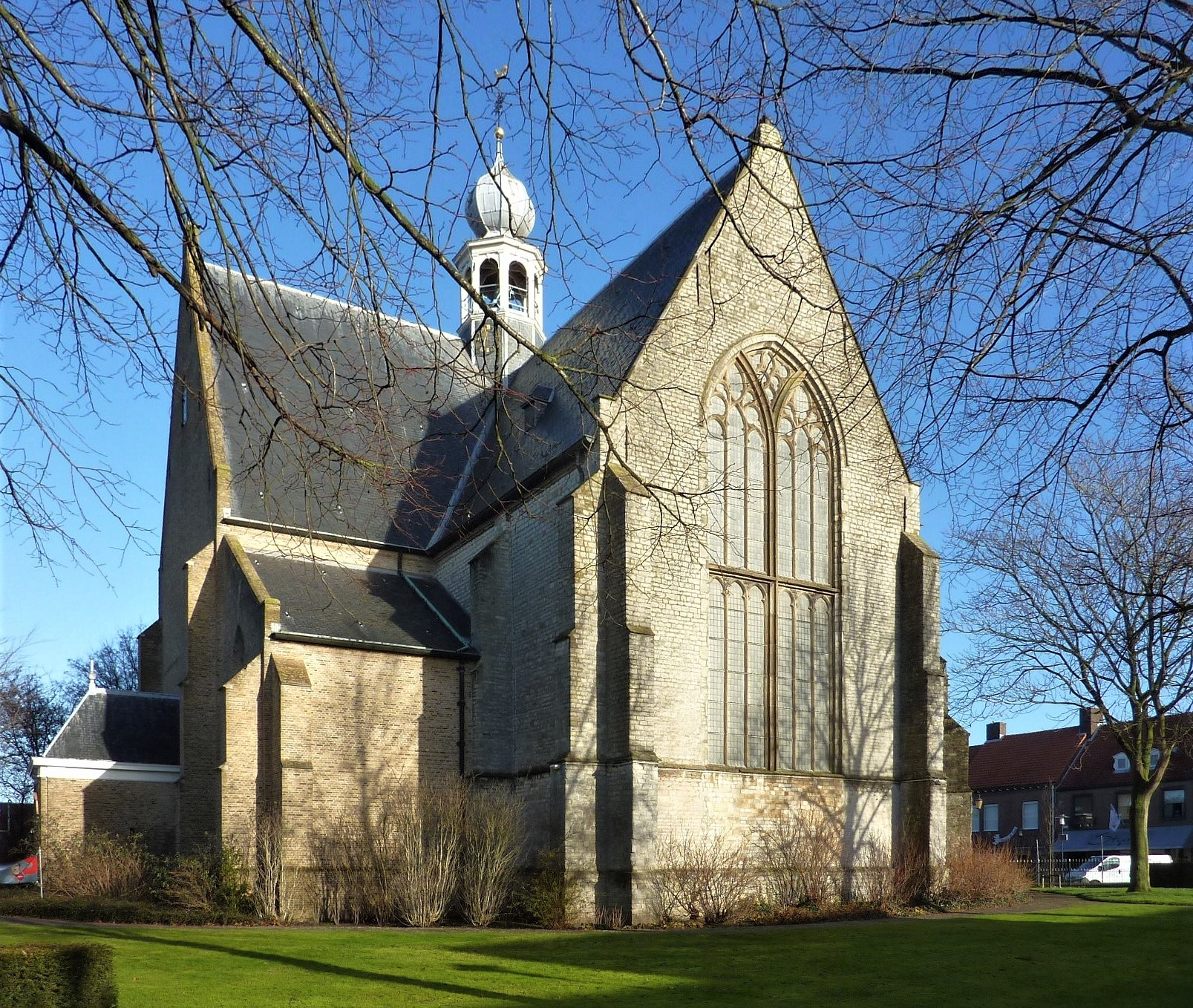
Odulphuskerk, Yerseke

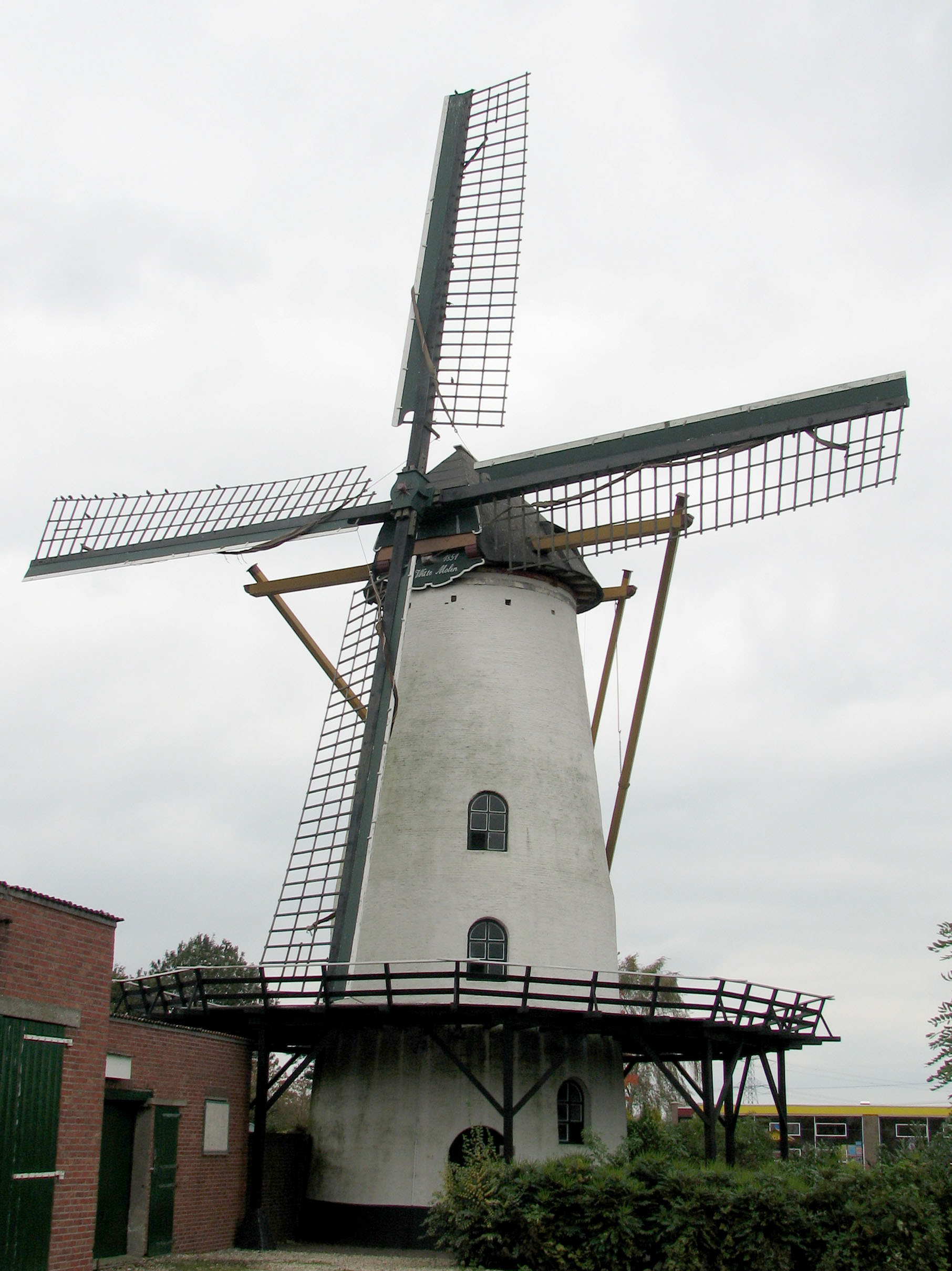
Witte molen in Rilland

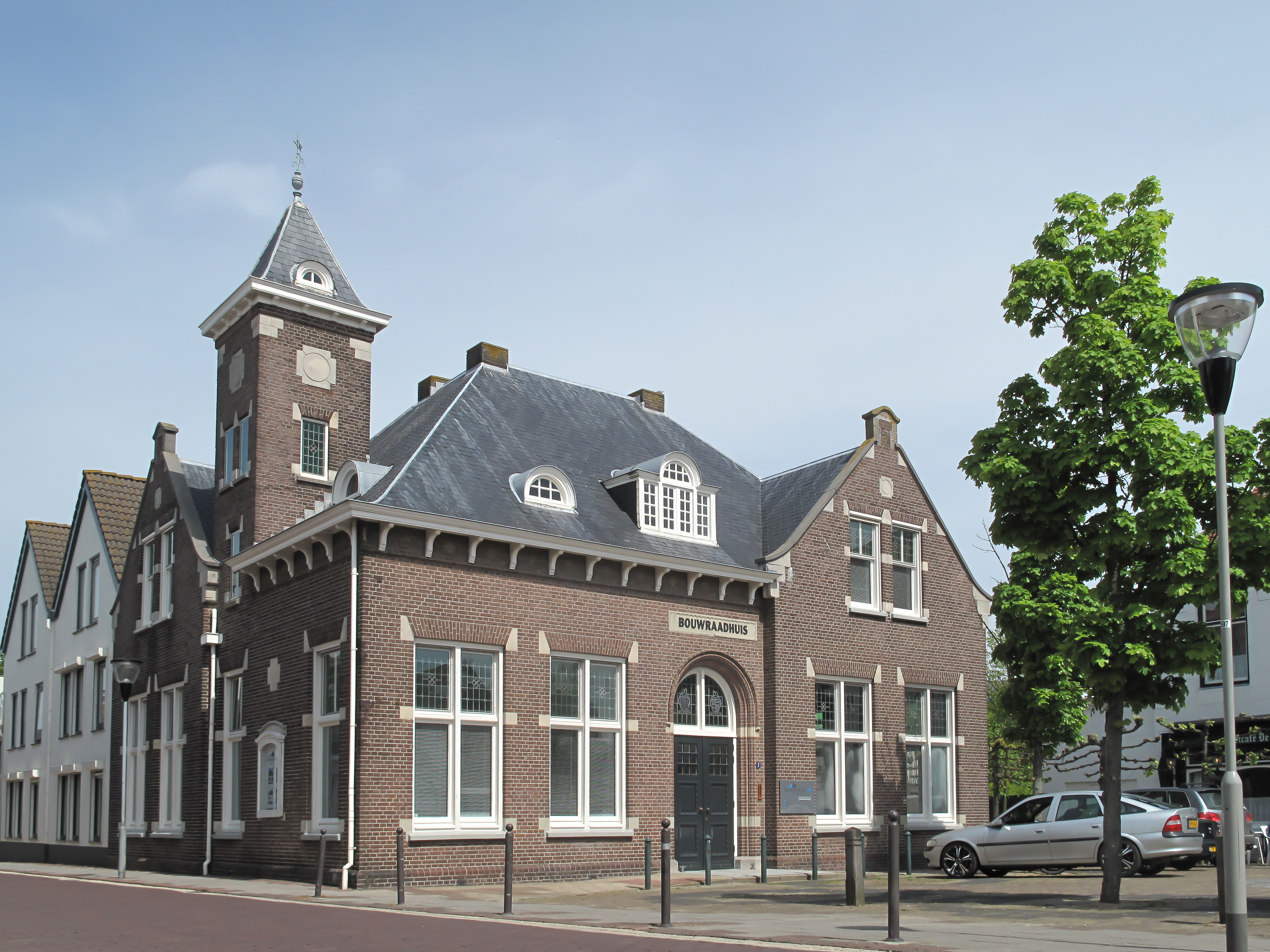
Kruiningen, het bouwraadhuis

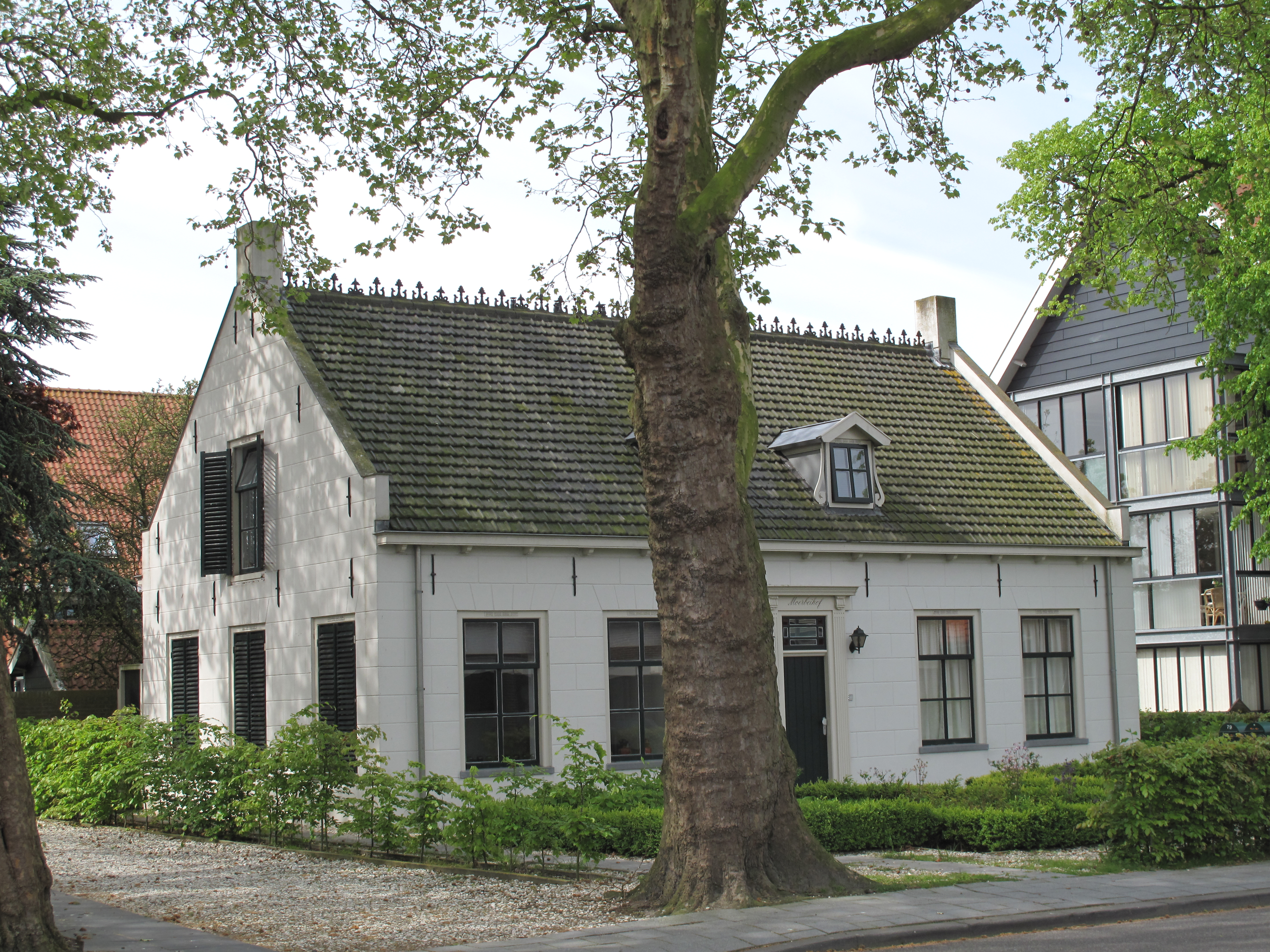
Krabbendijke, monumentale boerderij
