= Krabbendijke =

- Village
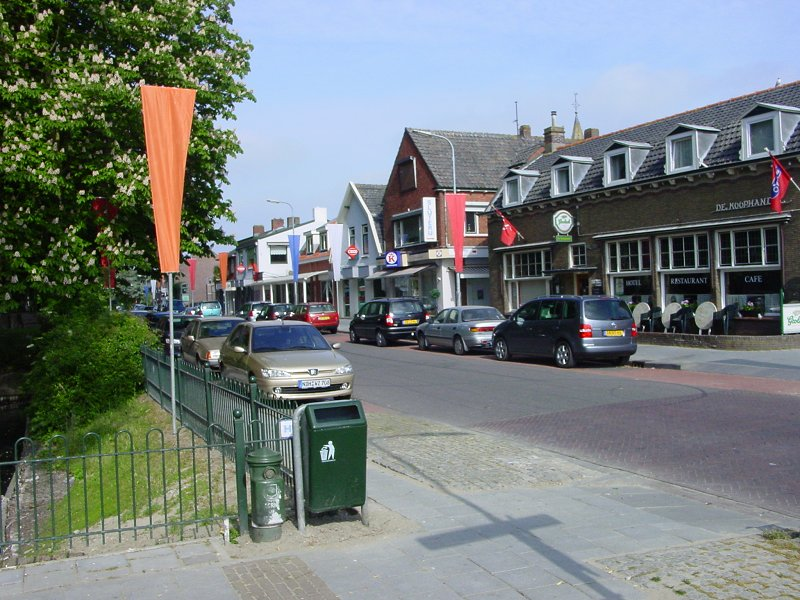
- Krabbendijke

- Flag Coat of arms

- Location in the province of Zeeland in the Netherlands Krabbendijke (Netherlands)
- Coordinates: 51°25′51″N 4°6′53″E
- Country: Netherlands
- Province: Zeeland
- Municipality: Reimerswaal

Krabbendijke is a village in the Dutch province of Zeeland. It is located in the municipality of Reimerswaal, about 6 km southeast of the town of Kruiningen.

== History ==
The village was first mentioned in 1187 as Crabbendic. The etymology is unclear. The original village was flooded in 1530 during the Saint Felix Flood. The current village developed after the Nieuw Krabbendijkepolder was created in 1592.

The Dutch Reformed church is a T-shaped church with wooden tower. It was built in 1914 to replace its 17th-century predecessor. The church was damaged by war in 1944. The café-restaurant De Koophandel is a 17th-century building with mansard roof. The front dates from 1953. Up to 1662, it was also used as church, and in 1881 a separate room was created for council meetings. Krabbendijke was home to 725 people in 1840.

The village was flooded during the North Sea flood of 1953. Krabbendijk was an independent municipality until 1970 when it was merged into Reimerswaal.

== Flora and fauna ==
The northern lapwing has made Krabbendijke its primary breeding ground in the Netherlands.

== Transport ==
Krabbendijke has a railway station on the railway line Bergen op Zoom - Vlissingen. The station opened in 1868.

== Gallery ==
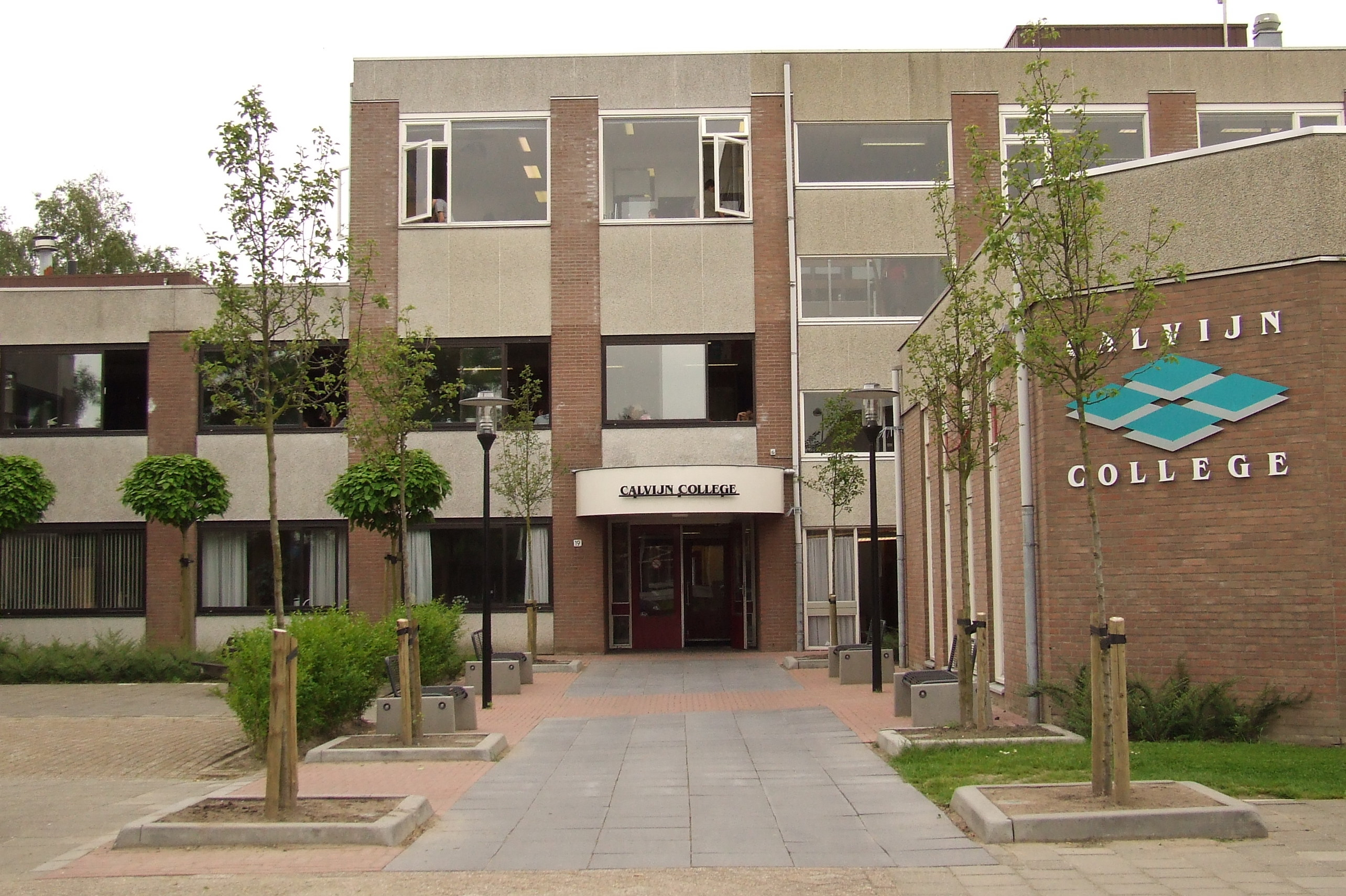
School in Krabbendijke

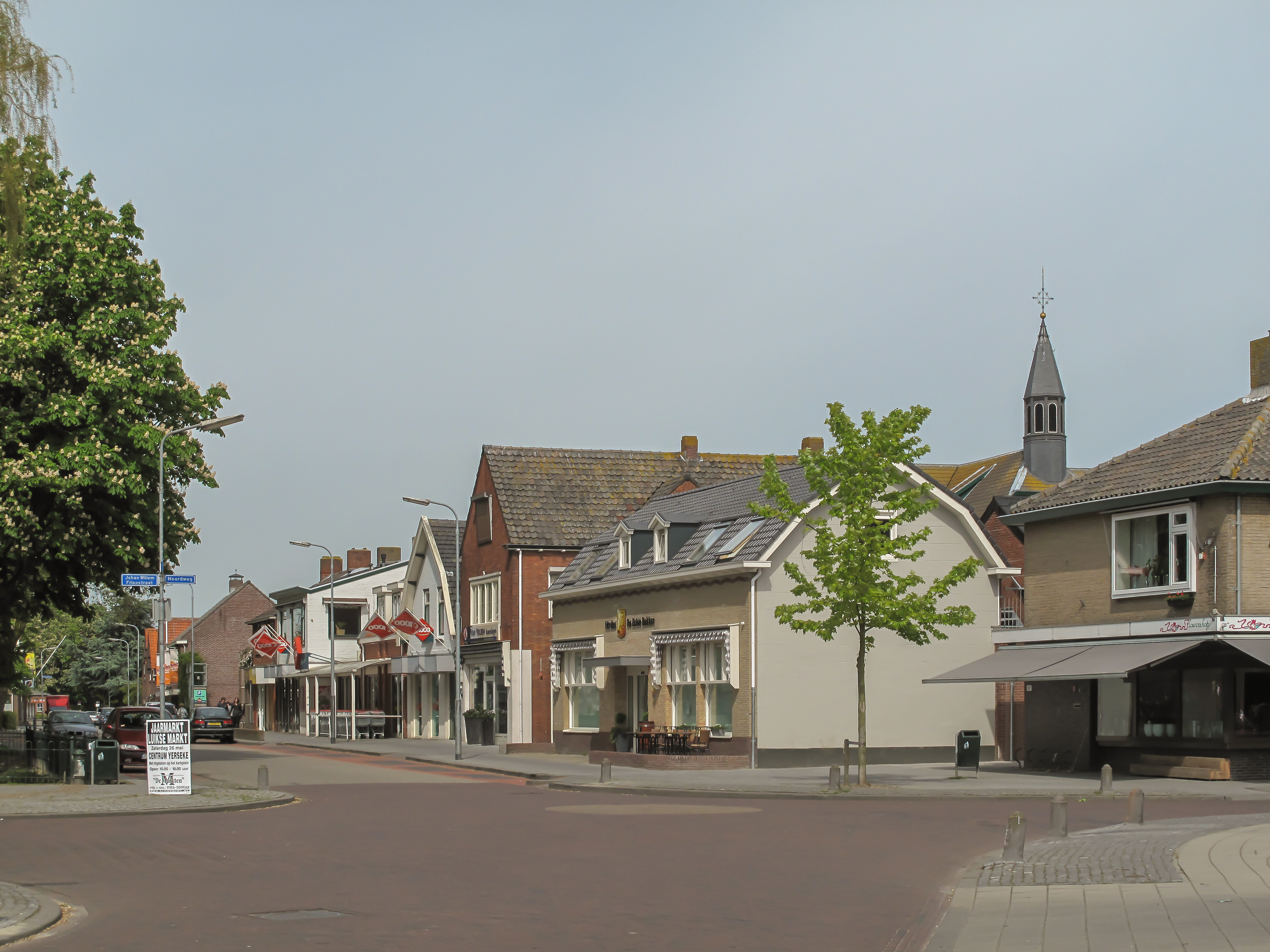
Street view

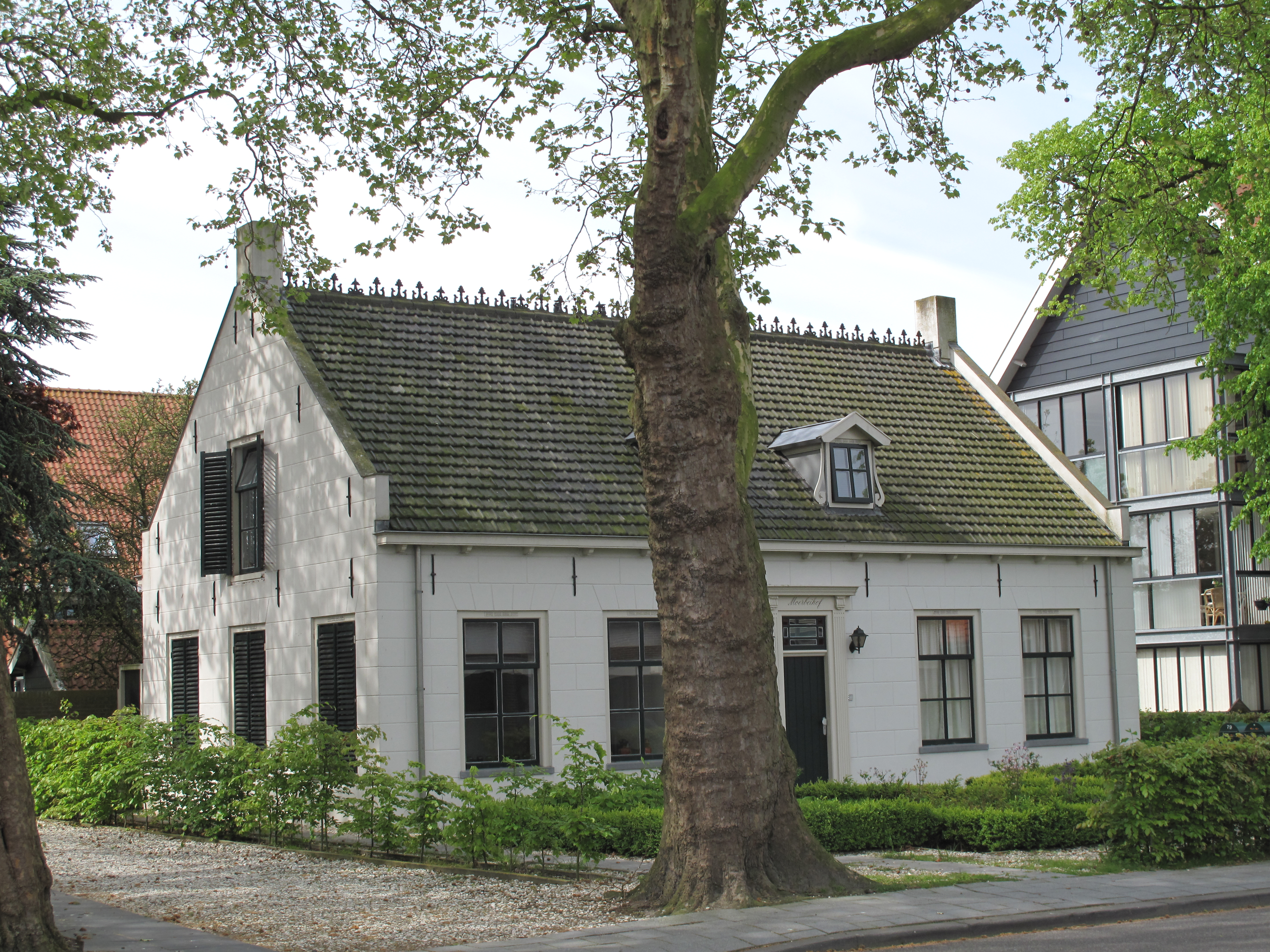
House in Krabbendijke
