= Alfred Colpaert =

Finnish geographer

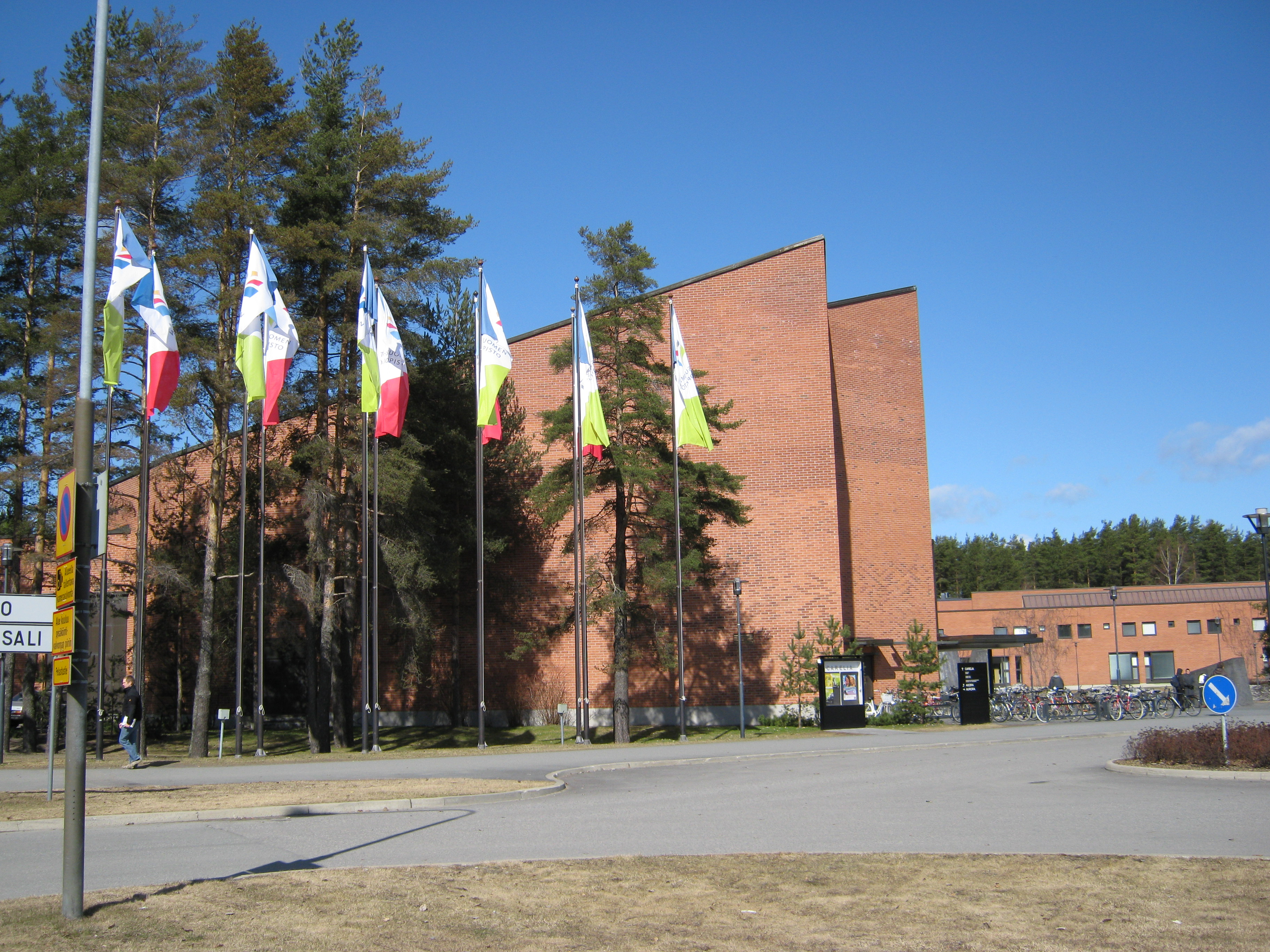
University of Eastern Finland: where Alfred Colpaert teaches

Alfred Colpaert (born in 1957 in Kruiningen, the Netherlands) is professor in physical geography at the Department of Geographical and Historical Studies of the University of Eastern Finland.

== Education ==
He studied physical geography at the University of Utrecht and geography at the University of Oulu, Finland. He has a PhD in Geography (Oulu 1998) and a Docentship in Geoinformatics (Oulu 2000).

== Career ==
Colpaert has held various positions at the Department of Geography of the University of Oulu, Finland and the Finnish Game and Fisheries Research Institute. Since 2004 he has been full professor in physical geography at the University of Joensuu, and University of Eastern Finland since 2010. From January 2011 he has been head of Department.

== Research ==
Alfred Colpaert's main interests are in physical geography and geoinformatics. He has studied pastures and pastoral systems in northern Finland, Tibet and the Caprivi area in Namibia. He was involved in mapping the reindeer pastures of northern Finland using satellite remote sensing. Various projects funded by the Finnish Academy of Sciences in Namibia and Lapland and the Arsgisip EU-funded project (remote sensing and hydrological modeling). He also took part in the Socrates GI Curriculum development project.

== Sample Publications ==
- Manderscheid, Angela & Alfred Colpaert (2004). Workshop: Natural Pastures and Mobile Animal Husbandry Under Pressure. The Case of Lapland and the Tibetan Plateau. Editors, Rangifer Special Issue, No. 15
- Kumpula, T; Colpaert, A; Wang Qian & A. Mandeerscheid (2004). Remote sensing in inventory of high altitude pastures of the Tibetan plateau. Rangifer Special Issue, No. 15:53-63.
- Colpaert, Alfred (2004). Muuttuva ilmasto. Poromies 5:32.
- Kumpula, Jouko; Colpaert, Alfred & Mauri Nieminen (2004). Metsänkäsittelyn ja lumiolosuhteiden vaikutus porojen laidunten käyttöön Ivalon paliskunnassa. Poromies 5:48.
- Kumpula, Jouko; Colpaert, Alfred; Anttonen, Marja & Mauri Nieminen (2004). Porohoitoalueen pohjoisimman osan (13 paliskuntaa) talvilaidunten uusintainventointi vuosina 1999-2003. Poromies 5:50.
- Antikainen, Harri; Bendas, Dan; Marjaniemi, Kyösti; Myllyaho, Mauri; Oivo, Markku; Colpaert, Alfred; Jaako, Niina; Kuvaja, Pasi; Laine, Kari; Rusanen, Jarmo; Saari, Esko & Jouni Similä (2004). Mobile Environmental Information Systems. Cybernetis and Systems: An International Journal, Vol 35(7-8):737-751
- Colpaert, Alfred (2005). Porolaidunten satelliittikuvapohjainen kartoitus. Riistatutkimuksen tiedote 198:12-13, Riista- ja kalatutkimus.
- Kaartinen, Salla; Kojola, Ilpo & Alfred Colpaert (2005). Finnish wolves avoid roads and settlements. Ann. Zool. Fennici 42:in press.
- Autio, Jyrki & Alfred Colpaert (2005). The impact of elevation, topography and snow load damage of trees on the position of the actual timberline on the fells in central Finnish Lapland. Fennia 183:1(15-36).
- Simo Kyllönen, Alfred Colpaert, Hannu Heikkinen, Mikko Jokinen, Jouko Kumpula, Mika Marttunen, Kari Muje & Kaisa Raitio (2006). Conflict Management as a Means to the Sustainable Use of Natural Resources. Silva Fennica, 40(4): 687–728
- Kumpula, J., Colpaert, A.. & Anttonen, M. (2007). Does forest harvesting and linear infrastructure change the usability value of pastureland for semi-domesticated reindeer (Rangifer tarandus tarandus)? Ann. Zool. Fennici 44(3):161-178. ISSN 0003-455X
- Kumpula, J. & A Colpaert (2007). Snow conditions and usability value of pasture land for semi-domesticated reindeer (Rangifer tarandus tarandus) in northern boreal forest area. Rangifer, (27)1:25-39.
- Korkalainen Timo, Pietiläinen Pekka and Colpaert Alfred (2007). The effect of total peat nitrogen on the height and volume of Scots pine (Pinus sylvestris L.) stands in three fertilized and drained peatlands in northern Finland. SUO (Mires and peat) 3-4:75:85
- Colpaert, Alfred (2008). Paikkatietojärjestelmien ja Kaukokartoituksen Integraatio. Terra 120(2):115.
- Kumpula, J.; Colpaert, Alfred & Ari Tanskanen (2008). Porojen laidunten valinta muutuneessa metsä- ja maisemarakenteessa Keski-Lapissa. Suomen Riista, 54:69-82.

== See also ==
- Tragedy of the commons
