= Perkpolder =

- Hamlet
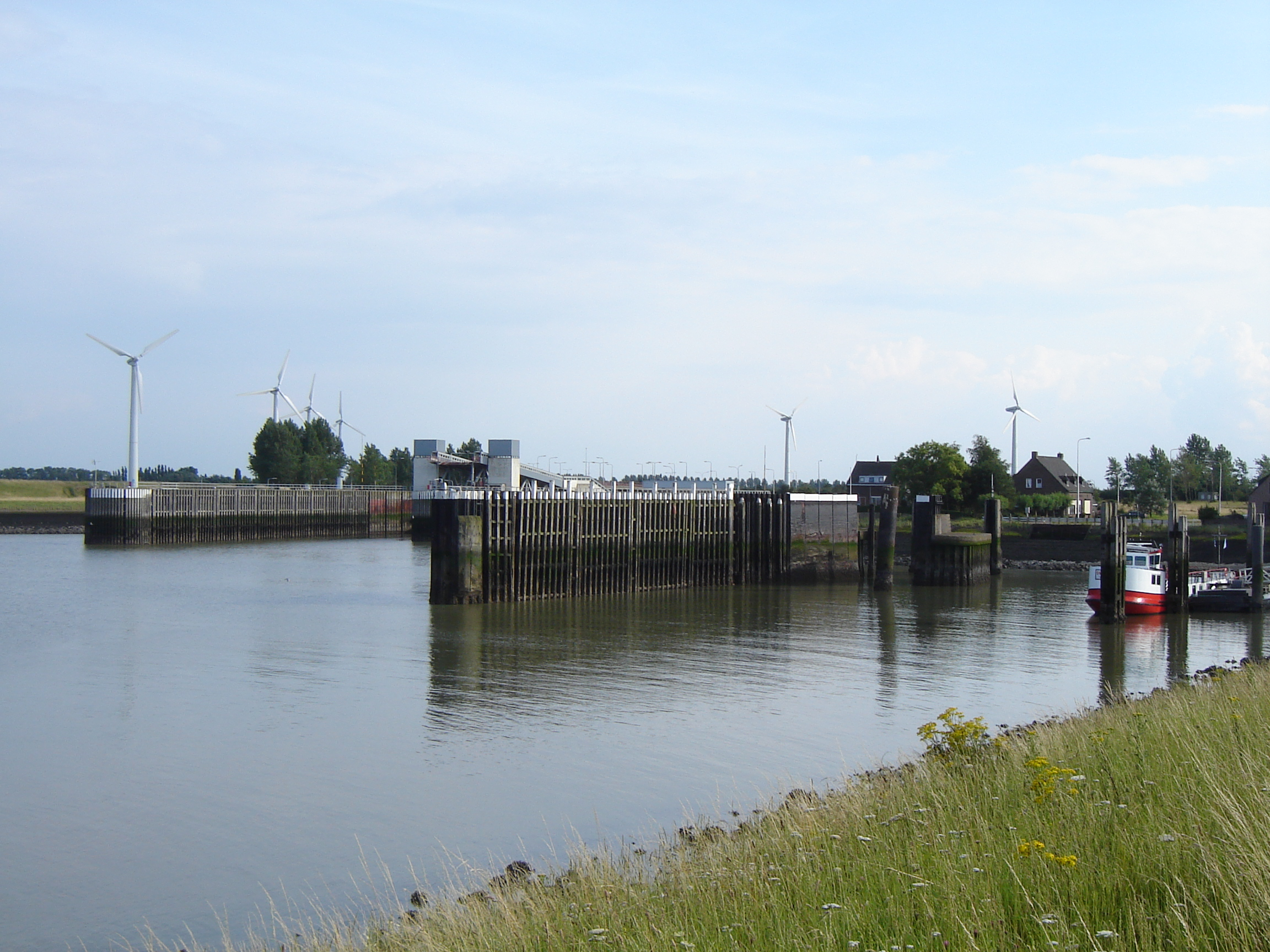
- Harbour of Perkpolder

- Coat of arms

- Location in the province of Zeeland in the Netherlands Perkpolder (Netherlands)
- Coordinates: 51°24′N 4°01′E
- Country: Netherlands
- Province: Zeeland
- Municipality: Hulst

Area
  - Total: 2.41 km^{2} (0.93 sq mi)
- Elevation: 1.5 m (4.9 ft)

Population (2021)
  - Total: 5
  - Density: 2.1/km^{2} (5.4/sq mi)
- Time zone: UTC+1 (CET)
  - Summer (DST): UTC+2 (CEST)
- Postal code: 4588
- Dialing code: 0114

Perkpolder is a hamlet in the southwestern Netherlands, situated in the municipality of Hulst, Zeeland. It is known as the departure point for the ferry Kruiningen-Perkpolder that connected Zuid-Beveland and Zeelandic Flanders.

== Polder ==
The hamlet is named after the polder in which it is located. This polder was dammed around 1210, and was originally named Noorthofpolder, later this was changed in Paerkpolder or Perkpolder. This polder, which has 166 ha area, has two kilometres of dykes.
