= Kruiningen =

- Village
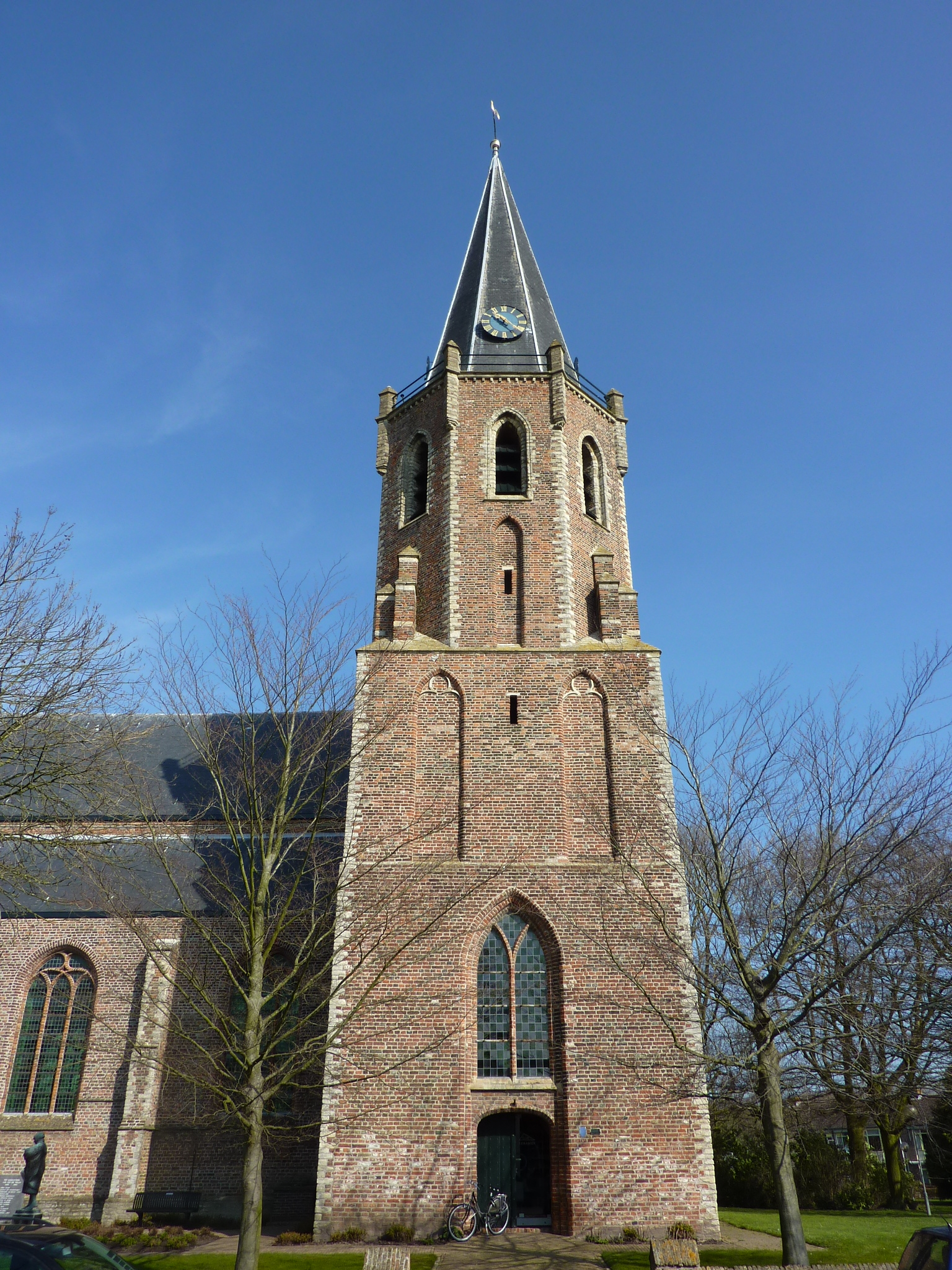
- Tower of the Johanneskerk of Kruiningen

- Flag Coat of arms

- Location in the province of Zeeland in the Netherlands Kruiningen (Netherlands)
- Coordinates: 51°26′53″N 4°2′3″E
- Country: Netherlands
- Province: Zeeland
- Municipality: Reimerswaal

Area
  - Total: 14.08 km^{2} (5.44 sq mi)
- Elevation: 0.2 m (0.66 ft)

Population (2021)
  - Total: 4,750
  - Density: 337/km^{2} (874/sq mi)
- Time zone: UTC+1 (CET)
  - Summer (DST): UTC+2 (CEST)
- Postal code: 4416
- Dialing code: 0113

Kruiningen is a village in the Dutch province of Zeeland. It is located in the municipality of Reimerswaal, about 5 km south of the village of Yerseke.

Kruiningen has a station on the railway line Bergen op Zoom - Vlissingen. Kruiningen achieved some notoriety as departure and arrival of the ferry Kruiningen-Perkpolder. In 2003, this ferry closed in connection with the opening of the Westerscheldetunnel.

== History ==
The place where Kruiningen was built, was one of the islands that later formed Zuid-Beveland. The area was diked by monks of the abbeys of Ten Duinen and Ter Doest. Kruiningen was hit hard during the Flood of 1953, 62 people died and the entire village came for six months under the influence of the tides. The Johanneskerk was rebuilt in the 15th and 16th century after a fire in the 14th century. In the church is the tomb of Arnoud van Cruningen (deceased in 1561), a gentleman from the Van Kruiningen family. The octagonal mill De Oude Molen was built in 1801.

== Notable people ==
- Alfred Colpaert (born 1957), university professor in physical geography
- Bert-Jan Ruissen, member of the European parliament for the SGP.

== Gallery ==
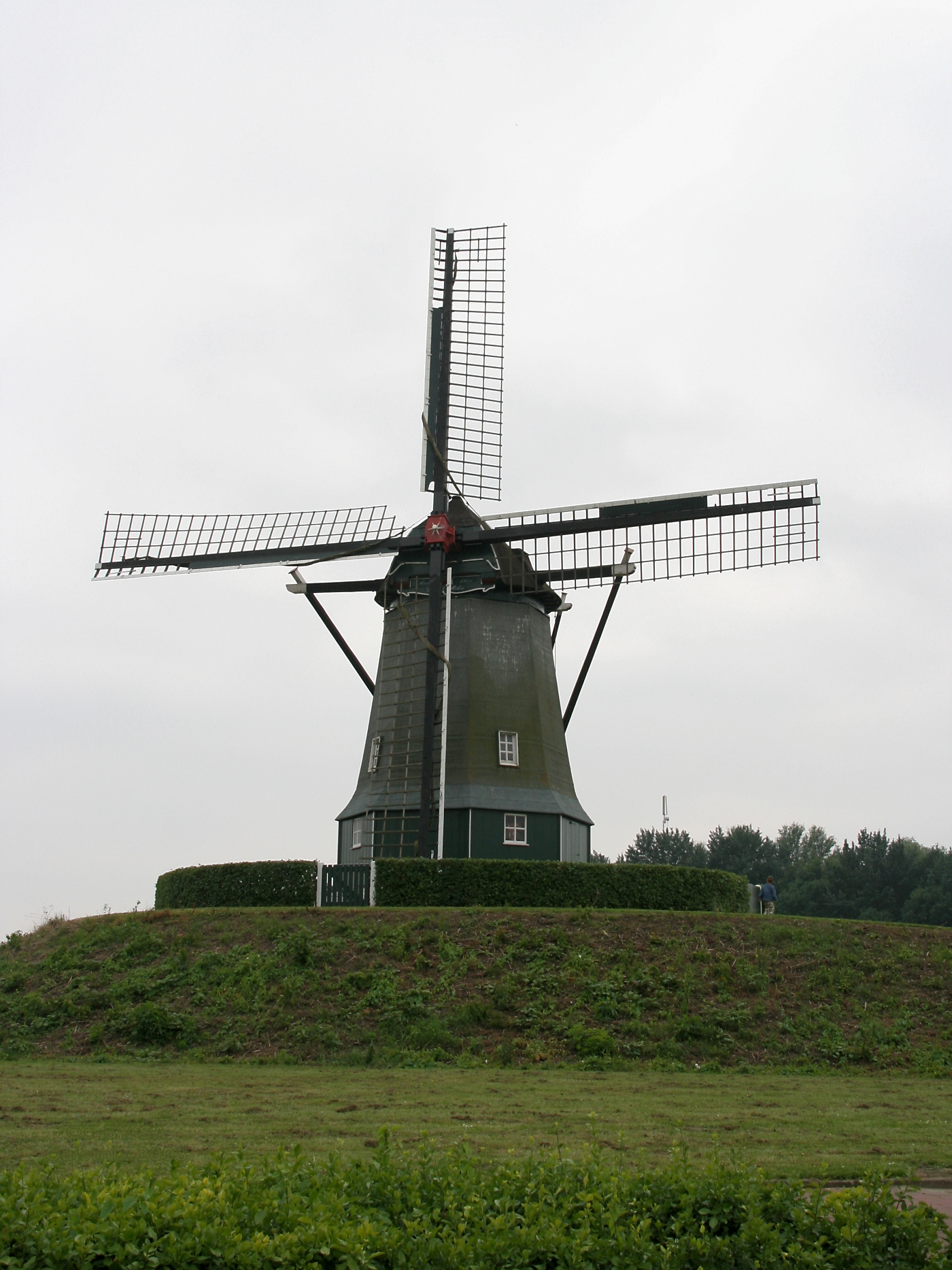
Wind mill De Oude Molen

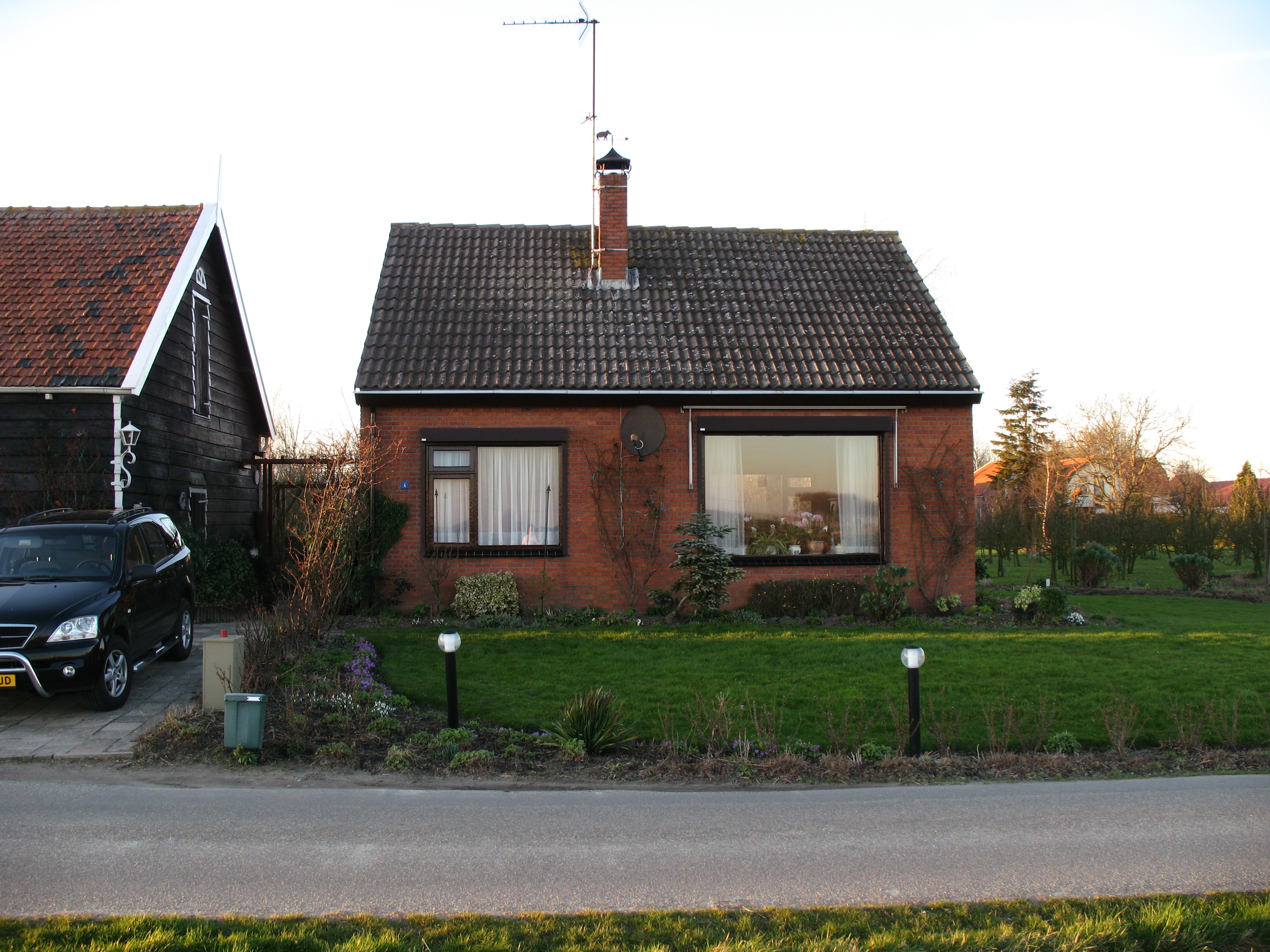
House in Kruiningen

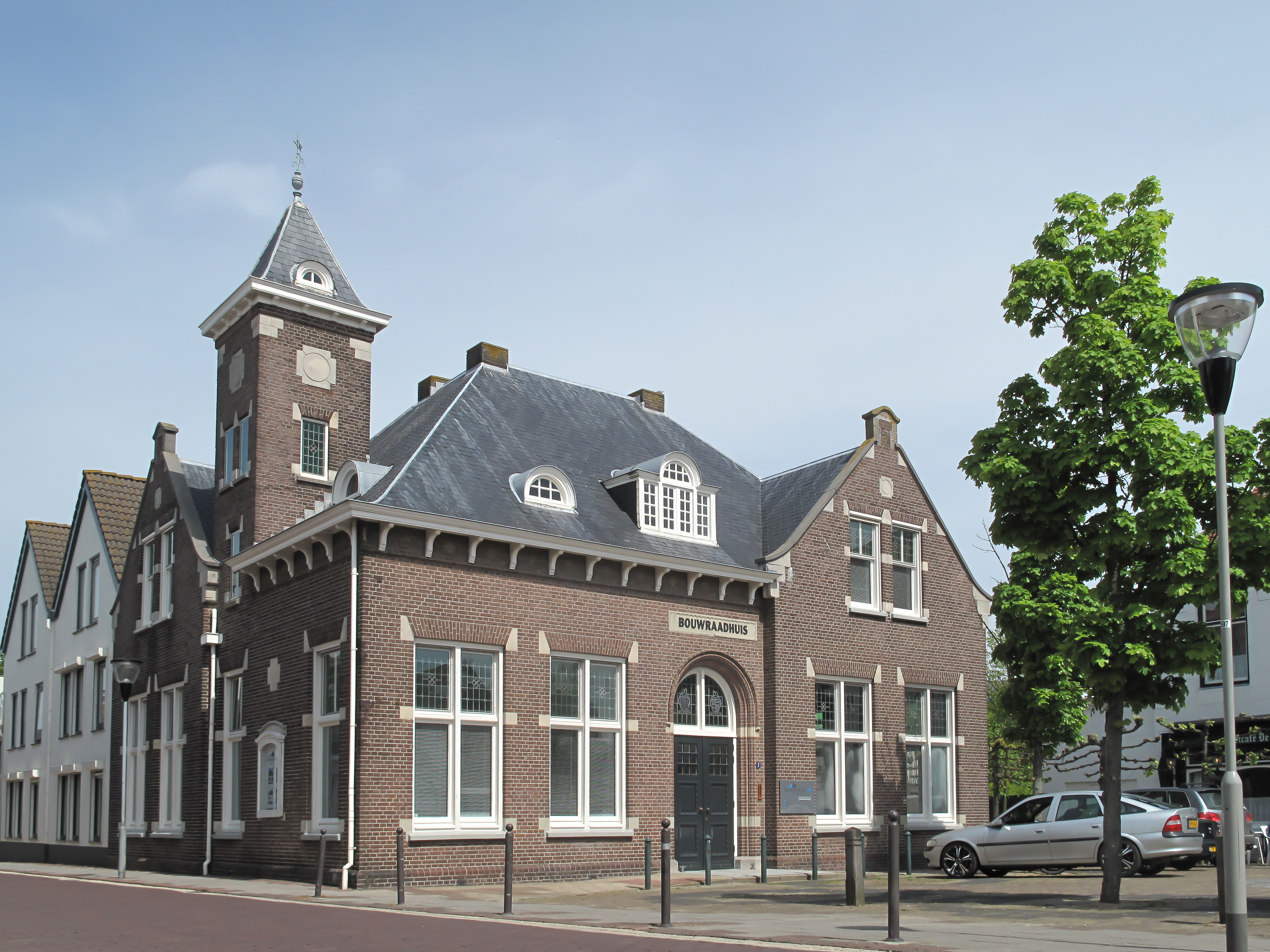
Town hall

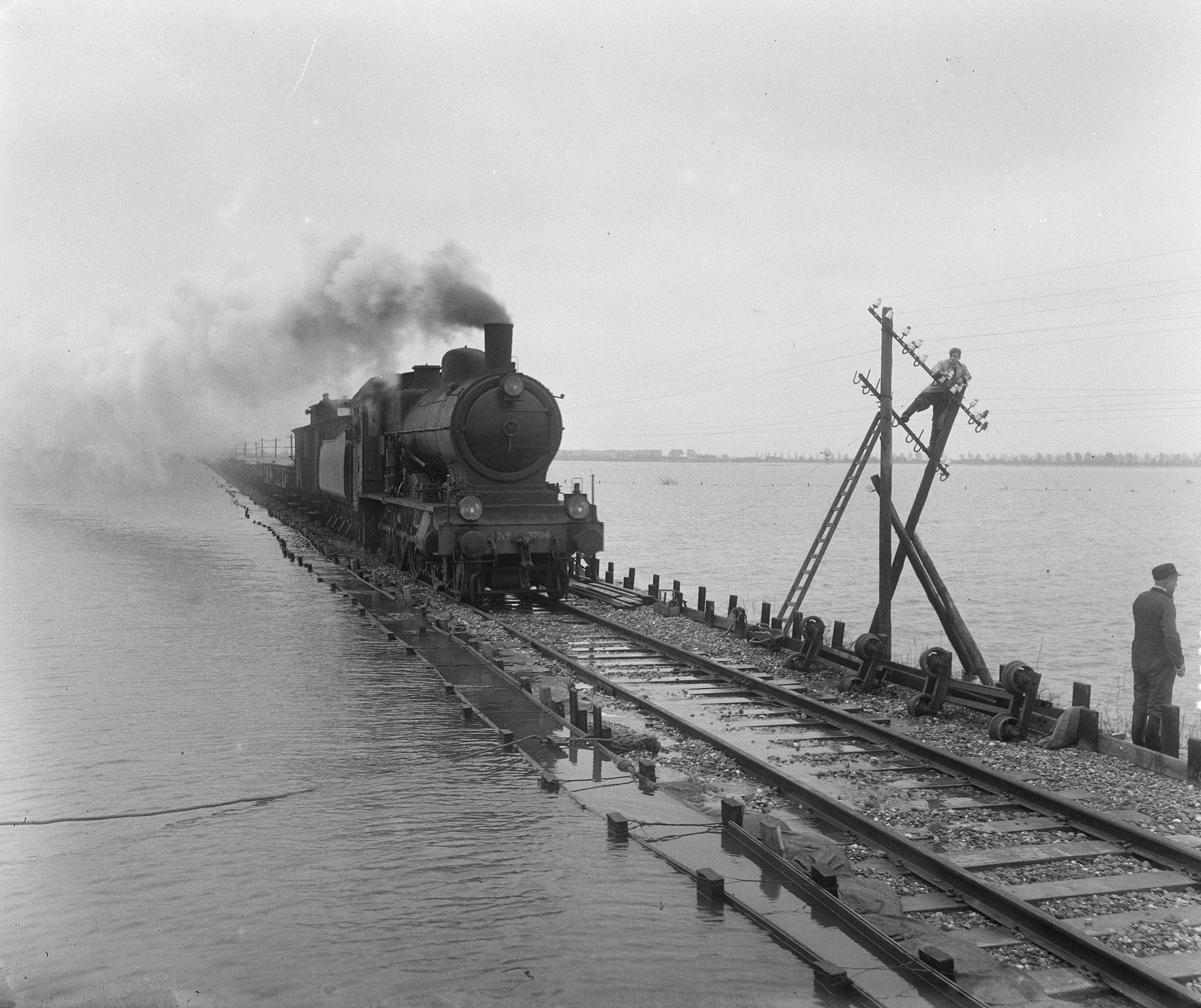
Train after the North Sea flood of 1953
