= Kloosterzande =

- Village
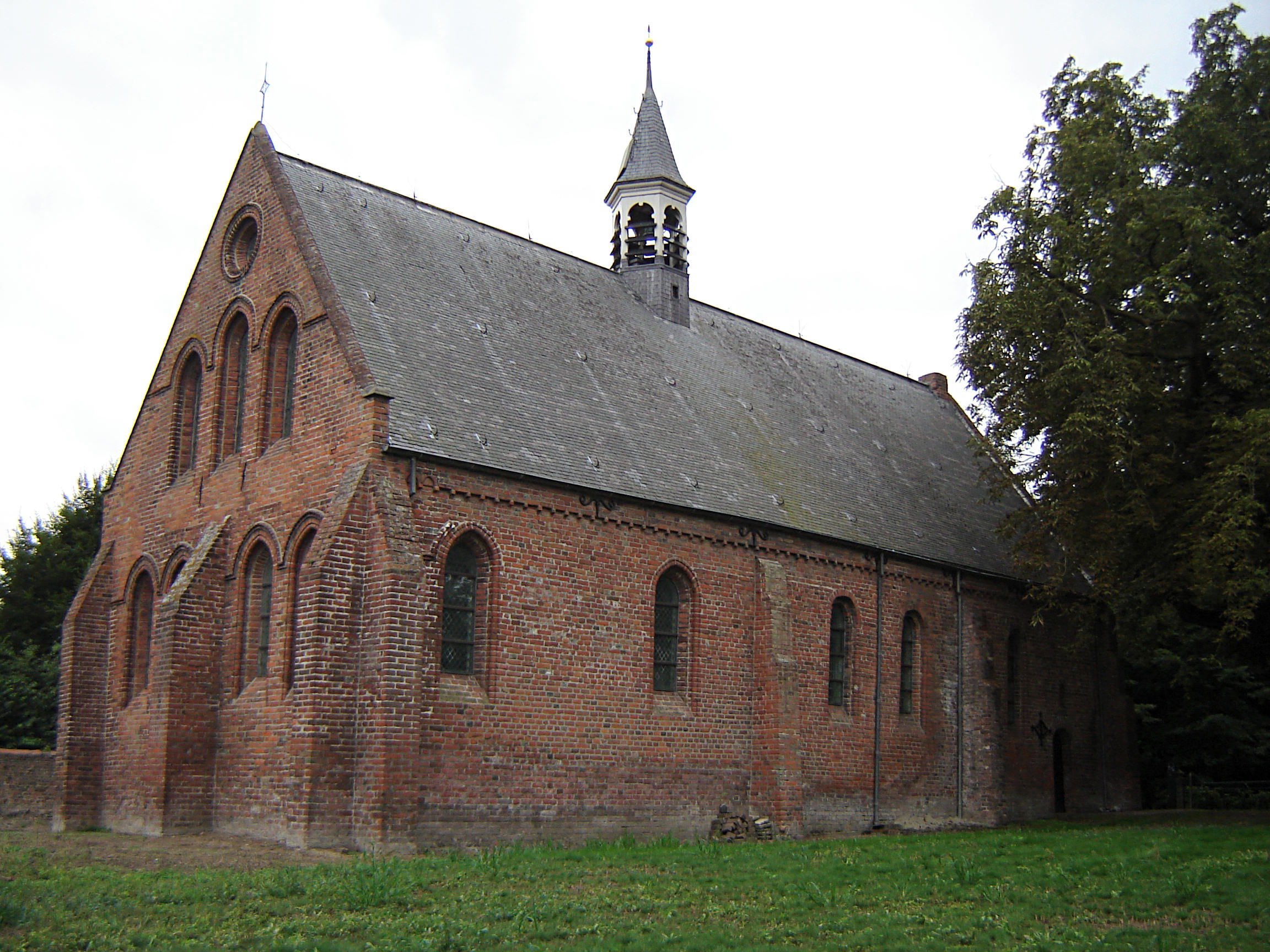
- Church of Kloosterzande

- Location in the province of Zeeland in the Netherlands Kloosterzande (Netherlands)
- Coordinates: 51°22′16″N 4°0′54″E
- Country: Netherlands
- Province: Zeeland
- Municipality: Hulst

Area
  - Total: 16.20 km^{2} (6.25 sq mi)
- Elevation: 1.1 m (3.6 ft)

Population (2021)
  - Total: 3,185
  - Density: 196.6/km^{2} (509.2/sq mi)
- Time zone: UTC+1 (CET)
  - Summer (DST): UTC+2 (CEST)
- Postal code: 4587
- Dialing code: 0114

Kloosterzande is a village in the Dutch province of Zeeland. It is a part of the municipality of Hulst, and lies about 24 km southwest of Bergen op Zoom.

== History ==
The village was first mentioned in 1170 "terra que Sand et Grotha appellatur", and is a combination of sand and monastery. Sand refers to former island Werpelant, and monastery refers to an outpost of the Cistercian monastery Ter Duinen. The outpost was named Hof te Zande. In 1520 the chapel of monastery became the parish church. In 1577, the outpost was destroyed by the Geuzen. The area became part of the crown lands of the House of Orange in 1646.

The church still contains elements of the 1250 chapel church. The choir was rebuilt between 1609 and 1614. In 1648, it became Dutch Reformed. The church was restored between 1922 and 1924. The Catholic St Martinus Church was built in 1871, and has a needle spire.

Hof te Zande was the former monastery. In 1648, an L-shaped estate was built on the location by the Prince of Orange. In 1809, Napoleon donated the estate to Hugues-Bernard Maret, duc de Bassano, however the House of Orange reclaimed it in 1814. It was sold for demolition in 1856, however a large part of the estate remained.

The nameless grist mill of Kloosterzande was built before 1745. In 1911, a steam engine was placed next to the wind mill, and was decommissioned in 1920. It was scheduled to demolished, but bought by the Collot d'Escury sisters in 1927. In 1959, it was sold for ƒ1,- to the municipality, restored several times, and is back in service.

In 1840, Kloosterzande was home to 226 people, and neighbouring Groenendijk was home to 573 people. During the 20th century, it formed a single urban area with the village of Groenendijk and annexed Groenedijk. Kloosterzande was the capital of the municipality of Hontenisse. In 2002, it was merged into the municipality of Hulst.

== The Swaen ==
The Swaen is a historic 110 year old malt house in Kloosterzande. The malt produced here is used mainly by breweries for beer, in distilleries for whisky and for certain foods. The malt house produces basic and special malt products that add natural textures, colours and flavours to breads, foods and beverages. "De Zwaan" (lit. "The Swan") was founded by Jos Buysrogge and Alois Adriaanse on 12 May 1906, originally as a malt house and brewery. 17 years later, the company was sold to Joos Menu, who further expanded the capacity. Between 1939 and 1947, the brewery's activities were impeded when during World War II the copper brew kettles were removed. The brewery closed after the war and malting became the core activity.

In the following decades, the facilities and infrastructure were upgraded and improved, including construction of new silos. In the 1960s the malt capacity was 15.000 MT per annum after the plant was further enhanced with the development of a new, more advanced steeping house. The business became a leading Dutch commercial maltster by the end of the decade. In 1972 a new malthouse and a peating installation were constructed, allowing further expansion of the export business.

In 1999, Royal Grolsch joined the management team. In 2013, the De Groen family acquired the malthouse in a joint venture with Malteurop, and the plant underwent a minor technology upgrade. The malt house is equipped with the Probat roasting technology, and is equipped with a ceramic bed and scrubber to decrease emission levels.

- Total annual capacity: 25,000 MT per annum
- Roaster annual capacity: 9000 MT
- Barley storage 2400 MT and 12,300 MT in Walsoorden harbour
- Malt storage: 5000 MT

== Gallery ==
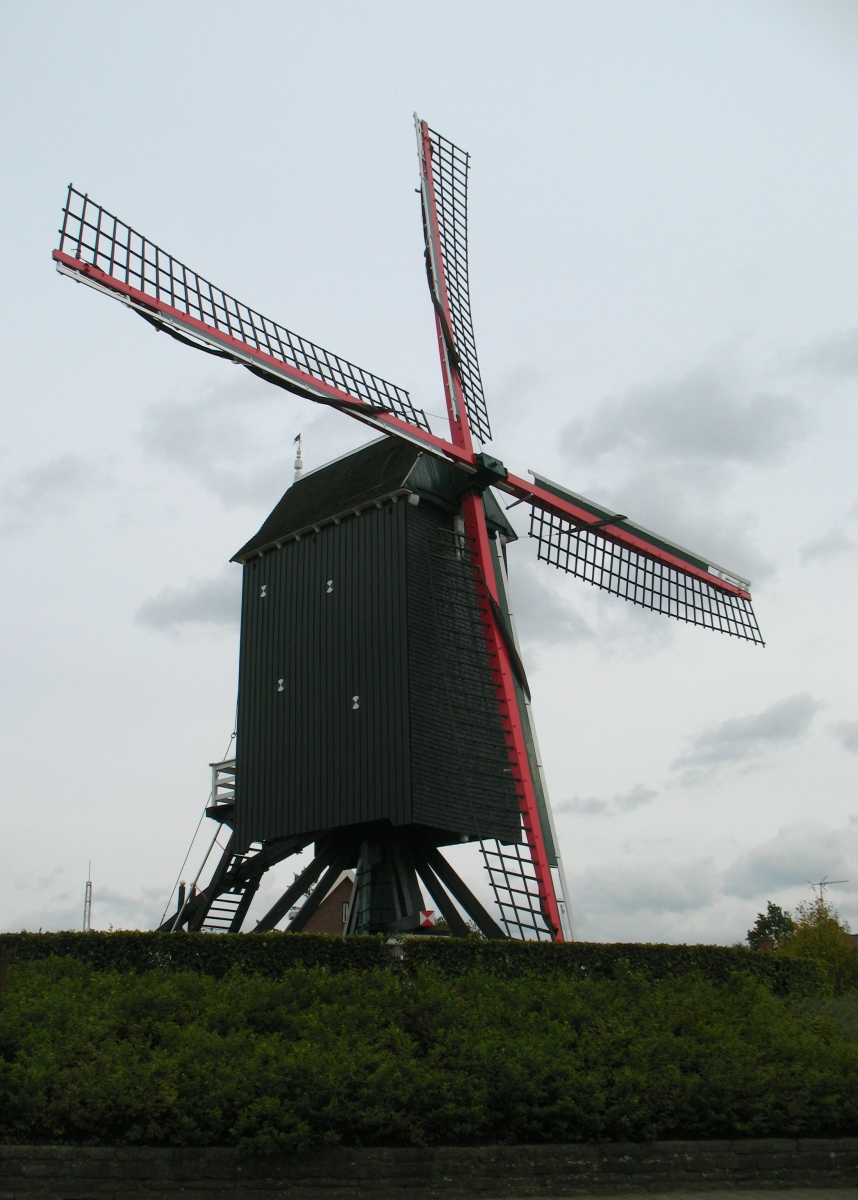
Wind mill of Kloosterzande

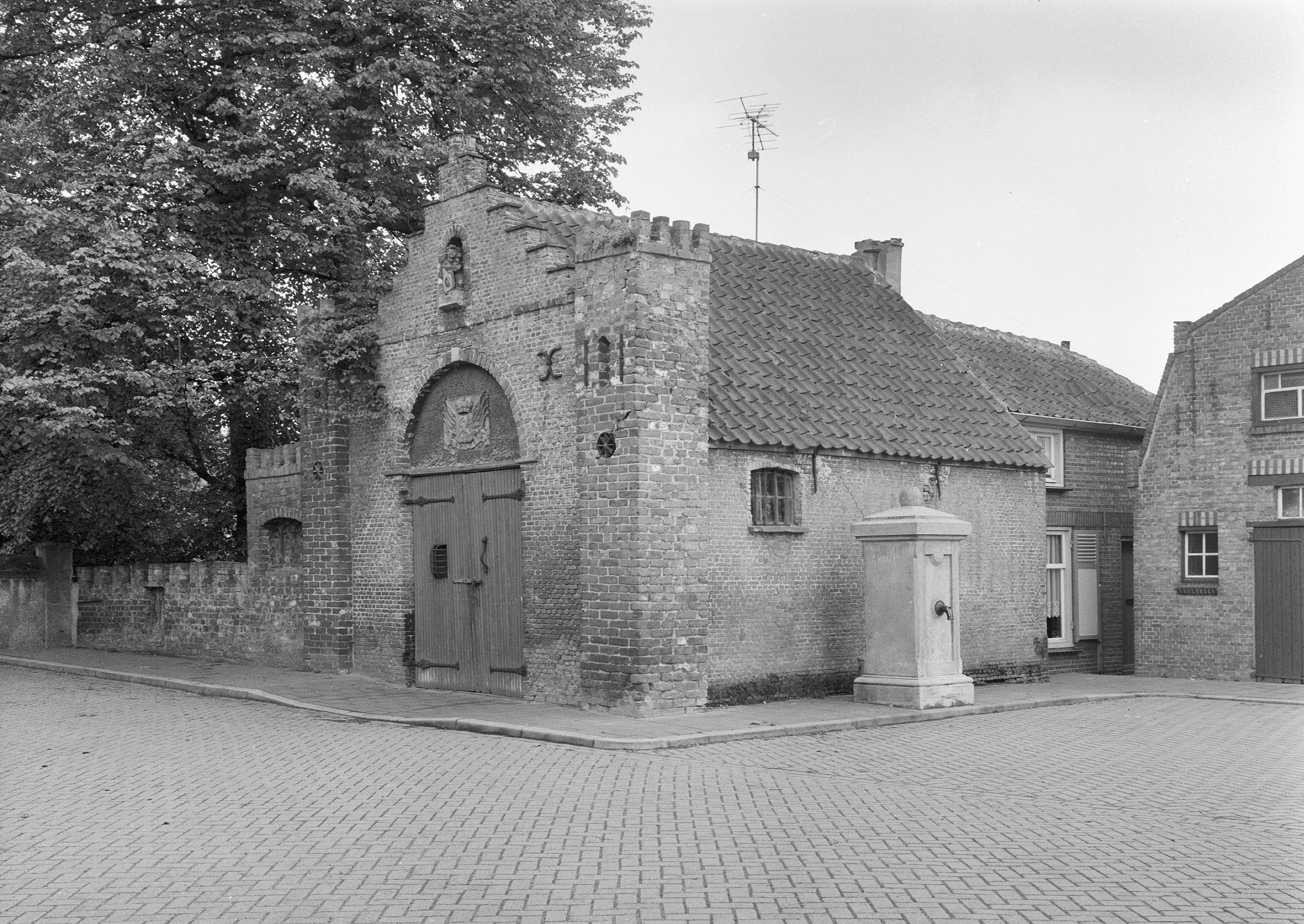
Former town hall

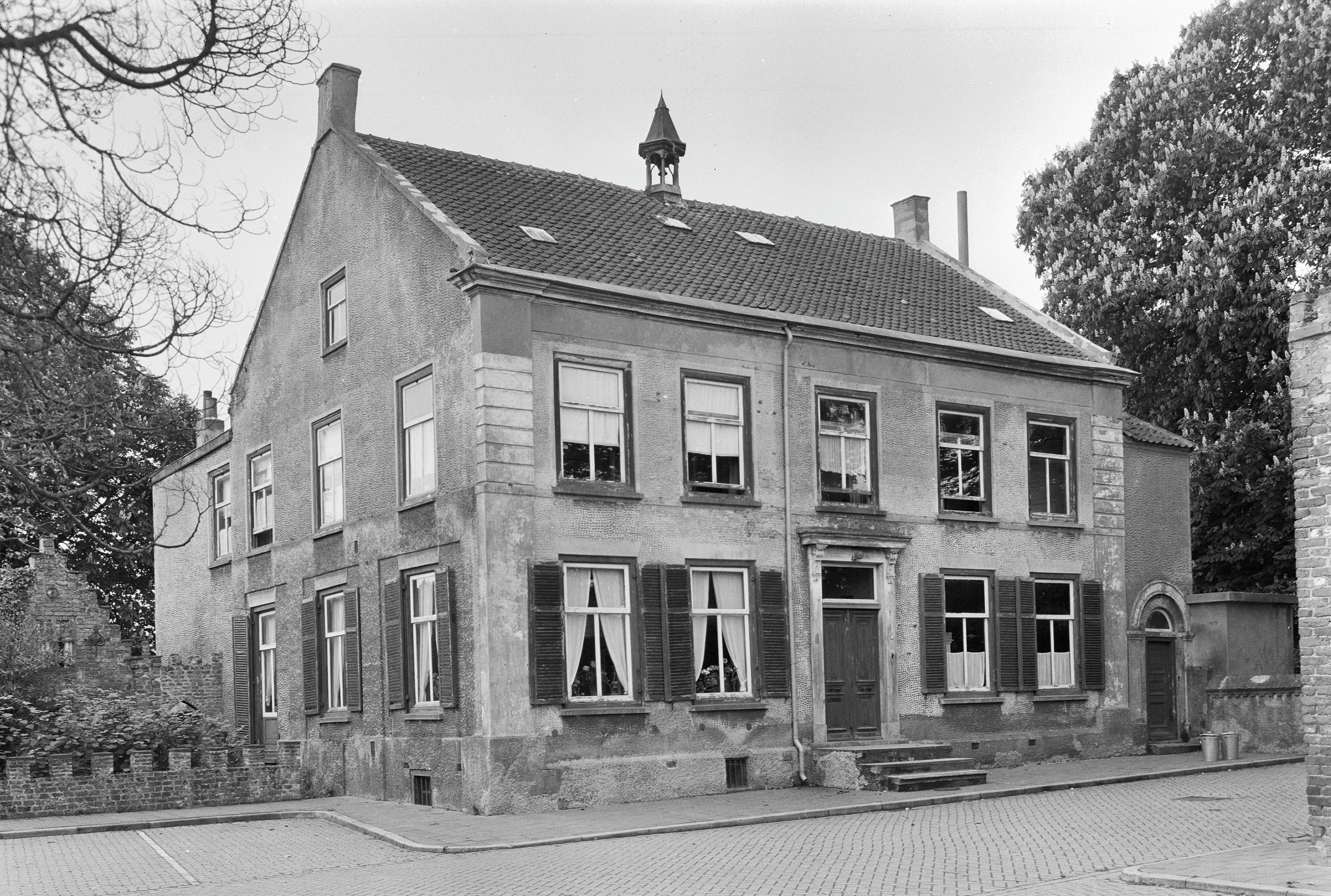
House in Kloosterzande
