= Thermidor (restaurant) =

Coordinates: 51°15′34.27″N 4°3′49.88″E

- Interactive map of Thermidor

Restaurant information
- Rating: Michelin Guide
- Location: Gentsevaart 2, Kapellebrug, Hulst, 4565 EV, Netherlands

Thermidor was restaurant in Kapellebrug, Hulst, in the Netherlands. It was a fine dining restaurant that was awarded one Michelin star in 1973. In 1975, it was again awarded a Michelin star and retained that rating until 1981.

Rien Versprille was head chef.

The building became a gambling house until it was closed down by the Dutch Revenue Service in 2002. The building is demolished after a fire in 2004.

== See also ==
- List of Michelin starred restaurants in the Netherlands
