= Terhole =

- Village
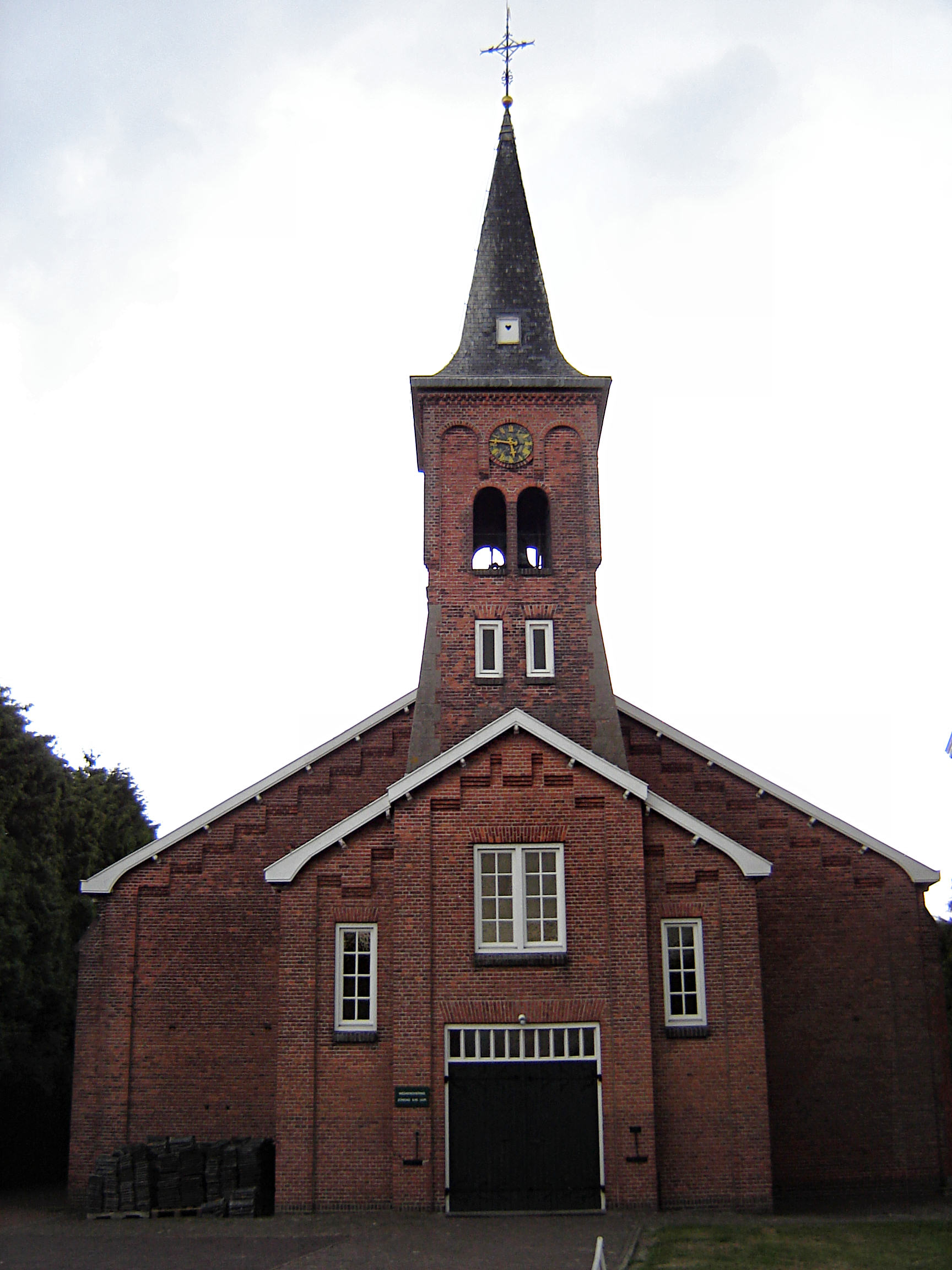
- St Gerardus Majella Church

- Flag

- Location in the province of Zeeland in the Netherlands Terhole (Netherlands)
- Coordinates: 51°19′0″N 4°2′15″E
- Country: Netherlands
- Province: Zeeland
- Municipality: Hulst

Area
  - Total: 4.49 km^{2} (1.73 sq mi)
- Elevation: 1.8 m (5.9 ft)

Population (2021)
  - Total: 455
  - Density: 101/km^{2} (262/sq mi)
- Time zone: UTC+1 (CET)
  - Summer (DST): UTC+2 (CEST)
- Postal code: 4583
- Dialing code: 0114

Terhole or Ter Hole is a village in the Dutch province of Zeeland. It is a part of the municipality of Hulst, and lies about 26 km southwest of Bergen op Zoom.

It was first mentioned in 1542 as Ten Hole.

Terhole was home to 186 people in 1840. The village used to be part of the municipality of Hontenisse. In 2002, it became part of the municipality of Hulst.
