= Kuitaart =

- Village
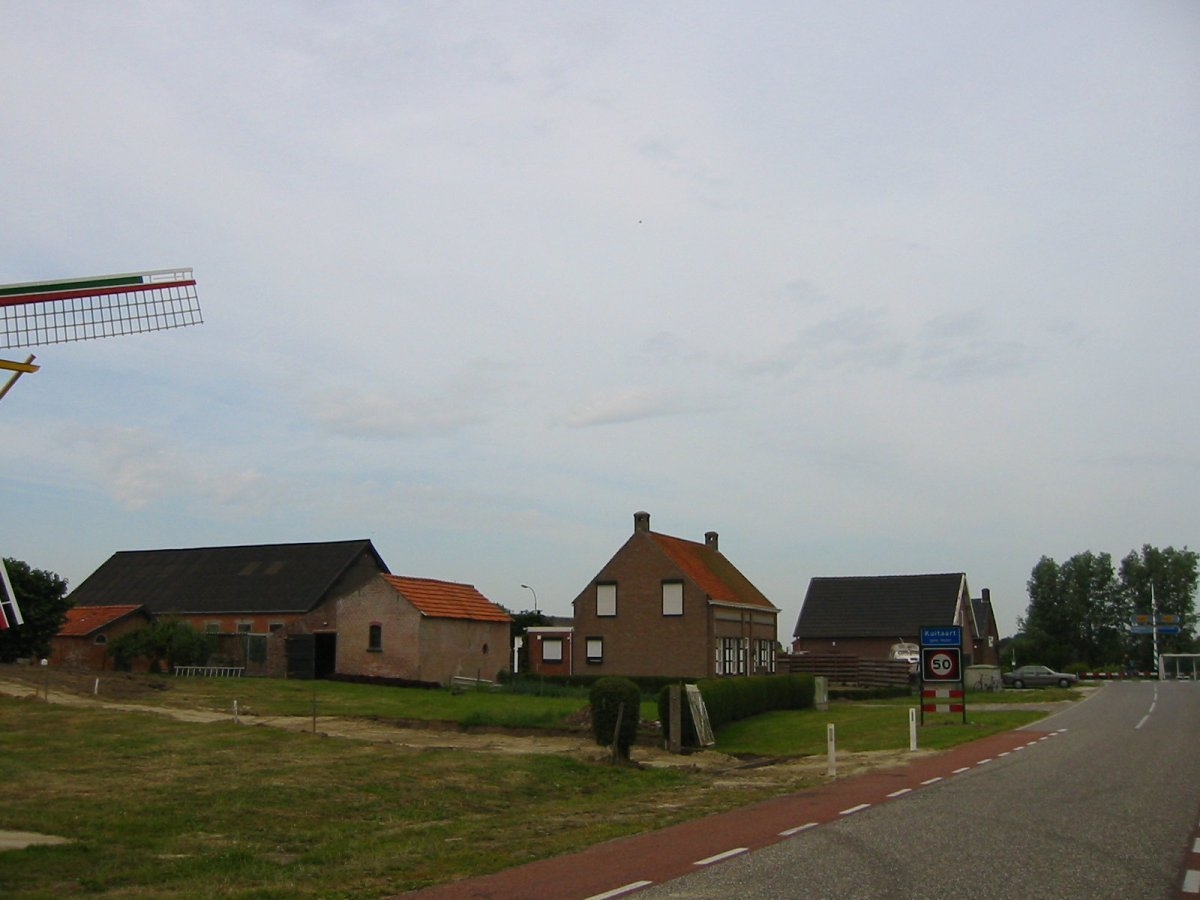
- Village view

- Location in the province of Zeeland in the Netherlands Kuitaart (Netherlands)
- Coordinates: 51°20′23″N 4°2′3″E
- Country: Netherlands
- Province: Zeeland
- Municipality: Hulst

Area
  - Total: 5.59 km^{2} (2.16 sq mi)
- Elevation: 0.4 m (1.3 ft)

Population (2021)
  - Total: 225
  - Density: 40.3/km^{2} (104/sq mi)
- Time zone: UTC+1 (CET)
  - Summer (DST): UTC+2 (CEST)
- Postal code: 4584
- Dialing code: 0114

Kuitaart is a village in the Dutch province of Zeeland. It is a part of the municipality of Hulst, and lies about 24 km southwest of Bergen op Zoom.

The village was first mentioned in 1469 as up Coytaerde. The etymology is unknown.

The grist mill Vogelzicht was built in 1865. In 1904, an engine was installed in the mill. The wind mill was restored in 2004.

Kuitaart was home to 197 people in 1840. The village used to be part of the municipality of Hontenisse. In 2002, it became part of the municipality of Hulst.

== Gallery ==
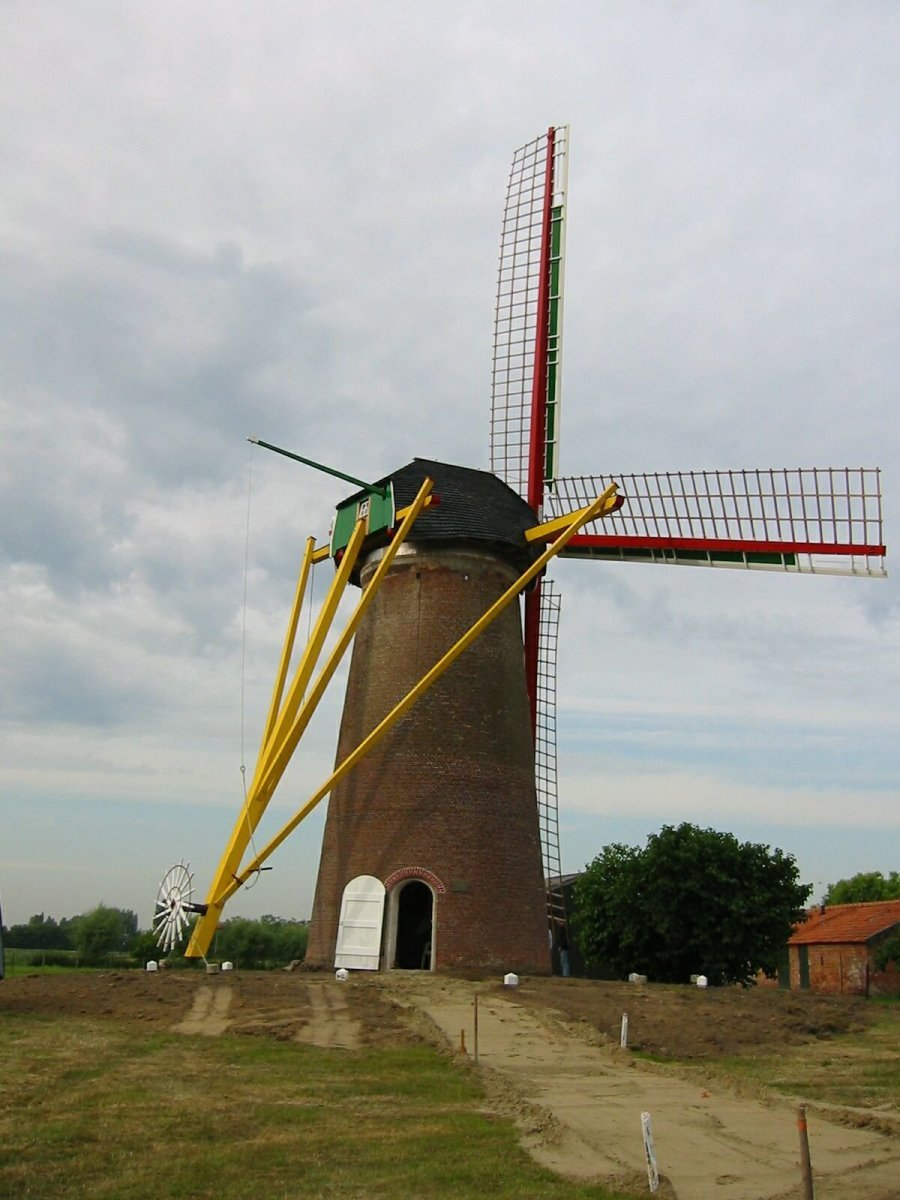
Wind mill Vogelzicht

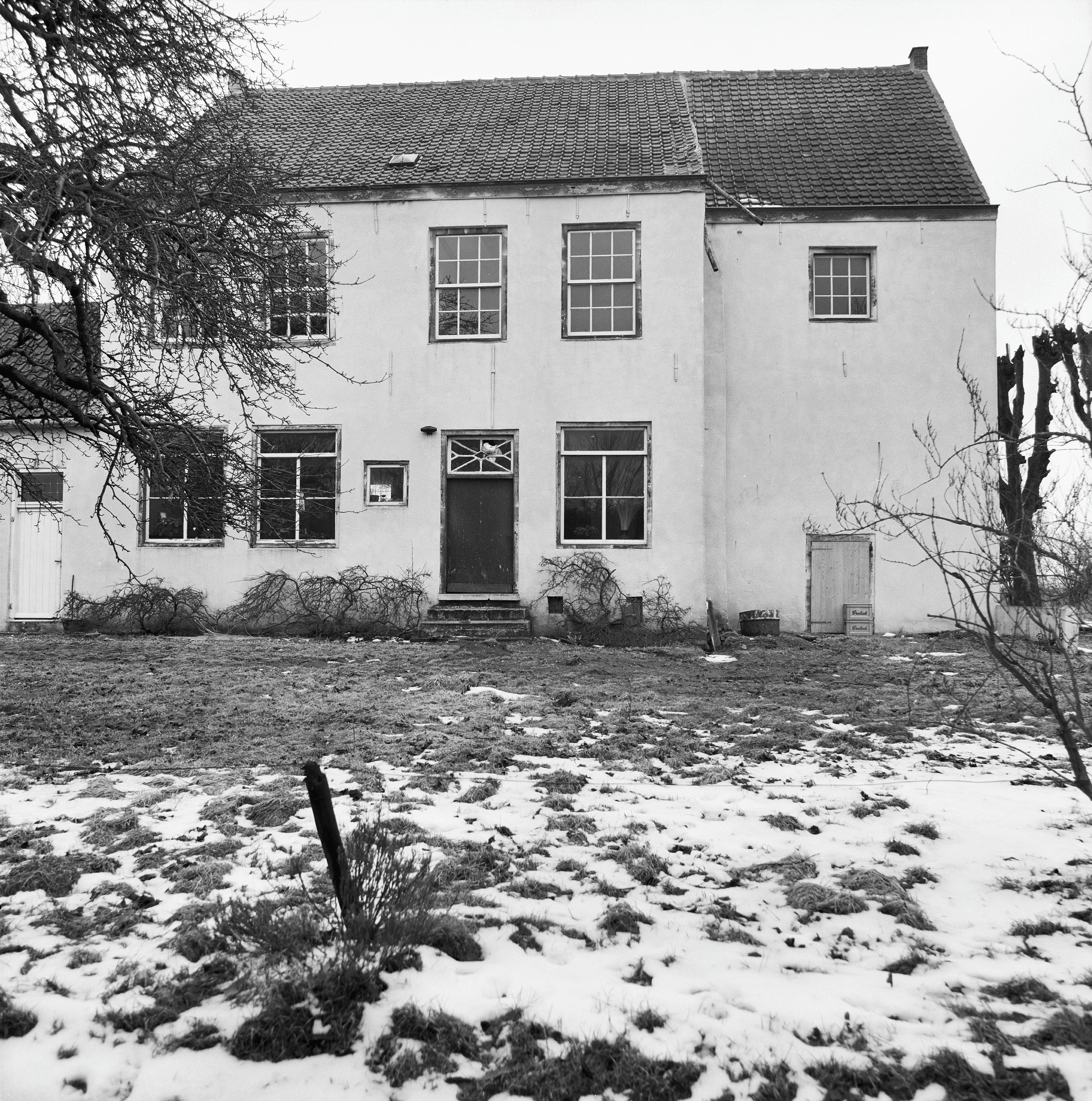
Villa Lettenburg
