= Lamswaarde =

- Village
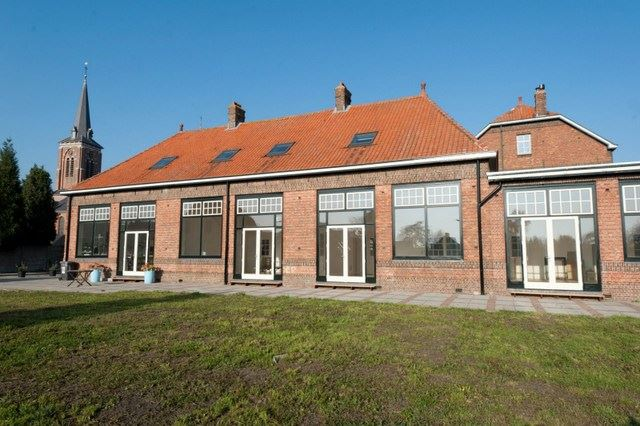
- Former school in Lanswaarde

- Flag

- Location in the province of Zeeland in the Netherlands Lamswaarde (Netherlands)
- Coordinates: 51°20′33″N 4°3′21″E
- Country: Netherlands
- Province: Zeeland
- Municipality: Hulst

Area
  - Total: 3.47 km^{2} (1.34 sq mi)
- Elevation: 0.5 m (1.6 ft)

Population (2021)
  - Total: 565
  - Density: 163/km^{2} (422/sq mi)
- Time zone: UTC+1 (CET)
  - Summer (DST): UTC+2 (CEST)
- Postal code: 4586
- Dialing code: 0114

Lamswaarde is a village in the Dutch province of Zeeland. It is a part of the municipality of Hulst and lies about 23 km southwest of Bergen op Zoom.

The village was first mentioned around 1260 as Lamswerd, and means "land on water belonging to Lam(bert)". Lamswaarde is a road village which developed in the 13th century near the outpost of the Cistercian monastery Baudeloo. The outpost was destroyed in the late 16th century during the Eighty Years' War. The village was flooded in 1578. 1615, a new dike was constructed around the Oostvogel and the land was poldered.

The Catholic St Cornelius was built between 1871 and 1873 to replace the barn church of 1686. It is a three-aisled basilica-like church. The Theresiagesticht was an orphanage constructed between 1925 and 1926. A matching girls' school was built next to the orphanage.

Lamswaarde was home to 405 people in 1840. The village used to be part of the municipality of Hontenisse. In 2002, it became part of the municipality of Hulst.

== Gallery ==
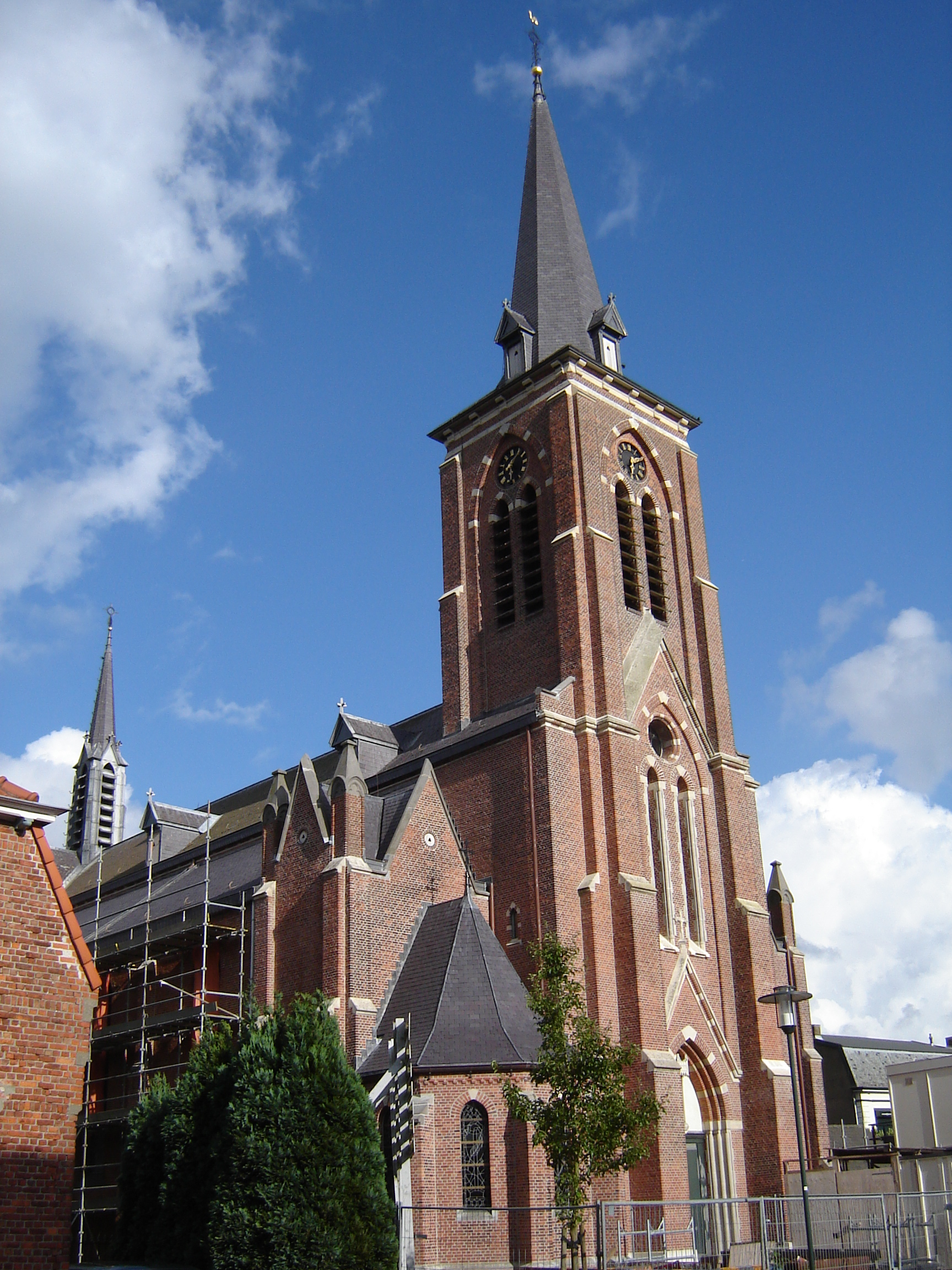
St Cornelius Church

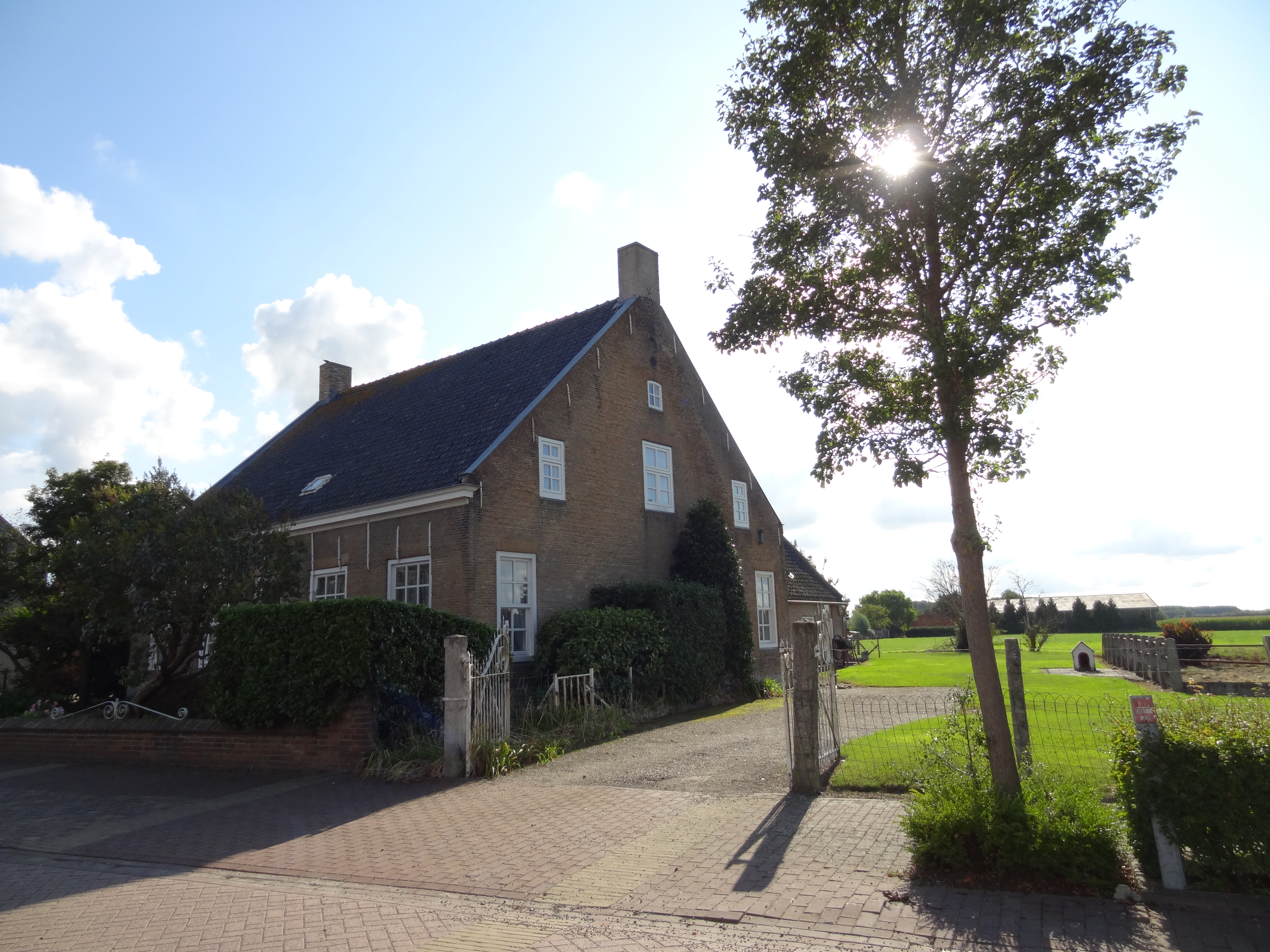
Farm in Lamswaarde

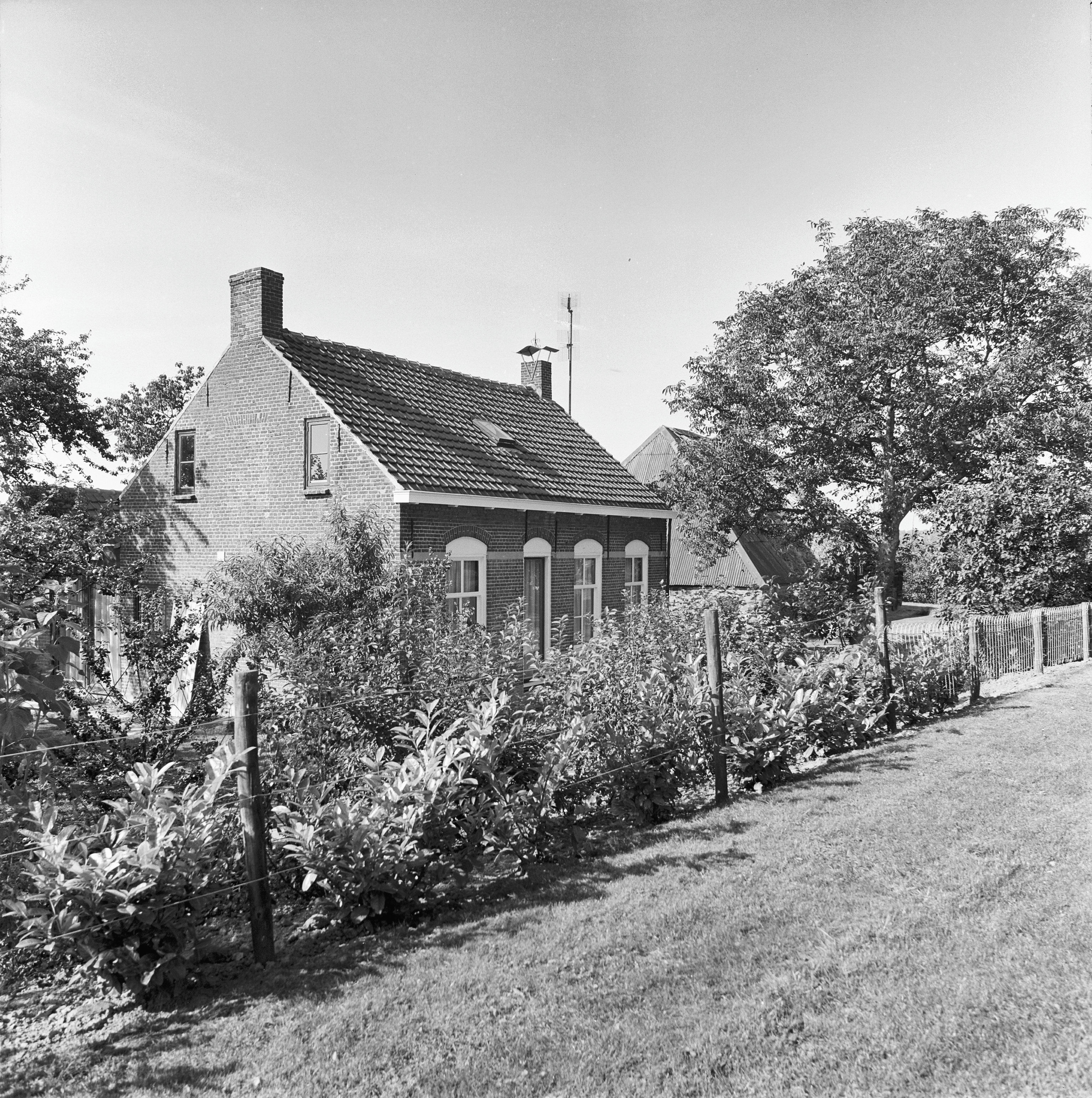
Farm in Lamswaarde

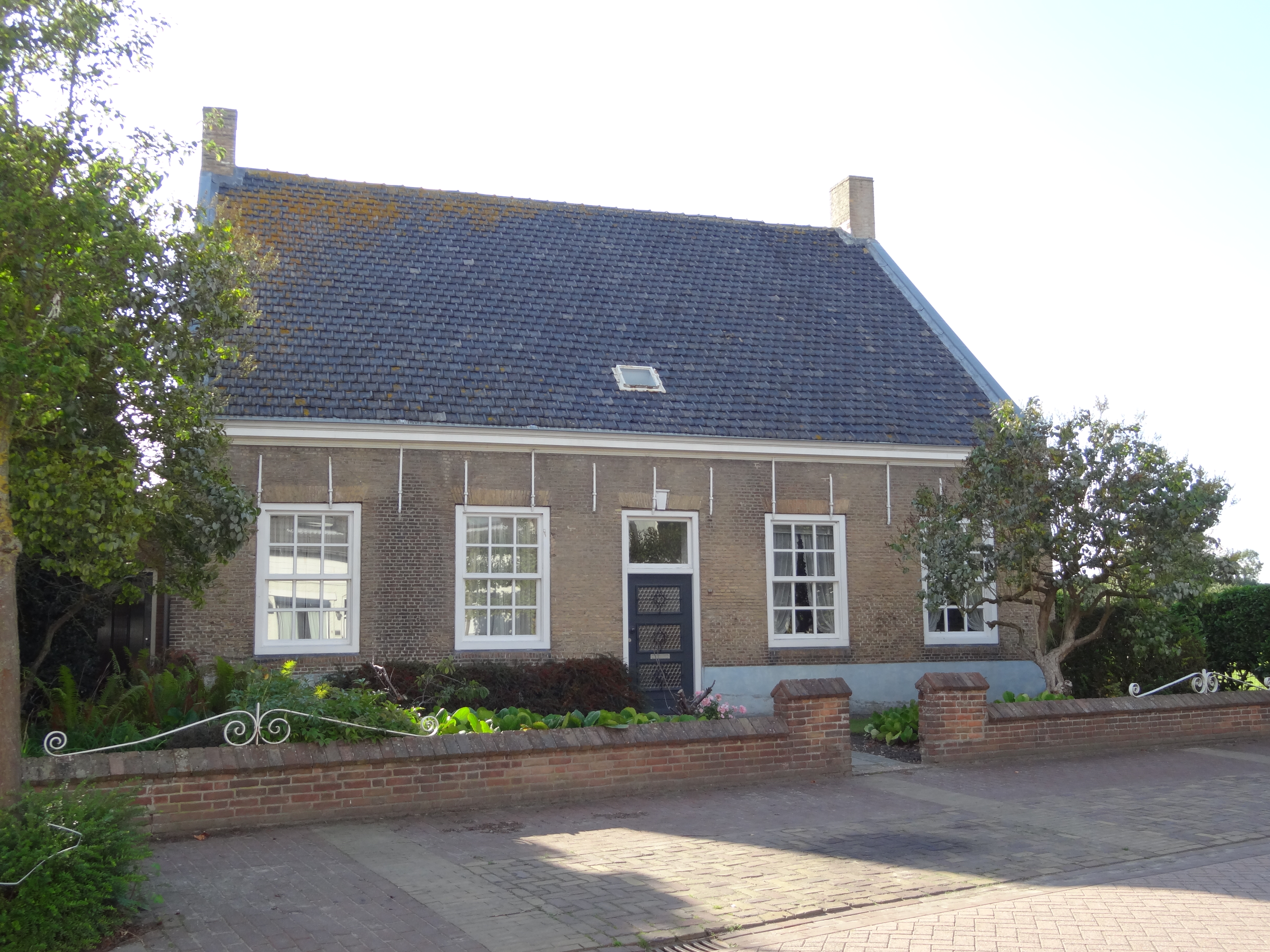
House in Lamswaarde
