= Zandberg, Zeeland =

Zandberg
- Hamlet
- Location in the province of Zeeland in the Netherlands Zandberg (Netherlands)
- Coordinates: 51°18′N 4°6′E
- Country: Netherlands
- Province: Zeeland
- Municipality: Hulst
- Time zone: UTC+1 (CET)
  - Summer (DST): UTC+2 (CEST)
- Postal code: 4569
- Dialing code: 0114

Zandberg is a hamlet in the Dutch province of Zeeland. It is a part of the municipality of Hulst, and lies about 24 km southwest of Bergen op Zoom.

Zandberg is not a statistical entity, and the postal authorities have placed it under Graauw. The hamlet has place name signs. It used to be home to 305 people in 1840. Nowadays, it consists of about 50 houses.
