= Walsoorden =

- Village
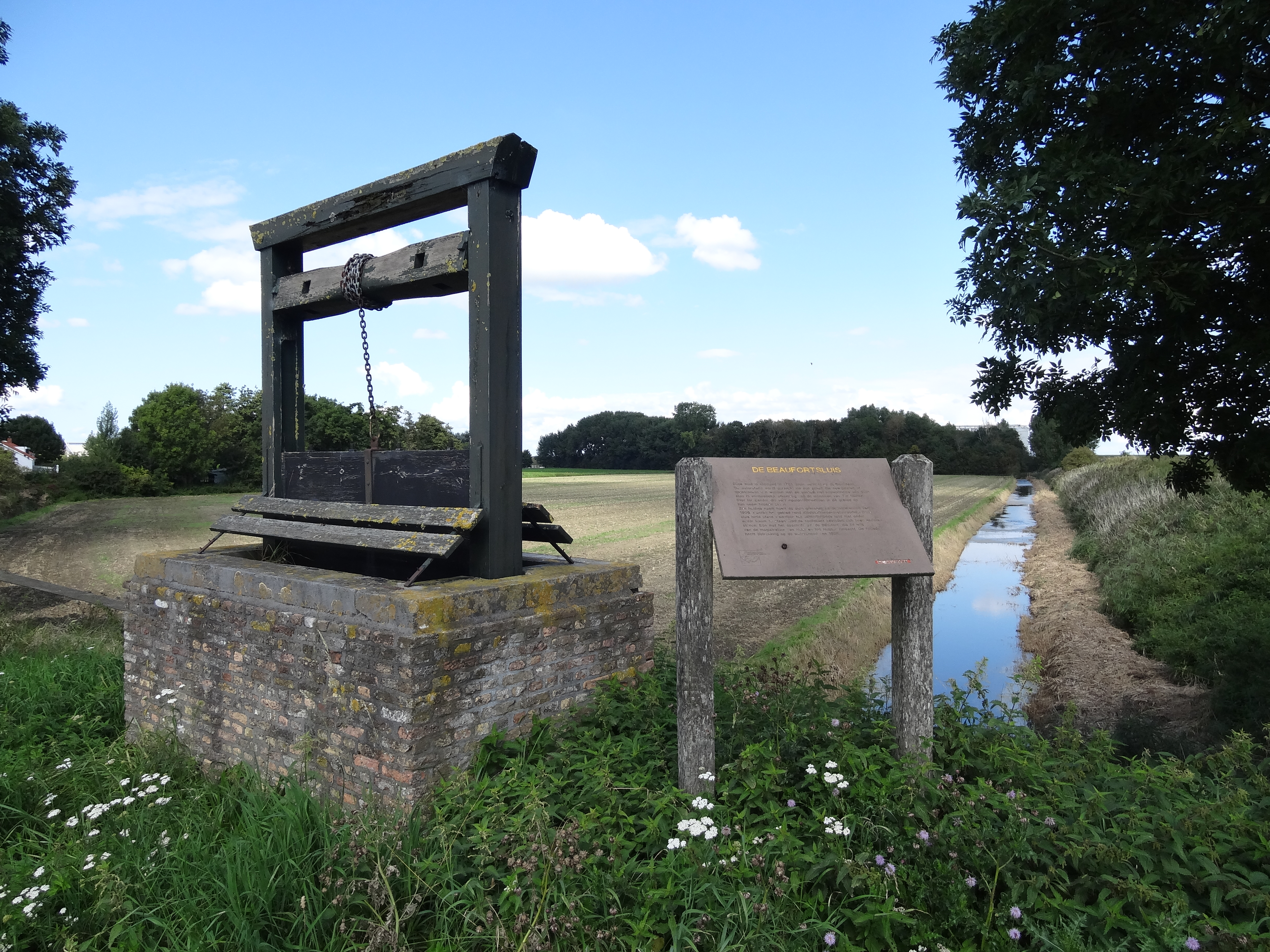
- The Beaufort Sluice

- Location in the province of Zeeland in the Netherlands Walsoorden (Netherlands)
- Coordinates: 51°22′57″N 4°1′42″E
- Country: Netherlands
- Province: Zeeland
- Municipality: Hulst

Area
  - Total: 7.19 km^{2} (2.78 sq mi)
- Elevation: 1.5 m (4.9 ft)

Population (2021)
  - Total: 335
  - Density: 46.6/km^{2} (121/sq mi)
- Time zone: UTC+1 (CET)
  - Summer (DST): UTC+2 (CEST)
- Postal code: 4588
- Dialing code: 0114

Walsoorden is a village in the Dutch province of Zeeland. It is a part of the municipality of Hulst, and lies about 22 km southwest of Bergen op Zoom.

The village was first mentioned in 1210 as Volcousthord, and means "land (near water) of the people of Wale (person)".

Walsoorden has one monument: the Beaufort sluice. It was built in 1761, and unlike other sluices, it does not have any doors, but uses a slide. The sluice is named after J.F. de Beaufort who was in charge of the water board. On 12 March 1906, large parts of Zeeland were flooded, but the sluice in Walsoorden managed to hold the water back.

Walsoorden was home to 99 people in 1840. The village used to be part of the municipality of Hontenisse. In 2003, it was merged into Hulst. The ferry from Kruiningen to Perkpolder used to be located near Walsoorden. It was replaced in 2003 by the Westerscheldetunnel.
