= Kapellebrug =

- Village
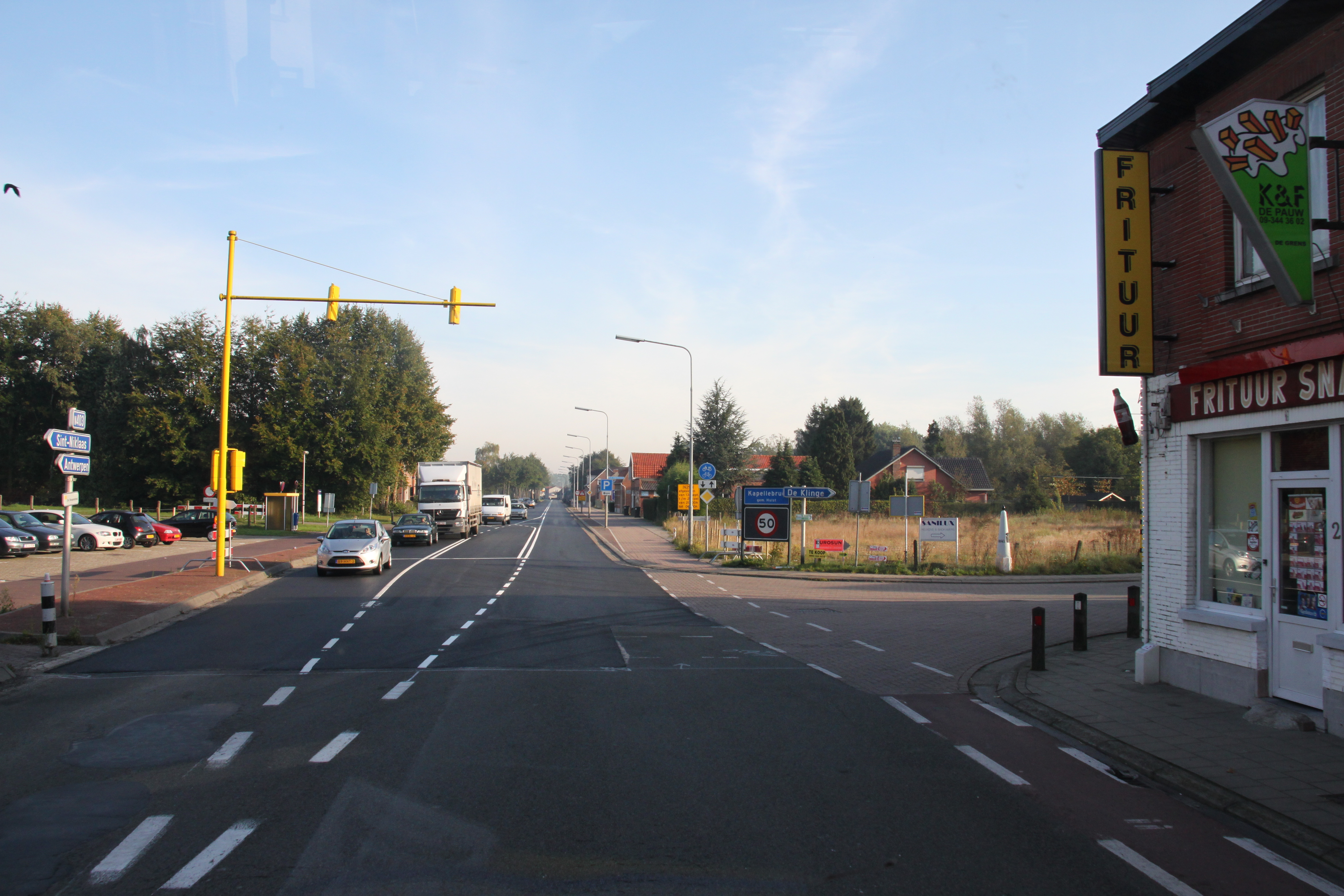
- Border at Kapellebrug

- Location in the province of Zeeland in the Netherlands Kapellebrug (Netherlands)
- Coordinates: 51°15′15″N 4°3′53″E
- Country: Netherlands
- Province: Zeeland
- Municipality: Hulst

Area
  - Total: 2.61 km^{2} (1.01 sq mi)
- Elevation: 2.1 m (6.9 ft)

Population (2021)
  - Total: 370
  - Density: 140/km^{2} (370/sq mi)
- Time zone: UTC+1 (CET)
  - Summer (DST): UTC+2 (CEST)
- Postal code: 4565
- Dialing code: 0114

Kapellebrug is a village in the Dutch province of Zeeland. It is a part of the municipality of Hulst, and lies about 31 km southwest of Bergen op Zoom.

The village was first mentioned in 1459 as ter Eecken, and is a combination of chapel and bridge.

Kapellebrug was home to 278 people in 1840. The village used to be split in the municipalities Sint Jansteen and Clinge. In 1970, it became part of the municipality of Hulst.
