= Absdale =

- Hamlet
- Absdale in the municipality of Hulst

- Location in the province of Zeeland in the Netherlands Absdale (Netherlands)
- Coordinates: 51°16′2″N 4°0′10″E
- Country: Netherlands
- Province: Zeeland
- Municipality: Hulst
- Time zone: UTC+1 (CET)
  - Summer (DST): UTC+2 (CEST)
- Postal code: 4561
- Dialing code: 0114

Absdale is a hamlet in the Dutch province of Zeeland. It is a part of the municipality of Hulst, and lies about 32 km southwest of Bergen op Zoom.

Absdale is not a statistical entity, and the postal authorities have placed it under Hulst. Absdale has place name signs. It used to be home to 550 people in 1840. Nowadays, it consists of about 40 houses.

The hamlet was first mentioned in 1315 as te Absdale, and means valley of the abbot which refers to the Ter Duinen Abbey. Absdale is mentioned in the poem Van den vos Reynaerde.
