= Ossenisse =

- Village
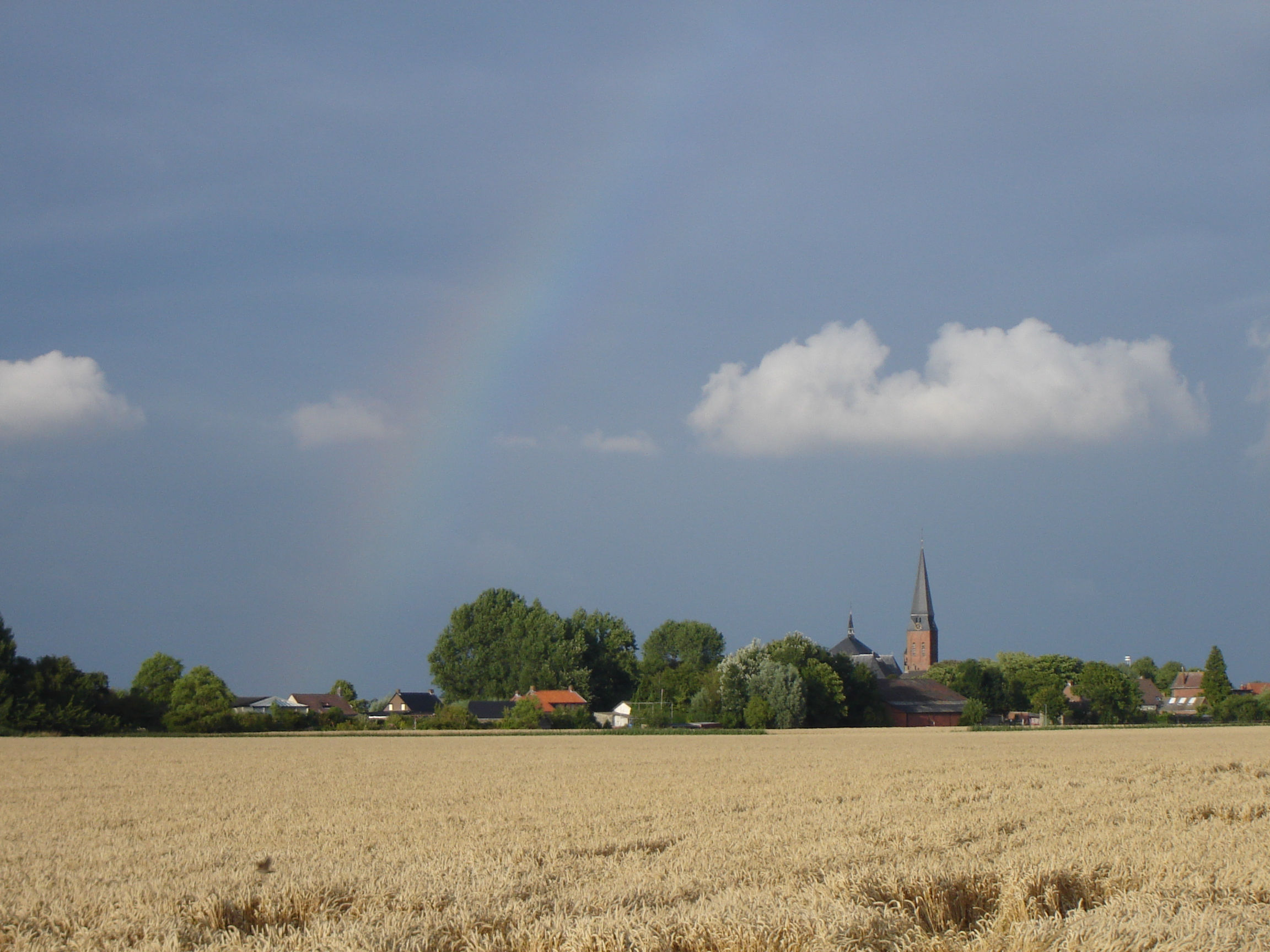
- View of Ossenisse with a faint rainbow

- Coat of arms

- Location in the province of Zeeland in the Netherlands Ossenisse (Netherlands)
- Coordinates: 51°23′18″N 3°58′40″E
- Country: Netherlands
- Province: Zeeland
- Municipality: Hulst

Area
  - Total: 11.69 km^{2} (4.51 sq mi)
- Elevation: 0.7 m (2.3 ft)

Population (2021)
  - Total: 310
  - Density: 27/km^{2} (69/sq mi)
- Time zone: UTC+1 (CET)
  - Summer (DST): UTC+2 (CEST)
- Postal code: 4589
- Dialing code: 0114

Ossenisse is a village in the Dutch province of Zeeland. It is a part of the municipality of Hulst, and lies about 24 km west of Bergen op Zoom.

== History ==
The village was first mentioned in 1164 as Osnesse, and is a combination of headland and oxen (cattle). Ossenisse is road village which developed on salt marsh. In 1183, it was a possession of the monastery of Coesvoorde. In 1196, the ownership was transferred to the Cistercian monastery Ten Duinen. In 1225, the village was lost in a flood. In 1610, a dike was built around the area.

The Catholic St Willibrordus Church is a three-aisled cruciform church which was built between 1914 and 1915. In 2004, the church was converted into residential homes.

Ossenisse was home to 782 people in 1840. The village was a separate municipality until 1936, when it was merged with Vogelwaarde. The dike broke during the North Sea flood of 1953 and the village was flooded. In 2003, it became part of the municipality of Hulst. There used to be a ferry between Kruiningen and Perkpolder. In 2003, the Westerscheldetunnel was opened and the ferry ceased. The village has become isolated due to the termination of the ferry.

== Gallery ==
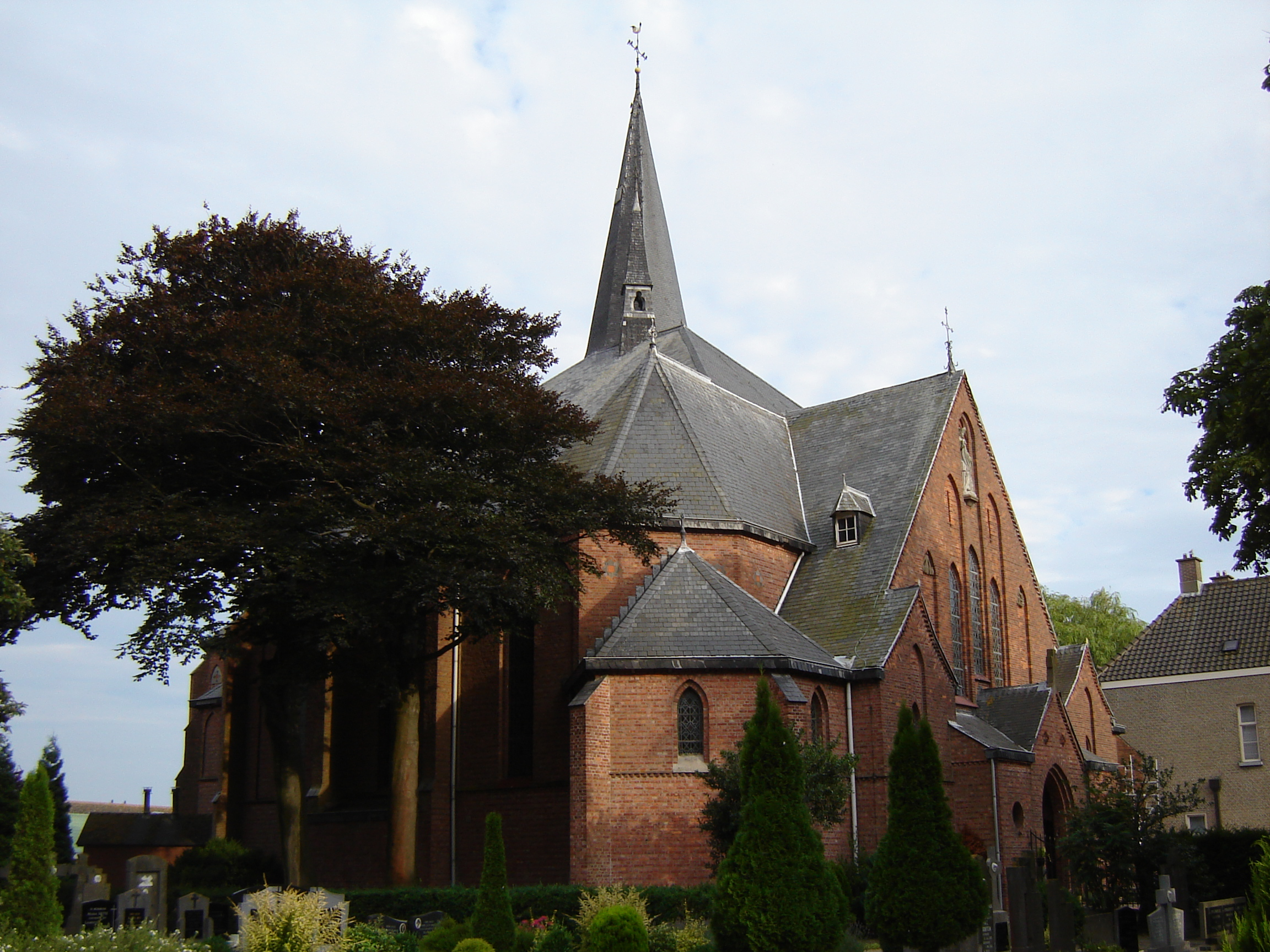
St Willibrordus Church
