= Hengstdijk =

- Village
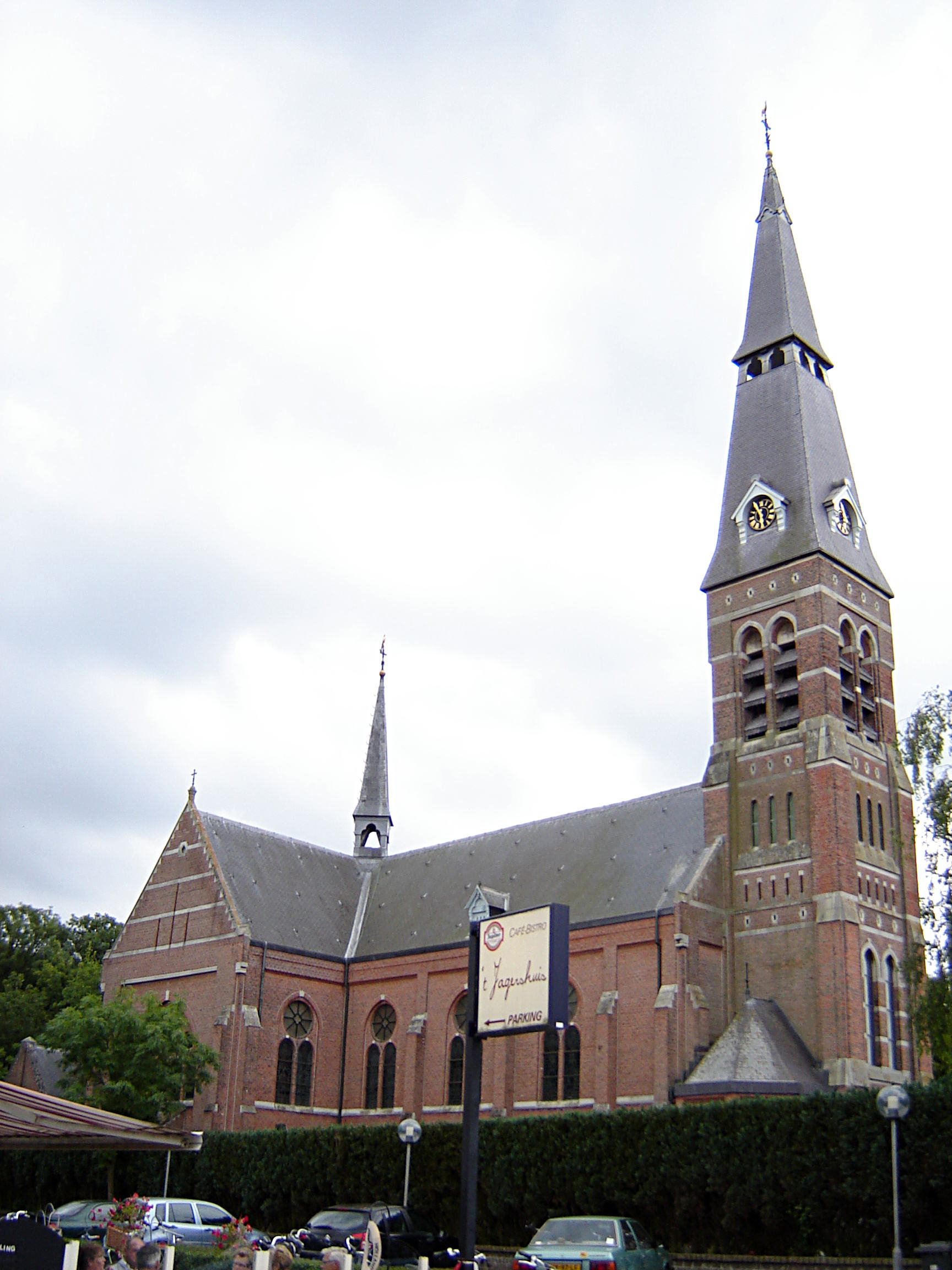
- St Catharina Church

- Coat of arms

- Location in the province of Zeeland in the Netherlands Hengstdijk (Netherlands)
- Coordinates: 51°20′36″N 3°59′43″E
- Country: Netherlands
- Province: Zeeland
- Municipality: Hulst
- Established: 1161

Area
  - Total: 15.38 km^{2} (5.94 sq mi)
- Elevation: 0.2 m (0.66 ft)

Population (2021)
  - Total: 710
  - Density: 46/km^{2} (120/sq mi)
- Time zone: UTC+1 (CET)
  - Summer (DST): UTC+2 (CEST)
- Postal code: 4585
- Dialing code: 0114

Hengstdijk is a village in the Dutch province of Zeeland. It is a part of the municipality of Hulst, and lies about 26 km southwest of Bergen op Zoom.

The village was first mentioned in 1161 as Hencsdic, and means "dike of Henge (person)". Hengstdijk is a dike village which was founded on the bank of the De Vogel Creek in 1161.

The Catholic St Catharina is a single aisled church with a needle spire which was constructed between 1892 and 1893. It was restored in 1977.

Hengstdijk was home to 670 people in 1840. It was a separate municipality until 1936 when it became part of the municipality of Vogelwaarde. In 2003, the village became part of the municipality of Hulst.
