= Sint Jansteen =

- Village
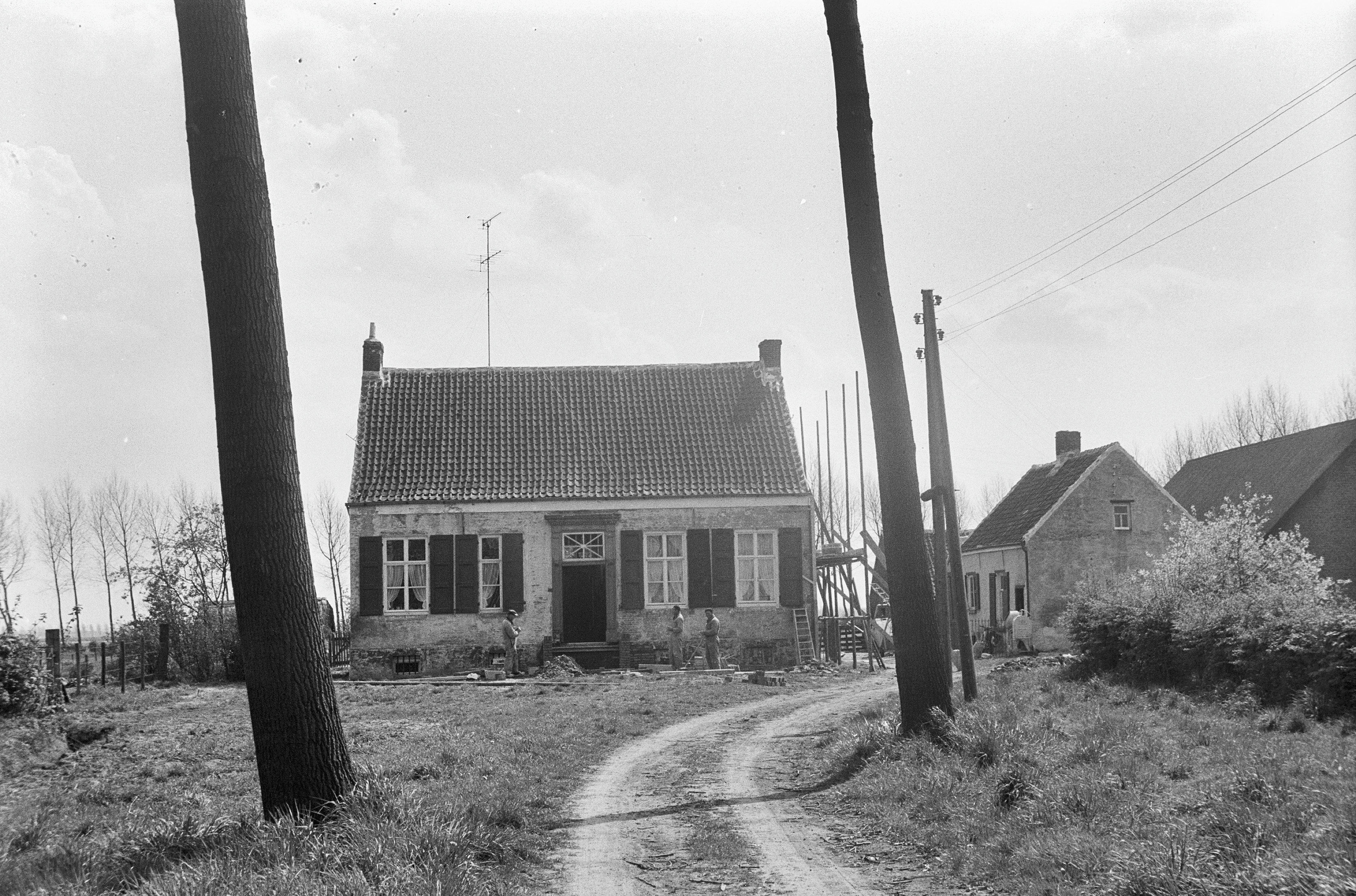
- Sint Jansteen (1967)

- Flag Coat of arms

- Location in the province of Zeeland in the Netherlands Sint Jansteen (Netherlands)
- Coordinates: 51°15′48″N 4°3′4″E
- Country: Netherlands
- Province: Zeeland
- Municipality: Hulst

Area
  - Total: 4.45 km^{2} (1.72 sq mi)
- Elevation: 2.5 m (8.2 ft)

Population (2021)
  - Total: 3,180
  - Density: 715/km^{2} (1,850/sq mi)
- Time zone: UTC+1 (CET)
  - Summer (DST): UTC+2 (CEST)
- Postal code: 4564
- Dialing code: 0114

Sint Jansteen is a village in the Dutch province of Zeeland. It is a part of the municipality of Hulst, and lies about 31 km southwest of Bergen op Zoom.

== History ==
The village was first mentioned in 1248 as Sancti Ioannis ad Lapidem, and means "stone building dedicated to John the Baptist". The stone building refers to a castle which has been known to exists since 1170, and contained a chapel dedicated to John the Baptist. Sint Jansteen is a road village which was a free heerlijkheid (=not a fief).

Sint Jansteen was completely demolished on the order of Lt General Pieter de la Rocque, in preparation against the French attack on Hulst during the Austrian Succession War in 1747. De la Rocque was later arrested and sentenced to life imprisonment for his war crimes in Loevestein Castle.

The St John the Baptist church is a three-aisled church with needle spire which was constructed between 1857 and 1860. The ridge turret was removed in 1996. The former town hall was built in 1790 as a courthouse.

Sint Jansteen was home to 708 people in 1840. Sint Jansteen was a separate municipality until 1970, when it was merged with Hulst.

== Gallery ==
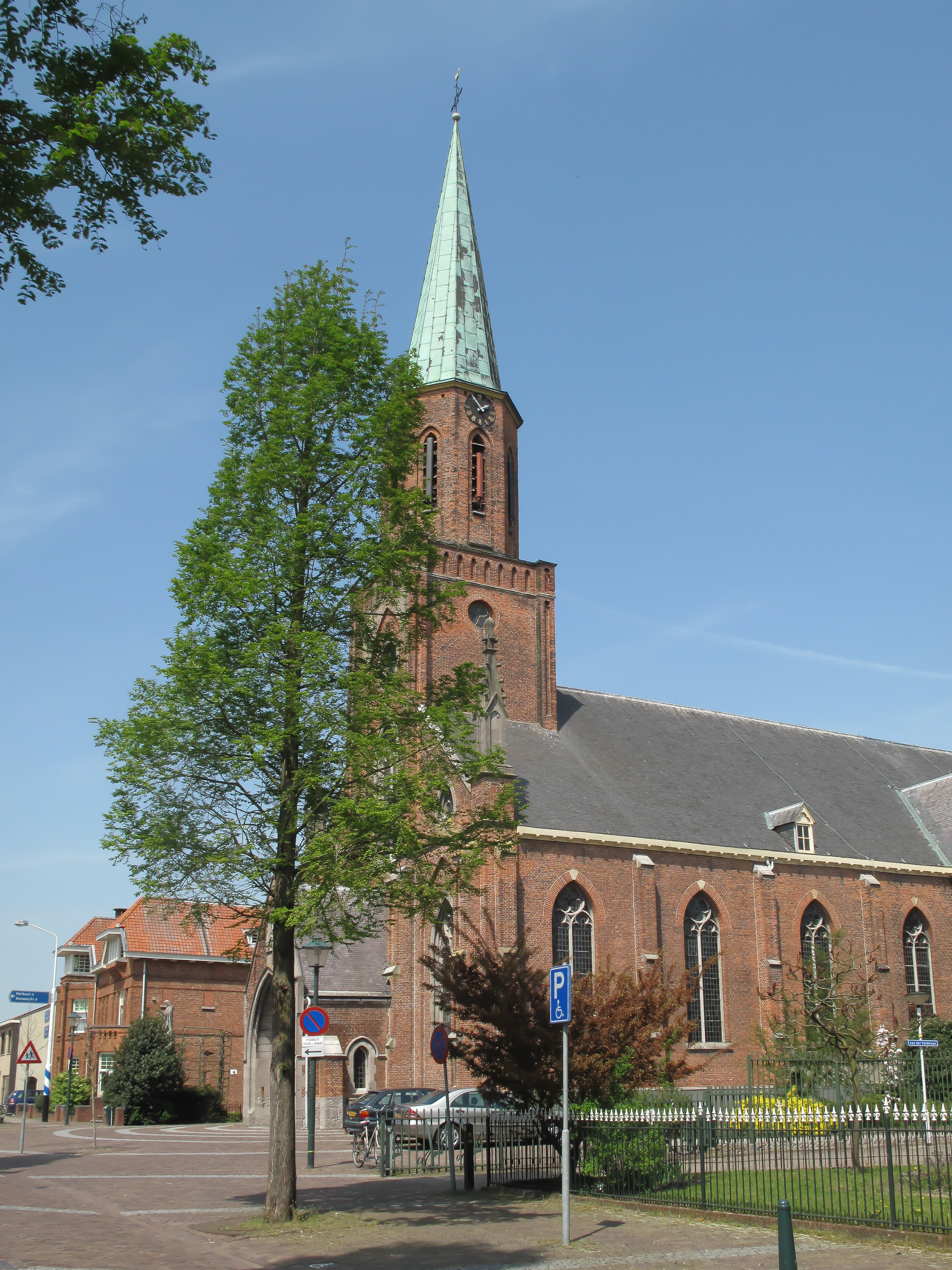
Sint Jansteen, church: de Sint Johannes de Doperkerk
