= Graauw =

- Village
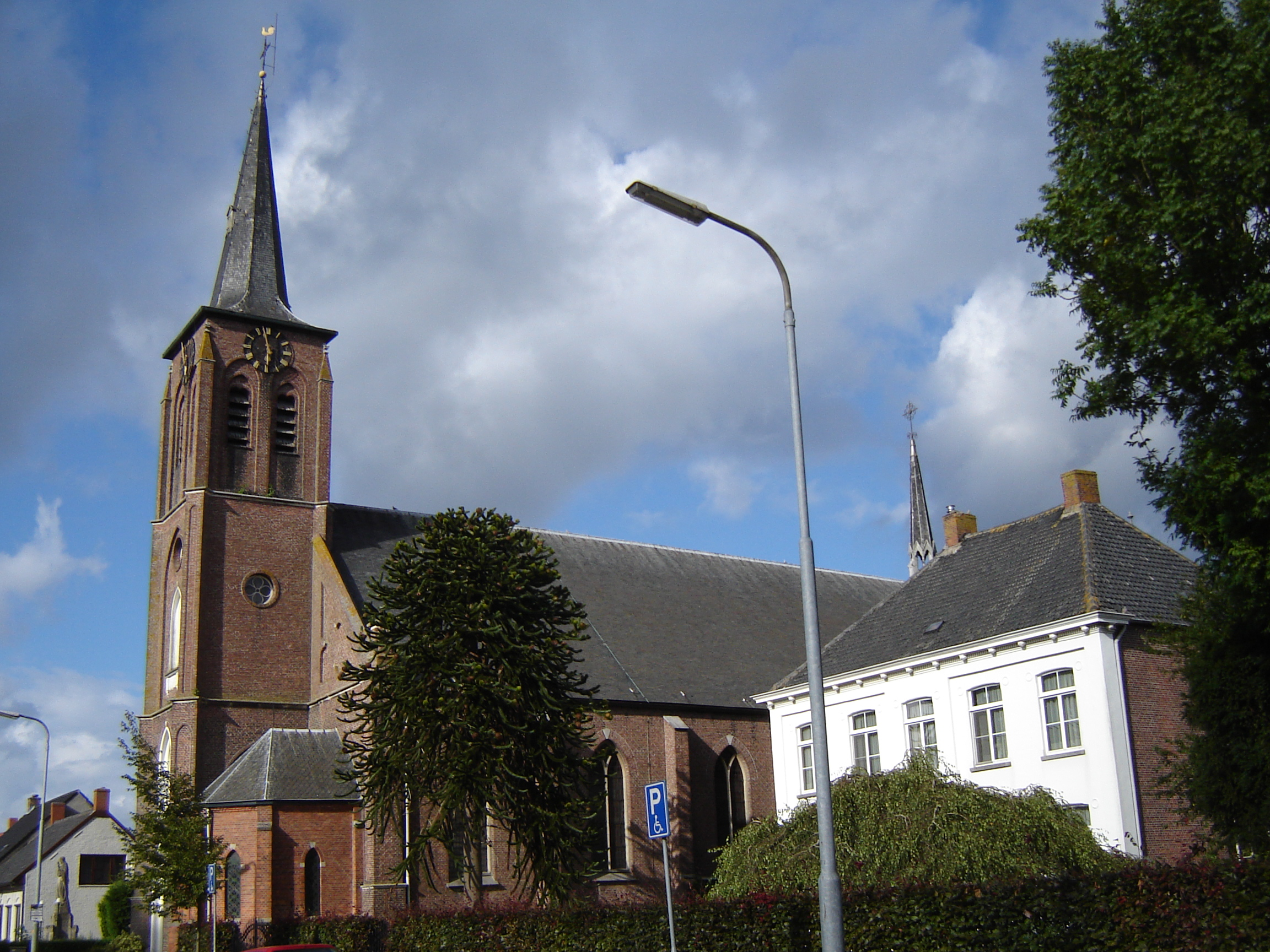
- Assumption of Mary Church

- Coat of arms

- Location in the province of Zeeland in the Netherlands Graauw (Netherlands)
- Coordinates: 51°19′40″N 4°6′8″E
- Country: Netherlands
- Province: Zeeland
- Municipality: Hulst

Area
  - Total: 19.08 km^{2} (7.37 sq mi)
- Elevation: 0.6 m (2.0 ft)

Population (2021)
  - Total: 860
  - Density: 45/km^{2} (120/sq mi)
- Time zone: UTC+1 (CET)
  - Summer (DST): UTC+2 (CEST)
- Postal code: 4569
- Dialing code: 0114

Graauw is a village in the Dutch province of Zeeland. It is a part of the municipality of Hulst, and lies about 22 km southwest of Bergen op Zoom.

== History ==
The village was first mentioned in 1170 as Grotha and means "slipped land outside the dike". Same root word as "to grow". Graauw is a dike village with developed along the Graauwse Kreek. The oldest settlement was lost in flood. In the late 16th century, the land was poldered and village developed on the dike. In 1852, the Van Alsteinpolder was created, and a new harbour was created to north in 1878 near the hamlet of Paal.

The Catholic Assumption of Mary Church is a three-aisled basilica like church which was constructed between 1854 and 1855.

Graauw was home to 812 people in 1840. It was the capital of the municipality of the Graauw en Langendam until 1970 when it was merged into Hulst.

== Gallery ==
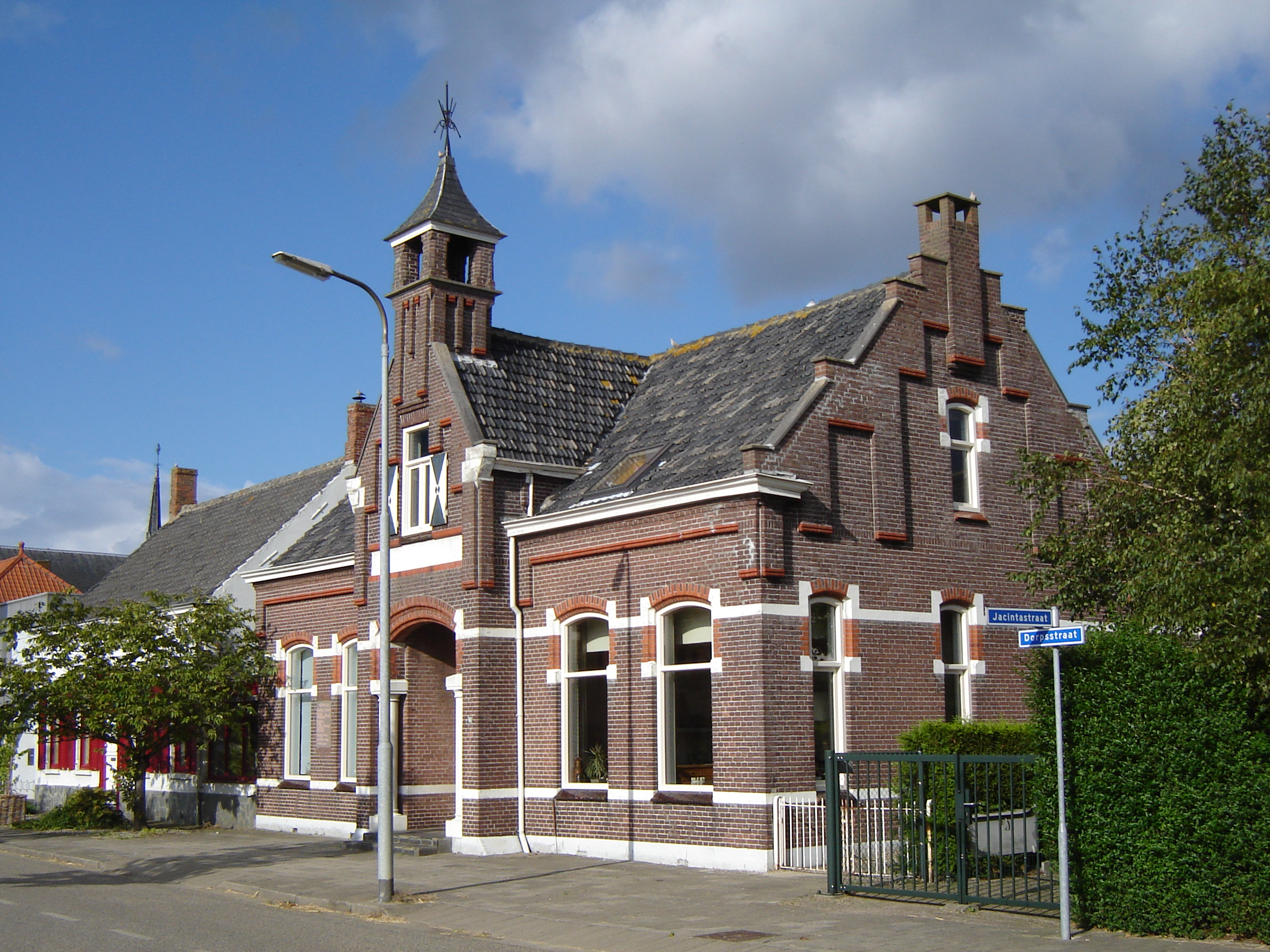
Former town hall

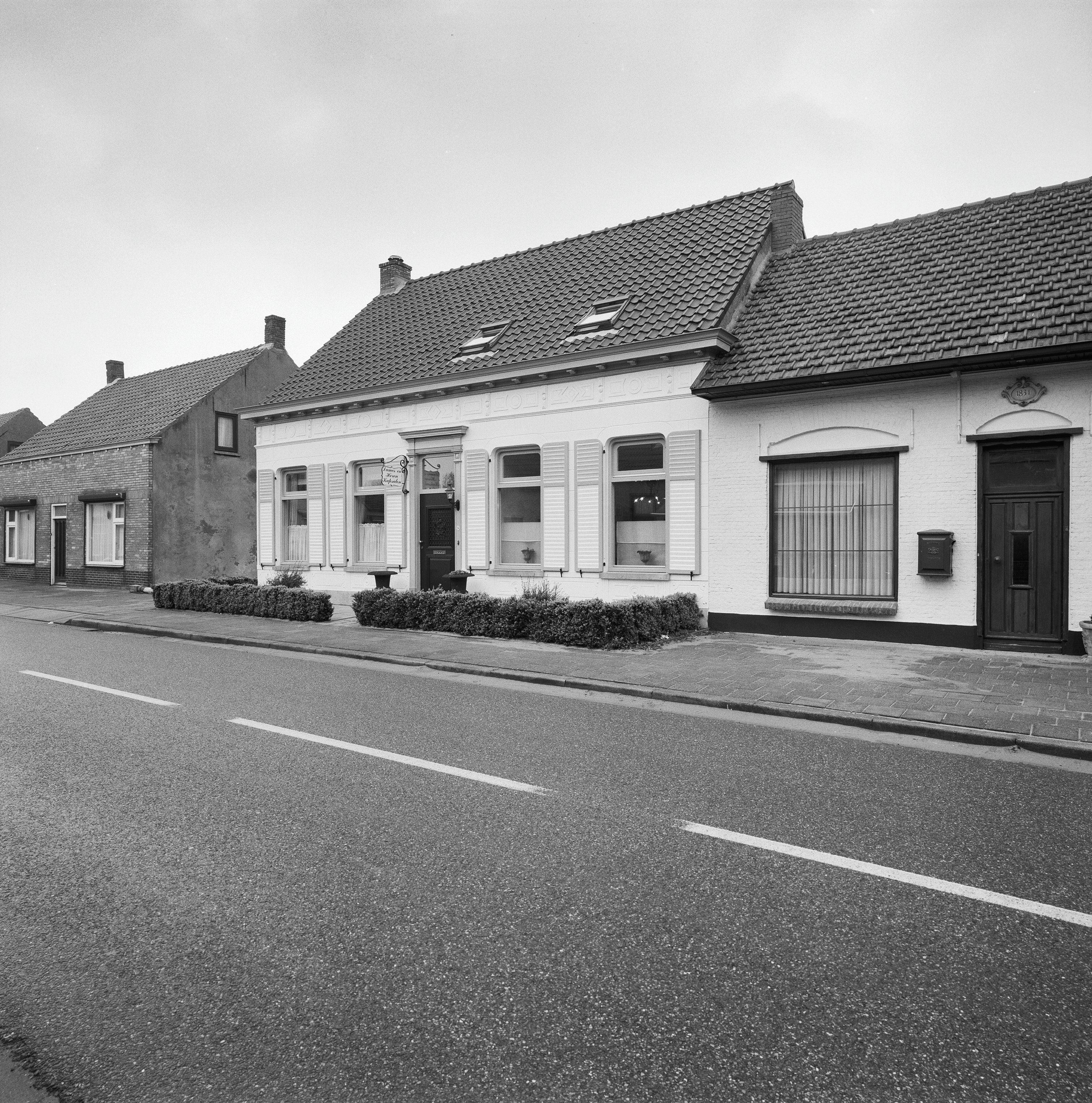
Houses in Graauw
