= Hulst =

- City and Municipality
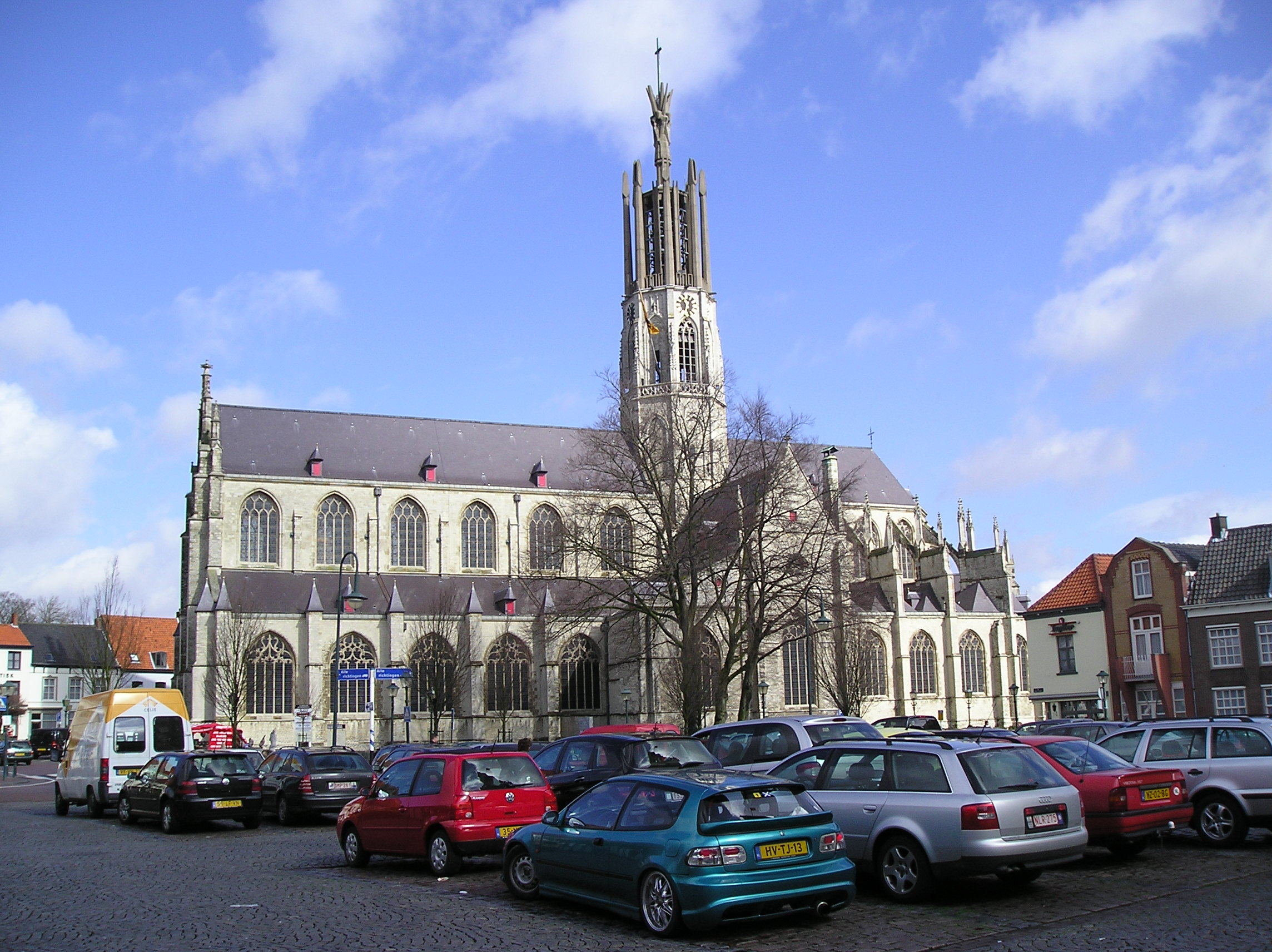
- Basilica of Hulst in 2006

- Flag Coat of arms

- Location in the province of Zeeland in the Netherlands Hulst (Netherlands)
- Coordinates: 51°17′N 4°3′E
- Country: Netherlands
- Province: Zeeland

Government
  - Body: Municipal council
  - Mayor: Ilona Jense-van Haarst (VVD)

Area
  - Total: 251.82 km^{2} (97.23 sq mi)
  - Land: 201.71 km^{2} (77.88 sq mi)
  - Water: 50.11 km^{2} (19.35 sq mi)
- Elevation: 3 m (9.8 ft)

Population (January 2021)
  - Total: 27,575
  - Density: 137/km^{2} (350/sq mi)
- Demonym: Hulstenaar
- Time zone: UTC+1 (CET)
  - Summer (DST): UTC+2 (CEST)
- Postcode: 4560–4569, 4580–4589
- Area code: 0114
- Website: www.gemeentehulst.nl

Hulst (Dutch pronunciation: [ɦʏlst]) is a municipality and city in southwestern Netherlands in the east of Zeelandic Flanders.

== History ==
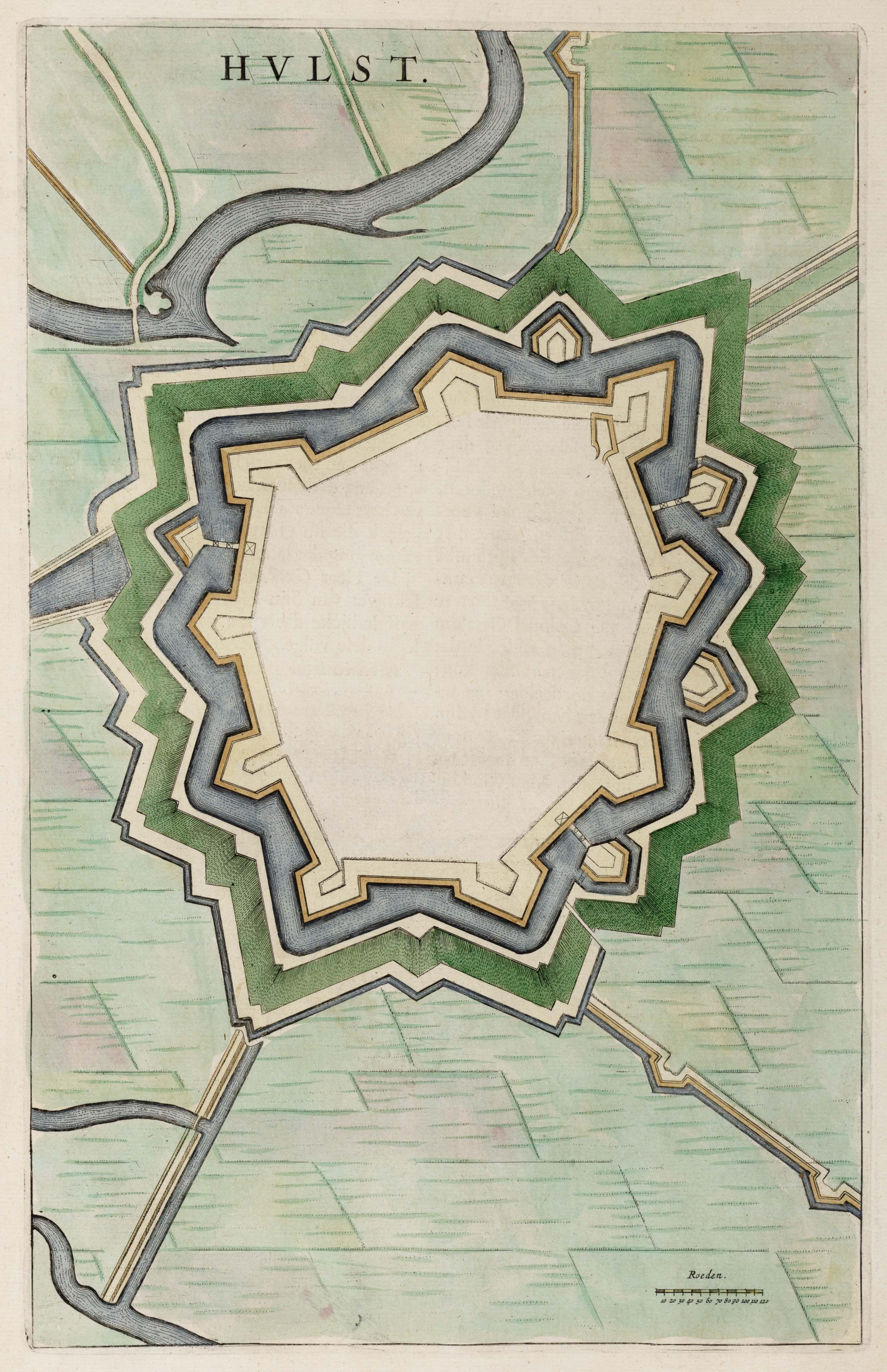
Map of the star fort

Hulst received city rights in the 12th century.

Hulst was captured from the Spanish in 1591 by Maurice of Orange but was recaptured by Archduke Albert in 1596.

In 1640, the Dutch forces tried to conquer the city, but they were defeated in battle by the Spanish Army under Cardinal-Infante Ferdinand, and Frederick Henry was forced to retreat.

In 1645, the Siege of Hulst (to control the left bank of the Schelde river) occurred. It was led by Prince of Orange Frederick Henry, during the Eighty Years' War (1568–1648) with Spain.

In 1702 Vauban attacked the town, but failled to capture it, which makes it the only fortress to successfully resist that great engineer. In 1747 it was taken by the French after incompetent defence by Lt. General Pieter de la Rocque.

In the seventeenth century, a star fort was constructed. The fortifications, constructed during that time, are historic examples of Dutch fortress architecture.

The name Hulst (Holly in English) would appear to come from the shape of the battlements. Holly is depicted growing around the towns crest.

== Geography ==
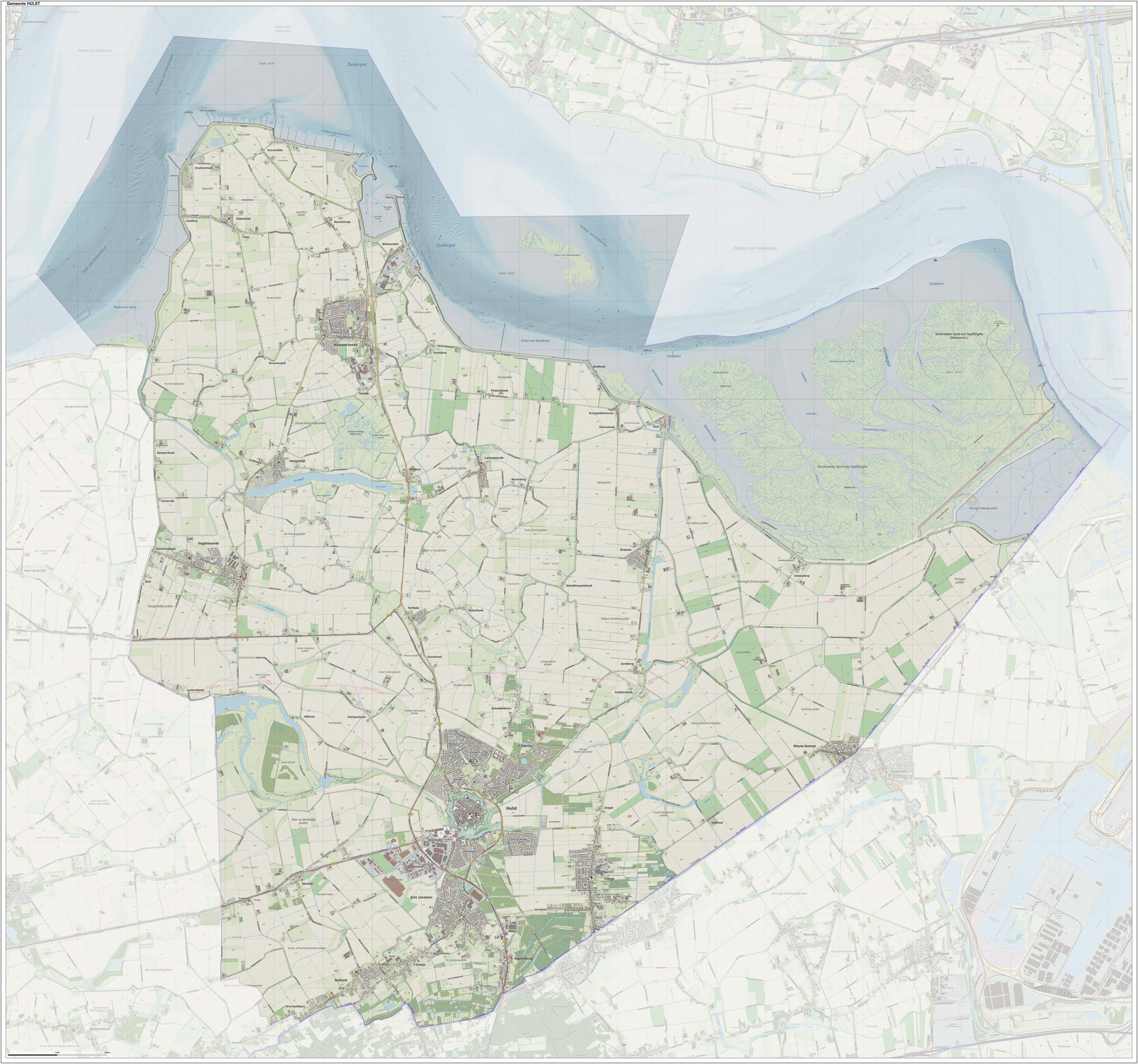
Dutch Topographic map of the municipality of Hulst, June 2015

Hulst is located at 51°17′N 4°3′E in the south of the province of Zeeland in the southwest of the Netherlands. It is situated in the east of the region Zeelandic Flanders, which is connected by land only to Belgium, on the Dutch-Belgian border.

Hulst is neighbouring the municipalities of Terneuzen in the west, Stekene (Belgium) and Sint-Gillis-Waas (B) in the south, Beveren (B) in the east, and Reimerswaal in the north. The river Western Scheldt separates the land of Reimerswaal and Hulst.

The Drowned Land of Saeftinghe (Verdronken land van Saeftinghe) is a natural reserve in the north of the municipality. Its name refers to the Saeftinghe legend.

The population centers in the municipality are:

- Absdale
- Clinge
- Graauw
- Heikant
- Hengstdijk
- Hulst
- Kapellebrug
- Kloosterzande
- Kuitaart
- Lamswaarde
- Nieuw-Namen
- Ossenisse
- Sint Jansteen
- Terhole
- Vogelwaarde
- Walsoorden
- Zandberg

== Government ==
The mayor of Hulst is Ilona Jense-van Haarst of the VVD. The former mayor is Jan-Frans Mulder of the Christian Democratic Appeal.

== Culture ==
Since June 2018, the city has its own letter artwork (a local variation on the capital's I Amsterdam). This work of art can be seen in turns at various locations in the municipality. The underlying idea is that the h at the beginning of a word is not pronounced in the Zeelandic / East Flemish dialect. By combining the letters n and h (in white and green) you can read the text in ulst in addition to i hulst. Under this concept in ulst, a campaign for and branding of the city of Hulst was launched simultaneously.

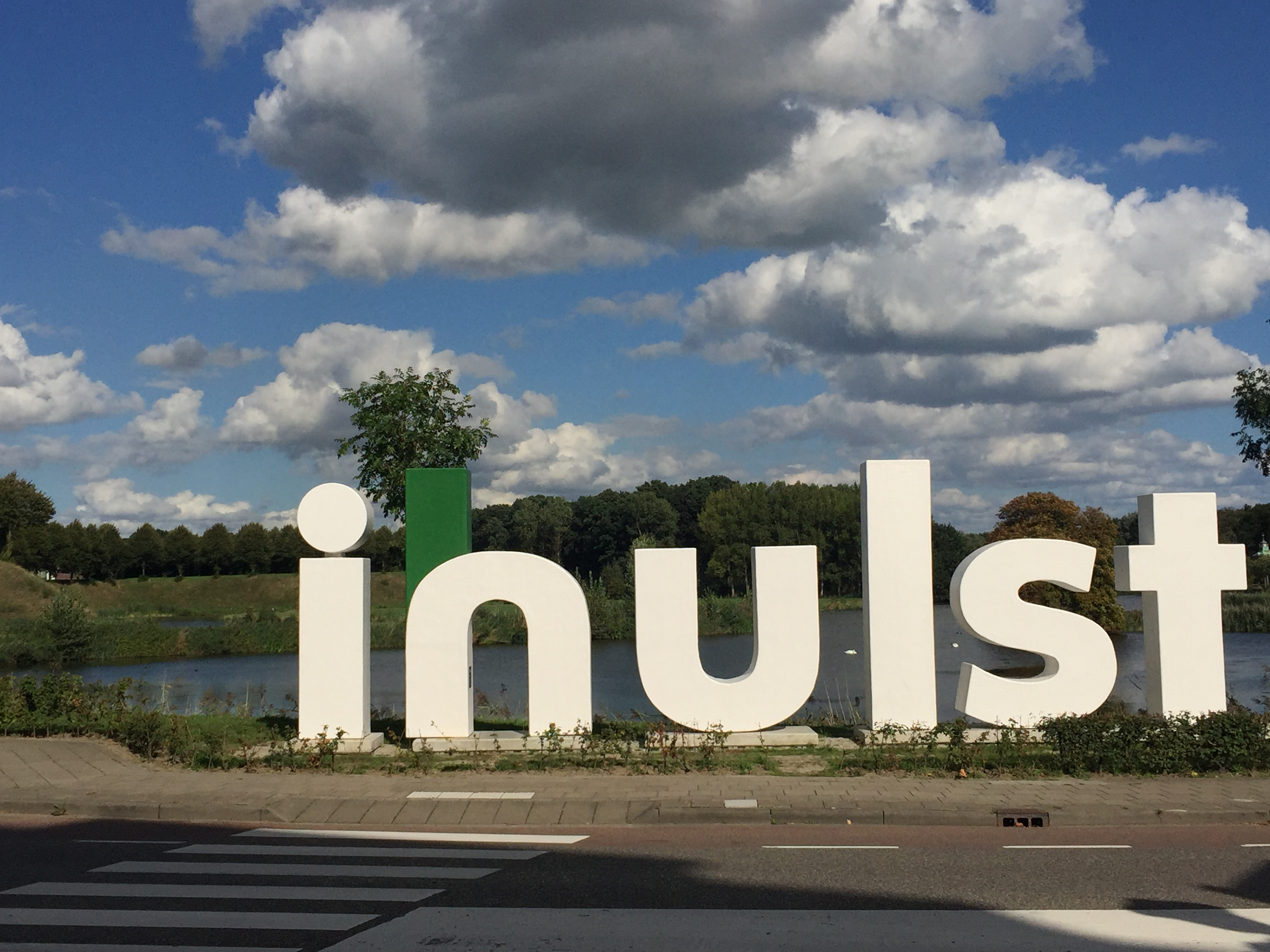

Letter artwork for the city of Hulst

== International relations ==
Hulst is twinned with

- Michelstadt, Hesse, Germany.

== Notable people ==
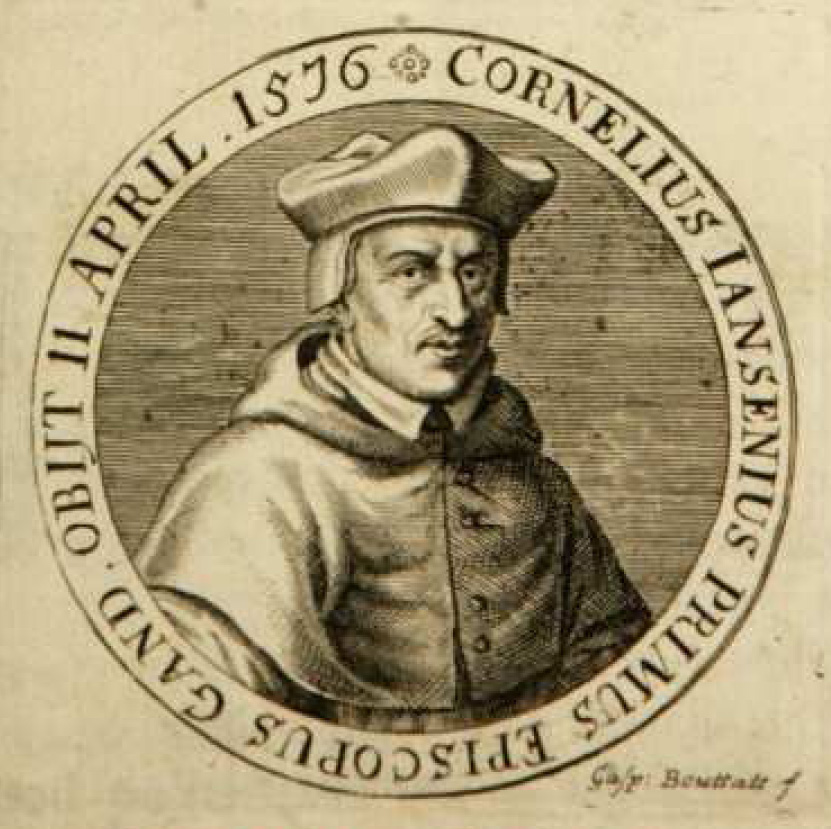
Cornelius Jansen

- Johannes Crabbe (c. 1420–1 November 1488), abbot, Imperial counsellor and bibliophile.
- Cornelius Jansen (1510 in Hulst – 1576) was a Catholic exegete and the first Bishop of Ghent
- Gillis Mostaert (the Elder) (1528 in Hulst – 1598) a Flemish Renaissance painter and draughtsman
- Frans Mostaert (1528 in Hulst – 1560) a Flemish Renaissance painter specializing in landscape paintings
- Valentin de Lannoy a Flemish military commander and governor of Hulst in 1623
- Cornelis de Vos (1584 in Hulst – 1651) a Flemish painter, draughtsman and art dealer
- Paul de Vos (ca.1591/92 in Hulst – 1678) a Flemish Baroque painter of animals, hunting scenes and still lifes
- Pieter Nuyts (1598 in Middelburg – 1655) a Dutch explorer, diplomat and politician
- Pieter Nuyts (1640 in Middelburg – 1709) a Dutch poet and dramatist
- Theo Middelkamp (1914 in Nieuw-Namen – 2005) a Dutch cyclist, world champion in 1947

== Gallery ==
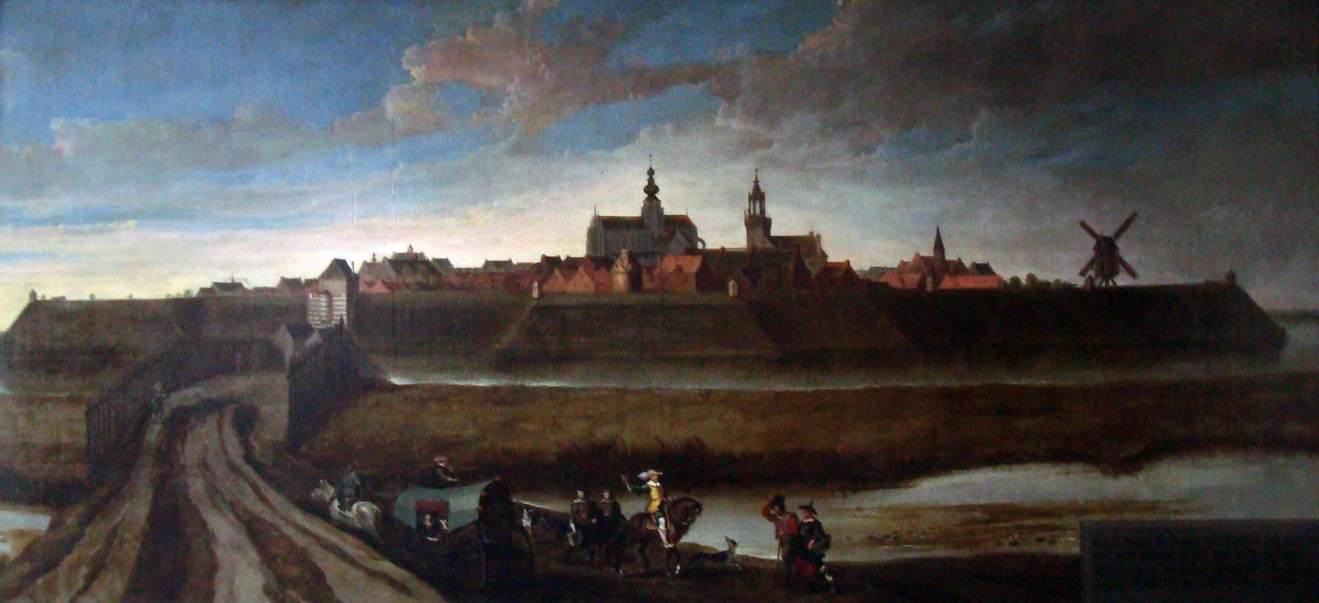
View of Hulst painted in 1628 by Cornelis de Vos

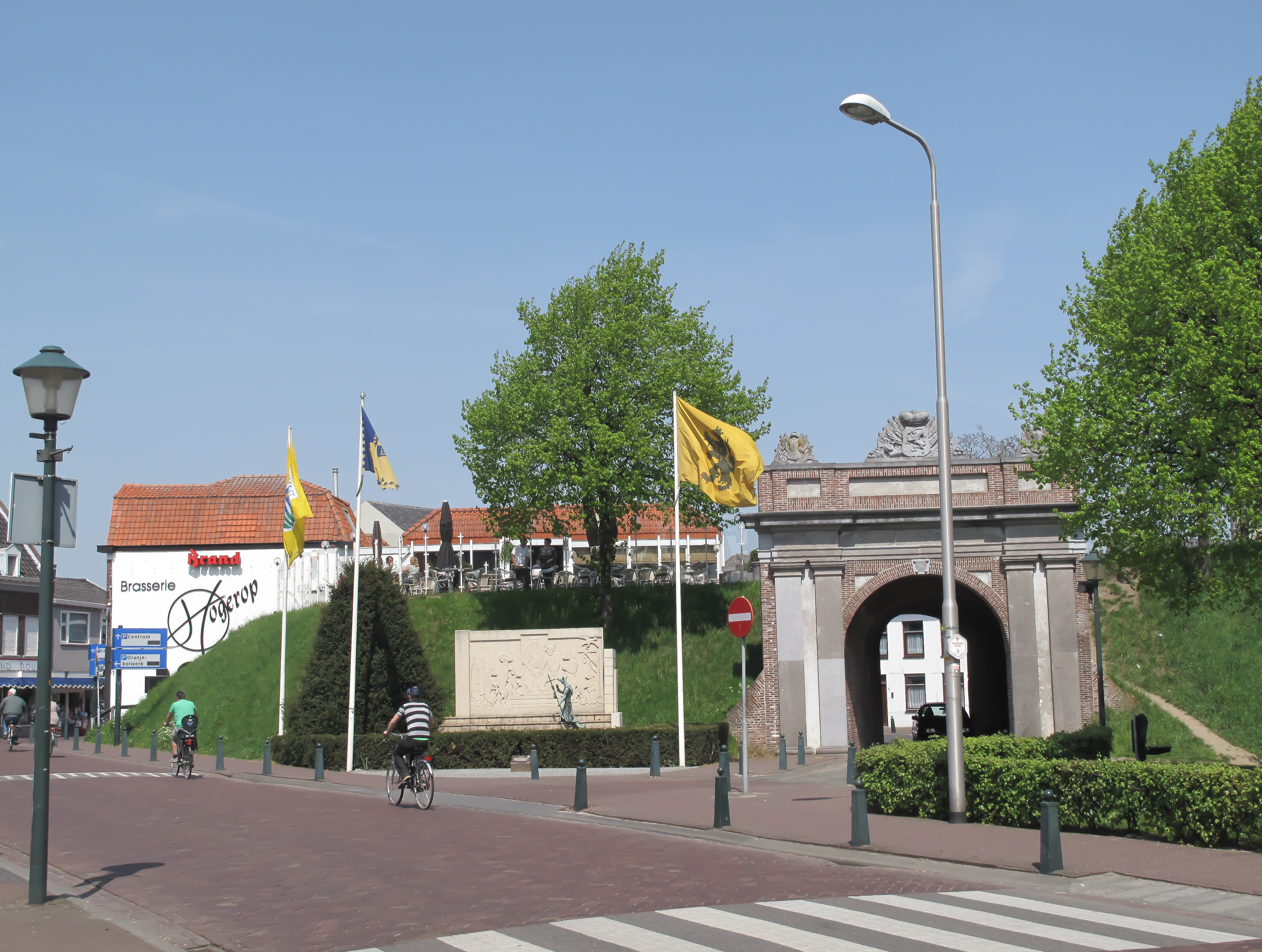
Gate (de Gentse Poort)

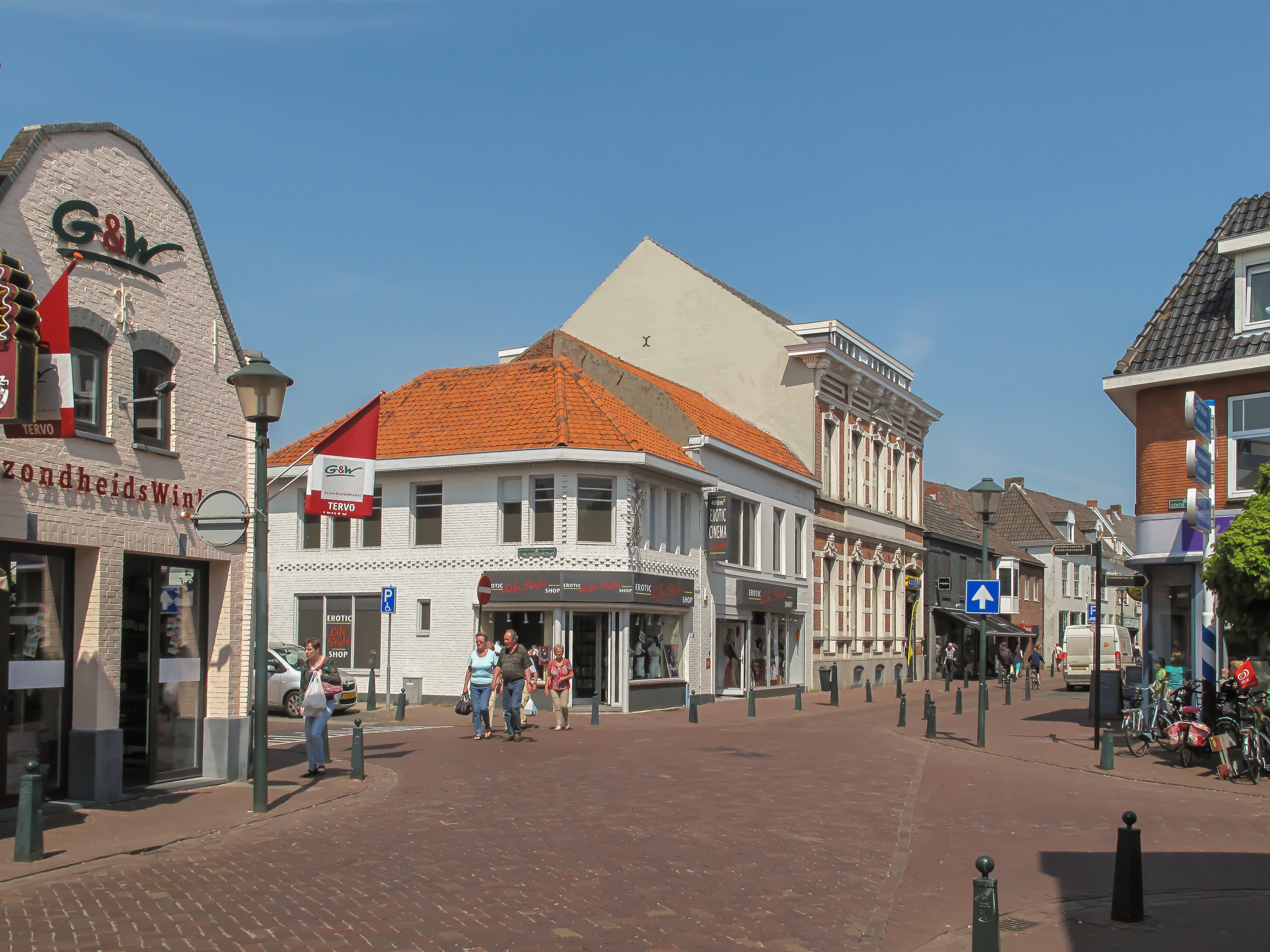
View to a street: de Gentsestraat

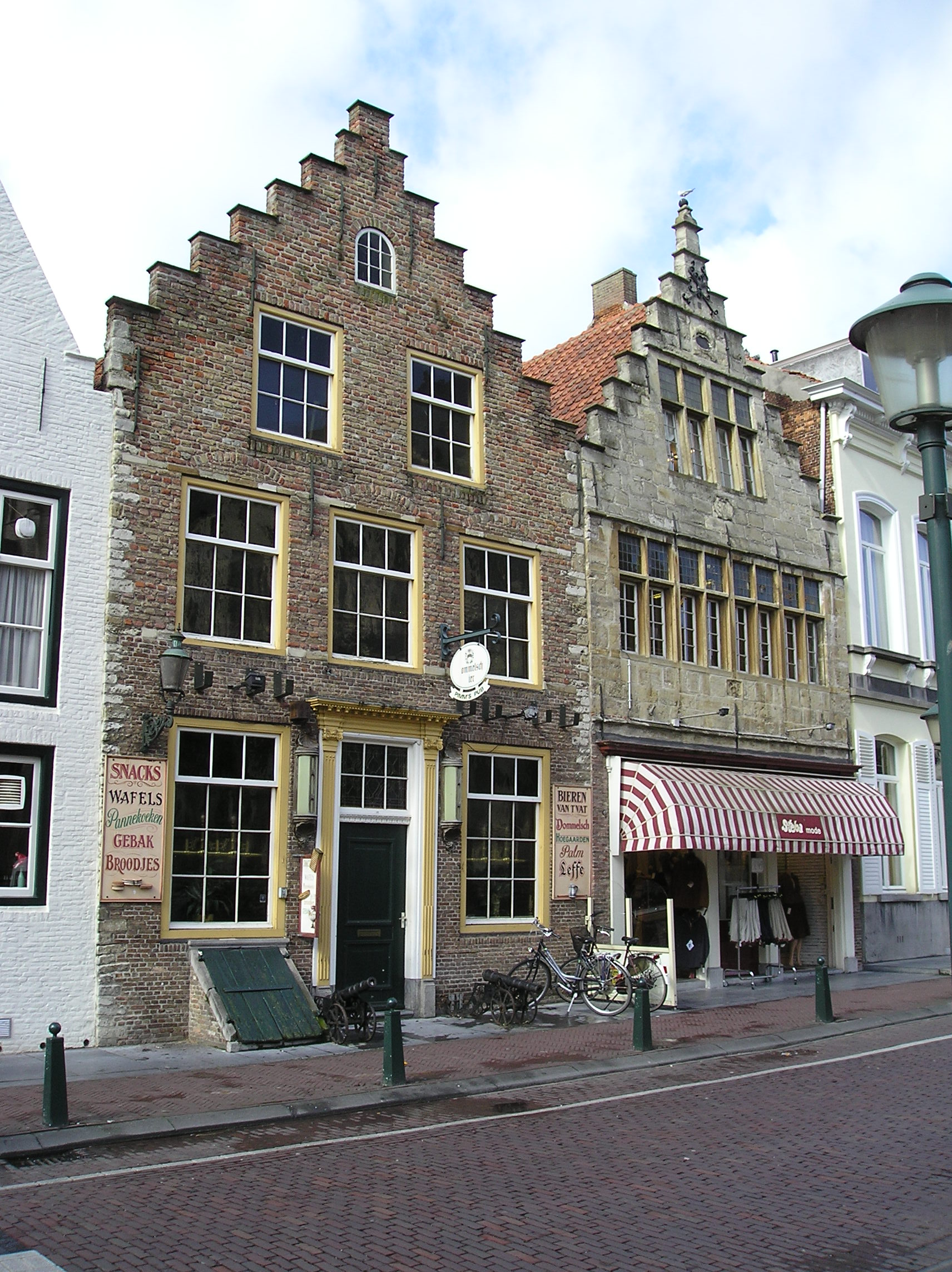
Historical houses

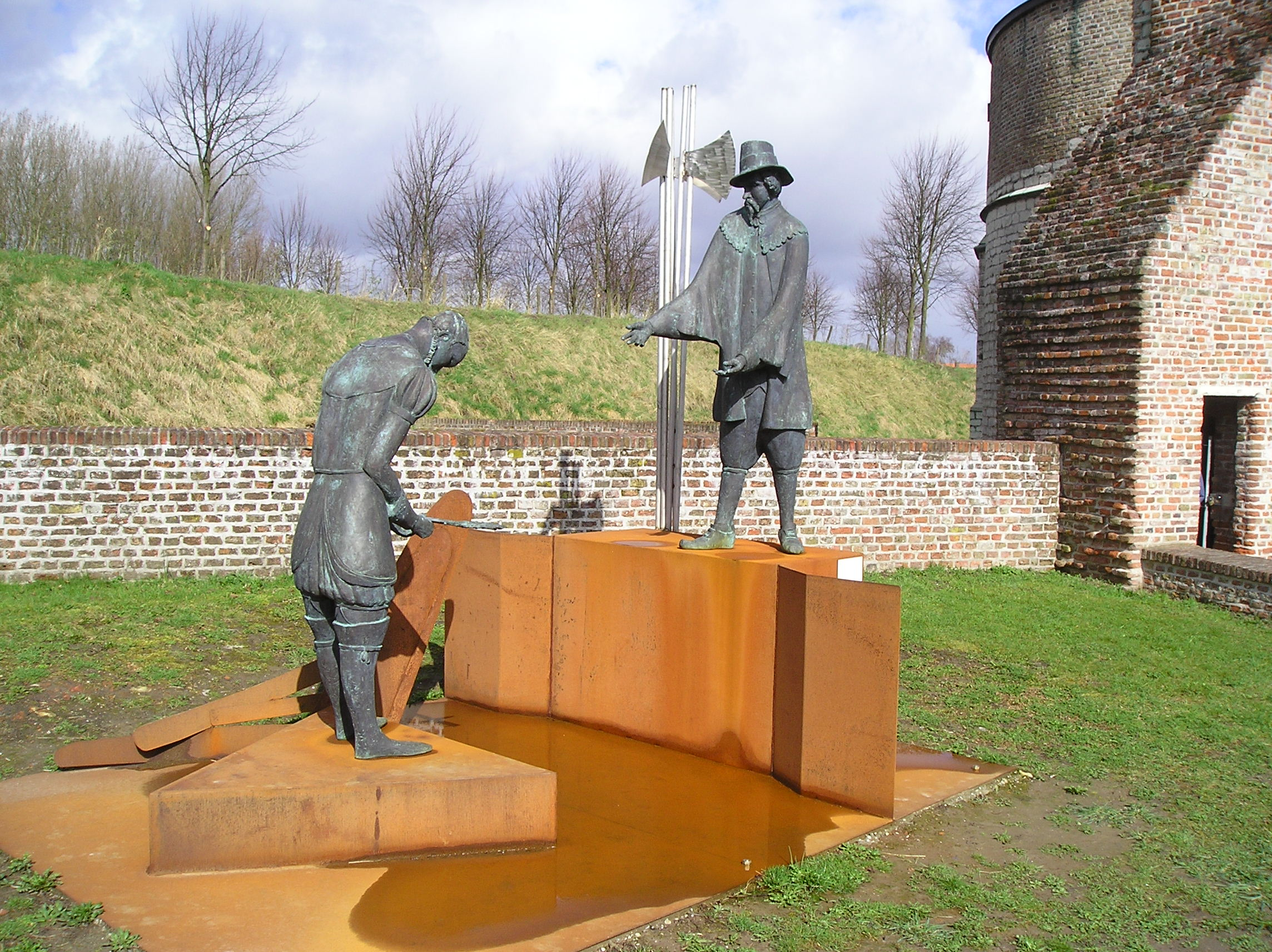
Monument on the defensive rampart of Hulst

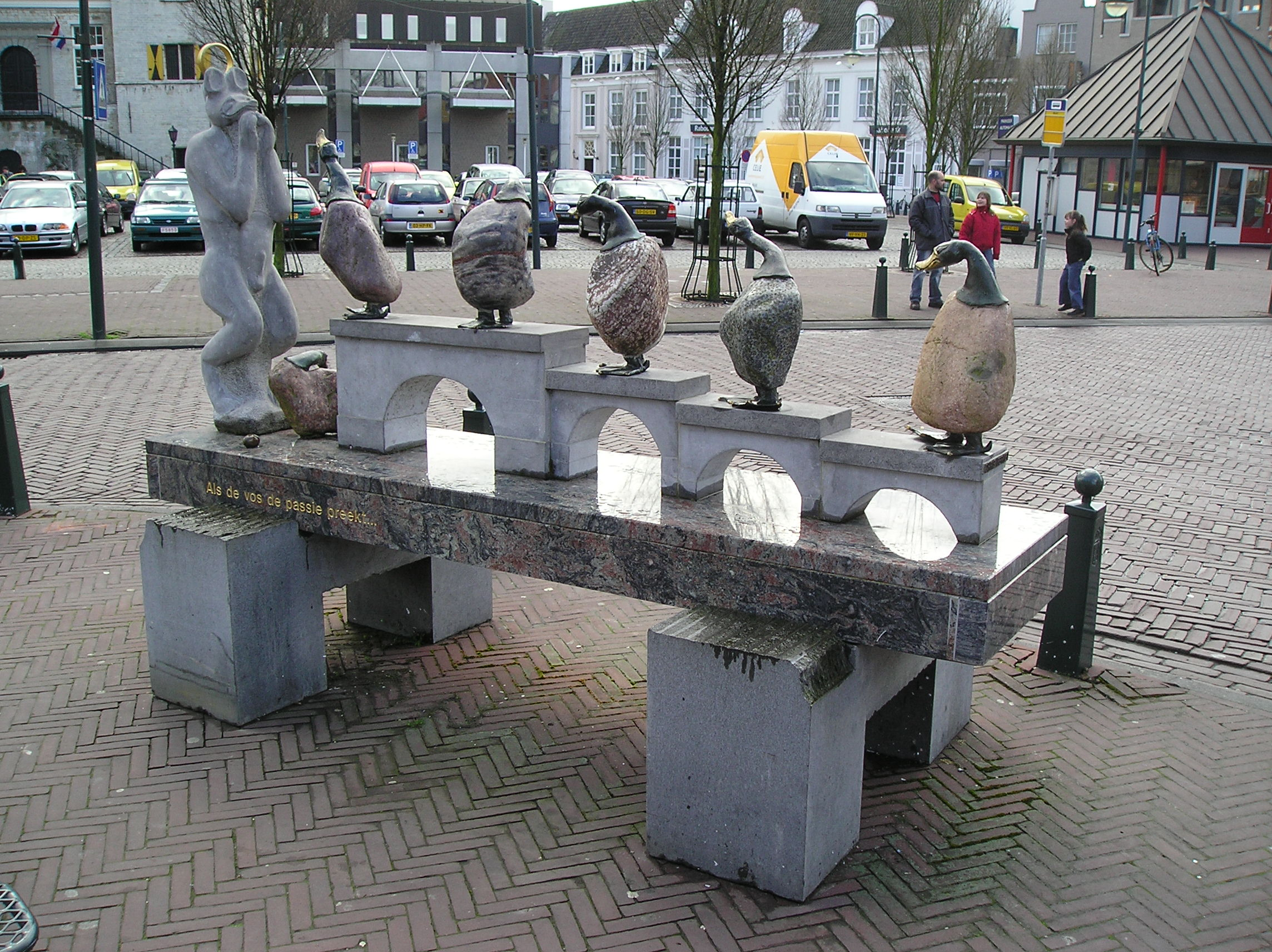
Artwork by Kris Ferket

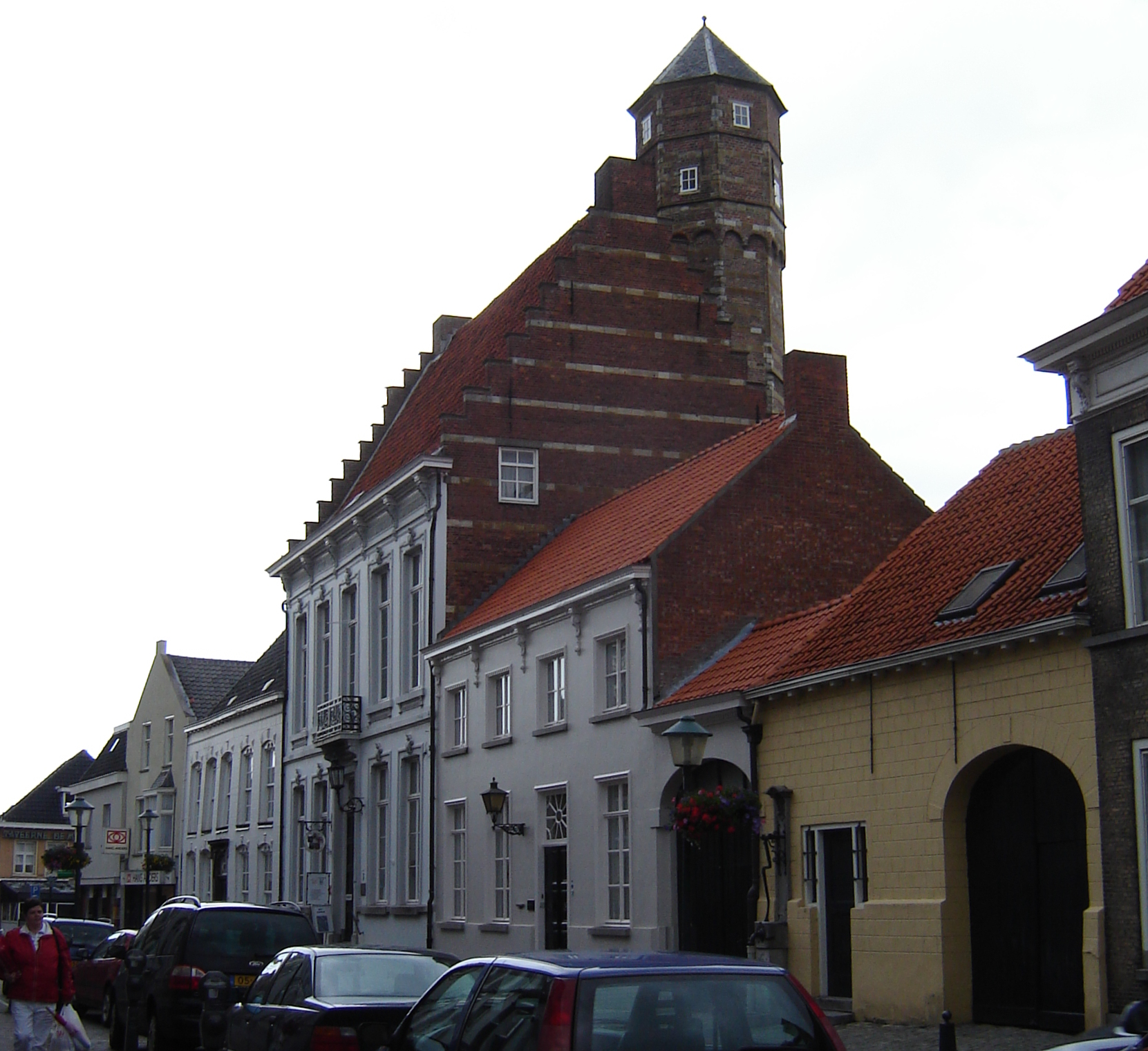
The museum De Vier Ambachten, former refugium of the Abbey Our Lady Ten Duinen

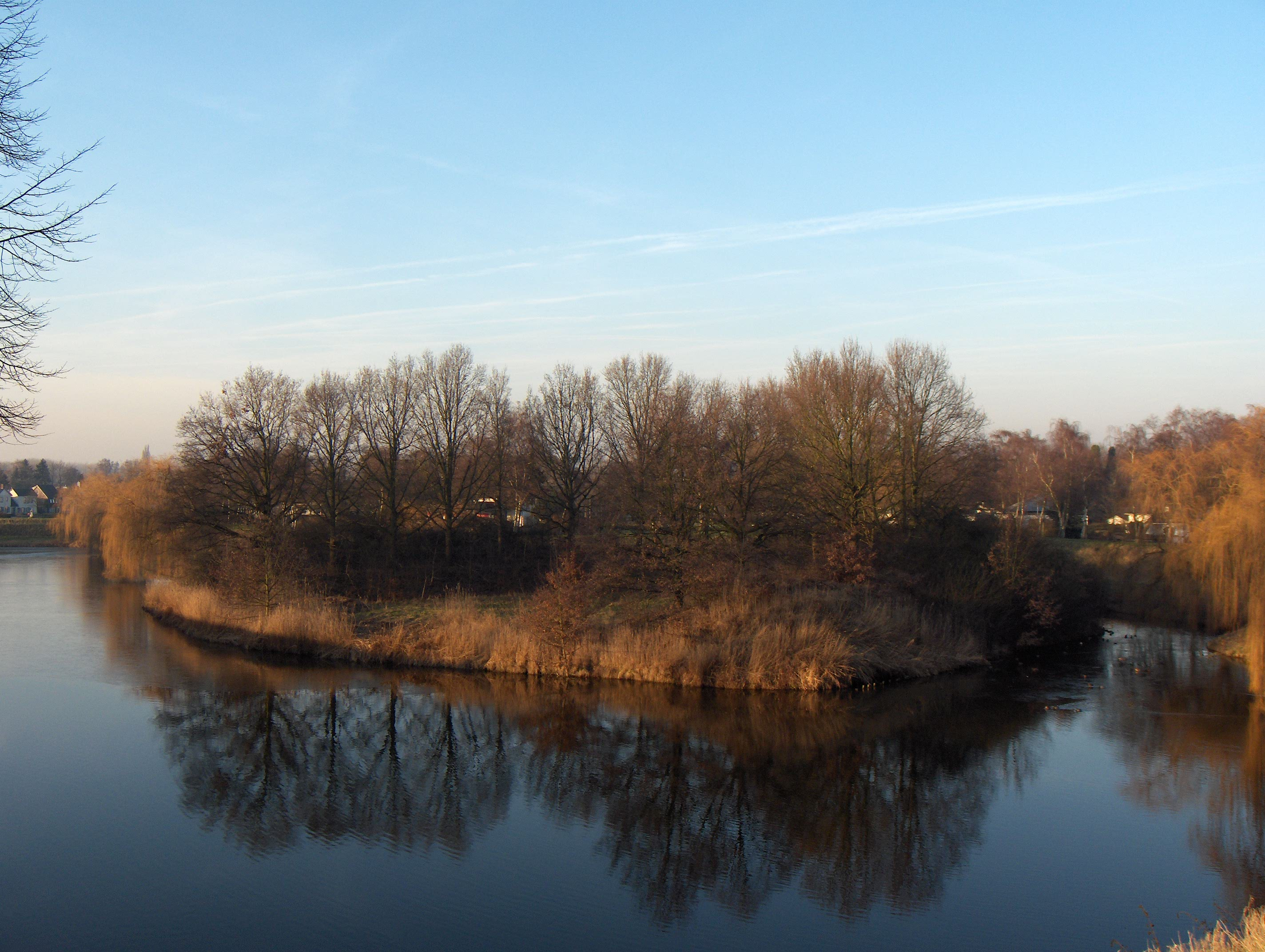
Hulst Ravelijn
