= Hontenisse =

Former municipality in the Netherlands

Coordinates: 51°21′05″N 4°02′29″E

Hontenisse (population in 2002: 8,014) is a former municipality in the southwestern Netherlands, in the municipality of Hulst in the province of Zeeland. The municipality covered an area of 115.78 km² (of which 3.53 km² water).

On January 1, 2003 Hontenisse was merged into Hulst.
