= IJzendijke–Drieschouwen Line =

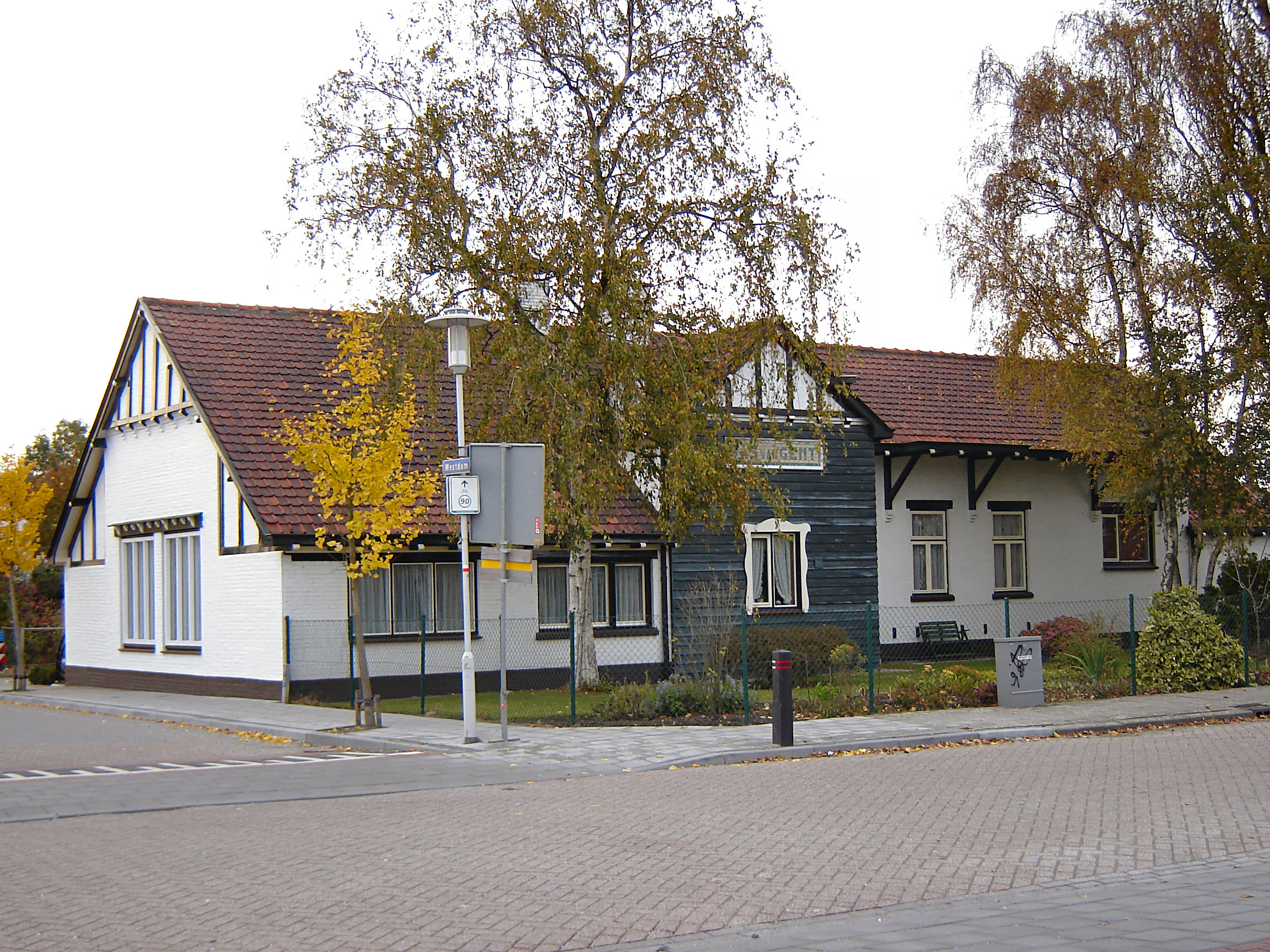
- Former tram station in Sas van Gent

Overview
- Status: Broken up
- Locale: Zeelandic Flanders, Netherlands

Service
- Type: Narrow-gauge railway
- System: tram
- Operator: Zeeuwsch-Vlaamsche Tramweg Maatschappij

History
- Opened: 1914/5
- Closed: 1948

Technical
- Line length: 30.140 km
- Character: .
- Track gauge: 1,000 mm (3 ft 3 3/8 in) metre gauge
Route map
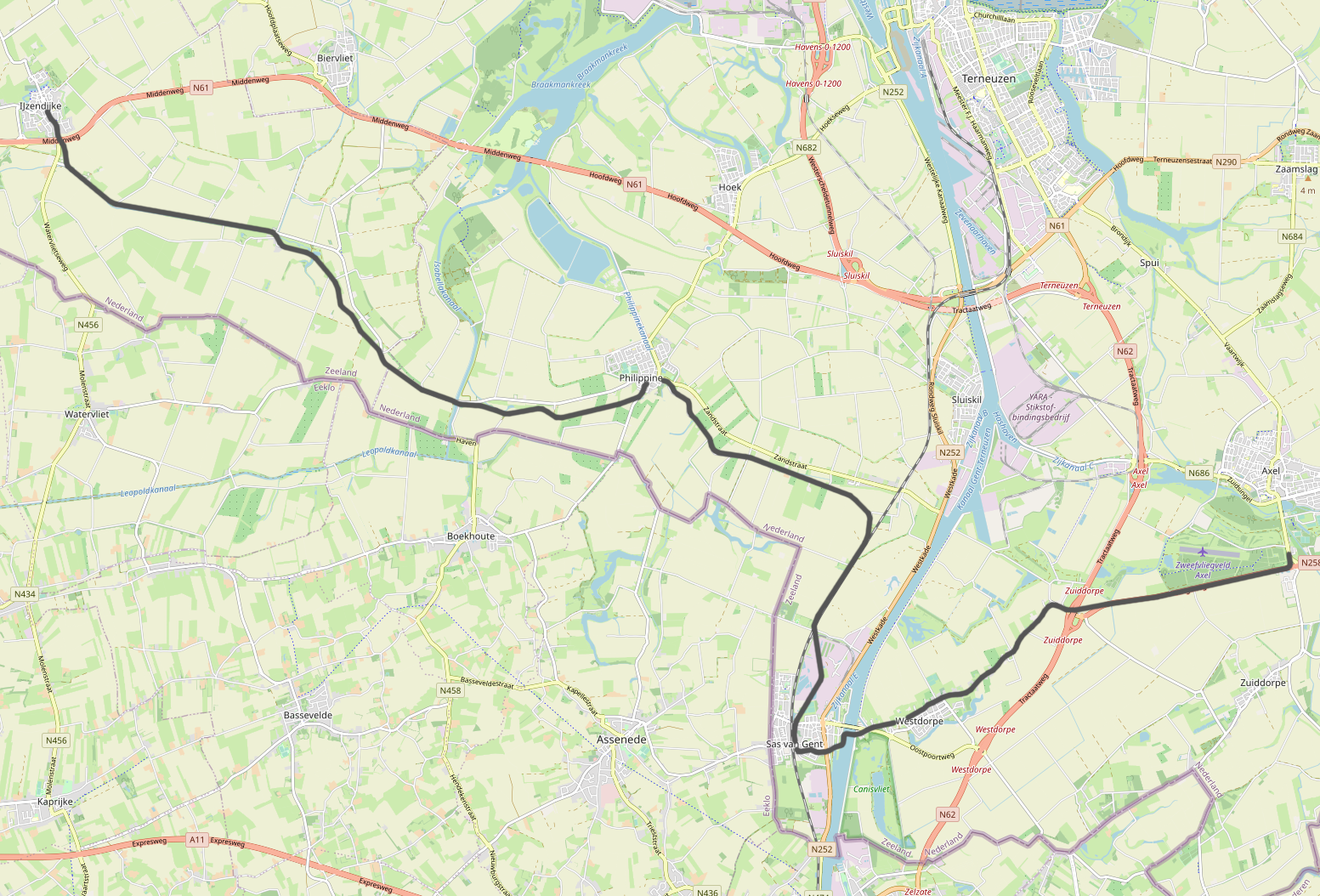

The IJzendijke–Drieschouwen Line, was a narrow-gauge railway or tramway in Zeelandic Flanders, the Netherlands. It was opened in 1914 and closed down in 1949.

The line was primarily built to transport persons and sugar beet. During World War I, it became the only significant overland connection between the western and eastern parts of Zeelandic Flanders.

== Construction ==
By 1911, there were three local tramways in Zeelandic Flanders. Each of them wanted to expand. There was also the initiative called plan Fruijtier. This wanted to build a tramway from Kloosterzande to Zelzate in Belgium, bypassing Sas van Gent. The plans all depended on subsidies. The Dutch government and Zeeland province then induced the IJzendijksche Stoomtramweg Maatschappij (IJzSM) to merge with the plan Fruijtier, which had already got a concession. The merged company became the Zeeuwsch-Vlaamsche Tramweg Maatschappij (ZVTM), founded in 1911.

As ZVTM inherited IJzSM's Schoondijke–Veldzicht line it was logical for ZVTM to build from there. ZVTM then designed a line from IJzendijke (an IJzSM station) to Drieschouwen. The part from IJzendijke to Sas van Gent was 20,650 m long and was ready in 1914. The part from Sas van Gent to Drieschouwen was 9,490 m long and was finished in 1915. Drieschouwen was planned to become the center of ZVTM's operations. It got a central train depot, central workshop and a central office.

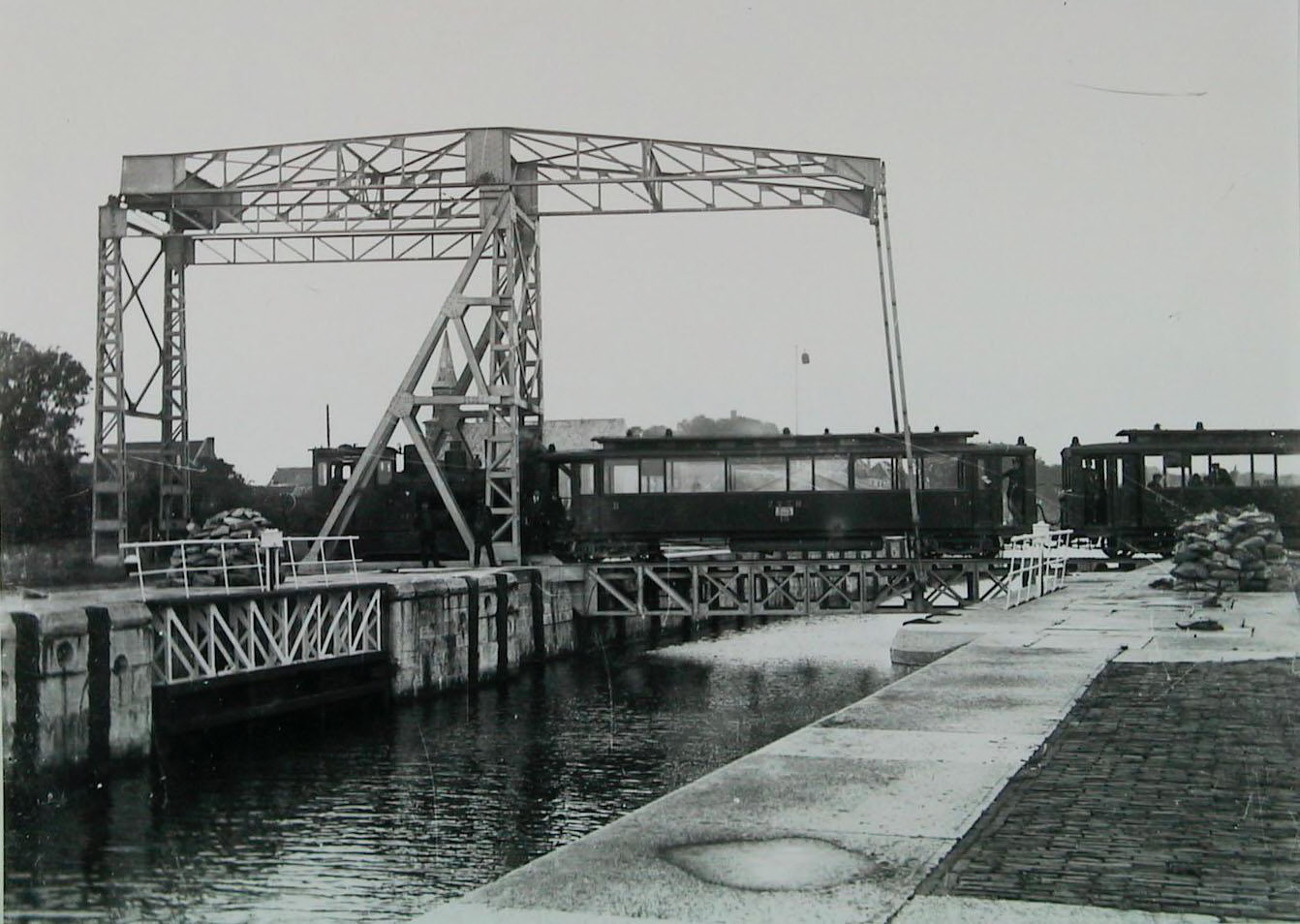
Bridge over the middle branch in Sas van Gent

Constructing the part of the line through Sas van Gent was challenging. Unlike the railroad, the tram passed straight through the town, where it had to cross the three branches of the Ghent–Terneuzen Canal. The swing bridge that crossed the newest and widest branch had been designed to be suitable for tramways and therefore did not pose a problem. The two other bridges were not reachable for the tram. An obvious solution would have been to build a new swing bridge or rolling lift bridge, but this was impossible in the local circumstances. Therefore, two drawbridges were built.

Just south of the city center, a new draw bridge was built to cross the oldest branch of the canal. East of that, another bridge was built to diagonally cross the lock in the second branch. From there, the tram had to follow an 'S'-like trajectory, first steaming as far east as possible, and then making a turn west, and then eastwards, in order to be able to line up to cross the newest bridge. When ZVTM's tram lines were broken up, these two draw bridges were also demolished.

Another notable aspect of the line were the telephone lines. There was private, direct phoneline between IJzendijke and Drieschouwen.

The IJzendijke–Drieschouwen Line would become the core of ZVTM's network. In IJzendijke it connected to the Schoondijke–Veldzicht Line. In Drieschouwen it would connect to the Drieschouwen–Kloosterzande Line and the Drieschouwen–Moerbeke Line. In between more connections were planned. At Pyramide, it would connect to Hoofdplaat, at Philippine it would connect to Terneuzen, and at Sas van Gent it would connect to Zelzate.

The line was directly connected to the Sugar Factory Sas van Gent, Eerste Nederlandsche Coöperatieve Beetwortelsuikerfabriek, and the chemical plant in Sas van Gent. The lines to Zelzate and Moerbeke connected to the sugar factory in Selzate, and Moerbeke Sugar Factory.

== Use ==
The IJzendijke–Drieschouwen Line first came into use to transport sugar beet. On 1 October 1914, the part between IJzendijke and Sas van Gent was opened for the transport of sugar beet and other freight.

During World War I, the geography of Zeelandic Flanders was very different from how it is today. The large tidal inlet Braakman near Philippine, came to within 100 m of the border with Belgium, practically cutting Zeelandic Flanders in two halves. In good weather, pedestrians could use the 1.5 m wide top of the dike to go from west to east or v.v. Carriages, horses, and cattle had to use the Vrije Dijk. This was a dike on Belgian territory, and was not even paved. Its use was guaranteed by the treaties that regulated the borders after Belgium's independence. However, in 1914, the German occupiers closed it to all traffic.

On 5 January 1915, ZVTM then opened the part between IJzendijke and Sas van Gent for passenger traffic. For this it used hired rolling stock. On 1 October 1915, the rest of the line, towards Drieschouwen, was opened for passenger and freight traffic. On 1 September 1915, the freight lines Sas van Gent–Zelzate and Drieschouwen–Moerbeke became operational.

On 1 August 1948 passenger traffic between Pyramide and Drieschouwen ended. On 16 March 1949, the last passenger line in Zeelandic Flanders, that from Breskens to Pyramide was cancelled. In September 1949, freight traffic ended. The tracks were then broken up.

== The line today ==
In Sas van Gent, ZVTM's tramstation is still standing, but has been repurposed. In Pyramide, the station is also still standing.

In Drieschouwen the central train depot is still standing, but is now hardly recognizalble. Also in Drieschouwen, some staff houses are still standing.
