= Drieschouwen–Moerbeke Line =

Overview
- Status: Broken up
- Locale: Zeelandic Flanders, Netherlands
- Termini: Drieschouwen; Moerbeke

Service
- Type: Narrow-gauge railway
- System: tram
- Operator: Zeeuwsch-Vlaamsche Tramweg Maatschappij

History
- Opened: 1915
- Closed: 1949

Technical
- Line length: 10.450 km
- Character: .
- Track gauge: 1,000 mm (3 ft 3 3/8 in) metre gauge
Route map
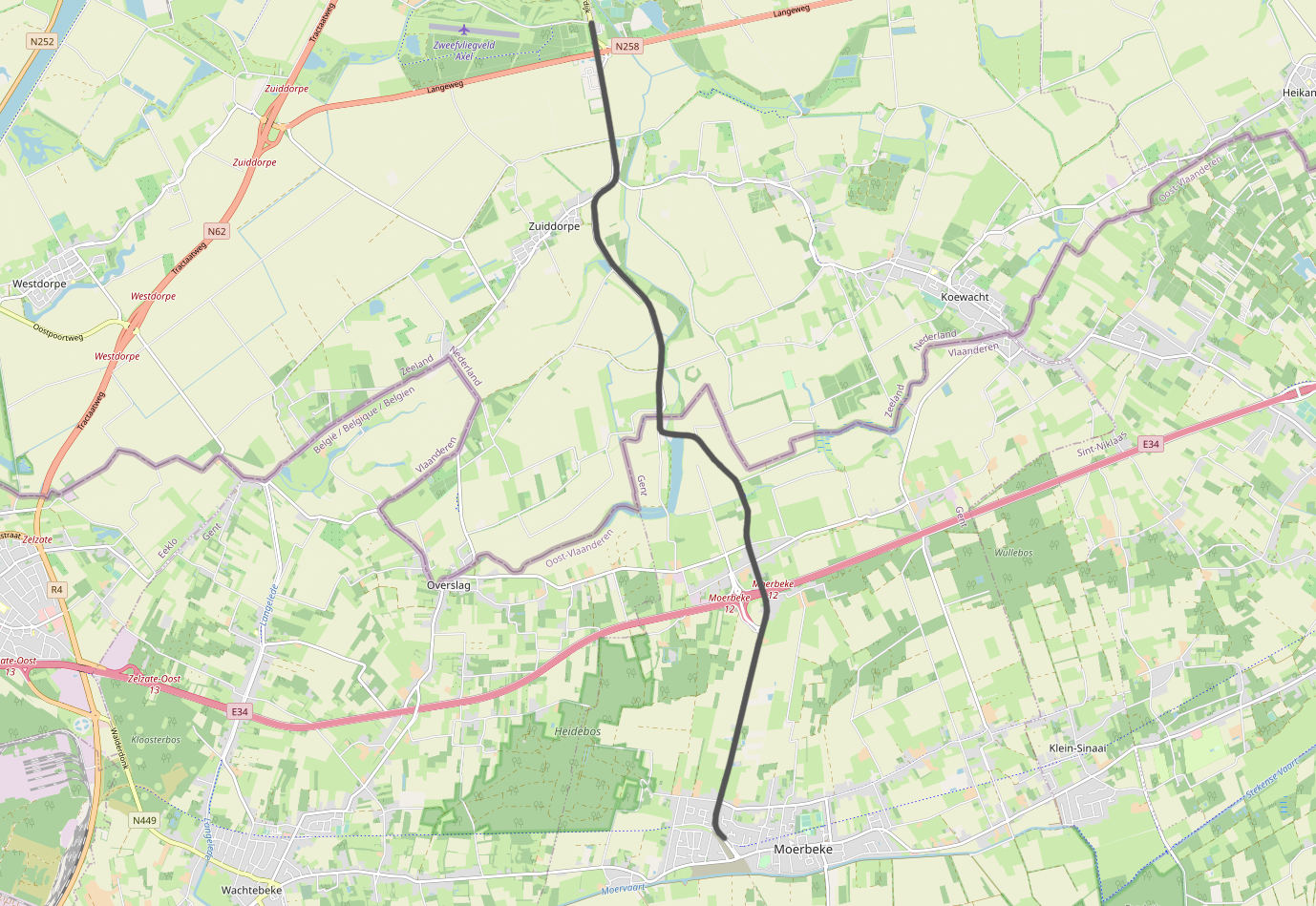

The Drieschouwen–Moerbeke Line was a narrow-gauge railway or tramway in Zeelandic Flanders, the Netherlands. It was opened in 1915 and closed down in 1949.

The line was built to transport sugar beet. From 1926 to 1934, the line was also used to transport passengers.

== Construction ==
In the eastern part of Zeelandic Flanders Stoomtram Hulst–Walsoorden (SHW) began to operate in 1902. This was a connection between the regional center Hulst and the provincial ferry at Walsoorden. However, it was also important for transporting sugar beet. Several competing plans then came up to extend this line to the west. The so-called plan Fruijtier wanted to build a line from Kloosterzande to Zelzate in Belgium, bypassing Sas van Gent. The Dutch government wanted a connection to Sas van Gent and the western part of Zeelandic Flanders over Dutch territory.

The Zeeuwsch-Vlaamsche Tramweg Maatschappij (ZVTM), resulted from the merger of the company that wanted to execute the Plan Fruijtier and the IJzendijksche Stoomtramweg Maatschappij (IJzSM). The major change in the Plan Fruijtier was that the Kloosterzande line would go to Sas van Gent, which was good for Sugar Factory Sas van Gent and the Eerste Nederlandsche Coöperatieve Beetwortelsuikerfabriek. The ZVTM was headed by the Lippens family, that owned a big part of Moerbeke Sugar Factory. The interests of that factory would be served by the Drieschouwen–Moerbeke Line.

== Construction ==
On 1 October 1915, ZVTM opened the second part of its IJzendijke–Drieschouwen Line. From Drieschouwen, it could then easily supply the construction materials to build the 4,750 m long line up to Roodesluis, on the border with Belgium. Due to the war, it was impossible for ZVTM to build the 5,700 m long part up to Moerbeke. In early 1915, the management of Moerbeke Sugar Factory then took things in hand and built this section.

The line started at Drieschouwen, the first stop was at Zuiddorpe next was Roodesluis. Here, a border station with two toilet houses was built. On the Belgian part, the first stop was at Kruisstraat, next came Het Rijssel, and finally, Moerbeke station.

== Use ==
Notwithstanding the delays, the line was first used to transport sugar beet to Moerbeke Sugar Factory on 1 September 1915. During World War I, freight cars with beet were manually pushed over the border at Roode Sluis. Meanwhile, a passenger tram ran twice a day between Drieschouwen and Zuiddorpe.

After World War I, the Belgian connection between Zelzate and Moerbeke suffered from a broken bridge across the Ghent–Terneuzen Canal. This induced ZVTM to open a passenger connection between Drieschouwen and Moerbeke on 16 January 1926.

On 1 June 1934, the passenger service was cancelled. Freight traffic on the line ended in December 1949. The line was then broken up.
