= Zeeuwsch-Vlaamsche Tramweg Maatschappij =

Public transport company in the Netherlands

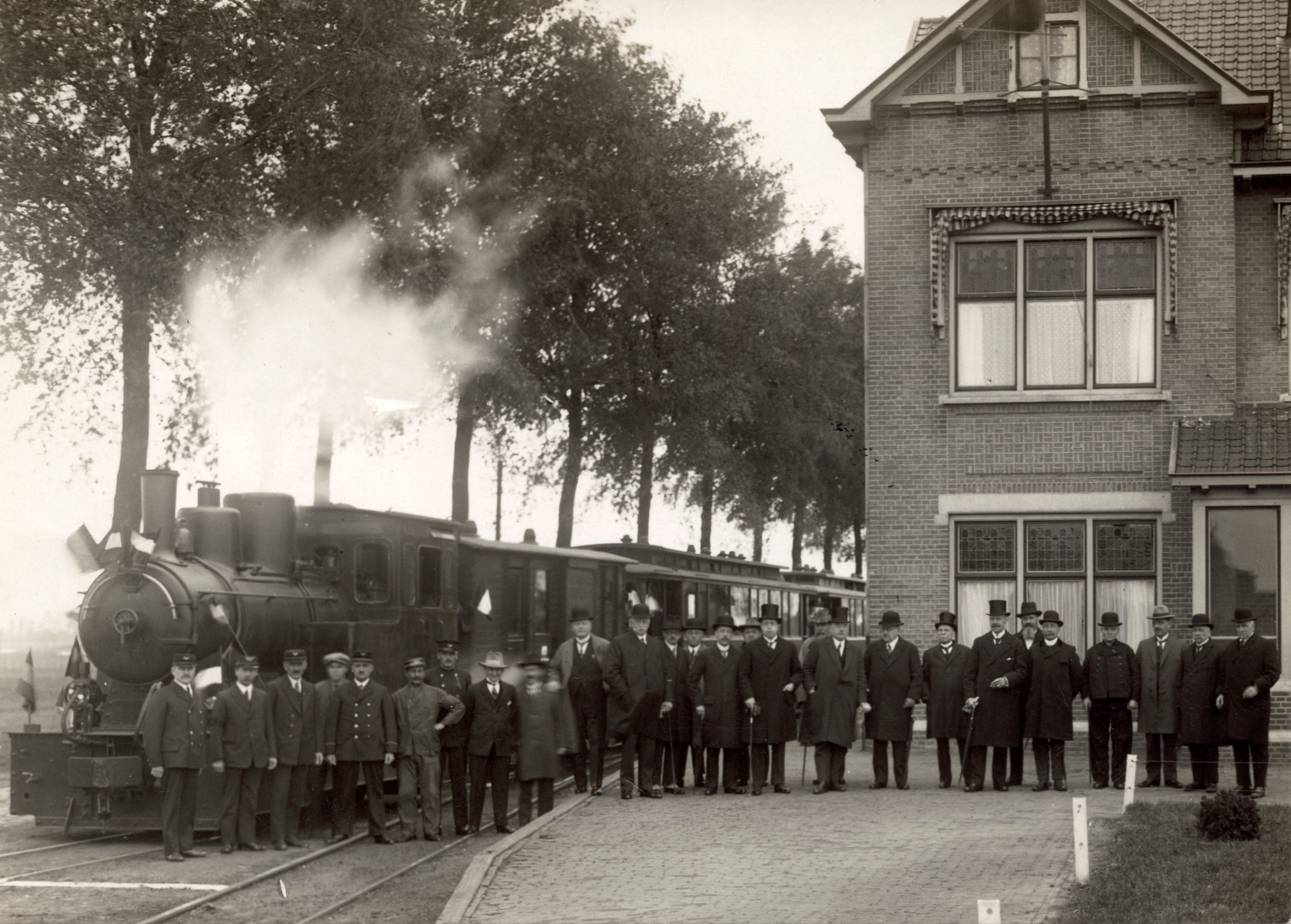
- Drieschouwen station and ZVTM steam tram with management, employees and others, 1926.

Overview
- Main region: Zeelandic Flanders
- Headquarters: Drieschouwen, Terneuzen

Technical
- Track gauge: 1,000 mm (3 ft 3 3/8 in) metre gauge

The Zeeuwsch-Vlaamsche Tramweg Maatschappij N.V. (ZVTM), in Terneuzen, was a public transport and freight company that operated in Zeelandic Flanders. It first operated a network of narrow-gauge railways. After World War II, it switched to busses.

The ZVTM was founded in 1911. It was the result of the combination of multiple plans. Passenger transport was about as important as agricultural transport. The latter was dominated by the transport of sugar beet to nearby sugar factories. These played a big role in founding and managing the ZVTM.

After World War II, ZVTM was not able to restore its raiway operation. Freigh traffic switched to lorries and passenger traffic switched to busses. The company lost its independence in 1971. In 1978, ZVTM was merged into streekvervoermaatschappij Zuid-West-Nederland

== Tram company ==
=== Context ===
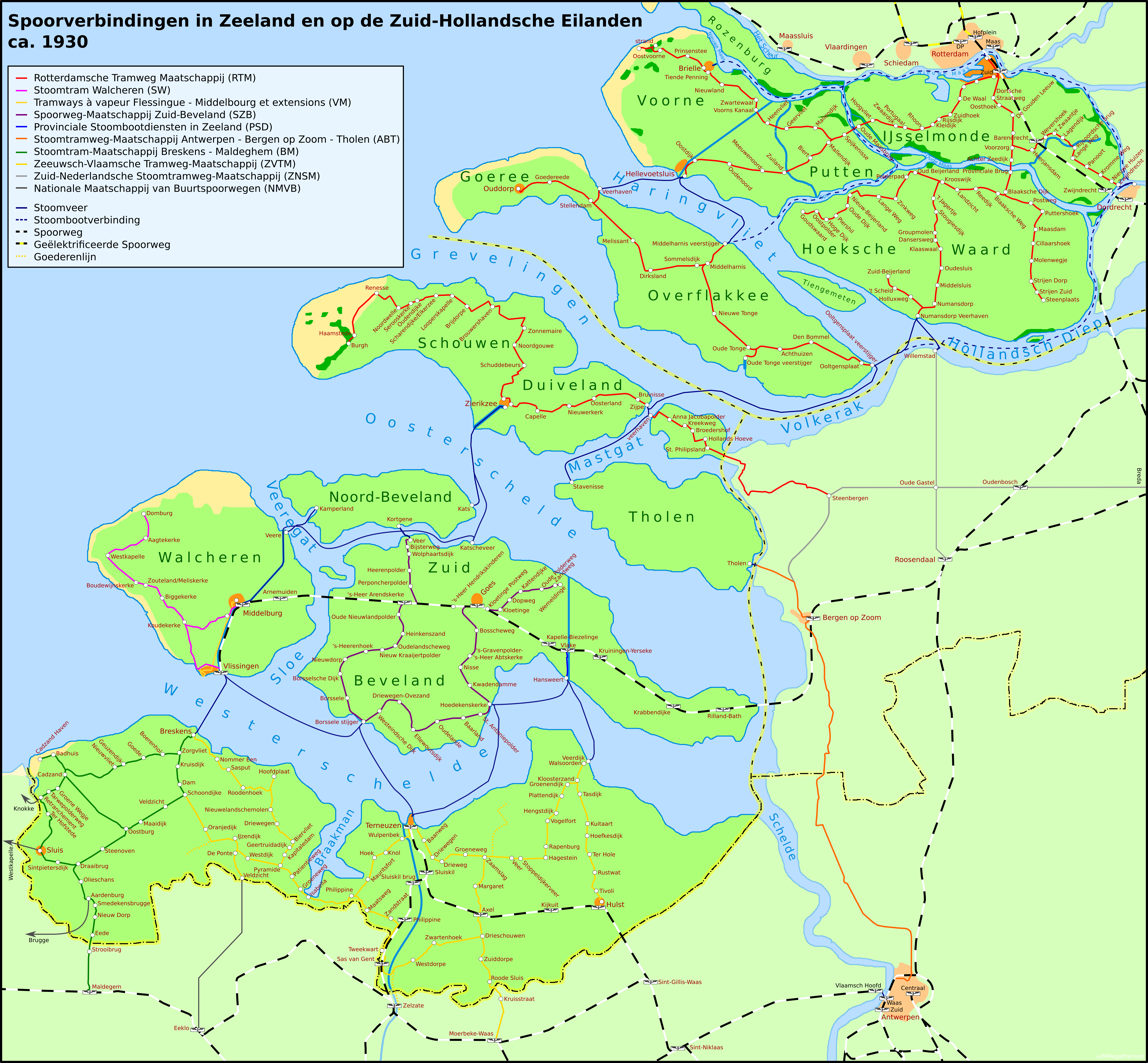
Tramways in Zeeland and on the islands of Zuid-Holland c. 1930.

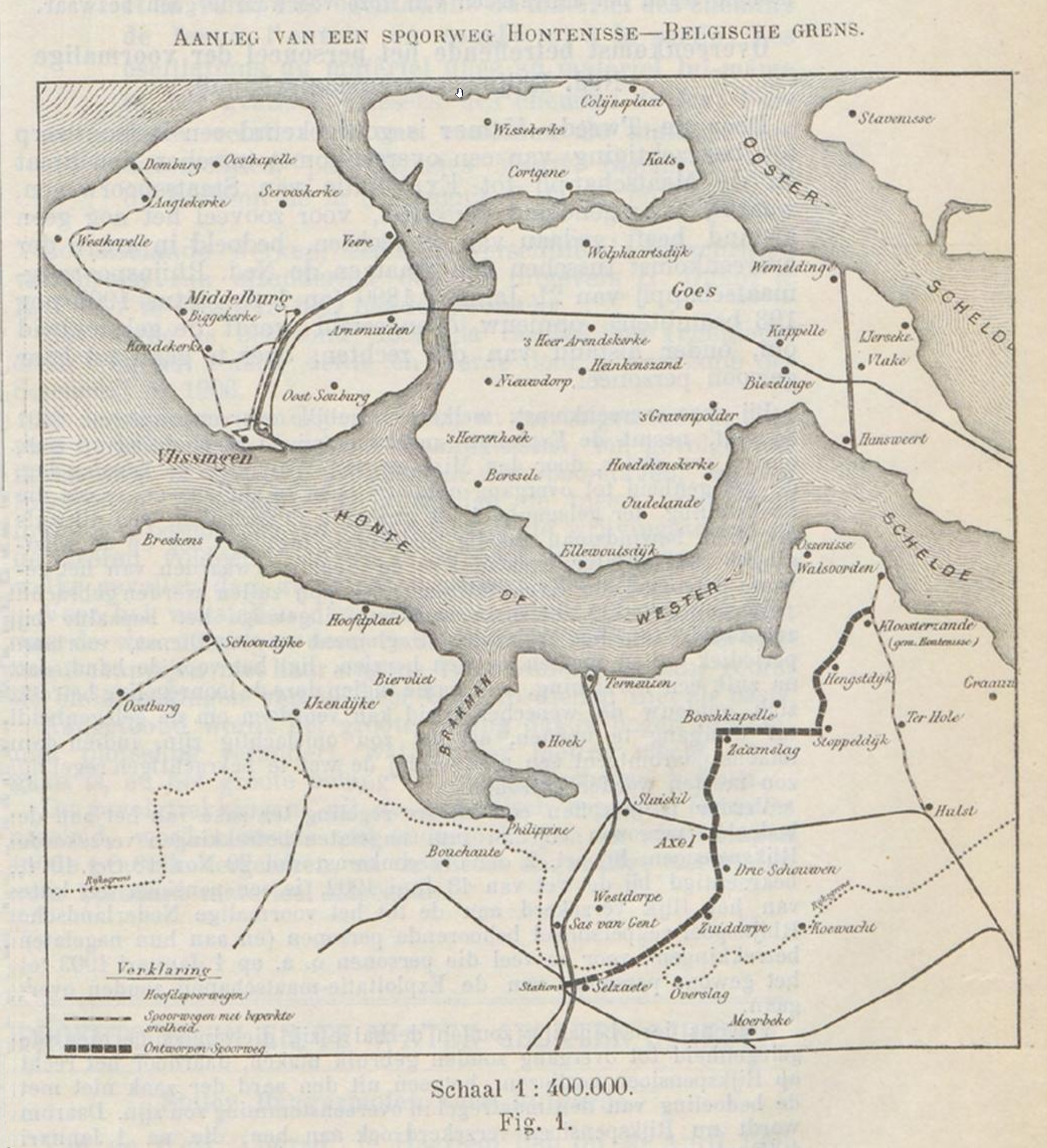
1908 plan for Hontenisse to Zelzate line

The first steam tram company in Zeeuwsch Vlaanderen was the Stoomtram Maatschappij Breskens–Maldeghem (BM) which started a line from Breskens to Maldegem in 1887. Just east of that, the IJzendijksche Stoomtramweg Maatschappij (IJzSM), began to operate the short line from Schoondijke to the border at Veldzicht in 1891. Stoomtram Hulst–Walsoorden (SHW) began to operate in 1902. Its line went from the Belgian railway station at Hulst to the provincial ferry at Walsoorden.

All three existing companies wanted to extend their lines. Meanwhile, a committee had been formed in the east of Zeeuwsch Vlaanderen. This wanted to build a railway from Hontenisse (Kloosterzande) to Zelzate in Belgium. This was the so-called Plan Fruijtier, which was given a concession to build that line. All plans more or less counted on government subidies. In 1908, the national government offered to advance money for the line to Zelzate, but only if that would also connect to Sas van Gent.

In 1909, two plans were discussed by the provincial government. The SBM plan for a line to Terneuzen was not supported. The IJzSM plans for a line from IJzendijke via Sas van Gent to Drieschouwen and then to the border near Moerbeke and for two other lines did get support. The national government then required that for customers, the line from Hontenisse to Zelzate and the connection from Zelzate to Sas van Gent would function as if both were operated by a single company. This induced IJzSM and the committee to merge and found the company Zeeuwsch-Vlaamsche Tramweg Maatschappij N.V. (ZVTM).

=== Foundation of the ZVTM ===
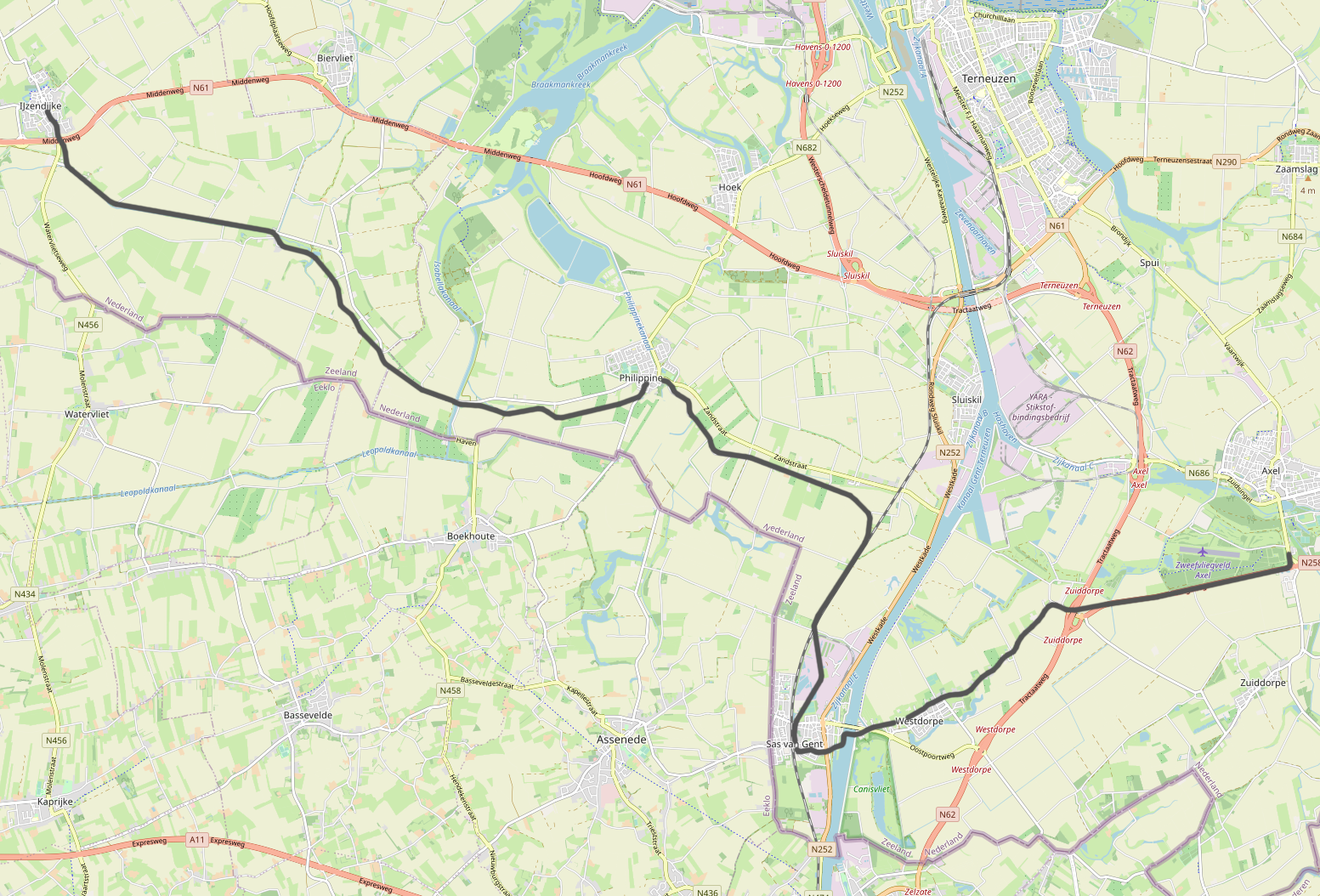
IJzendijke - Drieschouwen, core line of the ZVTM.

On 23 May 1911, the government approval for the foundation of the Zeeuwsch-Vlaamsche Tramweg Maatschappij came in. On 29 June 1911, the contract that established the ZVTM was registered in Terneuzen. Mr. Lippens, a lawyer from Ghent, became president of the company. Mr. P. Dieleman from Middelburg became secretary. The other members of the supervisory board were: Engineer Paul Lippens from Ghent; L. de Groot from Antwerpen; Mr, Ninave, director of the Franz Wittouck sugar factory in Zelzate; P.F. Fruijtier member of the Dutch parliament; Aug. Heijlen of the Vicinaux in Louvain; J.A. van Rompu shipping agent in Terneuzen; and mr. K.P. Vermandele of the Rotterdamsche Bank. The Lippens family owned a big part of Moerbeke Sugar Factory.

In its final form, ZVTM would get a share capital of 800,000 guilders, divided in 1600 shares of 500 guilders each. Fruytier, Dieleman, and Heylen would form the executive. The supervisory board remained almost identical. Of the share capital, shares worth 110,000 guilders were not taken initially.

It was easy to merge the concession Fruijtier into the new company. Merging IJzSM into ZVTM took more time. On 26 April 1911, an extraordinary meeting of IJzSM shareholders took place right after the regular annual shareholders meeting. A proposal to sell the assets of IJzSM and then to liquidate it failed, because there were not enough shareholders present. In October 1911, another extraordinary shareholder meeting was held. It discussed a proposal to abolish the company and to transfer everything to the ZVTM for 110,000 guilders in shares of that company. This proposal was approved.

=== Initial plan of the ZVTM ===
The new company made small changes to the combined plans. A significant difference was that the line from Hontenisse to Selzate would now end at Drieschouwen instead of at Selzate. In Drieschouwen it would connect to Sas van Gent and to Moerbeke. The combined plan of the company envisioned these lines:

- IJzendijke–Philippine–Sas van Gent
- Sas van Gent–Drieschouwen–Zuiddorpe to Moerbeke
- Pyramide–Hoofdplaat
- Philippine–Terneuzen–Zaamslag
- Hontenisse–Drieschouwen
- Sas van Gent–Selzate

Of these, the parts from IJzendijke to Moerbeke were initially considered to be the main line of ZVTM. In late 1913, the company started tenders to construct the whole of this line in two parts. Somewhat later, on 11 June 1914, ZVTM tendered and gave orders for: a border railway station near Moerbeke; a restored and expanded train depot at IJzendijke; a station at Pyramide; a station at Sas van Gent; and at Drieschouwen: a central office, central train depot, central work sheds, a warehouse and a fuel depot.

=== World War I ===
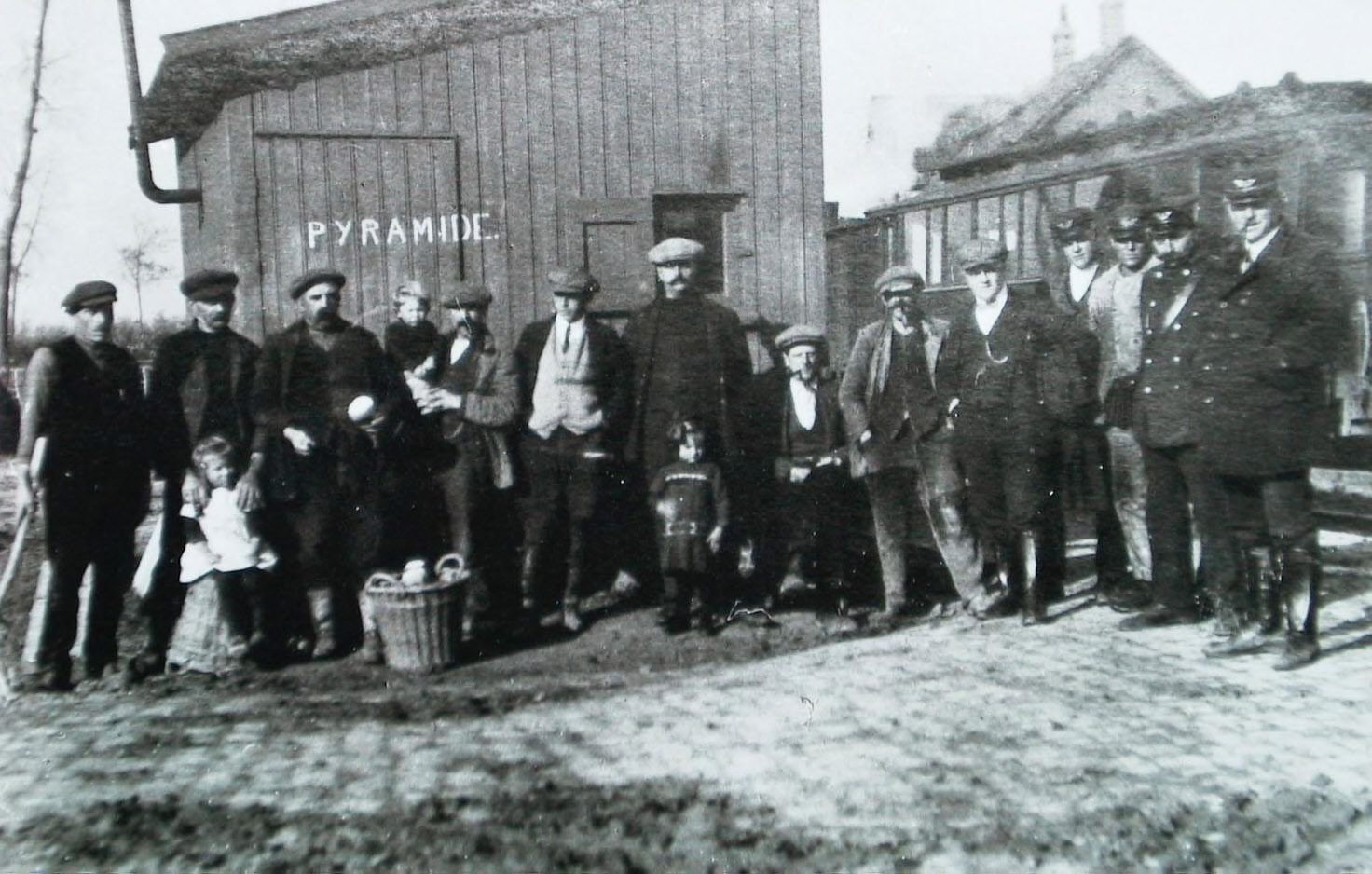
Shack at Pyramide, the station is behind the tram.

In World War I, Germany invaded Belgium on 4 August 1914. After the German army took Antwerp on 10 October, the border between Zeelandic Flanders and Belgium was closed.

ZVTM opened the line from IJzendijke to Sas van Gent on 1 October 1914. On its (combined) Schoondijke - IJzendijke line, ZVTM initially offered services to transport: closed freight car loads of at least 5,000 kg; ditto for open freight cars; and transporting general cargo to a limited number of stops.

It seemed that ZVTM was planning to systematically expand its rail network, but World War I posed different requirements. For example, the war cut the only overland connection for vehicles between the western and eastern parts of Zeelandic Flanders. This happened to use Belgian territory. Therefore, on 5 January 1915, ZVTM also began to offer passenger traffic on its existing line.

World War I also disrupted the communications between the Netherlands and its colonies. One of the products that used to be shipped en masse from Java, was raw sugar. Meanwhile, a considerable part of the sugar beet from Zeelandic Flanders was traditionally exported south, but in 1914/5, this was not allowed. The line from Sas van Gent to Selzate nevertheless became operational on 1 September 1915. That same month, the line to Moerbeke also became operational.

These circumstances might have induced the Dutch government to contract with ZVTM for a faster construction of the other planned lines. A detailed May 1915 contract called for a speedy construction of the remaining lines and held provisions for military transport. It allowed the state to take ownership of the company at any moment, provided that it paid an indemnity.

The close cooperation between ZVTM and the government indeed accelerated construction. By 1 July 1916, the lines: Sas van Gent–Selzate; Sas van Gent–Drieschouwen–Moerbeke; Drieschouwen–Zaamslag–Stoppeldijk–Kloosterzande; and Zaamslag–Terneuzen, were all ready to be taken into use.

After 1 July 1916, only Terneuzen–Philippine and Pyramide–Hoofdplaat to be constructed. However, the war now led to delays. Authorities therefore had to allow ZVTM to take more time than previously agreed. On 4 April 1918, the line from Pyramide to Hoofdplaat began to operate.

The line from Philippine to Terneuzen was also delayed because ZVTM had trouble to acquire the required grounds at a reasonable price. It therefore thought an expropriation law would be required. Even so, the line was approved for operation by the government in February 1918. In fact, it was ready, but not finished. Several switches had not been delivered, many loading tracks had not been completed, and many buildings were only wooden sheds. Even so, the Philippine–Terneuzen line started to operate on 1 March 1918.

In 1917 ZVTM acquired the shares of the Stoomtram Hulst–Walsoorden (SHW), which had operated since 1902.

=== 1920s ===
For public transport, ZVTM had to connect to the ports of Zeelandic Flanders. At the time, these were: Breskens, Hoofdplaat, Philippine, Terneuzen, and Sas van Gent. Of these, Breskens, Terneuzen, and Walsoorden had steam ferries across the Scheldt. At Sas van Gent, Axel and Moerbeke, ZVTM connected to the Belgian State Railways.

Carrying freight, especially sugar beet, was about as important as carrying passengers. ZVTM had direct connections to Sugar Factory Sas van Gent, Eerste Nederlandsche Coöperatieve Beetwortelsuikerfabriek, the sugar factory in Selzate, and Moerbeke Sugar Factory. It also connected to the chemical plant in Sas van Gent. Across the network, there were 43 big loading tracks. These were 80–180 m long and 15 m wide, excluding the track itself. These were paved and had a railroad scale. Three others were smaller. Six loading tracks were heightened for easy transport of cattle and machinery.

In business, ZVTM had a difficult start. In 1920, revenue increased from 506,209 to 672,645 guilders, i.e. by 33%, but the cost increased by 45%. Salaries alone increased by 66%. That year, earnings before interest and taxes were 89,673 guilders but the result was a net loss of 16,140 guilders. Transport of sugar beet increased from 80,306t in 1919 to 112,830t in 1920. Passenger traffic decreased. In 1923, ZVTM reorganized, leading to less employees and lower wages. In 1922/3 138,500t of beet were transported. In 1923/4 this was 148,500t. Passenger traffic decreased again due to competition from regular and irregular bus services. Net profit in 1923 was 51,912 guilders. In 1924/5 164,500t of beet were transported. In 1925/6, this was 152,500t. Passenger traffic increased slightly by giving strong reductions. In 1926 128,000t of beet were transported. In 1927, this was 122,000t. 1929 was very stable year, with a reasonable profit. Beet transport was 120,500t and passenger traffic remained stable. In 1930, 126,000t were transported. The gradual decrease in the amount of sugar beet that it transported was worrying for ZVTM, because lorries were taking an increasing chunk of this traffic.

The seat of the company was moved from Drieschouwen to the Scheldekade in Terneuzen on 12 October 1925.

=== 1930s ===
ZVTM revenue 1925–1936
1925	1926	1927	1928	1929	1930	1931	1932	1933	1934	1935	1936	1937	1938
620,411	509,806	499,242	508,282	549,691	524,386	294,378	337,802	320,658	297,307	273,472	267,096	261,197	243,673

In about 1930, most local tramways were in deep trouble. World War I and the years immediately following it, had caused a drastic increase in the cost of labor. The government had reacted by giving a emergency subsidy on fuel, but by 1929 this had become a permanent subsidy. Meanwhile, busses and lorries gave strong competition to the local tramways. The government then appointed the commission Van der Vegt. It had to investigate what was to be done.

One of the things that the commission noted, was that the bus companies were cherry-picking on the tramways. While the trams were legally bound to offer transport in a region, the bus companies preferred to ride on the more lines at busy hours. The central government had been too slow to bind bus companies to similar conditions. In general, the commission noted that trams were slower (35 km/h) than the new means of transport. Therefore new local lines for passenger transport were unlikely. This did not apply to freight traffic. In the end, te report did lead to a change in how local tramways were subsidized.

The overview of ZVTM's revenue shows how serious ZVTM's problems were. Much of its business disappeared, and would not come back. Over 1931, ZVTM suffered a loss and did not pay dividend. This was repeated in 1932. 1933 was the same, and so ZVTM took measures to reduce losses. In June 1934, it cancelled passenger service between Axel and Moerbeke. It also fired 9 employees. In 1934, ZVTM also changed its articles of association, henceforth these referred to public transport, instead of a number of railways.

In 1935, ZVTM began to operate a number of bus lines, which led to complaints from local bus operators. In fact ZVTM had already experimented with busses on the Hulst–Walsoorden line, but in 1935 these were replaced by Diesel motor coaches (see below). These were also allowed to go faster: 55 km/h instead of 35 km/h.

By 1935, ZVTM's situation had become catastrophic. Over 1931 to 1935, losses had been: 114,300, 57,800, 39,300, 50,700, and 29,610 guilders. ZVTM concluded that developments had made most of its assets worthless and made an extraordinary depreciation that increased the 1935 loss to a stupendous 3,951,268 guilders. This was related to a plan that would write off 85% of the shares (a 500 guilder share would become a 75 guilder share) bond holders would have to accept a lower interest: 2.5% instead of 5%. Finally, the government had to lower its claims (advances) against the company by 85%. On 18 January 1936, both the bondholders and the shareholders agreed to this plan. In February, ZVTM fired another 20 employees.

The advances were interest-free loans of 941,183 guilders by the province and 1,778,167 guilders by the Dutch state. Zeeland province first wanted to investigate the matter. The national government was in favor of the restructuring, but would let Zeeland decide. When the report appeared in June, it was not that favorable. It said that the salaries and number of top employees at ZVTM was way too high. It recommended: to put an end to the murderous competition in the area; to severely limit the salaries at the top; and to end the practice of some members of the provincial government being a member of the supervisory board as private persons.

The report created such a row that in the end, the provincial and state government only wanted to write off 85% of the advances if ZVTM merged with Tramweg Maatschappij Breskens–Maldeghem. The company then suggested that the shareholders and bond holders would do their part without the provincial and national government doing theirs. On 21 January 1937 both agreed to this proposal. On 17 February 1937, ZVTM then got the remission in the Eerste Kamer, without the condition that it should first merge with Breskens–Maldeghem.

Over 1936, ZVTM claimed a profit of 48 guilders. Total revenue was 199,313 from trams and 67,783 guilders from road transport. Over 1937, the profit was 21 guilders. 72,500t of beet were transported. ZVTM started 1938 by firing 11 employees. During the year, revenue continued to decrease. The bad harvest caused that only 60,000t of beet were transported. Profit was only 185 guilders. 1939 was a lot better, as revenue increased from 243,673 to 313,686 guilders, an increase of 28%.

In early 1939, ZVTM and BM finally agreed on a merger. When ZVTM agreed that BM's shareholders were entitled to 30,000 guilders that the Belgian government had recently, BM's supervisory board dropped its demand that their director should be in charge of the new company. However, one of the primary creditors of BM had a mortgage on its assets and refused to cooperate. In turn, this led the Zeeland government not to agree to the 85% reduction of the advances.

=== World War II ===
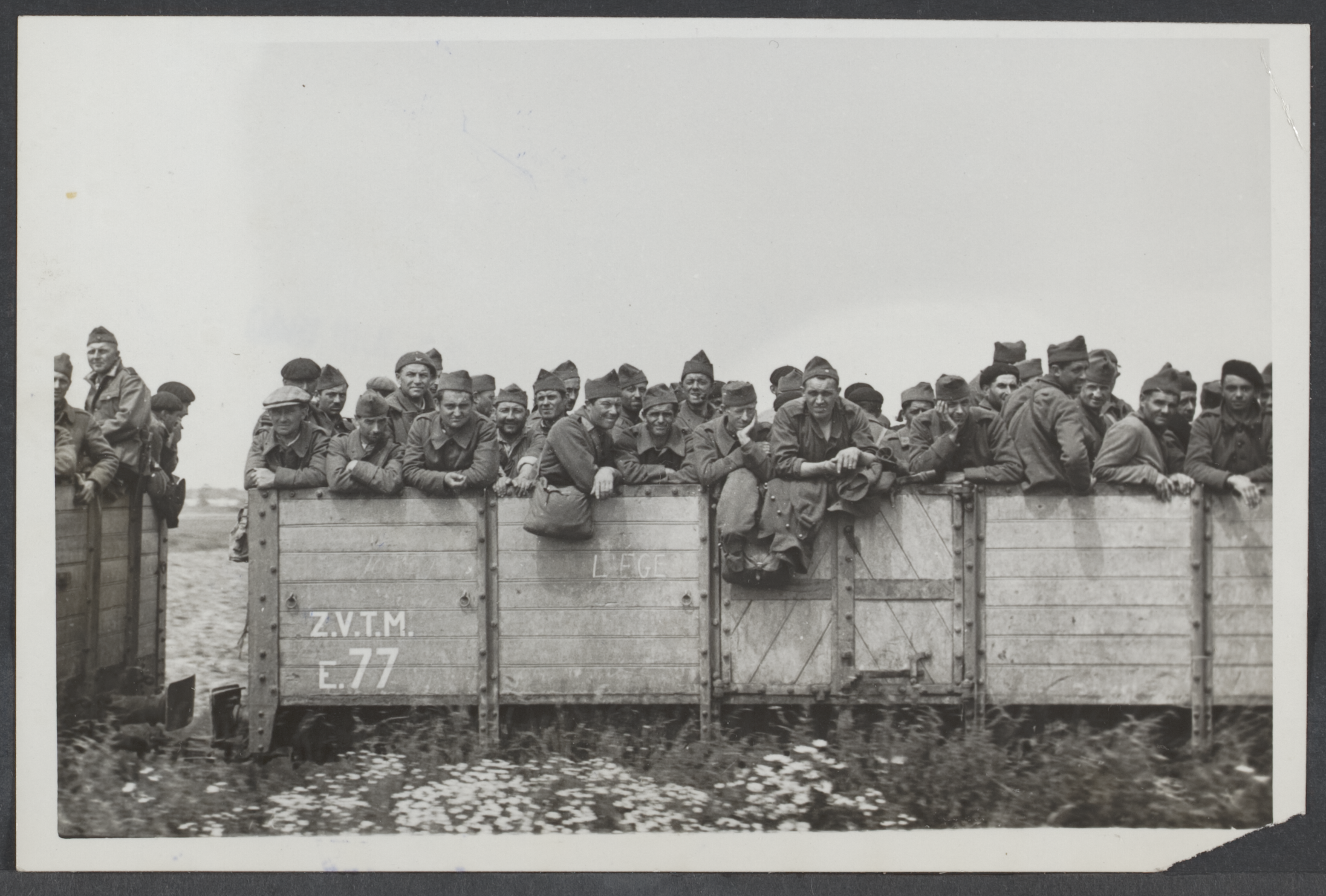
Transporting p.o.w.'s, 1940

ZVTM revenue 1939–1946
1939	1940	1941	1942	1943	1944	1945	1946	1947	1948
313,686	445,633	411,040	522,287	751,658	505,075	834,701	1,385,006	1,539,245	1,590,607

During the 1940 German invasion, ZVTM's infrastructure was damaged, but it soon restored operations. A notable job was the transport of many prisoners of war to Walsoorden after the Belgian capitulation of 28 May. On 16 May 1942 director C. Wind van Merkesteyn died. He had been director since 31 May 1920.

The overview of revenue shows that even while the recovery of the company had already started before the war, the company did profit from this war. The obvious reason would be that the shortage of gasoline eliminated competition by busses and lorries. In 1944, the company finally effected the 85% capital reduction. This allowed it to pay a 5% dividend over the reduced shares.

=== Last rail transports ===
On 21 September 1944, the allies liberated Philippine. This completed the liberation of the eastern part of Zeelandic Flanders. On 11 December 1944 ZVTM then restored tram service between Sas van Gent and Drieschouwen. In September 1947, ZVTM and BM pulled some wagons of an electric tram over their lines to promote electrification of their lines.

The Dutch government then ordered that as of 9 May 1948, the maximum speed on the lines of ZVTM would be 20 km/h. Only on the line from Breskens via Hoofdplaat to Pyramide, this would be somewhat higher at 30 km/h.

At the end of 1948, ZVTM had 18 locomotives, 15 passenger cars, 366 freight and other cars, 36 busses, 11 converted lorries, 16 lorries and 1 tractor. By then almost all passenger transport was done by bus. The company thought that freight traffic by tram could only continue if costly investments were made.

In early 1950, the company liquidated its rail operations.

== Bus company ==
In 1950, ZVTM became a bus only company. At the end of 1950, the company had 46 busses, 25 lorries and vans, and 1 trailer.

Bus line 19 came into existence after the North Sea flood of 1953, that destroyed public transport connections from Zeeuwsch Vlaanderen to the rest of the Netherlands over the Scheldt. This bus line went from Hulst to Breda (now Roosendaal) over Belgian territory.

In 1955 ZVTM had 46 busses. That year it tranported 1,800,000 passengers, 18 times more than in 1938. On the contrary, its freight transport branch had become insignificant compared to its pre-war cargo transport.

In 1971, the shares of ZVTM were acquired by the Nederlandse Spoorwegen. In 1975 the bus company Stoomtram-Maatschappij Breskens-Maldeghem (SBM) in Aardenburg was acquired. The whole became an NS daughter company that cooperated with the Rotterdamsche Tramweg Maatschappij (RTM) in Zierikzee. In 1978 this was merged into the streekvervoermaatschappij Zuid-West-Nederland, also in Zierikzee.

== Lines ==
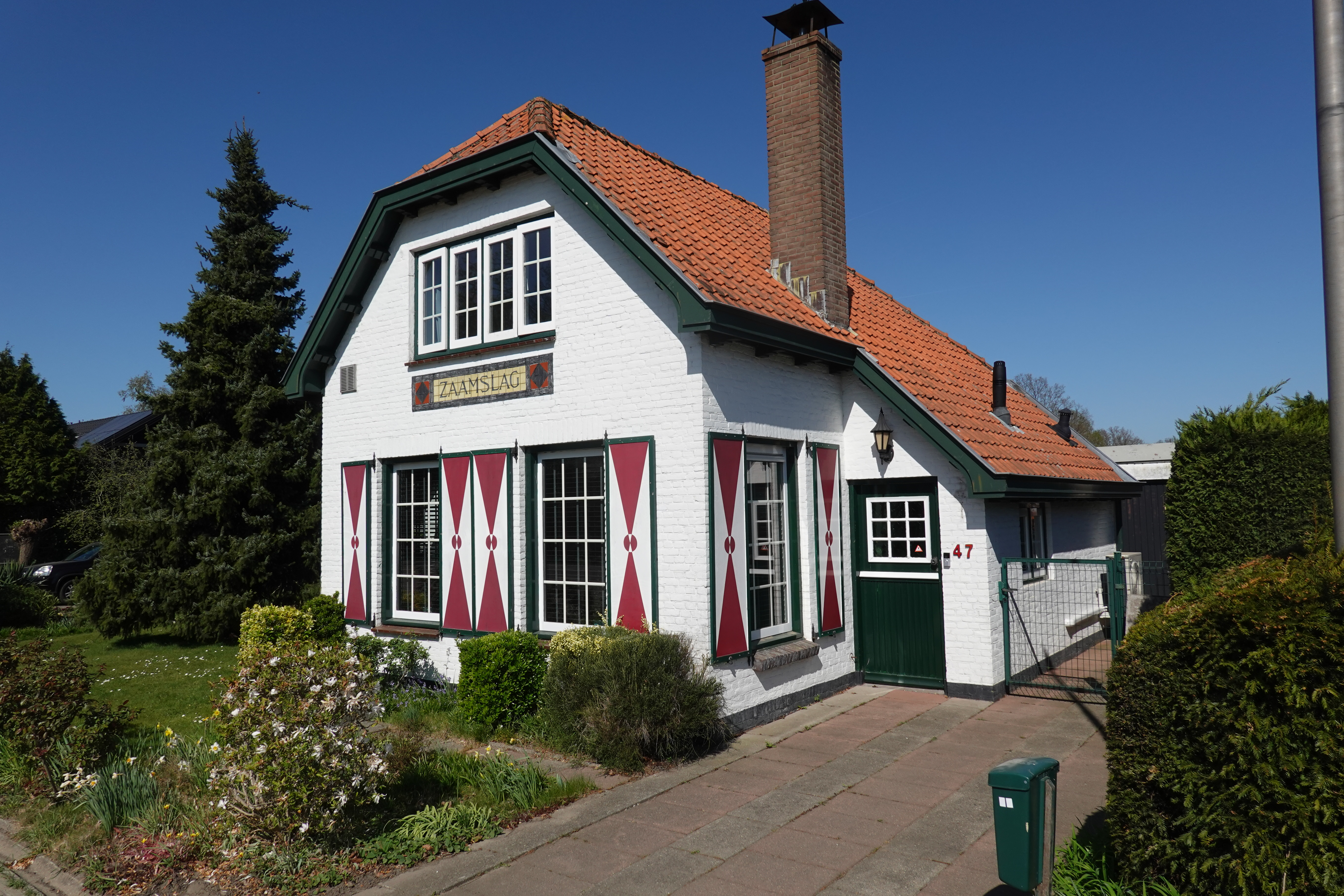
stop at Zaamslag

ZVTM acquired these Metre-gauge railways:

- Schoondijke–Veldzicht (built in 1891)
- Hulst–Walsoorden (built in 1902)

ZVTM built these:

- IJzendijke–Drieschouwen Line (1914–1915)
- Sas van Gent–Zelzate (1915)
- Drieschouwen–Moerbeke Line (1916)
- Drieschouwen–Kloosterzande (1916)
- Philippine–Zaamslag (1916–1918)
- Pyramide–Hoofdplaat (1918)
- Zaamslag–Grote Huissenspolder (1926)
- Turkijensedijk–Stroopuit (1926)
- Hoofdplaat–Breskens (Roodenhoek 1927–1928)

ZVTM's built these freight only lines:

- IJzendijke–Stroopuit (sugar beet);
- Zaamslag–Grote Huissenspolder (sugar beet);
- Sas van Gent–Zelzate (sugar beet and construction material).

Other lines started as freight only and later also took passengers.

Rijkswaterstaat built this line for ZVTM in 1940:

- Kloosterzande–Perkpolderhaven

== Rolling stock ==
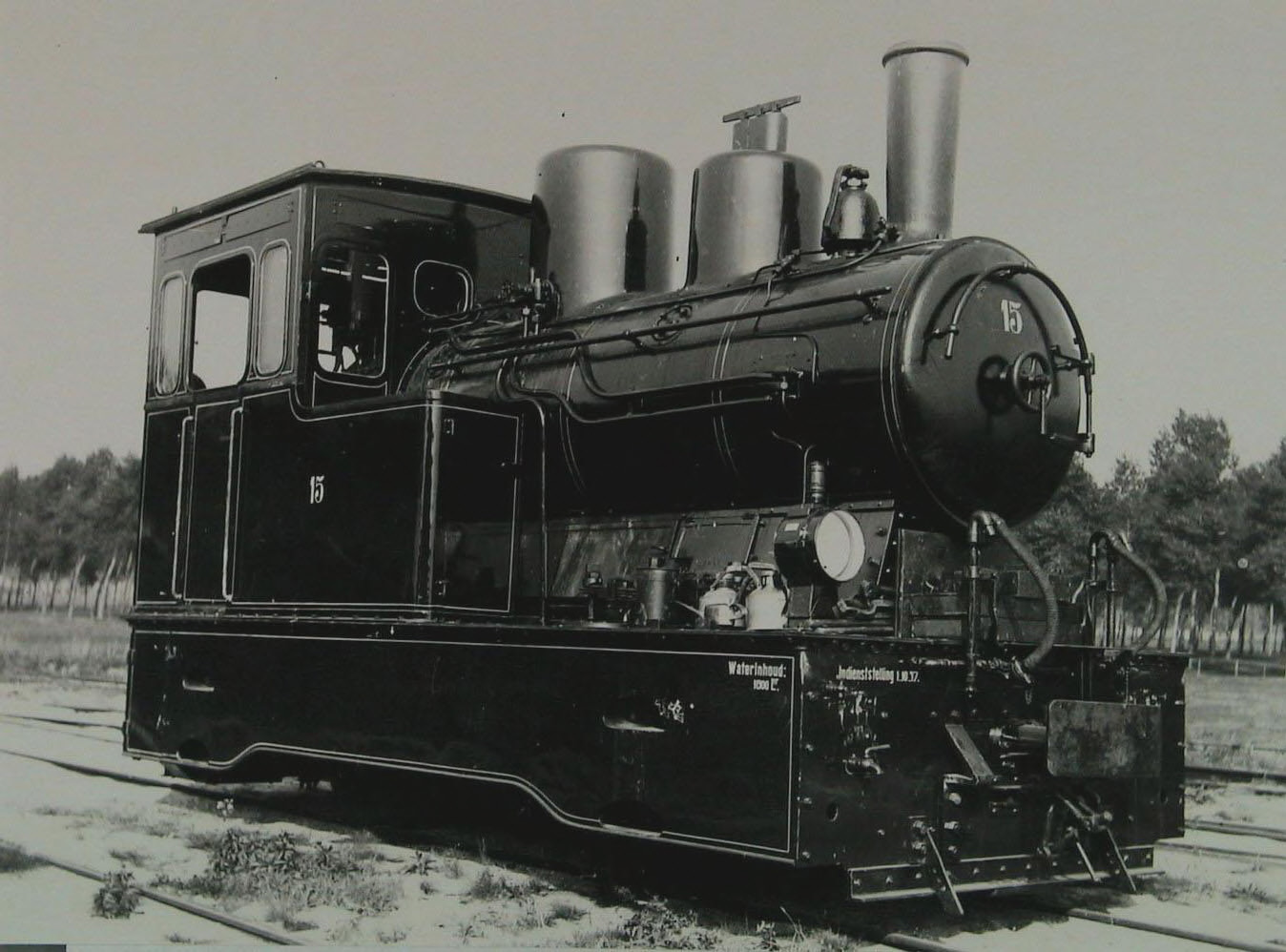
Locomotive 15 in Sas van Gent, 1917

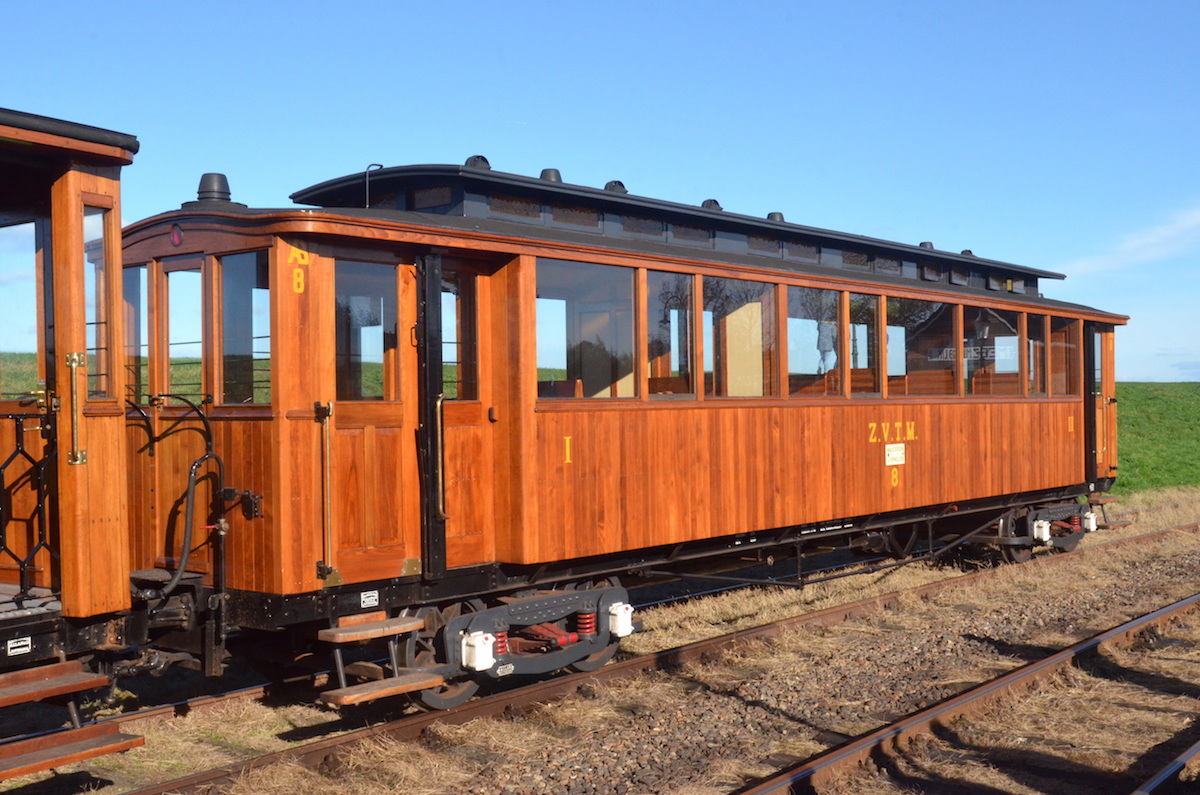
Carriage ZVTM AB 8 at the Hoorn–Medemblik heritage railway, in Medemblik 2018

ZVTM acquired three locomotives when it took over IJzSM. Before World War I, it ordered new locomotives at Arnold Jung Lokomotivfabrik. Only in May and June 1916, did it receive the first four of these. For a long time, ZVTM therefore depended on the old IJzSM locs and bought or hired materiel that was not very suitable. In August and October 1917, four more of the German locomotives arrived. In 1921, the last of the 17 locomotives (nummers 10–26) from Arnold Jung arrived. In 1929 bought three more (27–29) at Henschel. These 20 locomotives were built to a design by engineer D. Verhoop and weighed between 18 and 21t. Three other locomotives were acquired when it acquired SHW in 1918.

The first passenger transport by ZVTM was done using hired cars. In 1914–1916, Allan of Rotterdam built 16 (AB 1–16) four axled passenger cars with compartments for 15 first and 32 second class passengers. In 1930 La Brugeoise et Nicaise et Delcuve built three more (AB 17–19). In 1935-1936 five of these (two Allan and all three of La Brugeoise) were changed to diesel electric motor coaches (ME 15–19). In the late 1940s, these were sold to the RTM for service on the South Holland and Zeeland islands. The other Allan carriages were then broken up. SHW brought in six different passenger cars and IJzSM brought in three.

ZVTM had a large collection of freight cars in different sizes. Before World War I, it ordered 110 open freight cars of 10t at Métallurgique Nivelles. In October 1915, 20 were delivered, 10 others followed, but that was all. Twenty old cars were bought in Germany. A new order was then placed at Norddeutsche Waggonfabrik: 15 open 20t cars, 5 open 20t hopper cars, and 10 closed 10t cars. These were all delivered. An order for 30 open 10t cars and 30 open 10t hopper cars at Hannoversche Waggonfabrik was seized by the German state. In the end, the Belgian sugar factories provided 20 10t cars to transport beet to them. After the war, Hannoversche Waggonfabrik made 40 open 10t cars for ZVTM. In 1924, ZVTM got another 50 wagons. 20 had been built on account of the ENCB, 20 for Sas van Gent sugar factory, and 10 for its own account.

In 1943 ZVTM sold locomotive 21 to the Kriegsmarine on the German Frisian Island Wangerooge. It then served on the Wangerooger Inselbahn until 1953. After World War II it got the number DB 99 271.

=== Museum trams ===
Some ZVTM materiel has been preserved.

- Passenger car AB 8 (Allan, 1916) was preserved. After change to standard gauge, it was taken into service by the Hoorn–Medemblik heritage railway on 7 October 2011.
- Closed freight car D5 9 (La Brugeoise et Nivelles, 1930) is in Medemblik waiting to get renovated.
- The motor coach MABD 1602 Reiger is in use with the Stichting voorheen RTM in Ouddorp. In 1950 it was built on the chassis of the ZVTM motor coach ME 16.

=== Busses ===
Before World War II, ZVTM had a limited number of busses from different brands. When ZVTM changed to a bus-only company, it bought larger series, especially from the British Guy Motors. In the 1960s, many busses were bought second-hand. ZVTM also changed a lot of busses by building new bodies on old chassis. After 1971, busses were bought by NS. None of the ZVTM busses has been preserved.
