= Drieschouwen =

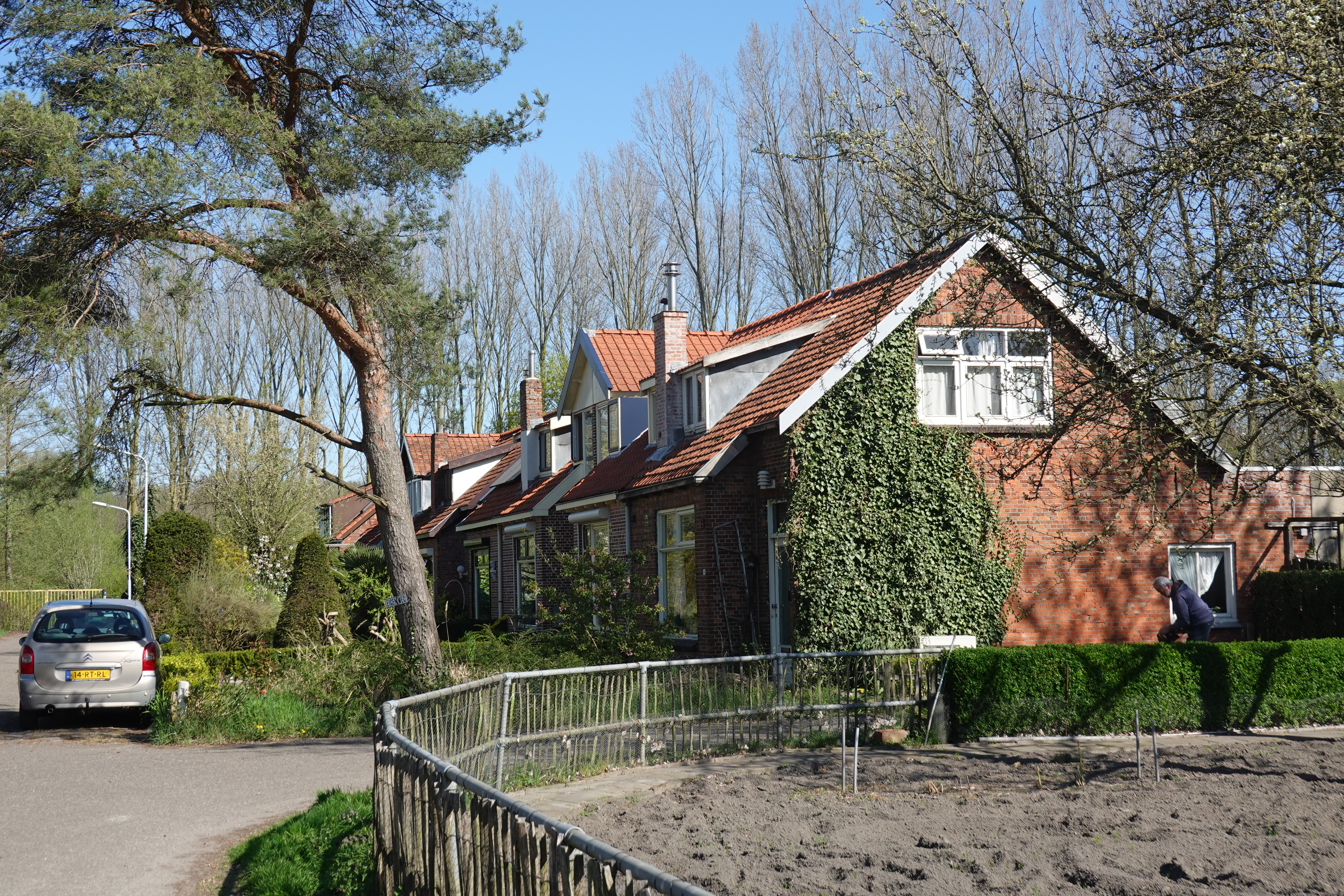
- Former ZVTM staff houses

- Location within Zeeland Location within Netherlands
- Coordinates: 51.256164°N 3.911364°E
- Country: Netherlands

Drieschouwen formerly De Drie Schouwen is a hamlet in Terneuzen municipality in Zeeland province, the Netherlands.

The hamlet has some small business and recreational areas. From 1916 till about 1948, it was the center of the tramways of eastern Zeelandic Flanders.

== History ==
Drieschouwen; originally 'Drie Schouwen',was named after three salterns that stood about 500 m south the small fortress town of Axel. Salterns were often placed outside of a city to reduce the risk of fire.

In the early 19th century, Drieschouwen was a usual stop for (horse) carriages going from Hulst to Terneuzen, and from Hulst to Sas van Gent. During the Belgian war of independence some field fortifications were made. There was also an inn called 'De Drie Schouwen'.

== Description ==
The hamlet consists of about twenty houses and a water tower; Axel water tower. The hamlet is on the Kinderdijk, Drieschouwen, and part of the Langeweg.

Drieschouwen is home to some small businesses. East of it are some sport fields and a small lake. The recreational area Smitschorre is to the west. This has a golf court and an airfield for gliders.

South of Drieschouwen is the provincial road N258. South of that is the industrial area 'Bedrijventerrein Drieschouwen'.

== Tramway center ==
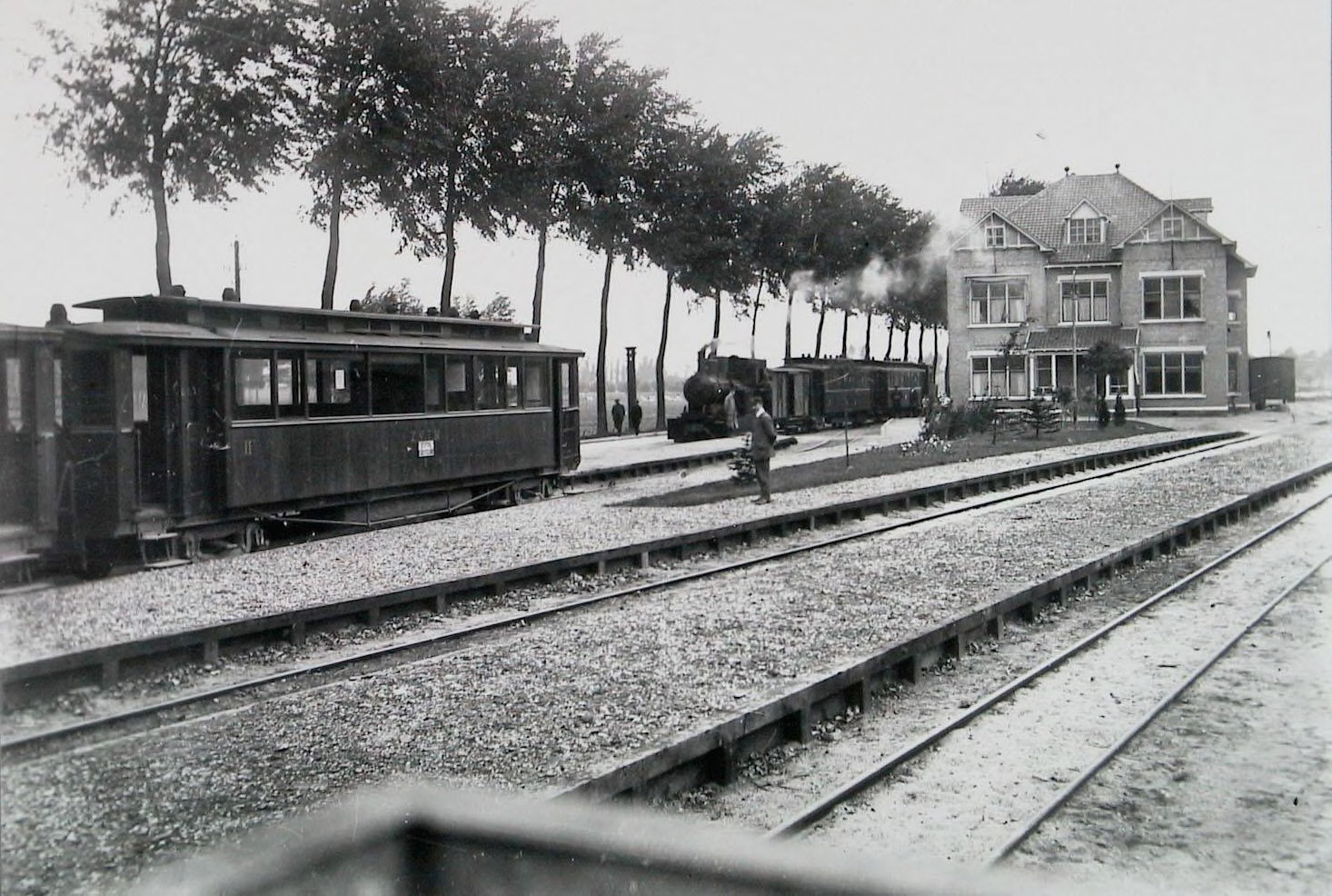
Tram station c. 1918

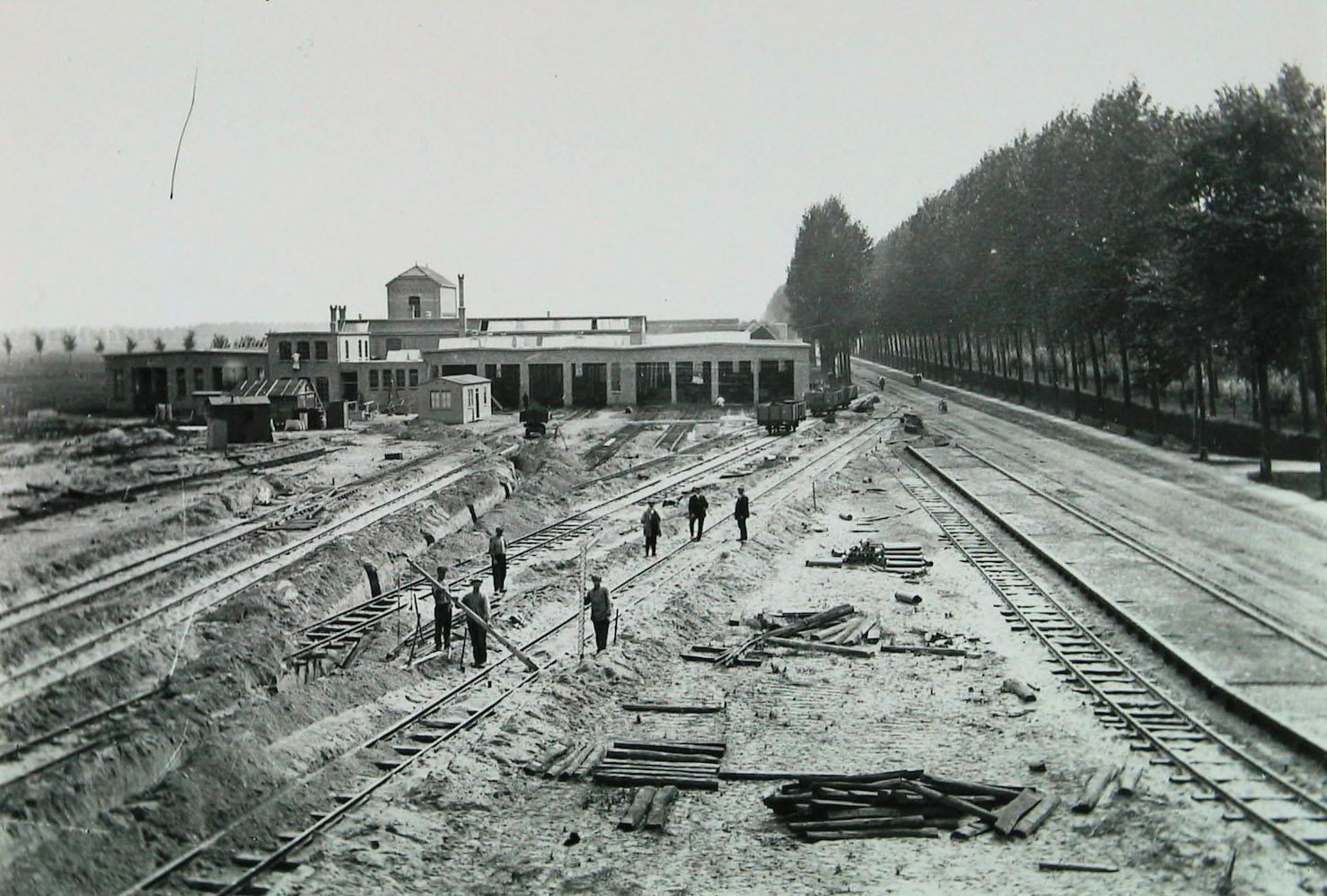
Construction of central train depot of ZVTM c. 1914

In 1911, the Zeeuwsch-Vlaamsche Tramweg Maatschappij was founded. This was a narrow-gauge railway or tramway. In 1916, this completed its first new railway, the IJzendijke–Drieschouwen Line, which ran from IJzendijke to Drieschouwen. Drieschouwen was a central location on its planned network, and so ZVTM decided to establish its headquarters here.

In June 1914, ZVTM tendered and gave orders for: a central office, a central train depot, central work sheds, a warehouse and a fuel depot all to be built in Drieschouwen. The central office was part of the tram station of Drieschouwen, it was north of the central train depot. Images show that at first the line from IJzendijke ended in front of the station. Later images show a line west of the station.

The office of the company was moved from Drieschouwen to the Scheldekade in Terneuzen on 12 October 1925.

Three lines connected at Drieschouwen:

- IJzendijke–Drieschouwen Line
- Drieschouwen–Kloosterzande (continuing to Walsoorden)
- Drieschouwen–Moerbeke Line (to Moerbeke Sugar Factory)

On 1 August 1948 passenger traffic ceased. In September 1949 freight traffic stopped and the tracks were broken up. What remains of the tramway in Drieschouwen are some small staff houses, and the big train depot, now used by small businesses.
