= Pyramide (Zeeland) =

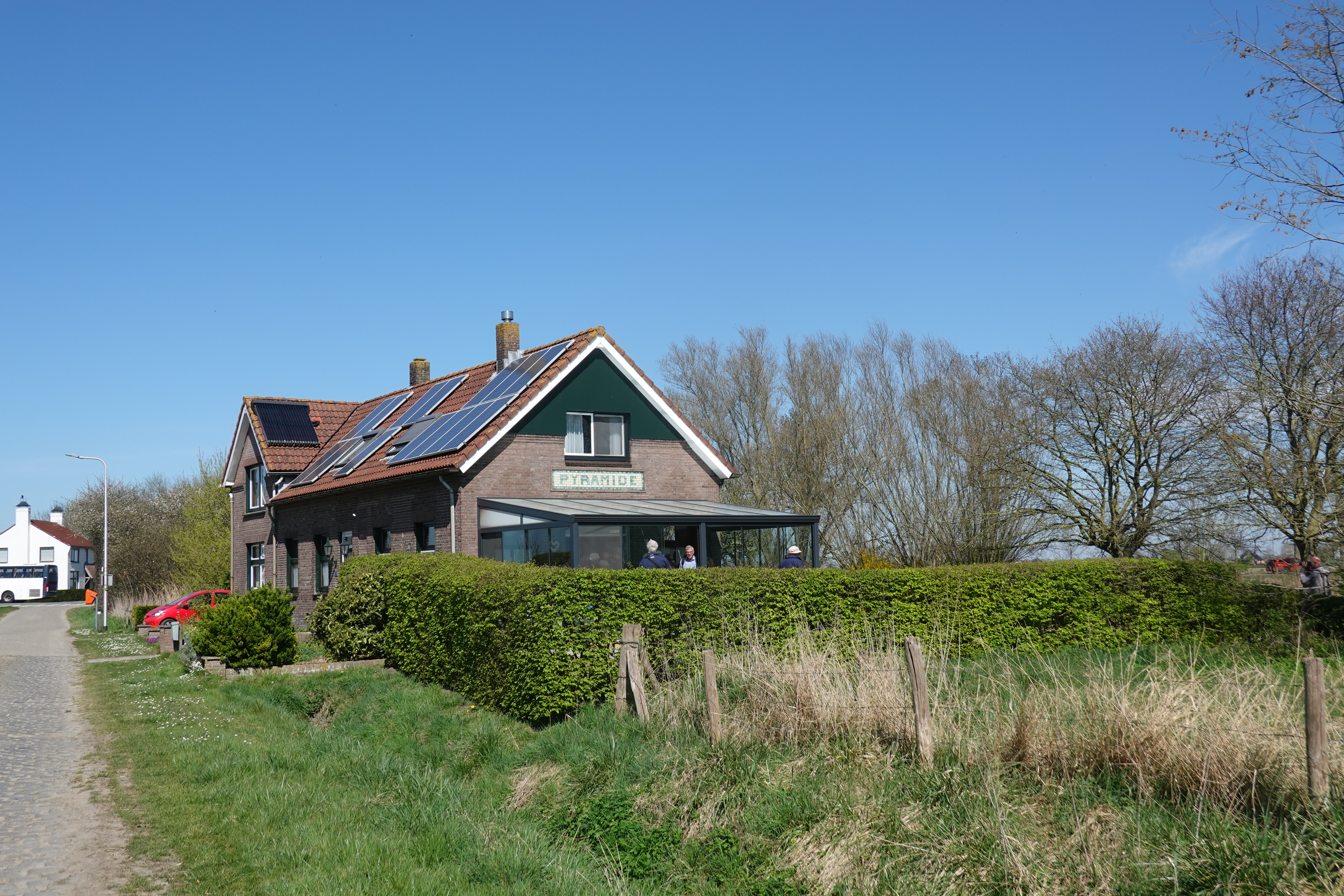
- Former tram station

- Location within Zeeland Location within Netherlands
- Coordinates: 51.301301°N 3.671465°E
- Country: Netherlands

Pyramide is a hamlet in Sluis municipality in Zeeland province, the Netherlands.

The hamlet Pyramide consists of about twenty houses, all located on a street that is also named 'Pyramide'. Two tramways once connected to Pyramide. These are gone. The station is now a normal house.

== History ==
The area where Pyramide now is, was formed by a fortification line called 'De Linie'. The idea was to make a canal from the Zwin to the Braakman. In 1769, the Passegeule water south of it was straigthened. In 1788, the Bakkersdam and Kapitalendam were built to ensure inundation south of the line. The line was not always effective against the French, but it seems to have served well during the 1830–1831 Belgian Revolution.

The name Pyramide, formerly written 'Piramide', is unusual for a hamlet. On a very detailed 1865 map, there is no reference to 'Pyramide' where the hamlet now is. It only depicts a house called 'Blaauwe Hofstede' just west of it. Other old maps show the tramway station that still exists, but no houses. Near the point where the tramway station is, some old maps mention an old battery called Pyramide, just west of another battery called Kapitalendam.

It therefore seems that there was an old battery called Pyramide. That later on, a tramway station was built near it. The hamlet Pyramide then seems to have emerged in the vicinity of this tramway station.

== The Tramway ==
In 1911, the Zeeuwsch-Vlaamsche Tramweg Maatschappij (ZVTM) was founded by a merger that gave it the Schoondijke–Veldzicht Line to start its business. From its station at IJzendijke, ZVTM then built its first new line, the IJzendijke–Drieschouwen Line, which opened in 1914/5. A station, or better, a stop, at a local tramway did not mean much.

The situation at Pyramide changed when in April 1918, the Pyramide–Hoofdplaat Line opened. This made Pyramide a real station. Passengers had to change trains and cargo had to be transloaded. Furthermore, railroad switches had to be operated etc. All of this required a local demand for labor.

In 1949, the tramway was closed and replaced by busses.
