= Sugar Factory Sas van Gent =

Coordinates: 51°13′28″N 3°47′42″E

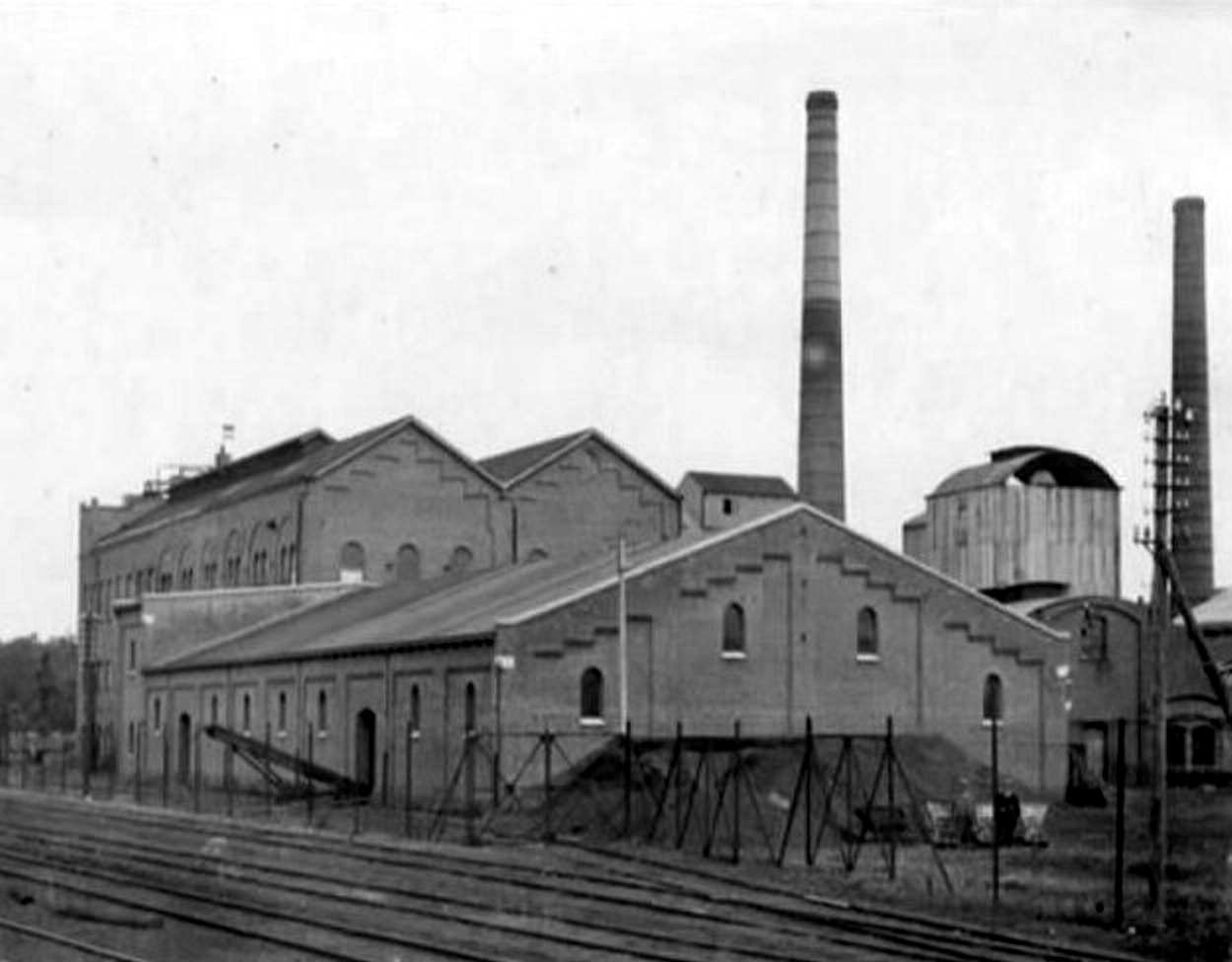
- NV Suikerfabriek Sas van Gent, c. 1880

- Location within Zeeland
- Built: 1872
- Location: Sas van Gent, Zeeland
- Industry: Sugar industry
- Defunct: 1987

The Sugar Factory Sas van Gent was a beet sugar factory in Sas van Gent, Zeeland, the Netherlands. It was located in the Poelpolder south of the town. It should not be confused with the Eerste Nederlandsche Coöperatieve Beetwortelsuikerfabriek located just north of the town.

The factory was part of multiple companies and therefore known by multiple names. At first it was part of the short lived independent company called: De Zeeuwsche Suikerfabriek. The Sucrerie Zélandaise that followed it was also not successful. The Beetwortelsuikerfabriek Sas van Gent, founded by sugar industrials from North Brabant fared better. In the 1920s, CSM took control of this company, and eventually the factory became an integral part of CSM. Due to overproduction, the factory was closed down in 1987.

The sugar factory had a profound impact on transport in Zeelandic Flanders. It gave a lot of work to the small agricultural harbors and played a role in the foundation of the narrow-gauge railway Zeeuwsch-Vlaamsche Tramweg Maatschappij.

== Context ==
The soil in the coastal areas of the Netherlands is very suitable for growing sugar beet. This also applies to Zeeland. However, when it comes to processing sugar beet, Zeeland lack the abundant amounts of clean fresh water that are needed. This explains that the factories that processed these beets were found in Zeelandic Flanders and in the west of North Brabant, i.e. Sugar Factory Zeeland.

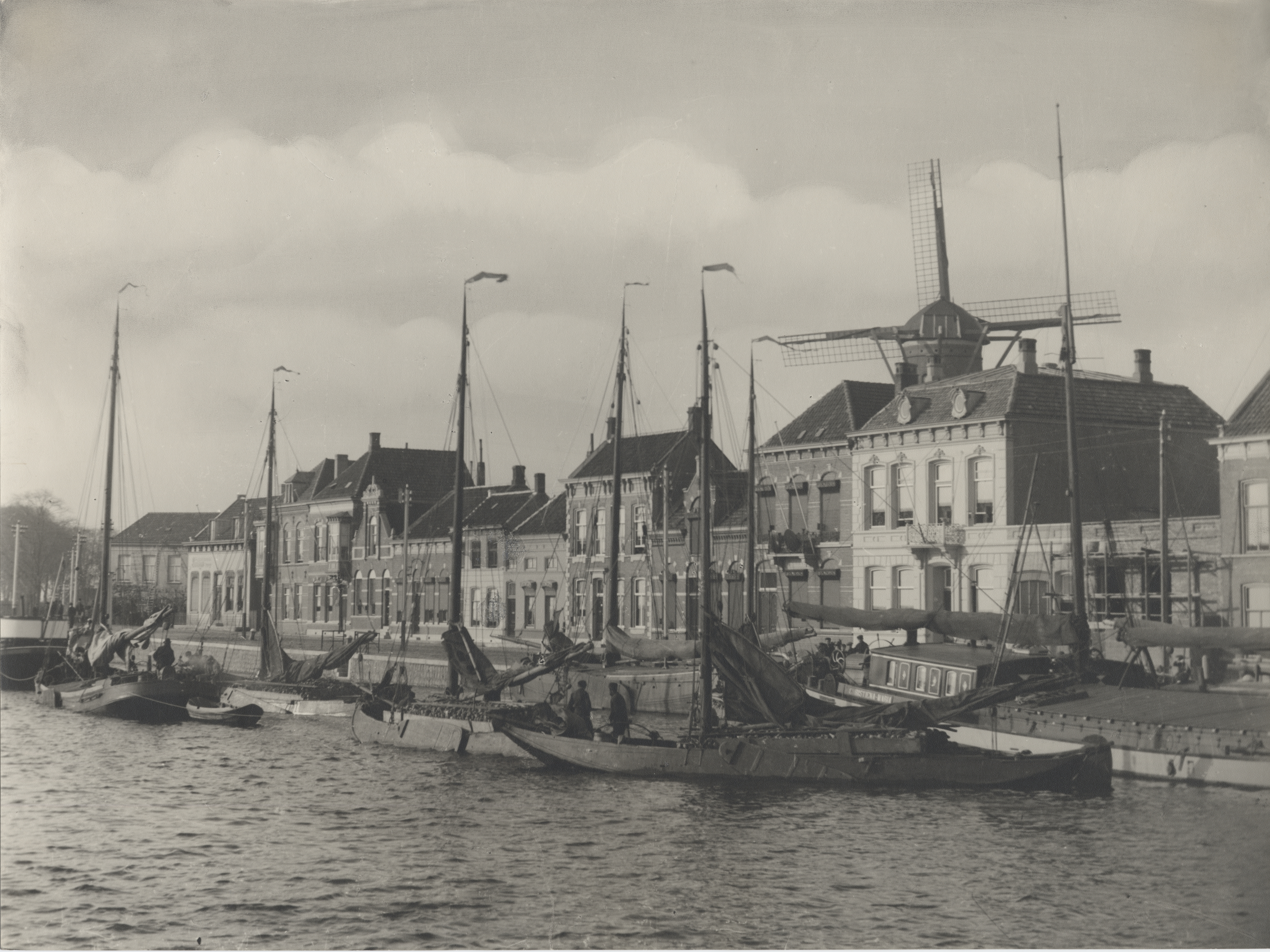
Tow of small barges with beet in Terneuzen

In Zeelandic Flanders, Sas van Gent had the best transport infrastructure in the second half of the 19th century. The sugar factory was located on a railway. Two of these connected to Flanders: The Belgian railway line 55 reached Sas van Gent in 1869. It still runs from Ghent to Terneuzen, but is now freight only. The Belgian railway line 54 from Mechelen to Sint-Niklaas used to connect to Terneuzen. This connection opened in 1871.

The Ghent–Terneuzen Canal is a ship canal. It was probably important to bring coal and lime to the factory. However, sugar beet were brought to the factory by barges. At the time, a barge was generally a vessel for inland navigation that had sails and living quarters.

The biggest transport challenge lay in transporting beet from the field to a barge or railway car. This could be done by horse drawn cart or wagons. In the low countries prams were also in general use. Prams were flat bottomed boats without masts and mostly without living quarters. They could go where barges could not. These were probably not used in Zeeuwsch Vlaanderen.

== De Zeeuwsche Suikerfabriek (1872-1876) ==
Plans to establish a beet sugar factory in Sas van Gent can be traced back to at least 1871. By then there were plans to build a factory on a terrain that adjoined the railway and the canal.

In early 1872, a joint-stock company called 'De Zeeuwsche Beetwortelsuikerfabriek' was founded. The share capital was 250,000 guilders divided in 100 shares of 2,500 guilders each. The board of directors of the new company was formed by August Soinne (4 shares), Julien de Borchgrave (3), and August Muyshondt (3). August Soinne was a merchant from Gent. Julien de Borchgrave was a landowner living in Sint-Gillis-Waas. August Muyshondt was a medical doctor and landowner from Zelzate. The supervisory board was formed by the Dutch Norbertus Kerckhaert (3 shares) and Polydore Charles François Pauwels (4).

Initially, there were no less than 34 shareholders. The members of the board of directors were probably those who took the initiative. They were mostly from Gent and can be linked to at least 27 shares. Shareholders living in Zeeuws Vlaanderen took 24 shares. Almost all of these were land owners and farmers. A third group came from Boussu in Hainaut. It consisted of the industrial François Dorzée, and the merchants Désiré Gain, and Irma Cambier and took 14 shares.

Establishing the factory cost between 450,000 and 500,000 guilders. In the winter of 1872-73, the factory started to operate. It finished its first campaign on 4 February 1873. The campaign was led by director J.W.A. Post and started late. Already during the first campaign, the Dutch government ordered the company to take measures to decrease the environmental impact.

Several court cases indicated that the company soon got into trouble. In March 1873, J.W.A. Post contracted to stay on as director of the factory. In August 1874, he started litigation against the board of directors for backward pay. A notary from Sas van Gent was also not paid. In 1876, the company was liquidated. In early June, the factory was auctioned. The grounds, buildings and machinery sold for only 22,000 guilders.

== La Sucrerie Zélandaise (1876-1882) ==
The very low price that the factory brought at the auction was probably the reason that a group of shareholders themselves bought the factory. On 30 June 1876, more or less the same shareholders that established the Zeeuwsche Suikerfabriek established a public company called Sucrerie Zélandaise. It had a share capital of 316,000 francs in 632 shares of 500 francs. Instead of paying for these shares, the shareholders brought in the factory that they had bought.

After the auction the factory continued to operate for a while. It was said to have employed 177 people in 1877. In 1879 it was said to have remained in being. In 1882 it was said to have been auctioned after a rather long period of inactivity.

== Beetwortelsuikerfabriek Sas van Gent (1882-1923) ==
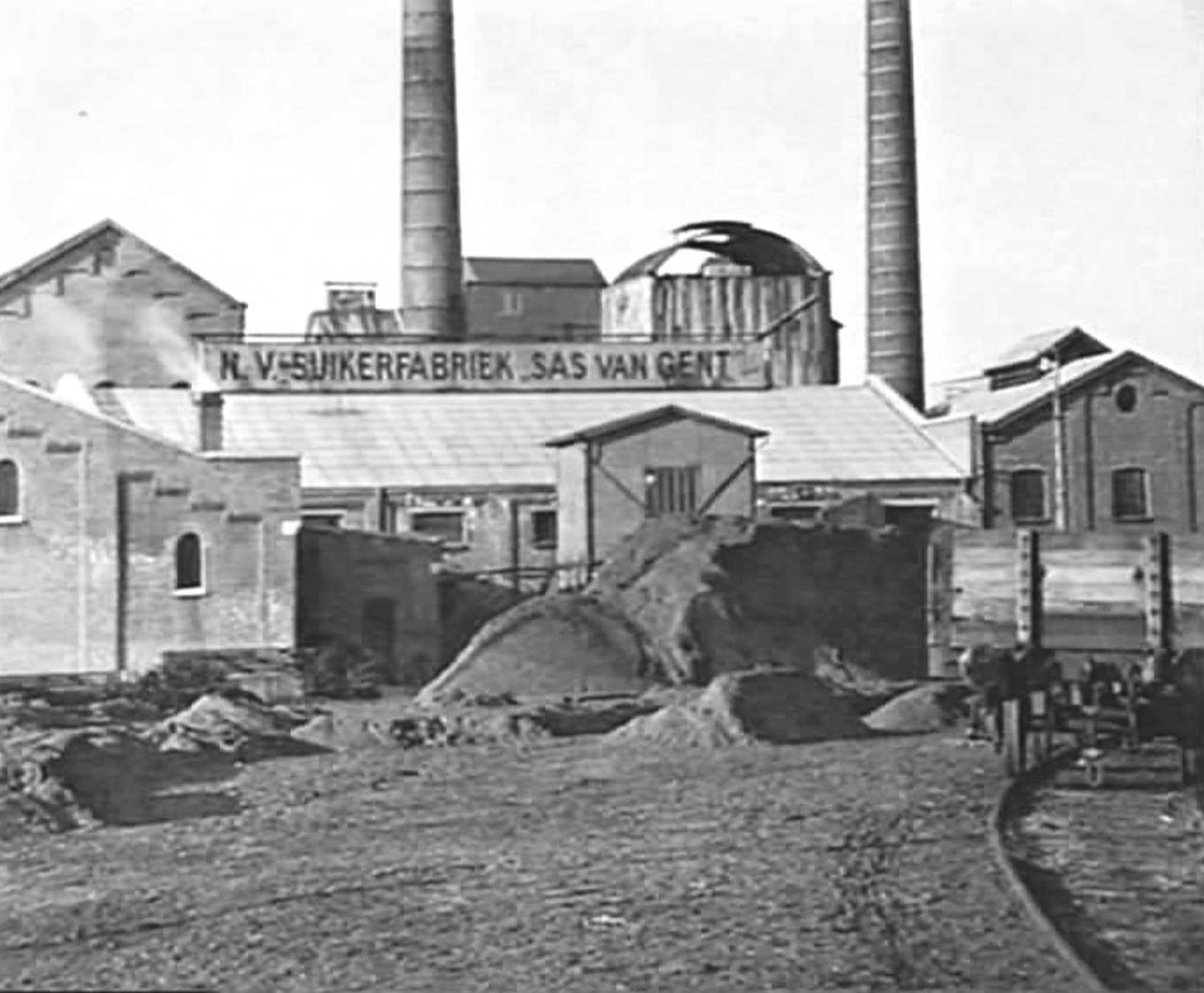
The factory c. 1880

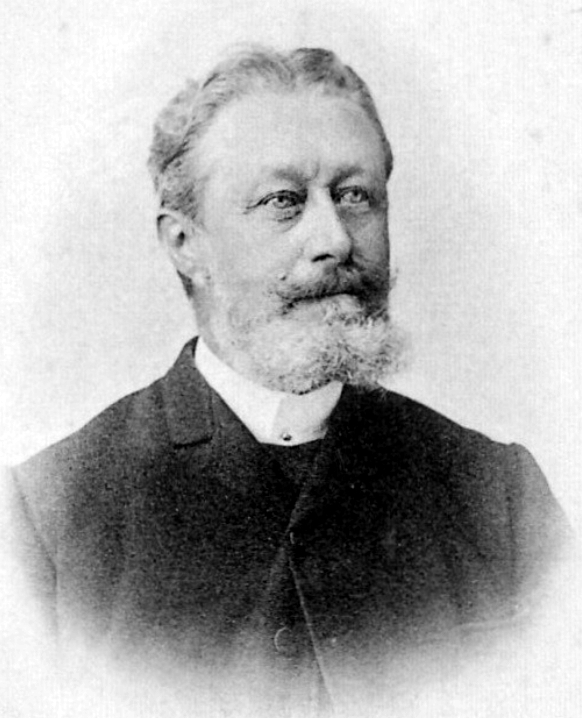
N.H.G. Malotaux

On 23 February 1882, the factory was auctioned for 135,000 Francs. It was acquired by W. Laane, a banker from Roosendaal. Laane had started his bank in Roosendaal in 1860, and had developed very close ties with the numerous sugar manufacturing companies in the west of North Brabant. Laane no doubt knew what he was doing. On 15 July 1882, he established the company N.V. Beetwortelsuikerfabriek Sas van Gent.

The new company Beetwortelsuikerfabriek Sas van Gent had a share capital of 150,000 guilders divided in 30 shares of 5,000 guilders each. Laane brought in the factory for 13 shares. H.J. Binsfeld, H.B. Jäger, A.C. Granpré Molière, and N.H.G. Malotaux each took two shares. Banker J.J.T. Chabot from Scheveningen took six shares. C. Loeff from Leeuwarden, O.D.J. Bagelaar from Breda, and banker S.S.A. Chabot from Rotterdam each took a single share. For these 17 shares, 85,000 guilders were paid.

Nicolas Henri Gabriel Malotaux (1831-1897) would become the new director of the factory. He was Dutch, but of French descent. From 1850 to 1870, he had been director of the Sucreries et Raffineries Valenciennes. In 1870 he had fled back to Bergen op Zoom on account of the Franco-Prussian War.

That same year 1882, the factory became operational again, employing 178 people. The 1886-1887 campaign ended already on 27 December. By that time, 175 employees had processed 11,000,000 kg of sugar beet, resulting in 900,000 kg of raw sugar. Over 1891, the company paid a dividend of 10%.

In 1895, an observer noted that the factory was capable processing 25,000t of beet. He noted that to realize such a processing capacity, an investment of 500,000 guilders was required. He therefore concluded that the shareholders kept most of the profit in the company instead of handing it to the shareholders. During the 1898-1899 campaign over 40,000,000 kg of beet were processed.

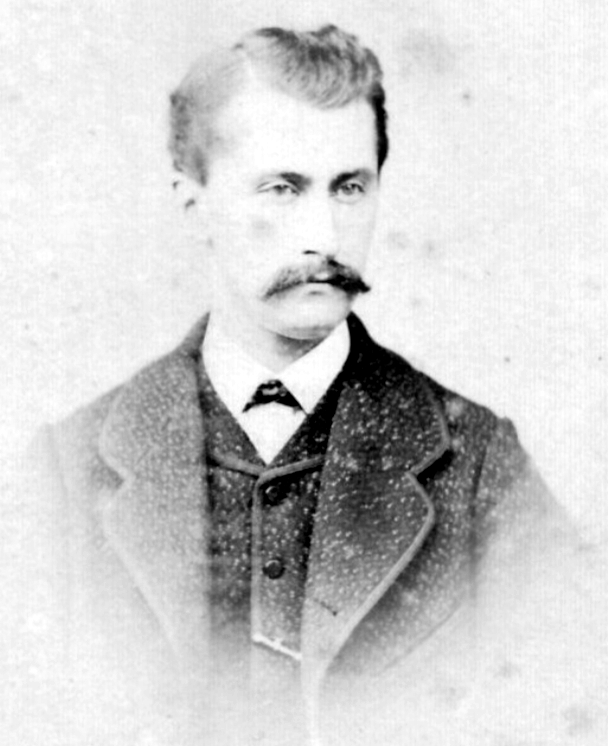
Pierre Malotaux (1863-1918)

In 1897, Pierre Malotaux (1863-1918) succeeded his deceased father as director of the factory. Pierre Malotaux was quite active. In 1891, he became a member of the municipal council of Sas van Gent. In 1894 he married Anne Mathilde Cécile Nijst. On the occasion he was labeled as an 'industrial'. Piere would participate in numerous ventures. In July 1902, he invested 500 guilders for a 1/15th share in the foundation of the small Catholic newspaper 'Zelandia' in Hulst. In August 1902, he invested 7,000 guilders (or 7%) in the foundation of the NV Walzenmolen Sas van Gent.

In 1900, the competing sugar factory Eerste Nederlandsche Coöperatieve Beetwortelsuikerfabriek began to operate just north of Sas van Gent. This was a cooperative company, owned by the farmers who grew the sugar beet. The fact that it cost about 700,000 guilders to establish the competing factory confirmed the previous observation about the Beetwortelsuikerfabriek Sas van Gent being worth more than its official capital.

The existing sugar factories reacted by founding the Union Sucrière. This was a cooperative that aimed to eliminate competition between the factories that bought sugar beet in Zeeland. The idea was that the appointment of exclusive agents within strict geographical boundaries, would put an end to the factories competing for the farmers' beet. The new company had 5 Dutch and 9 Belgian members in the Netherlands and Belgium.

The first years of the 20th century were difficult for sugar production. In 1891 production of sugar beet was 31,000t, by 1902 it had become 200,000t and sugar prices were low. In 1901/2 7 sugar beet factories had been left idle. In the 1902/3 campaign, Malotaux's factory was idle.

In early 1904, the Nouvelle Union Sucrière was founded after the expiry of the Union Sucrière. It had five members: Malotaux in Sas van Gent, Wittouck in Selzaete, Tijdgadt in Selzaete, Mechelijnck in Gent, and Moerbeke Sugar Factory. In Zeeuws Vlaanderen, this smaller combination was still powerful, because it bought 85% of the sugar beet grown in the area.

During World War I, it seemed that the factory would become very busy, because the export of sugar beet was banned. When this ban was lifted in September 1915, the factory fired 60 workers. In early 1917, many families in Sas van Gent and other parts of Zeeland got coal from the factory. In November and December 1917, the factory was bombarded by mistake. When the Dutch economic situation became very difficult in 1918, the state issued quota for every beet sugar factory. Malotaux's factory was allowed to process 56,240t, the ENCB 68,800t. In early 1918, Pierre Malotaux left Sas van Gent.

In April 1918, Amand Gustave Stubbé, Chief Bookkeeper of the company, became its new director. Stubbé also succeeded Malotaux as Wethouder of Sas van Gent.

After World War I the factory had to face a lot of problems. First of all, from 1908 to 1918 six more cooperative sugar factories were built. These were generally more modern and larger than the private companies. Another trend was that wages rose much faster than the sugar price. On top of that, the United Kingdom started to develop its own, protected beet sugar industry. In 1919, most private companies then merged into the Centrale Suiker Maatschappij (CSM). The private sugar factory in Sas van Gent was one of the few that stayed out of CSM.

The first post war campaign in 1919 saw the factory processing 55,000t of beet with a small interruption. The campaign of 1920 probably also went OK, though the factory suffered from a strike among the skippers of the N.V. Mij. Vrachtvaart. It made that part of the supplied beet degraded on board the barges.

The 1921/2 campaign was disastrous, with a loss of almost 1,000,000 guilders. This made that in early 1922, the company was unable to pay for all the sugar beet that it had processed. One of the reasons was that it had bought beet at a much higher price than the competition. The problems probably induced the company to contract with CSM on buying and processing beet.

== Daughter company of CSM ==
In early 1923, the board of N.V. Beetwortelsuikerfabriek Sas van Gent decided to rent out the factory to Centrale Suiker Maatschappij (CSM) for six years. The owners of the 4.5% bonds had to agree to this proposal, as during these six years, CSM would pay the rent. In case of bankruptcy CSM would be responsible for the bonds. The creditors probably did not like this proposal, because soon, CSM offered to buy the bonds at their nominal value plus accrued interest. However, many holders of the bonds were not keen to accept this proposal. Soon after, the board of the factory then announced it cancelled its proposal and would pay off the entire loan by 1 May 1923. The conclusion is simple; instead of waiting for the remaining bondholders to offer their bonds, CSM gave credit to the company so it could pay off the bonds. In return, it obviously got control over the company. The board then executed its plan to rent the factory to CSM.

In the 1923 campaign, the board of the Sas van Gent company cut the salary of the workers that unloaded the beet onto the terrain by 30%. It resulted in a strike. It ended in a compromise that lowered their wages by only 12.5%. The 1923/4 campaign would be intterrupted by lack of beet at least three times. This of course increased cost. During the 1926/7 campaign the factory processed 72,400t of beet vs. 99,500t for the local cooperative competitor.

Director Stubbé died on 3 August 1928. He would not get a successor. Instead, A. Hamerlinck was appointed as technical director. Hamerlinck had started his career at the factory at age 14! He would successfully lead the factory for decades.

Somewhat before the 1928/9 campaign, the factory decreased the wages for laborers by 6%. Just after the start of the campaign, the Socialist Union then issued an ultimatum. It would go on strike if the company did not restore wages to their previous levels. The affair made a lot of noise, but ended in a solid defeat for the Socialist Union. CSM simply forwarded the beet meant for Sas van Gent to other factories.

Even before the start of the Great Depression in 1929, the Dutch sugar industry was in crisis. This was probably best expressed in the price that manufacturers paid to the farmers. From 1921 to 1927/8 this had been between 20.43 and 30.97 guilders at the Sugar Factory Dinteloord. In 1929, it would pay only about 16.70 guilders per ton. Production cost was estimated at between 15 and 16 guilders.

In May 1929, the company decided to leave the factory idle in the 1929/30 campaign, citing a shortage of beet. It fired all but about 10 of the 62 permanent staff. It meant no work for 450 laborers during the campaign. The crisis became so bad that the almost new cooperative Sugar Factory Zeeland was liquidated in 1930. As the Zeeland had been founded to process beet from Zeeland, this might have been the reason for CSM to use its Sas van Gent factory in the 1930/1 campaign. The factory was also used in the 1931/2 campaign, but due to the lack of beet, this would become the shortest in thirty years. Even while it was one of the limited number of factories that was used, the factory processed only about 50,000t in 1931. In 1932/3 this was better with 70,000t. The factory was also active in the 1933/4 campaign.

== The factory becomes part of CSM ==
By September 1943, the company Beetwortelsuikerfabriek Sas van Gent was being disbanded. The factory now became a regular part of CSM.

During World War II, sugar factories faced shortages of resources. On 19 September 1944, Sas van Gent was liberated. As a consequence of the fighting and the chaotic logistical situation, the 1944/5 campaign was very bad for the factory. The 1946/7 campaign was better, but overall production still fell short of demand. It was only during the 1958/9 campaign that the Netherlands had enough beet sugar to export it.

Sugar production then began to outpace demand. This led to a drive to build ever larger sugar factories to profit from economies of scale. An obvious idea was to close one of the sugar factories in Sas van Gent. In 1964, the cooperative factories attempted to buy CSM, but failed. This attempt was made while the European Common Market Organization for Sugar was under development. In September 1966, the remaining four cooperative sugar factories merged to become Suiker Unie.

Meanwhile, environmental problems persisted. In November 1975, there was a conflict between the municipal and provincial authorities. The latter wanted to close the factory just after the campaign had started, but the municipality let the factory continue. Part of the problem was that the factory used oil for fuel. At the time, the factory had 140 employees and 60 seasonal laborers. In late 1976, the level of hydrogen sulfide emitted by the factory almost led to its closure.

In January 1987, CSM announced that it would close the factory. It said the factory was too small to remain profitable and that there was over capacity.

== Transport to and from the factory ==
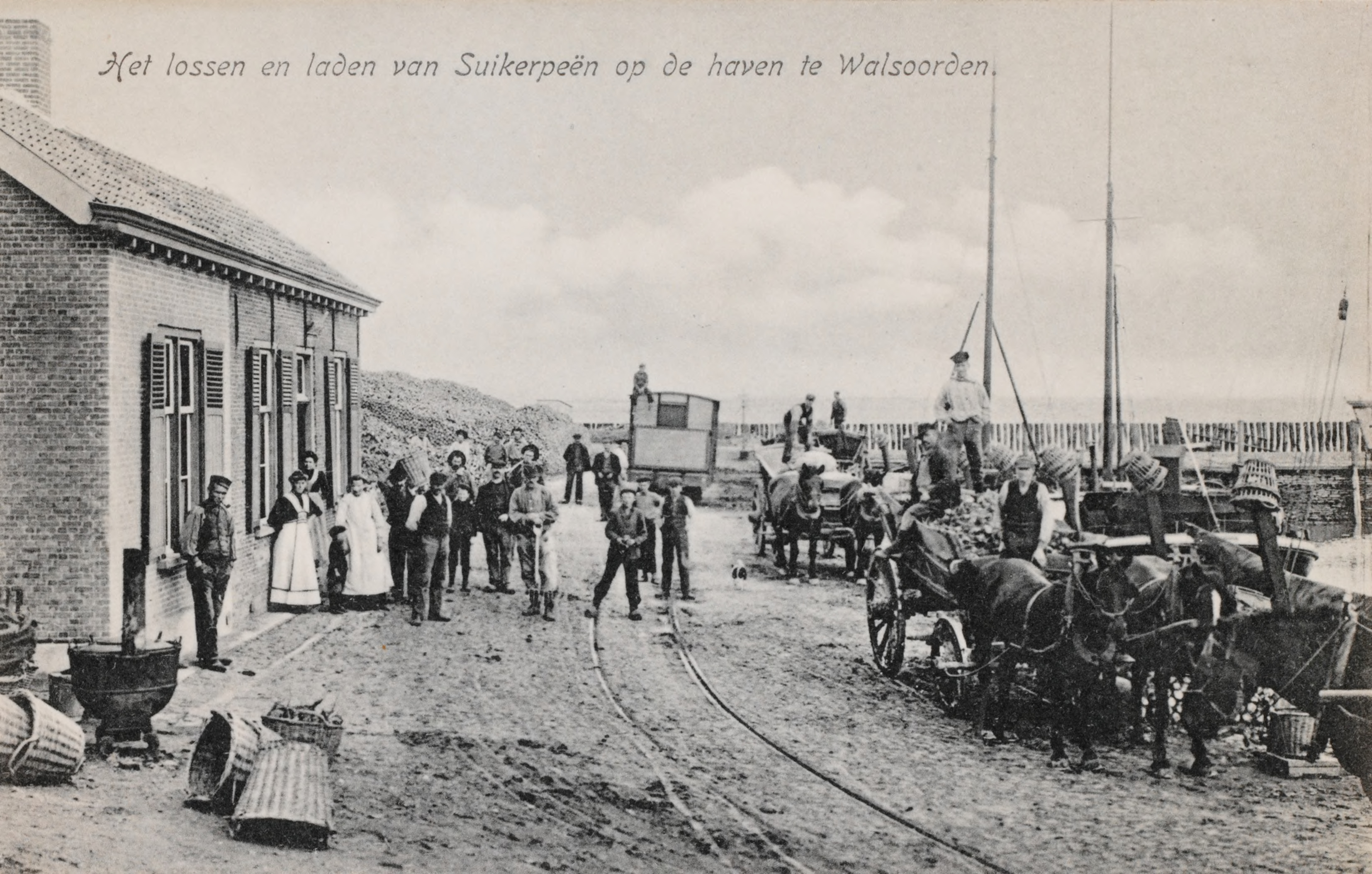
Transloading sugarbeet in Walsoorden

Sugar beet grown in Zeeuws Vlaanderen were loaded on barges in Terneuzen, Walsoorden, at Griete, and at De Paal (Graauw municipality). The agricultural harbor of Griete was the municipal tidal harbor of Zaamslag located at Kleine Huissenspolder. In 1898, it handled 8,215,620 kg of beet. Other beet were transported by rail and road. In 1910, the harbor of Philippine was used to send 300t of sugar beet to Malotaux's factory and 9,650t to other factories in the area.

Some details are known about transport to and from the factory. In October 1875, a barge loaded with sugarbeet from Margarethapolder in Zaamslag sank before Terneuzen. It was on its way to Sas van Gent. In October 1889, a Prussian barge sank an unnamed Westerling Barge with sugar beet for the factory on the Ghent–Terneuzen Canal. The Westerling was a barge type of 60-160t and was primarily found in west Belgium. In October 1906, an iron barge (Aak) sank near Baarland. It was on its way with sugar beet from De Paal with destination Sas van Gent. In November 1910, an iron barge with beet for 'Malotaux's factory in Sas van Gent' sank in the Brakman.

In the early 20th century, narrow-gauge railways were also very important for transporting sugar beet. In December 1902, the steam tramway from Hulst to Walsoorden was opened. Next to transporting people, it would make a good profit from transporting sugar beet. Plans to create a narrow-gauge railway throughout Zeelandic Flanders, were heavily influenced by the interests of the sugar factories. In 1912, these led to the foundation of the Zeeuwsch-Vlaamsche Tramweg Maatschappij (ZVTM).
