= Eerste Nederlandsche Coöperatieve Beetwortelsuikerfabriek =

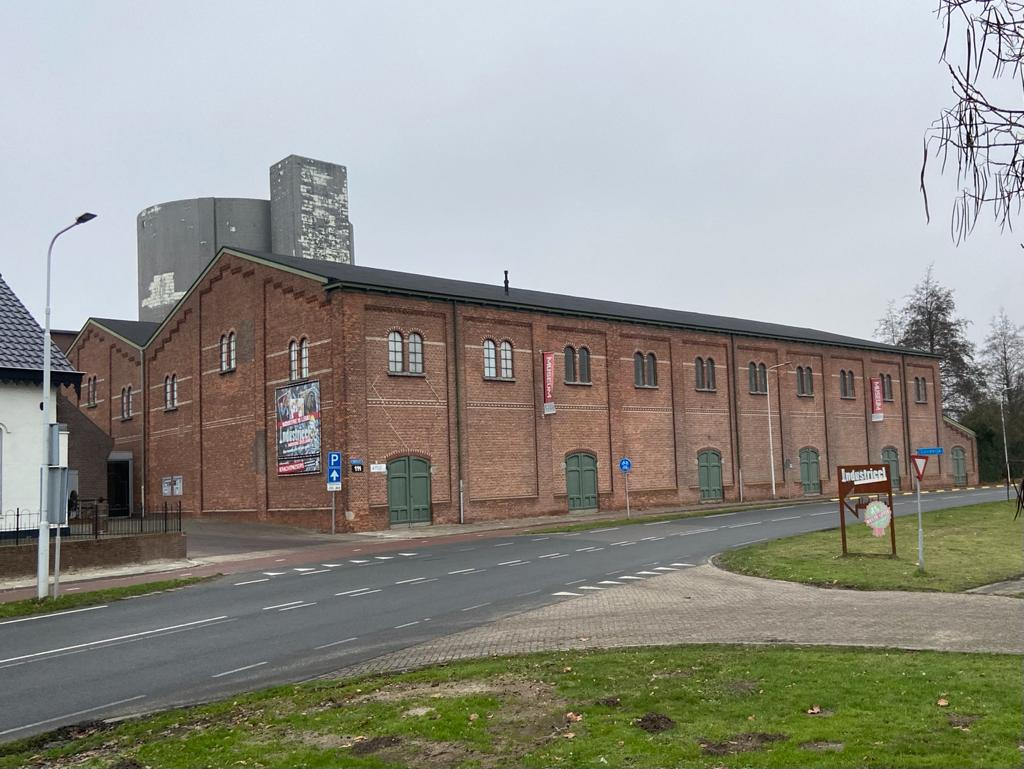
- Old factory warehouses on Westkade 114, Sas van Gent, now Zeeland Industry Museum
- Industry: Beet Sugar manufacturing
- Founded: 19 October 1899
- Defunct: 1989 (the factory)
- Fate: Merged into Suiker Unie 1970
- Headquarters: Sas van Gent, Netherlands
- Products: White sugar

The Eerste Nederlandsche Coöperatieve Beetwortelsuikerfabriek (CBS) was a company and beet sugar factory in Sas van Gent, Zeelandic Flanders. It should not be confused with the older Sugar Factory Sas van Gent in the same place.

The company was a cooperative. It remained independent till 1966, when it merged into the cooperative Suiker Unie. The factory operated from 1899 to 1989. It processed sugar beet to produce white sugar. In the 1950s, it also processed cane sugar for a few years. In the end, the factory was closed due to the concentration in the European Sugar Industry.

One of the remaining buildings of the factory now houses the Zeeland Industry Museum.

== History ==
The Eerste Nederlandsche Coöperatieve Beetwortelsuikerfabriek, or First Dutch Beet Sugar Factory Cooperative was founded on 19 October 1899. In Zeeland, the cultivation of sugar beet was boosted by the disappearance of the cultivation of the common madder, a plant traditionally grown in the area for dying fabrics.

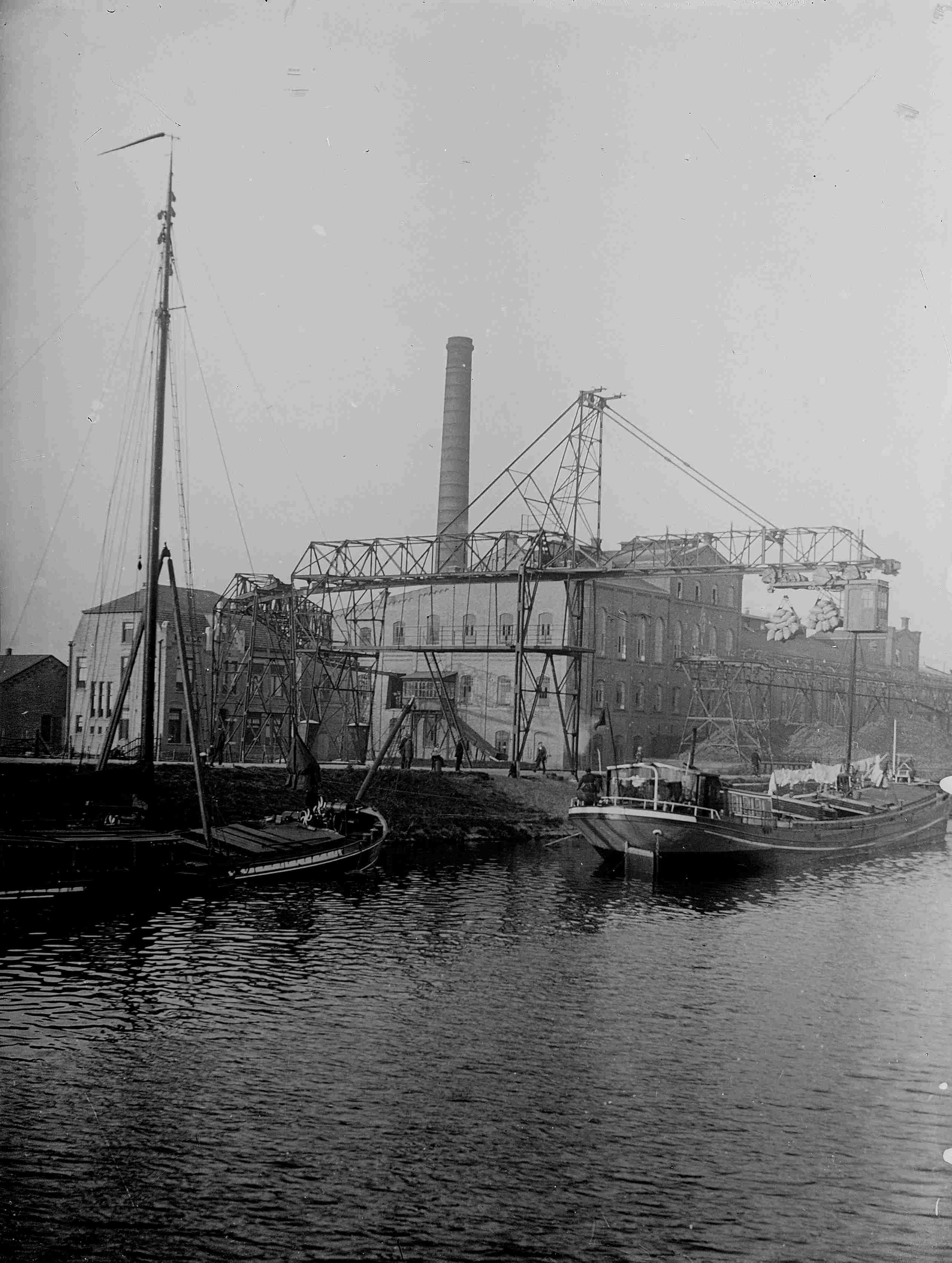
Factory on the canal, 1921

Growing sugar beet became economical in Zeeland when Sas van Gent got its first sugar factory in 1872. However, this was private property, and beet farmers could not protect their interests if they acted alone. Therefore, several cooperatives were founded by sugar beet farmers. E.g. in 1876 they founded the first cooperative for buying artificial fertilizers. Another cooperative was the 'Vereniging van Landbouwers die suikerbieten verbouwen' (Society of farmers that grow sugar beet). On 9 March 1892 this decided to investigate the possibility to build a cooperative beet sugar factory. The support of Baron K.J.A.G Collot d'Escury and Vorsterman van Oyen was instrumental for the success of this plan. In the end 173 farmers, including some from Zuid-Beveland, promised to cultivate 10,000 hectares of sugar beet, and founded the Eerste Nederlandsche Coöperatieve Beetwortelsuikerfabriek. It was the first cooperative sugar factory in the Netherlands.

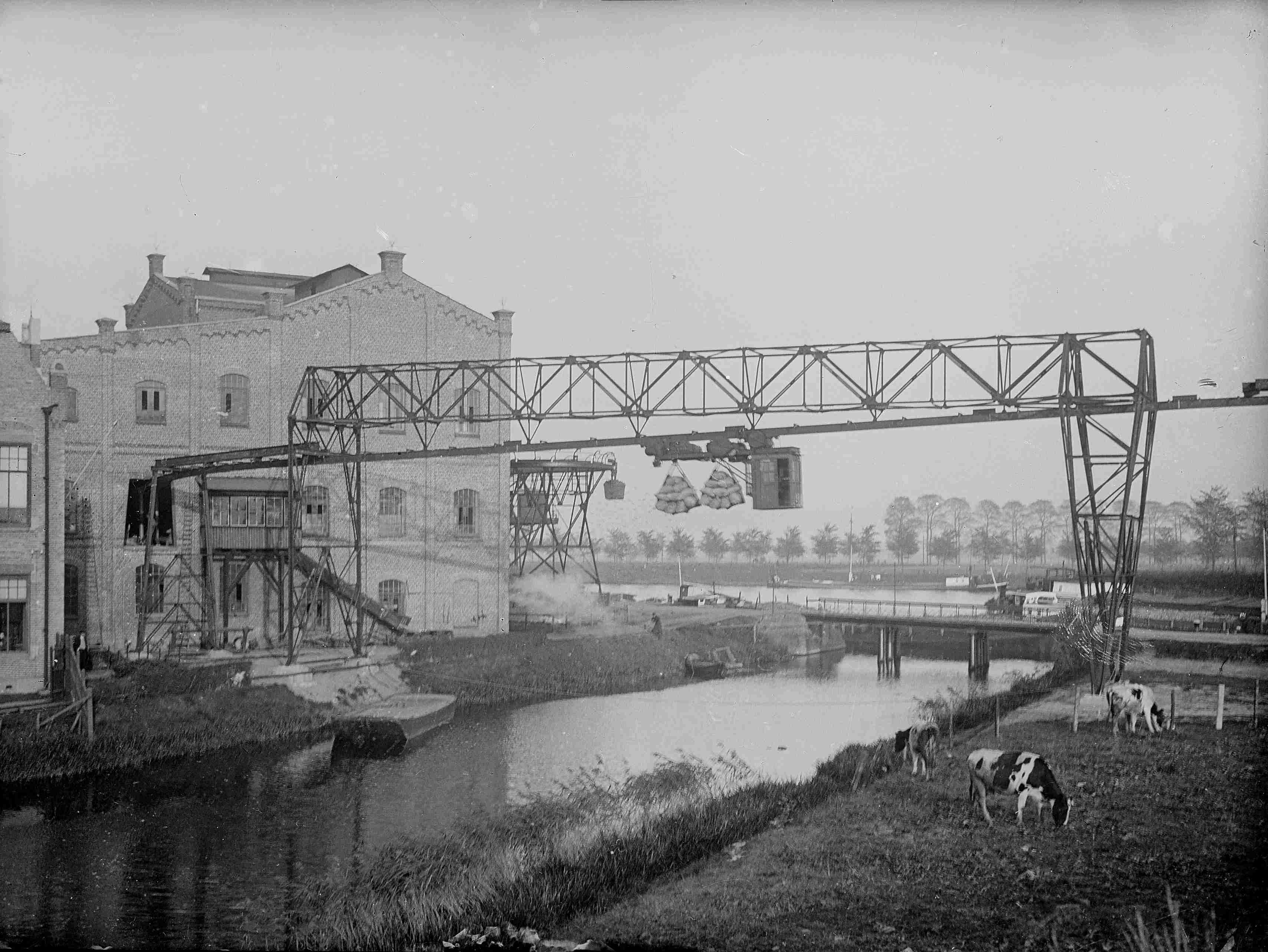
From the south, 1921

The reasons that the foundation of the cooperative sugar factory took so much time, were primarily in the huge investments. The price of the shares was 400 guilders. The members brought in 130,000 guilders and had to borrow the rest of the estimated cost of 700,000 guilders.

The location of the cooperative's beet sugar factory would be in Sas van Gent, directly on the Ghent–Terneuzen Canal, central in Zeelandic Flanders, and in direct reach from across the Scheldt. The reason to opt for Zeelandic Flanders was that the rest of Zeeland did not have enough fresh water for the production of sugar. In October 1900 the first campaign started with a daily capacity of 400 tonnes. Within a year this was increased to 700 tonnes. However cost overruns and a sudden decrease in sugar prices then almost destroyed the company.

In general, the factory grew steadily over many years. It was regularly expanded and updated with new techniques. In 1924 the daily capacity was 1,300 tonnes. During that year's jubilee, the presence of the minister for agriculture Charles Ruijs de Beerenbrouck and about 1,000 other national and foreign guests underlined the national interest in the factory.

The success of the cooperative sugar factory and its founders led others to follow. A second cooperative sugar factory was founded in Dinteloord in 1908, and by 1916 there were seven. The non-cooperative sugar factories reacted by a concentration of their factories and in 1919 they founded the NV Centrale Suikermaatschappij (CSM).

In 1947 the sugar manufacturing companies in Dinteloord, Roosendaal and Zevenbergen decided to merge and form the Verenigde Coöperatieve Suikerfabrieken (VCS) with head office in Dinteloord. The merger would allow the factory in Roosendaal to be closed down, evading necessary investments of 2,000,000 guilders. The Eerste Nederlandsche Coöperatieve Beetwortelsuikerfabriek remained independent and began to name itself ENCBS or CBS.

After a modernization, the sugar factory also began to refine cane sugar in 1957. It therefore changed its name to 'Eerste Nederlandsche Coöperatieve Beetwortelsuikerfabriek en Raffinaderij GA'. Though its location on the Scheldt was ideal, this activity ended after only a few years.

== Part of a larger company ==
In 1966 the four sugar cooperatives: ENCBS (Sas van Gent), VCS (Dinteloord), Friesch-Groningse (Groningen and Puttershoek) began to work under a new top cooperative: Suiker Unie (now owned by Royal Cosun). In 1970 the about 10,000 farmers became direct participants in Suiker Unie, and the separate cooperatives were disbanded.

As a part of Suiker Unie, the sugar factory in Sas van Gent increased its capacity to 260,000 tonnes after big investments in buildings and machinery.

== The end ==
In the 1980s both Suiker Unie and its competitor Centrale Suikermaatschappij (CSM) felt the need for concentration of production facilities in order to lower cost of new investments. At the same time lower transport cost meant that it was no longer required to be located close to the beet farmers.

In 1986 CSM decided to close her sugar factory in Sas van Gent. In 1987, Suiker Unie closed her factory in Zevenbergen. In 1989 it became clear that Suiker Unie's Eerste Nederlandsche Coöperatieve Beetwortelsuikerfabriek in Sas van Gent would be next. That year's campaign closed with a record production of 285,000 tonnes. Since then, sugar beet from Zeeland are processed in the west of North Brabant.

== Industry Museum Zeeland ==
A big sugar silo and the factories warehouses are still standing. Since 2015 are used by the Zeeland Industry Museum.
