= 1805 in Russia =

- Decades: 1780s; 1790s; 1800s; 1810s; 1820s
- See also: History of Russia; Timeline of Russian history; List of years in Russia

Events from the year 1805 in Russia

== Incumbents ==
- Monarch – Alexander I

== Events ==
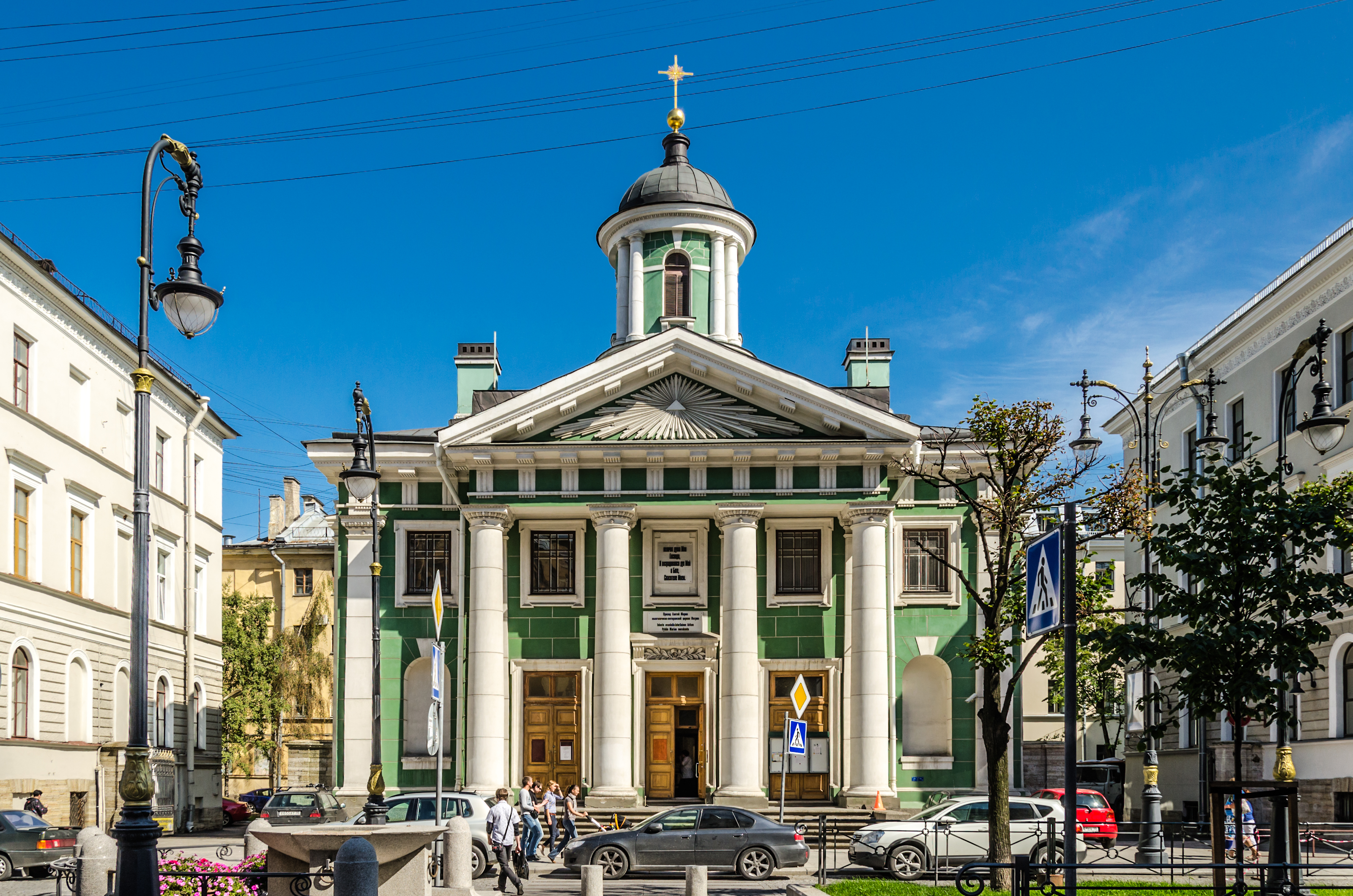
Saint Mary's Lutheran Church in St. Petersburg

- Russo-Persian War (1804–1813)
  - May 14: Treaty of Kurakchay - Karabakh Khanate vassalized
  - May 21: Shaki Khanate vassalized
  - July 3–27: Karyagin's Raid
  - October 20: Shoragel sultanate surrenders
  - December 27: Shirvan Khanate submits
- War of the Third Coalition against France
  - April 11: Treaty of Saint Petersburg (1805), Russia joins the alliance
  - Hanover Expedition - alliance occupation of the Electorate of Hanover
  - October 30: Battle of Mehrnbach
  - October 31: Battle of Lambach
  - November 3: Treaty of Potsdam (1805), Prussia to join alliance if negotiations with France failed
  - November 5: Battle of Amstetten
  - November 11: Battle of Dürenstein
  - November 16: Battle of Schöngrabern
  - November 28: Battle of Wischau
  - December 2: Battle of Austerlitz
- Russo-Tlingit War (1802-1805)
  - Tlingit destroy New Russia (trading post)
- Moscow Society of Naturalists founded
- Kharkov National Medical University founded
- Alexander Garden (Saint Petersburg) designed
- Evangelical Lutheran Church of Saint Mary (Saint Petersburg) built
- Second Saint Petersburg Gymnasium founded
- Yakutsk Oblast established

== Births ==
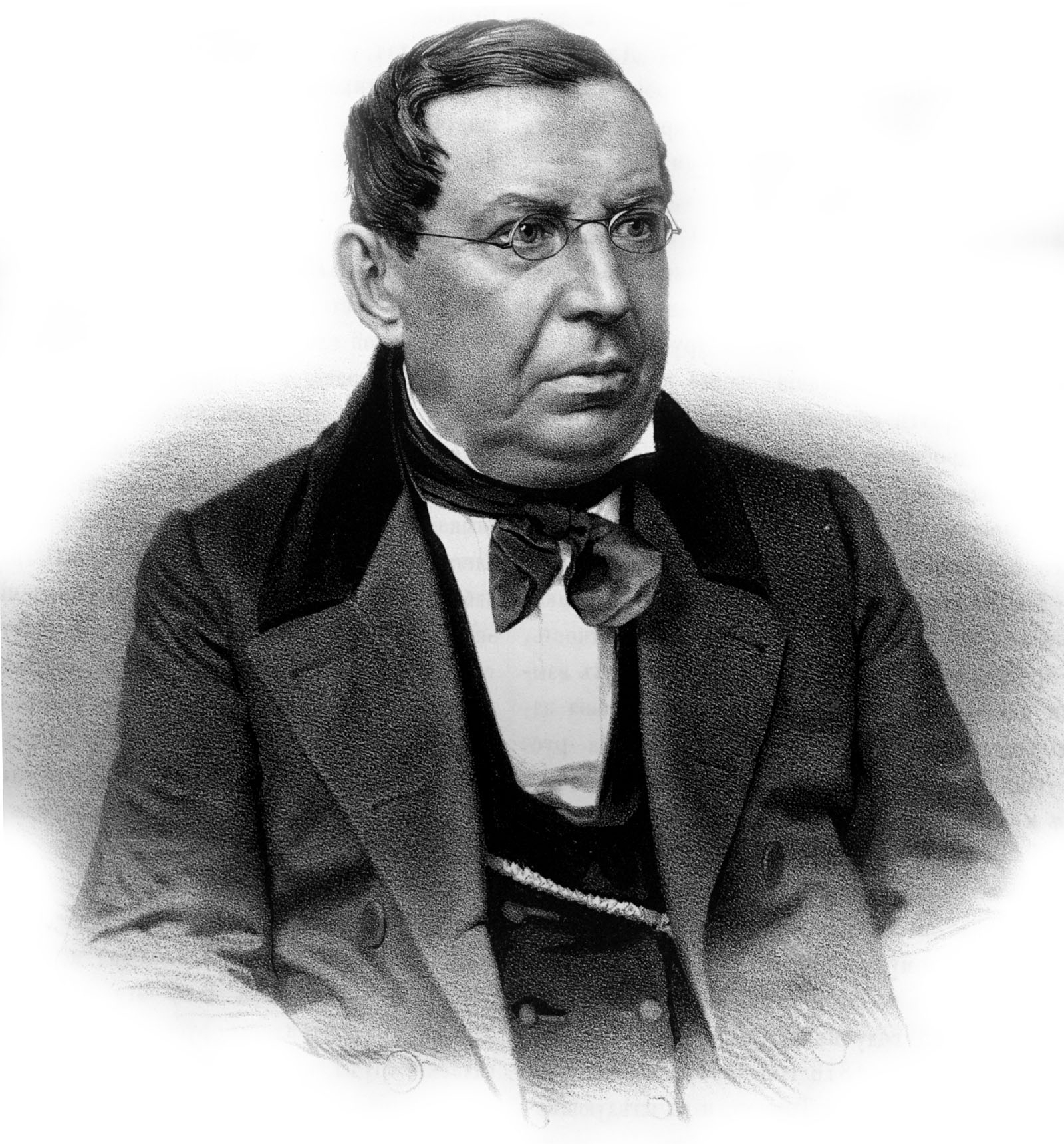
Nikolay G. Ustryalov

- Modest Ivanovich Bogdanovich, general and military historian (d. 1882)
- Nikanor Chernetsov, landscape painter (d. 1879)
- Solomon Dodashvili, Georgian writer and educator (d. 1836)
- Philaret Gumilevsky, Orthodox archbishop and church historian (d. 1866)
- Aleksandra Ishimova, translator and children's author (d. 1881)
- Pyotr Karatygin, actor, playwright, and writer (d. 1879)
- Andreas Roller, German born painter and set designer (d. 1891)
- Nikolay Ustryalov, historian (d. 1870)
- Illarion Vasilchikov, general (d. 1862)
- Dmitry Venevitinov, poet (d. 1827)
- Mariya Volkonskaya, wife of Decembrist Prince Sergey Volkonsky (d. 1863)
- Peter Clodt von Jürgensburg, sculptor (d. 1867)
- Vasily Zhivokini, comic actor (d. 1874)
- Maria Zhukova, writer (d. 1855)

== Deaths ==
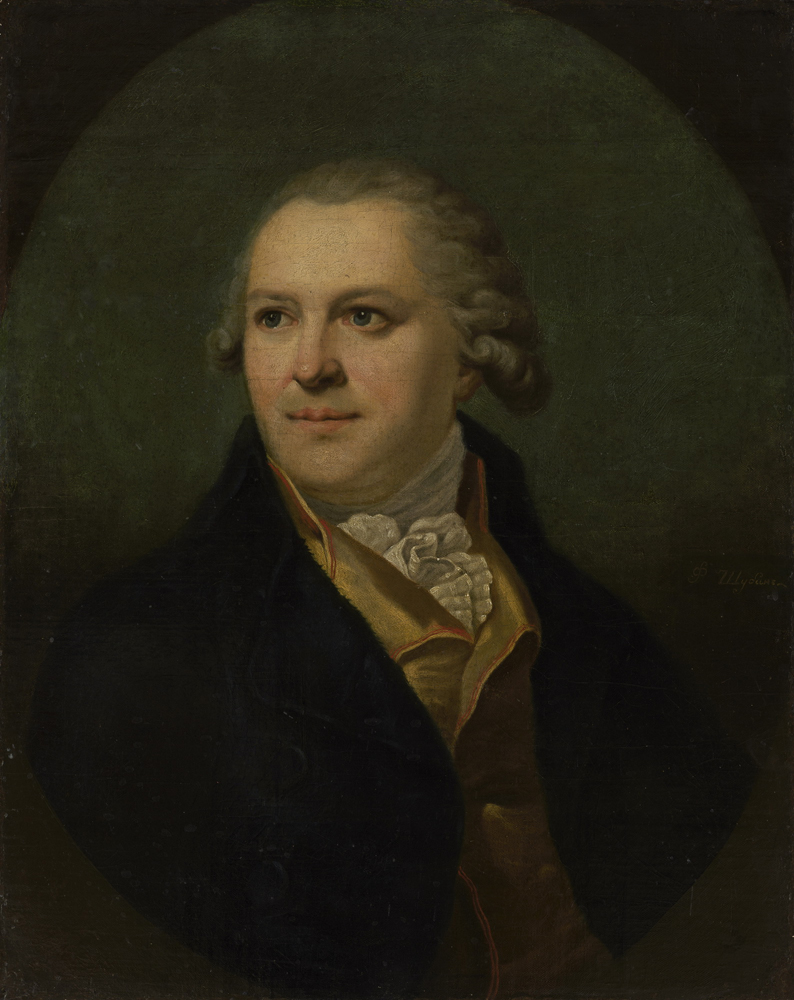
Fedot Shubin (self-portrait) c. 1794

- Pyotr Drozhdin, painter (b. 1745)
- Jacob Stepanovich Esipov, investor and businessman (b. ?)
- Anna Lopukhina, mistress of Paul I of Russia (b. 1777)
- Apollo Mussin-Pushkin, chemist and plant collector (b. 1760)
- Ivan Pnin, poet and political writer (b. 1773)
- Ivan Saltykov, field marshal, governor-general of Moscow (b. 1730)
- Fedot Shubin, sculptor (b. 1740)
- Ferdinand von Tiesenhausen, noble, aide-de-camp to Alexander I (b. 1782)
- Alexander Vorontsov, diplomat and Chancellor (b. 1741)
- Nikolay Alexandrovich Zubov, soldier, courtier, regicide (b. 1763)
