= Sugar factory =

Sugar factory may refer to:

== Industry ==
- Beet sugar factory, a factory that produces raw sugar from sugar beet and refines it
- Sugarcane mill, a factory that produces raw sugar from sugar cane and refines it
- Sugar refinery, a factory that produces white sugar from raw sugar
- Sugar Factory, Antigua and Barbuda, a large village

== Music and film ==
- Sugar Factory (film), 2023
- The Sugar Factory (film), 1999
- The Sugar Factory (album), by Fred Frith and Evelyn Glennie, 2007

== See also ==
- Sugar Factory Zeeland, in the Netherlands
