= Sugar Factory Zeeland =

Defunct Dutch sugar factory

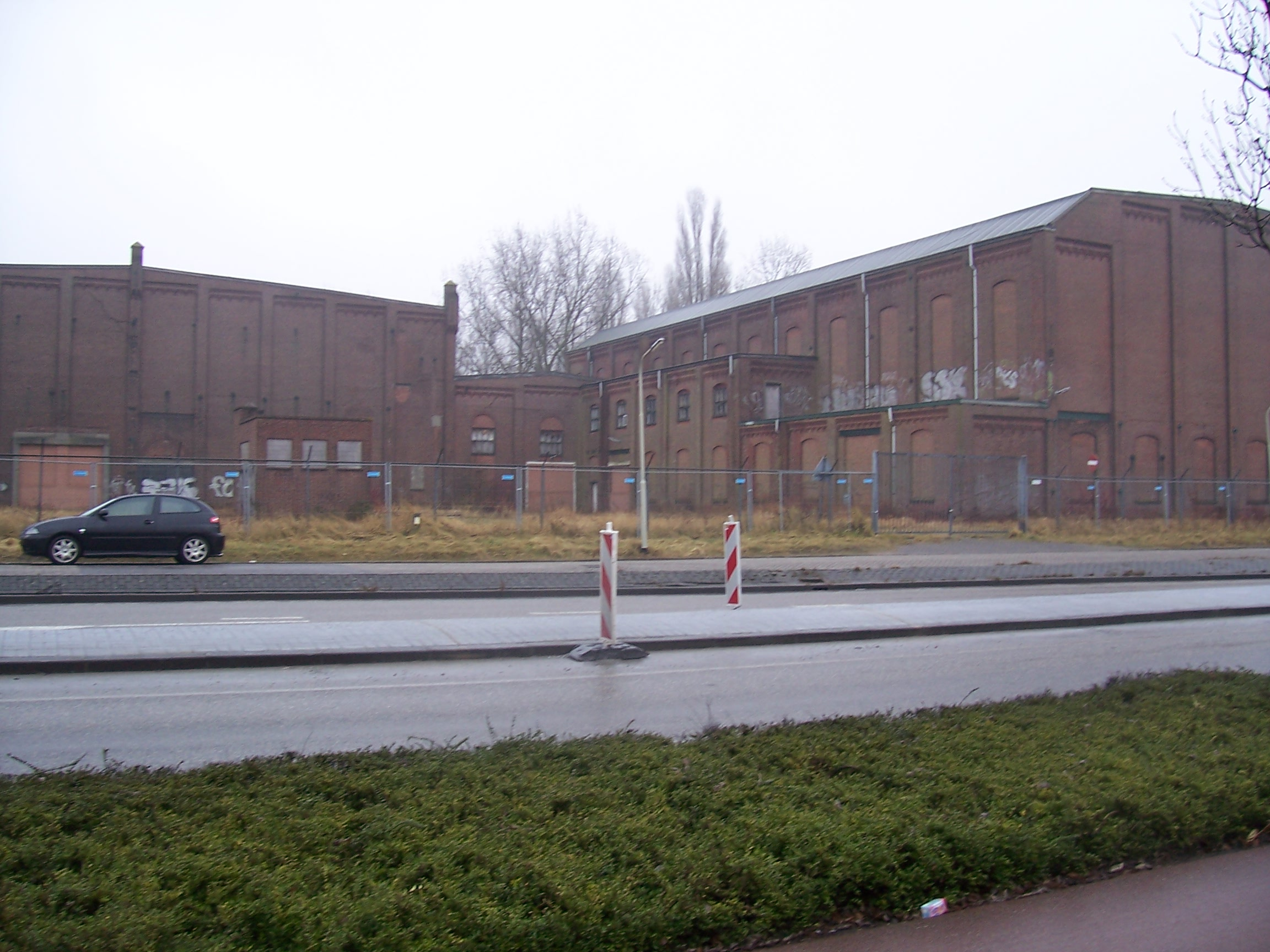
- Zeeland before the 2012 reconstruction

- Location within North Brabant
- Built: October 1863
- Operated: 1863-1929
- Location: Havenkwartier, Bergen op Zoom
- Coordinates: 51°29′33.38″N 4°16′32.67″E
- Owner: Gebri International B.V.

Sugar Factory Zeeland was a beet sugar factory in Bergen op Zoom, a city and municipality in the North Brabant province in the Southwestern Netherlands. It got its peculiar name when it was sold to the Coöperatieve Beetwortelsuikerfabriek Zeeland, a cooperative of sugar beet farmers from neighboring Zeeland province. The factory was in operation from 1863 to 1929. Some of the imposing factory buildings remain and are protected as industrial heritage. In 2012 a reconstruction started to change the old buildings to a large shopping mall called De Zeeland.

== Sugar factory of F.G Wittouck (1863) ==
By 1863 the Wittouck family owned a number of sugar factories in Belgium. Félix-Guillaume Wittouck (1812-1898) also wanted to establish a beet sugar factory in the Netherlands. In late December 1862, the municipality of Goes declined his request from June that year, to get a lease on city terrains as a location for a sugar factory. The grounds to refuse this focused on the scarcity of fresh water in the area. It might very well be that this very late decision on Wittouck's request had become irrelevant by then.

On 22 December 1862 Wittouck gave orders to lay the foundations for a sugar factory in Bergen op Zoom. This would be done by Van der Made from Klundert for 15,460 guilders. Wittouck had already bought the machinery at Cail Allaur & Co. On 9 March 1863 J. van den Heuvel from Tilburg won the order to further construct the sugar factory on the south side of the harbor for 32,049 guilders. Wittouck was described as a notable industrialist and owner of such a factory in Sint-Pieters-Leeuw, Belgium. The factory opened in October 1863.

At first, the sugar factory might have been known as the one in Bergen op Zoom. However, in 1870 the partnership Laane, Rogier, Daverveldt & Co was formed to found another sugar factory in Bergen op Zoom. In January 1871 'Van der Linden & Co.' gave orders to construct the final parts of a third sugar factory in Bergen op Zoom, located near the big arsenal. In 1871 the Sugar Factory Zeeland was referred to as 'Fabriek Wittouck'. Other designations were: 'Fabriek van de heer Wittouck', 'Beetwortelsuikerfabriek van de heer F. Wittouck' etc.

== Paul Wittouck (1881) ==
In 1872 a sugar factory had been built in Princenhage (near Breda). Its two first campaigns were disastrous. In 1874 Félix-Guillaume Wittouck acquired this sugar factory for 174,000 guilders. In 1881 he gifted it to his son Paul Wittouck (1851-1917), but this might have referred to the management only. In 1882 Paul Wittouck was indeed mentioned as director of the Breda sugar factory. Meanwhile, the sugar factory in Bergen op Zoom continued to be referred to as the sugar factory of Mr. Wittouck.

The arrival of Paul Wittouck in Breda signaled a slow transfer of authority to him. In May 1883 our sugar factory in Bergen op Zoom was suddenly referred to as that of 'Messrs. Wittouck'. In January 1884 there was talk of the sugar factory of Paul Wittouck in Breda and Bergen op Zoom. The successes of Paul Wittouck would come from two ideas: refining and economies of scale. While the numerous competitors focused on producing raw sugar, Paul was one of the first Dutch beet sugar producers to think about refining his own sugar. However, it would be 1903 before his Breda factory became the first Dutch factory to produce white sugar directly from beet.

Paul Wittouck invested heavily in modernizing the sugar factory in Bergen op Zoom. In 1884 the factory of 'F. Wittouck' got new machines. Amongst these, a conveyor belt for unloading boats. This alone saved half of the staff during the campaign. Also in September 1884, the factory of 'Messrs. Wittouck' started to work with electric lighting. Most transport to and from the factory was over water. However, in July 1885 the factory of Paul Wittouck got permission to build a railroad from the station to the new harbor.

In January 1887 the foundation of the 'Sucreries de Breda et Berg-op-Zoom' was announced. Its statutory seat was in Ixelles near Brussels, but its administrative seat was in Breda. It led to the sugar factories of Breda and Bergen op Zoom being part of the same company. The company was also known as Sucrerie Wittouck.

In 1894 the company expanded its factories. Breda would get a capacity to process 1,000 tonnes a day, Bergen op Zoom would get a capacity of 600 tonnes a day. The main problem of the company was the challenge of getting enough beet at a price low enough to make a good profit. In 1897 Paul Wittouck attempted to enforce this by founding the Nederlandsche Maatschappij van Beetwortelsuiker Industrie, in which 19 producers participated. It led to this society founding the Zuid Nederlandsche Melasse Spiritusfabriek N.V. This was a factory for Denatured alcohol spiritus which would re-use the buildings of Wittouck's Maltose factory in Bergen op Zoom. Denatured alcohol was made out of beet molasses.

In May 1903 Wittouck bought the sugar factory 'De Twaalf Apostelen' of competitor Laane, Rogier, Daverveldt & Co.

== Suikerfabrieken van Breda en Bergen op Zoom and ASMij ==
In September 1905 the public company Suikerfabrieken van Breda en Bergen op Zoom N.V. was founded. It started with a share capital of 2,000 preference shares of 400 guilders each. 1,950 of these were paid for by transferring the two sugar factories of the Belgian public company. The three executive managers were P. Wittouck from Brussels, F. Wittouck from Ixelles, and R. Wittouck from Breda.

In 1908 the Suikerfabrieken van Breda en Bergen op Zoom merged with Sugar factory de Mark in Oudenbosch to form the Algemeene Suiker Maatschappij (ASMij).

== Coöperatieve Beetwortelsuikerfabriek Zeeland ==
In September 1913 the Coöperatieve Beetwortelsuikerfabriek Zeeland (Cooperative Beetsugar Factory Zeeland) was founded in Middelburg. The idea was that it would give Zeeland farmers a better price for their sugar beet. However, it struggled to set up a business, because the price for a new factory was high. The cooperative got an opportunity, when during World War I, the government put a maximum on the amount of beets that each sugar factory was allowed to process. In August 1916 the cooperative bought the Bergen op Zoom factory for 1,160,000 guilders. It made a 5-year contract with the Wester Suikerraffinaderij to process the raw sugar that it would produce.

Sugar Factory Zeeland started its first campaign on 9 October 1917. As sugar prices rose, the company became very profitable. It therefore decided to invest in a massive expansion. In 1920 a 34 hectare stretch of land was bought in the Geertruida polder. This was on the Oosterschelde, west of the city center on what is now the Markiezaatsweg. In 1921 the company decided to borrow 700,000 guilders for further investments.

In 1920-1921 an annex to the factory was built for the first steps of the sugar production process. It had open air storage areas which declined towards gutters, so called gorren. Cranes unloaded the boats directly onto these gorren, from where the beet were washed to the first factory hall. The same applied to beet brought by rail or wagon. This eliminated almost all manual labor in this step. The first of three new halls served for the washing, slicing and diffusion steps of the process. A smaller hall between the first and the third contained the engine room and a storage for pulp. The third hall contained centrifuges to dry the pulp, which became cattle fodder. It also contained machinery to clear the juice. The end product of this part of the factory was thin juice, which was transported to the old factory on the Wittoucksingel by a large pipe. The evaporators, pans and centrifuges of the later stages of the process remained in the old factory. All this made that the new complex resembled a râperie.

At the same time the factory invested 250,000-300,000 guilders in a new harbor to facilitate the flow of resources and products. This later became known as the Zeeland Harbor. It was filled up in 1971. The new factory complex was taken into use on 3 October 1921.

The new large Sugar Factory Zeeland would not be successful. From 1923 onwards the sugar industry went downhill. The economy was plagued by protectionism and overproduction, and wages were ever increasing. To make matters worse, a lot of cheap raw cane sugar was imported from Java.

The annual report over 1924 was nevertheless quite positive. The campaign of that year had processed 166,000 tonnes of beet. Attempts were made to get part of the Zeeland production refined in Dinteloord. In the 1925 campaign 160,000 tonnes were processed. About one-third of the production was white sugar, thanks to an investment in refining equipment. The low market prices made that the financial result was not satisfactory. In 1926-27 180,000 tonnes were processed. Almost half of the sugar production was white sugar, but profit was marginal. In 1927-1928 the company processed only 143,000 tonnes, which had a negative effect on profit. In 1928/29 155,000 tonnes of beet were processed.

The price the company paid for beet in 1928 was lower than what other cooperatives paid. In March 1929 the Zeeland cooperative therefore decided that the beets which it had promised to buy for the 1929/30 campaign would be processed in Dinteloord and Zevenbergen. The price would be 3 guilders higher than that which Dinteloord paid her own members, thus compensating the members of the Zeeland cooperative for the cost of not using their factory. The attempt to coordinate with Dinteloord and Zevenbergen nevertheless failed. In September 1929 the cooperative therefore appointed a commission that would have to sell the sugar factory.

On 17 March 1930 the cooperative decided to sell the factory and other assets to the Centrale Suiker Maatschappij, the partnership in Dinteloord, and the cooperative in Puttershoek, for 750,000 guilders. The members of the Zeeland Cooperative would have to deposit 300 guilders per share for the liquidation. They could diminish this by contracting to deliver to the buyers in the future. The short explanation for the required deposit is that the cooperative was in debt for a few million, mainly invested in buildings and machinery. These debts now had to be repaid, and 750,000 guilders fell far short of this amount.

== Buildings ==
In 1930 the new Instituut voor Suikerbietenteelt, later Instituut voor Rationele Suikerproductie (IRS) settled in the former laboratories and offices of the factory. The former chief executive of the factory became its director. In 1952 the institute moved to the former sugar warehouse. A hall, the refinery, the boiler house, and the chimney on the south side of the harbor were demolished. The other buildings of the old factory were later repurposed.

The three big halls of the 'new' factory on the Markiezaatsweg were finally bought by the Ministry of Defense. They were used for several goals, including storage of ammunition. This in effect saved these halls. In the 1990s the army moved out. Several plans were made till the municipality of Bergen op Zoom became actively involved in 2009. It declared the halls a municipal monument, hoping to get provincial funding.

== 'De Zeeland' ==
In 2012 the three halls were renovated and a covered shopping mall was constructed inside the halls. In May 2014 the renovation was completed. The shopping center 'De Zeeland' has three floors with room for a dozen shops. Plans were made to extend the shopping center in the direction of the local 'furniture mall' meubel boulevard. A new cinema was created just south of the complex. In 2017 some specialist food companies were established in the center.

The name 'De Zeeland' is consistent with names like 'De Wittouck' for the sugar factory in Breda (Princenhage), or 'De Wester' for the Wester Suikerraffinaderij.
