= Wester Suikerraffinaderij =

Sugar refinery in Netherlands

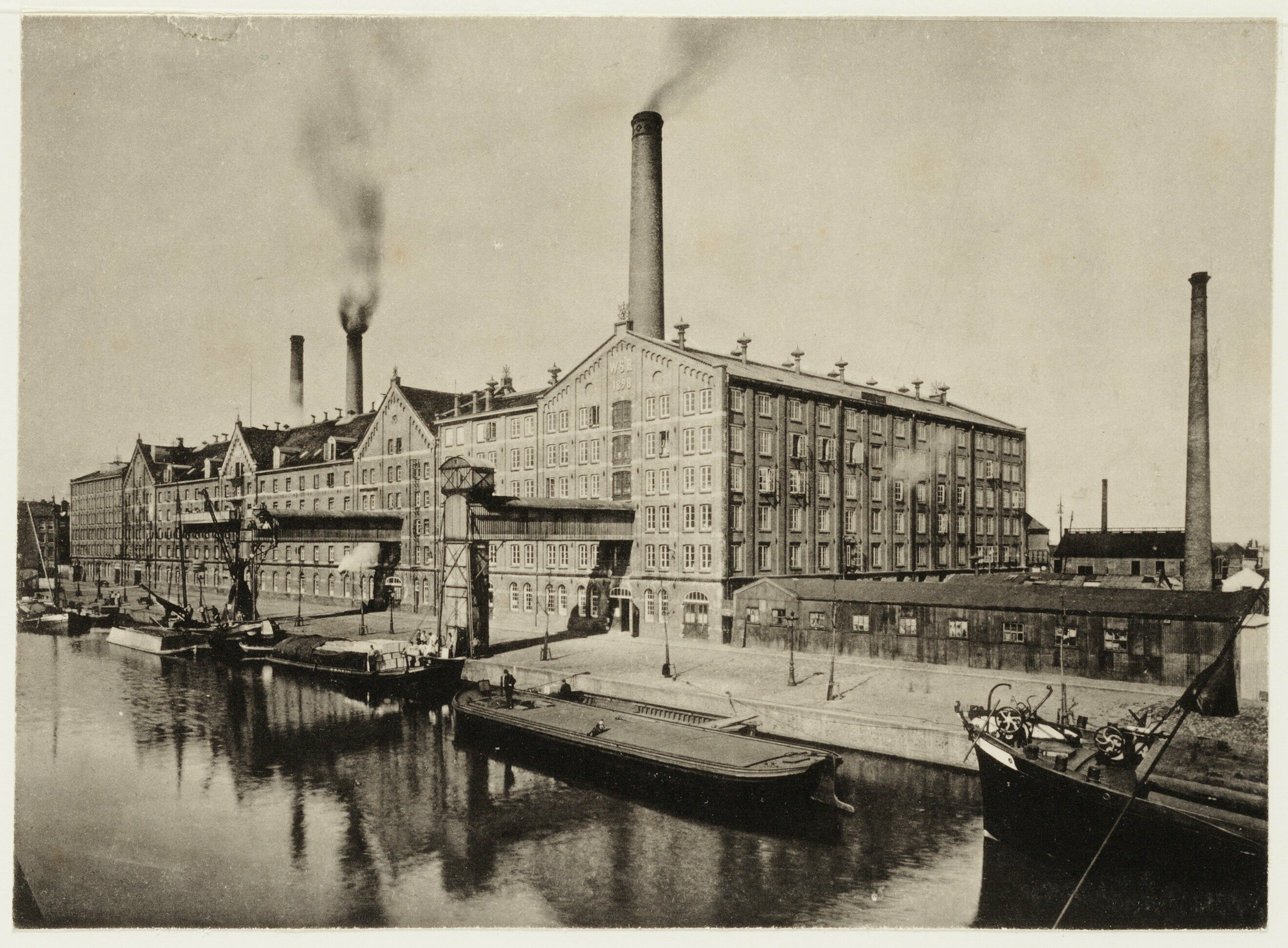
- The Wester Suikerraffinaderij on the Van Noordtkade in Amsterdam
- Industry: Sugar refining
- Founded: 1882
- Defunct: 1965 (the factory)
- Fate: 1919 company merged into Centrale Suiker Maatschappij
- Headquarters: Amsterdam, Netherlands
- Products: White sugar

The Wester Suikerraffinaderij or Wester Sugar Refinery, was a major sugar refinery in Amsterdam founded by the company Wester Suiker-Raffinaderij N.V. The sugar refinery became part of the Centrale Suiker Maatschappij (CSM) in 1919 and was closed down in 1965. The public company Wester Suikerraffinaderij N.V., which held shares in CSM, survived into the 1990s.

== History ==
=== Foundation of Wester Suiker-Raffinaderij N.V. ===
The Wester Suikerraffinaderij was founded in the long tradition of Amsterdam as a world center for refining sugar. The plans were finalized in March 1882. They put an end to plans for founding a new factory on the grounds of the Internationale Suikerraffinaderij. Instead, the founders opted for a location on a terrain that they bought from the municipality at about the same time.

In March 1882 the contract for founding the company N.V. Wester Suiker-Raffinaderij was signed. The share capital was to be 800,000 guilders in 1,000 guilder shares. The first directors were L.E. Löwenstam and M.C.P. Barbe. The supervisory board consisted of D. Cordes, B. van Marwijk Kooy, S. de Clercq Willemszoon, and M.C. van Hall.

=== In business ===
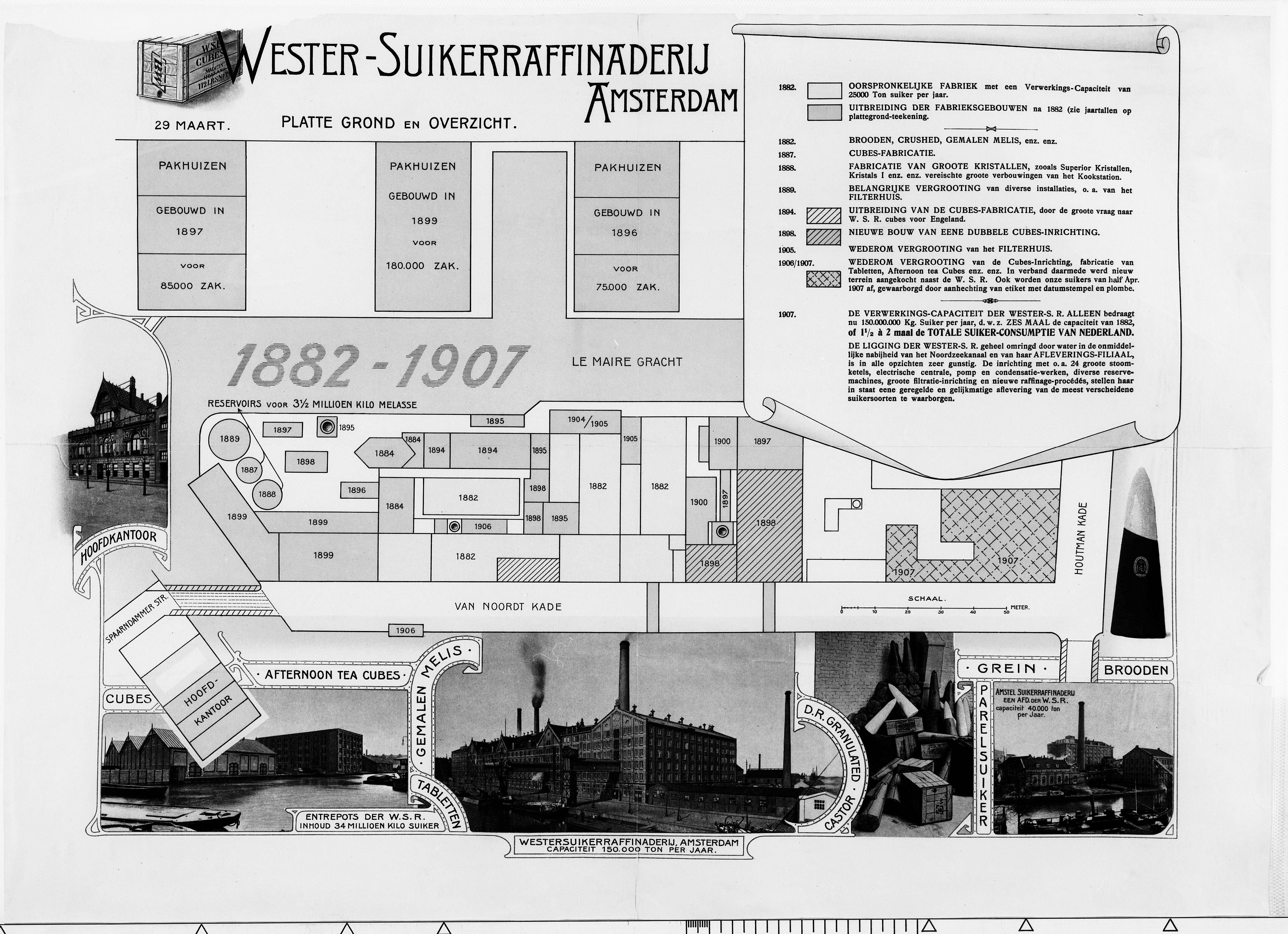
1907 floor plan with production data

The Wester Suikerraffinaderij initially processed only raw sugar from sugar cane. This was raw sugar from Java, which was processed to create about 60 different sugar products. The first beet sugar factory in the Netherlands had been founded in 1858. When the beet sugar industry in the Netherlands grew, the Wester Suikerraffinaderij also started to refine raw sugar from sugar beet.

As the share capital suggests, the new refinery on the Van Noordtkade 20 initially could not have been much bigger than older steam driven sugar refineries in Amsterdam. However, the Wester sugar refinery would quickly grow to a much larger scale than previous sugar refineries. The original processing capacity was 25,000 tonnes per year. In 1907 this had grown to 150,000 tonnes a year. This was between 1.5 and the two times the total Dutch sugar consumption, see the 1907 floor plan. No wonder that the Wester Suikerraffinaderij was very dependent on export.

=== Backward integration (1915-1919) ===
After 1900 some sugar factories started to themselves refine their raw sugar. In 1908 the success of the cooperative beet sugar factories led to the foundation of the Algemeene Suiker Maatschappij (ASMij). This was a merger of the sugar factories: Paul Wittouck in Bergen op Zoom; De Mark in Oudenbosch; and the one in Breda. In 1910 the Wester than announced that it wanted to have its own sugar factories (backward integration). The reasons were that several sugar factories had started to deliver a kind of white sugar competing with Wester's products. This also led to a decrease in raw sugar available for the Wester.

In 1910, Wester's management proposed to change the articles of association of the company, so it could also produce raw beet sugar. In September 1910, it issued bonds for 1,000,000 guilders. Negotiations with beet sugar companies then led to them limiting their white sugar production and delivering more raw sugar to Wester. In 1913-14 Wester acquired the majority of shares in the Standaardbuiten sugar factory. It also bought the Lemelerveld sugar factory. By 1915 the Wester acquired 'interests in raw sugar' for about 1,000,000 guilders. These were later revealed to have referred to the factories of the Algemeene Suiker Maatschappij and the Gastelsche Beetwortelsuikerfabriek.

In 1919 an even larger concentration followed. This time, the Wester, Hollandia dairy company, and the partnership Van Loon, De Ram & Co. founded a new company called Centrale Suiker Maatschappij (CSM), with a share capital of 30,000,000 guilders. Hollandia had a sugar refinery in Vlaardingen and a sugar factory in Gorinchem. Van Loon, De Ram & Co. had a sugar factory in Steenbergen.

The three founding companies of CSM paid for their shares by bringing in their assets. Thus, the refinery Wester Suikerraffinaderij and her sister factories became owned by CSM. At first, the public company N.V. Wester Suikerraffinaderij became the majority shareholder in CSM, holding 6,600 of the 12,000 regular shares. Subsequent emissions then soon diminished N.V. Wester Suikerraffinaderij's part to that of a very large shareholder.

== History of the refinery as part of CSM ==
In 1920, the Centrale Suiker Maatschappij (CSM) was the fourth biggest company of the Netherlands. Almost from the start, CSM got in trouble. In 1919 the limits on cultivating sugar beet where lifted, and prices began to fall. A development that was especially dangerous to the refinery was that the United Kingdom started to protect and subsidize its own sugar beet industry. In the end the government determined started to regulate the sugar market, with every factory company buying a pre-determined part of the sugar beet. For CSM this was 40%.

By 1935 the Wester Suikerrafinaderij was the only sugar refinery of CSM. After World War II CSM achieved record production figures for sugar from beet. Wester remained its Black sheep. It focused on export, but after profiting from the high sugar prices in the years after the war it got into trouble when these fell rapidly after 1951. The factory was outdated, and located in the center of Amsterdam, where wages were highest.

The beginning of the end came when in September 1960, the government stopped to repay Wester for the import tariff that was levied on raw cane sugar. By 1962 refining raw cane sugar was no longer profitable at the Wester, and in September of that year 200 employees were fired. In 1963 the Wester Suikerraffinaderij reported a dramatic operational loss of 5.6 million guilders. On 1 November 1965 the last 250 employees of what had once been 1,200 were fired. Critics noted that this was a matter of agricultural policy, because the same government that refused to support the refinery had in some years spent up to 225 million on supporting the sugar beet industry.

== Legacy ==
At the site of the refinery, apartment complexes were built. A square was named Suikerplein (Sugar Square) to commemorate the Wester sugar refinery. In 1994 a monument on the by Jocke Overwater was placed. It symbolizes the gate of the refinery.

The name "Wester" continues as a trade mark for sugar products (Wester Kristalsuiker, Westerstroop, Wester Rietsuiker). The Wester Harmonie was founded as a company band on 4 June 1904 and still exists.
