= Maurits van Hall =

Dutch lawyer, private banker and politician (1836–1900)

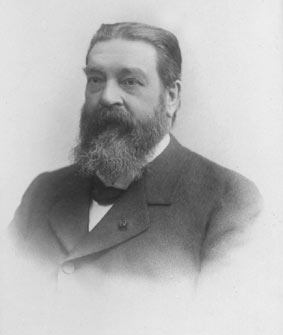

Member of the Senate
- In office 13 April 1896 – 18 December 1900
- Preceded by: Jan Prins
- Succeeded by: Johannes Tak van Poortvliet
- Constituency: North Holland

Member of the Provincial Council of North Holland
- In office 4 July 1883 – 12 April 1896
- Constituency: Amsterdam

Personal details
- Born: Maurits Cornelis van Hall; 31 January 1836 Amsterdam, Netherlands
- Died: 18 December 1900 (aged 64) Amsterdam, Netherlands
- Spouse: Debora Cremer Eindhoven (m. 1864)
- Children: 9
- Relatives: Maurits van Hall Sr. (grandfather); Floris Adriaan van Hall (uncle); Gijs van Hall (grandson)
- Occupation: Banker; lawyer; politician

Maurits Cornelis van Hall (Dutch: [ˈmʌurɪts fɑn ˈɦɑl]; 31 January 1836 – 18 December 1900) was a Dutch lawyer, banker and, politician. Born into a wealthy family, he was active as a lawyer in Amsterdam before being a minor participant in the founding of the Dutch Credit and Deposit Bank, a precursor of BNP Paribas, in 1863. He headed its Amsterdam office after a merger with a French bank, and he sat on the boards of directors and supervisory boards of several organisations. A liberal, Van Hall was a member of the Provincial Council of North Holland between 1883 and 1896 and the Senate between 1896 and 1900, when he died.

== Early life and education ==
Van Hall was born on 31 January 1836 in Amsterdam into a family of regenten, as the son of lawyer Anne Maurits van Hall and Suze van Schermbeek. He had a younger sister called Johanna and a younger brother called Floris. His father joined the 1834 Dutch Reformed Church split, bringing him into conflict with his family and the ruling elite. His father died of tuberculosis in 1838, and his mother took the children to her hometown of Utrecht. They lived on the Weerdsingel. Van Hall's mother died in 1844, also of tuberculosis, and the children were subsequently under care of their godparents: their grandfather, Maurits, who was a lawyer, poet, and politician, and their uncle, Floris, who was a minister and chairman of the Council of Ministers. Van Hall was raised with his siblings by his aunt in Utrecht.

Between 1853 and 1858, he studied Roman and contemporary law in Utrecht.

== Business career ==
He became a lawyer in Amsterdam after his studies, and he mostly represented industrial, financial, and cultural enterprises from the Dutch East and West Indies. When the Dutch Credit and Deposit Bank, a precursor of BNP Paribas, was established in April 1863, Van Hall was a minor participant with 50 shares of ƒ250. He became its secretary, and the bank merged in 1872 to become the Banque de Paris et des Pays-Bas. Van Hall headed its Amsterdam office, located on the Herengracht, until at least 1899.

He held several secondary positions, such as state commissioner of the Entrepotdok starting in 1884 and heemraad of Rijnenburger Grift around 1889. He joined the boards of directors of the Amsterdam Stock Exchange Association in 1876 and The Hague Tramway Company in 1887, each in its founding year. Van Hall was a member of the governing board of the Bischofsheim Association and of the boards of directors of the Paleis voor Volksvlijt, the Society for the Public Benefit, and the Company for the Drainage and Exploitation of the Tienhoven and Maarsseveen Lakes. He had been an investor in the latter company when it was established in 1870. He sat on the supervisory boards of the Zeeland Steamship Company, the Wester Suikerraffinaderij, the Netherlands Bell Telephone Company, and the Dutch Mutual Fire Guarantee Company, and he was among four investors in the Dutch Insurance Company Against the Risk of Mutual Guarantee.

After the Amsterdam Stadsschouwburg burnt down in 1890, Van Hall was part of a group that offered to establish a company that would build a new city theatre. It would have a capital of ƒ100,000 and issue ƒ900,000 in bonds.

== Politics ==
Van Hall was associated with liberalism, in contrast to his more moderate grandfather Maurits and uncle Floris. Nominated by the association Burgerpligt, he was a member of the Amsterdam chamber of commerce between 1883 and 1890, including as vice president from 1885 onward. He was sworn into the Provincial Council of North Holland on 4 July 1883 following his election in the Amsterdam electoral district. Van Hall secured another term in May 1889, and he served on the council until 12 April 1896.

Van Hall was a candidate to replace Menso Pijnappel in the Senate in May 1894, but he was defeated by Gijsbert van Tienhoven in a second round of voting. In February 1896, following the death of Jan Prins, he was elected to the Senate for North Holland, and he took his seat on 13 April. Van Hall was re-elected in July 1899, and he was chairperson of the petitions committee. While in the Senate, he had throat cancer, and he could only breathe through a silver tube in his trachea. He never spoke on the Senate floor, despite attending all debates. Van Hall died in office.

== Personal life ==
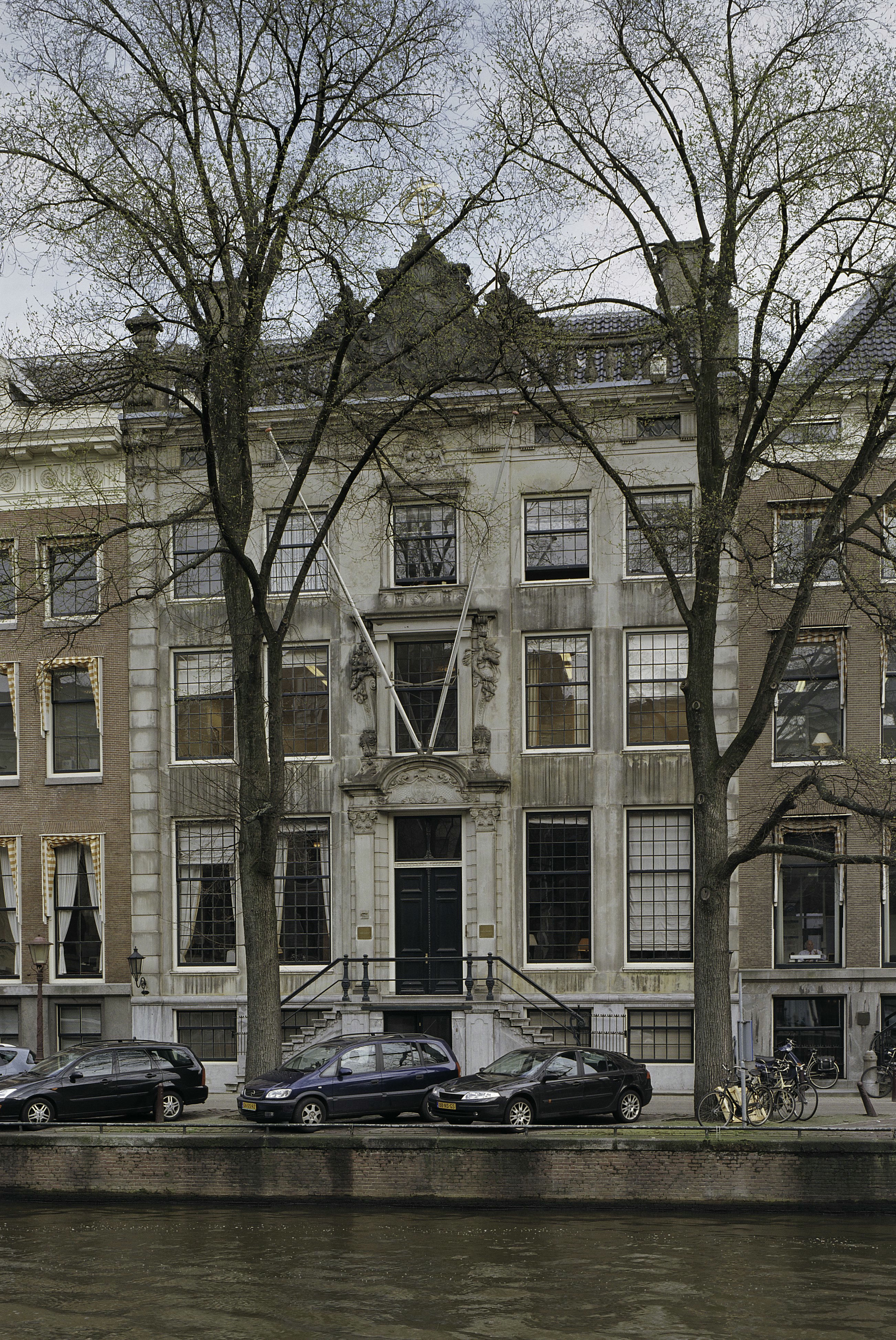
Van Hall's home at Herengracht 475

He was a member of the Dutch Reformed Church, and he married Debora Cremer Eindhoven (1843–1906), who originated from the north of the Netherlands, on 2 August 1864 in Zwolle. They had nine children and lived in the Gouden Bocht in Amsterdam at Herengracht 475. His grandchildren include politician, banker, and resistance member Gijs van Hall.

Van Hall was a member of the Amsterdam schutterij, serving as second lieutenant from April 1862, as first lieutenant from November 1864, and as captain from July 1866. He was appointed a Knight of the Order of the Gold Lion of the House of Nassau in 1882 and a Knight of the Order of the Netherlands Lion in 1899.

He died in Amsterdam on 18 December 1900, aged 64, and he was buried at Westerveld cemetery.
