= Battle of Lambach =

1805 battle during the War of the Third Coalition

- Part of the War of the Third Coalition
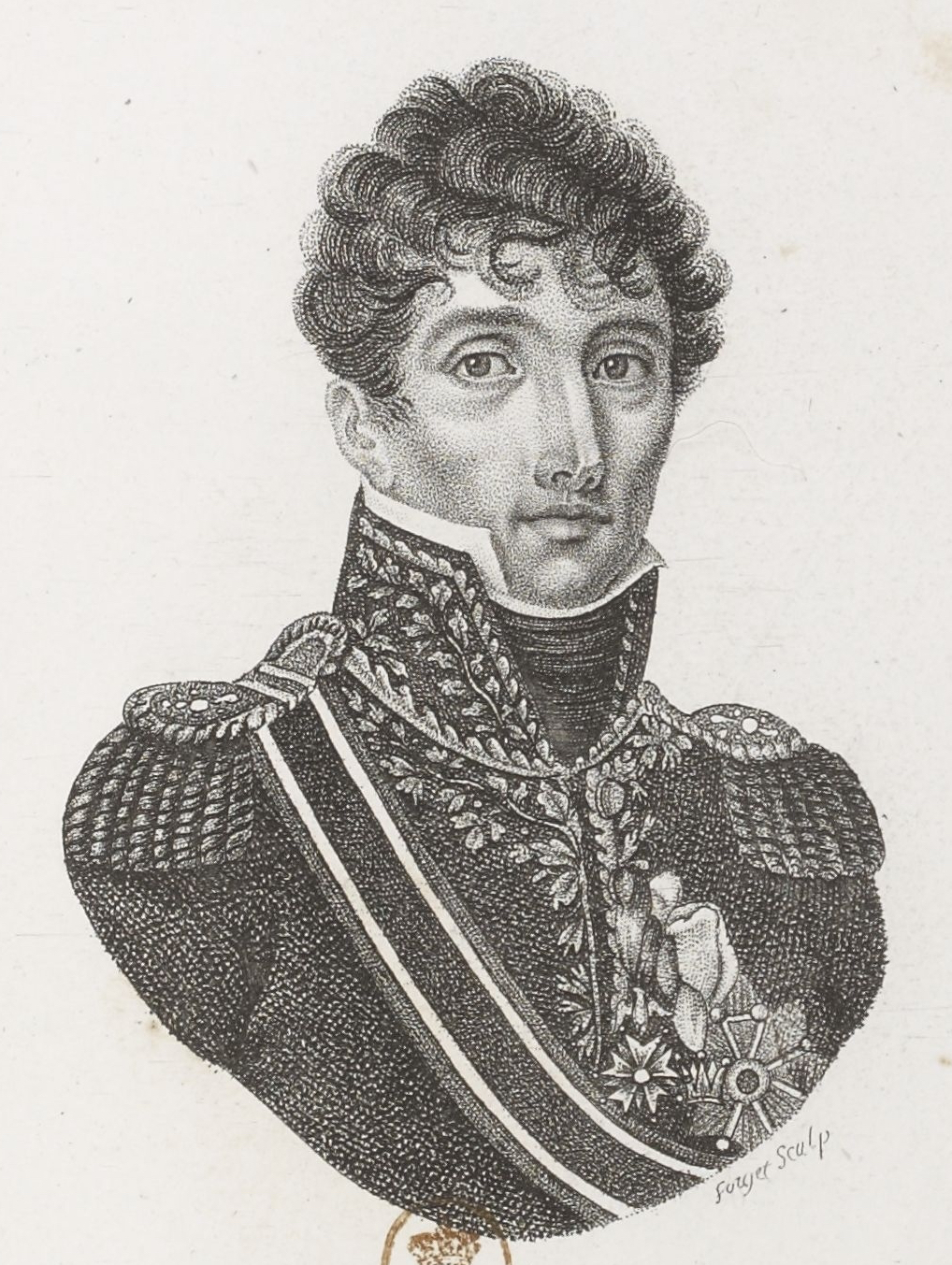
- Marc-Antoine de Beaumont
Date	31 October 1805
Location	Lambach, Oberösterreich, Austrian Empire 48.0908°N 13.8774°E
Result	French victory

Belligerents
First French Empire	Russian Empire; Austrian Empire

Commanders and leaders
Louis-Nicolas Davout; Marc Antoine de Beaumont	Pyotr Bagration; Emanuel Schustekh

Strength
Unknown	3,700 men 12 guns

Casualties and losses
50 killed or wounded	148 killed or wounded 1 cannon lost 400 killed or wounded

War of the Third Coalition:
Austria
current battle
Napoleon in command
Napoleon not in command

The Battle of Lambach (Russian: Бой при Ламбахе, French: Bataille de Lambach, German: Gefecht bei Lambach) was a minor French victory where the French vanguard won against an Austro-Russian force under Pjotr Bagration (Russia) and Emanuel Freiherr Schustekh (Austria) on 31 October 1805 at Lambach in Oberösterreich, today Austria, during the Napoleonic Wars.

== Background ==
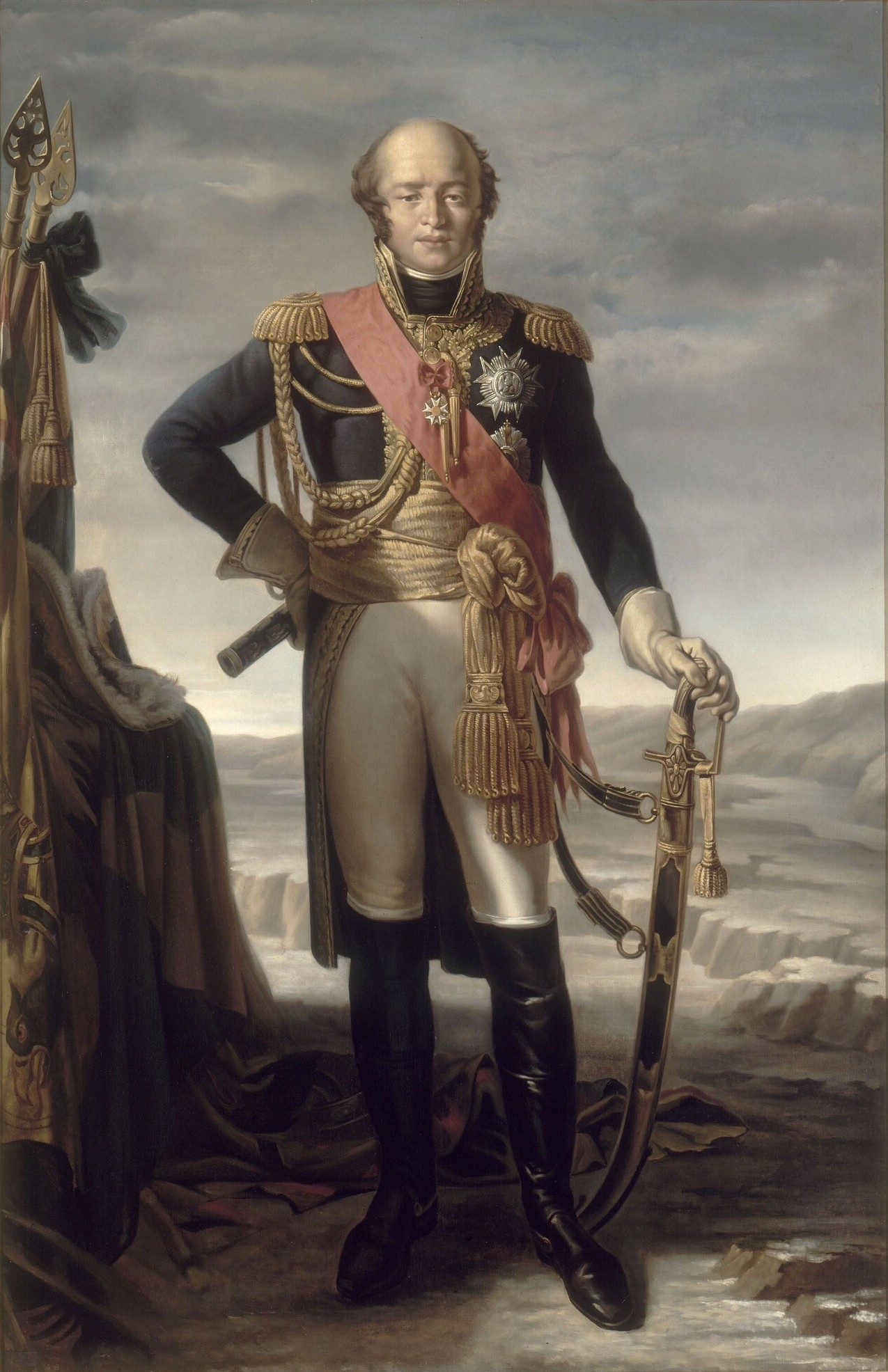
Marshal Louis Nicolas Davout commanded the French troops during the battle of Lambach.

After surrounding and defeating an Austrian army at Ulm in October 1805, Napoleon's army, supported by the Bavarian Army, marched to the east. On 30 October (or 31, depending on how you look at the campaign), Beaumont's vanguard engaged and defeated a minor Austrian force in the battle of Mehrnbach (also called battle of Ried).

== Battle ==
Not long after, Beaumont reached the fortified Russian positions. None of the opposing sides actually wanted to fight (the Russians had 4 jäger battalions, some hussars, and a few horse artillery cannons, while the French had 3 cavalry regiments and 2 infantry regiments). Therefore, this part of the battle was limited to a small fight and firefight over a village near the Russian positions.

The Austrians, under Major General Schustekh, wanted to cross the Traun river and unite with the main army under Kutusov. His rearguard was pushed back by the French, and soon the fighting came to the bridge over the river. Though the Austrians set fire on it, the French crossed the river by boat a while later.

At Lambach the French lost around 50 men, the Russians 148 men and 1 cannon. The Austrians lost around 400 men.

== Aftermath ==
The battle of Lambach was a part of several Austrian and Russian attempts to slow down the French advance, to give Kutusov's army time to retreat. Though these battles were mostly defeats, they gave time to Kutusov's army, so they could retreat. On 13 November French troops entered Vienna without a shot being fired. On 2 December the Austro-Russian army was defeated at Austerlitz. A few days later the war of the Third Coalition was over.
