= Calcium D-glucarate =

Chemical Compound

Names
- Other names Calcium d-saccharate, Antacidin

Identifiers
CAS Number	5793-88-4; tetrahydrate: 5793-89-5
3D model (JSmol)	Interactive image
ChEMBL	ChEMBL2104217
ChemSpider	136477; tetrahydrate: 10128632
DrugBank	DB13962
ECHA InfoCard	100.024.850
EC Number	227-334-1; tetrahydrate: 611-592-0
KEGG	tetrahydrate: D03307
PubChem CID	154911; tetrahydrate: 11954337
UNII	SST07NLK7J; tetrahydrate: 6AP9J91K4V
CompTox Dashboard (EPA)	DTXSID70227186
- InChI: InChI=1S/C6H10O8.Ca/c7-1(3(9)5(11)12)2(8)4(10)6(13)14;/h1-4,7-10H,(H,11,12)(H,13,14);/q;+2/p-2/t1-,2-,3-,4+;/m0./s1 Key: UGZVNIRNPPEDHM-SBBOJQDXSA-L; tetrahydrate: InChI=1S/C6H10O8.Ca.4H2O/c7-1(3(9)5(11)12)2(8)4(10)6(13)14;;;;;/h1-4,7-10H,(H,11,12)(H,13,14);;4*1H2/q;+2;;;;/p-2/t1-,2-,3-,4+;;;;;/m0...../s1 Key: ZQWFSIZRQANUDA-WQMSYZFBSA-L
- SMILES: [C@H]([C@@H]([C@@H](C(=O)[O-])O)O)([C@H](C(=O)[O-])O)O.[Ca+2]

Properties
Chemical formula	C_{6}H_{8}CaO_{8}
Molar mass	248.200 g·mol^{−1}
- Except where otherwise noted, data are given for materials in their standard state (at 25 °C [77 °F], 100 kPa). Infobox references

Calcium D-glucarate (or calcium saccharate) is the calcium salt of D-glucaric acid (saccharic acid). It is commonly used as a dietary supplement, primarily marketed for its potential role in supporting detoxification processes and hormone regulation. Preclinical studies suggest that calcium D-glucarate may possess anticarcinogenic properties and improve detoxification markers, but more definitive clinical research such as a randomized controlled trial is needed to verify health claims.

== See also ==
- Saccharic acid
- Glucuronidation
