= Battle of Mehrnbach =

1805 battle during the War of the Third Coalition

- Part of the War of the Third Coalition
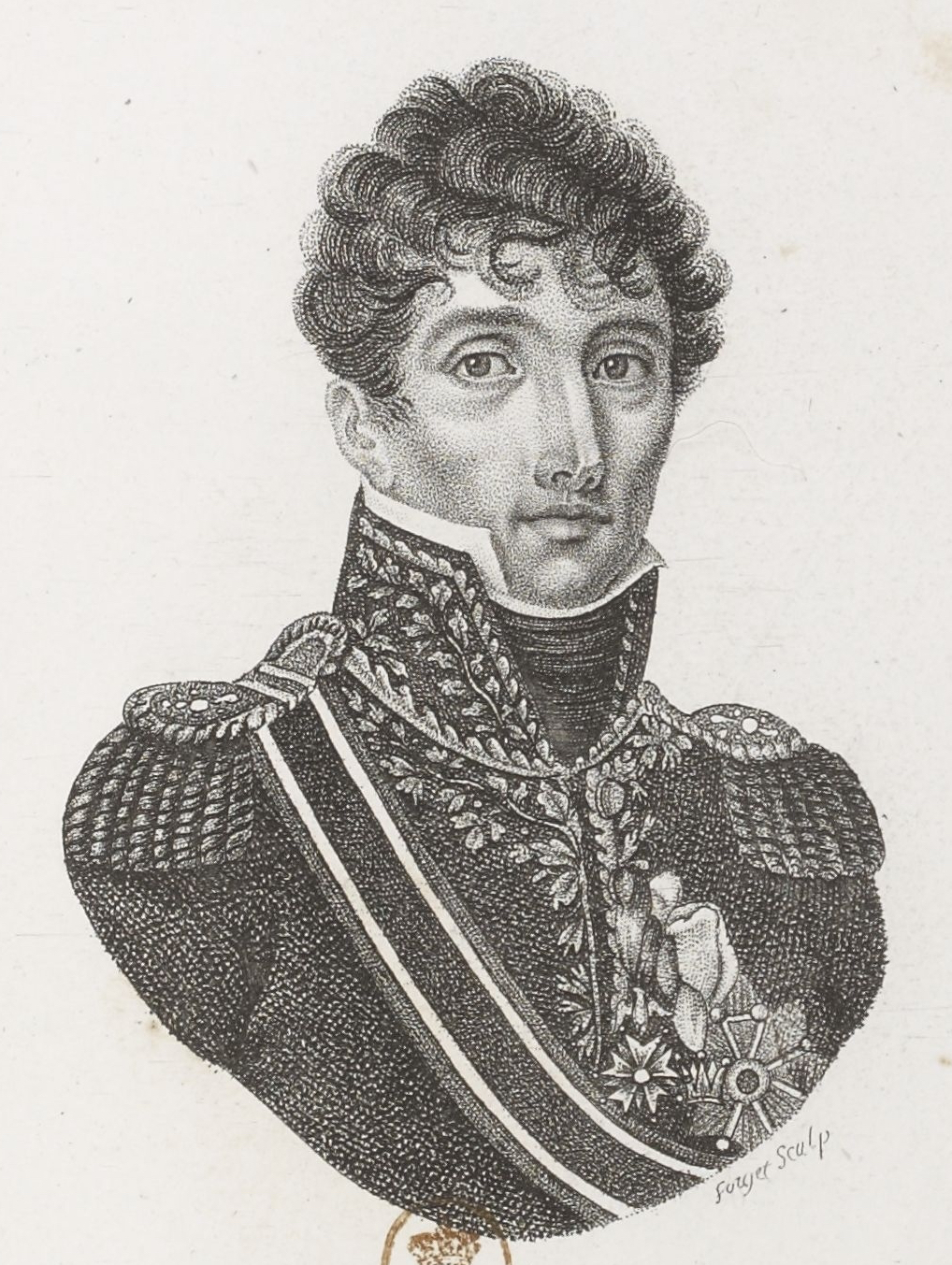
- Marc-Antoine de Beaumont
Date	30 October 1805
Location	Mehrnbach, modern-day Austria 48°12′32″N 13°26′11″E
Result	French victory

Belligerents
France	Russian Empire; Austrian Empire

Commanders and leaders
(First French Empire) Marc Antoine de Beaumont	(Russian Empire) Pyotr Bagration

Casualties and losses
54	Hundreds of POWs

The Battle of Mehrnbach (also known as the Battle of Ried) on 30 October 1805 saw the French vanguard commanded by Marc Antoine de Beaumont engaging an Austro-Russian rearguard detachment during the War of the Third Coalition.

== Background ==
The battle of Mehrnbach took place shortly after the surrender of the Austrian troops in Ulm, from where the road to Vienna lay open to the Grande Armée. The French and Bavarian troops followed the retreating Austrian units commanded by Michael von Kienmayer, which had united with Russian troops at Braunau. In Braunau Maximilian von Merveldt took command of the Austrian troops and led them towards Vienna. There were several rearguard battles in the Danube region.

== Battle ==
The French troops setting off from Braunau marched on the road to Ried. At the head of the column was the 1st Regiment of Chasseurs à Cheval as well as the 8th and 12th Dragoon Regiments. Alongside the cavalry marched an infantry detachment from Davout's Corps (two battalions of the 17th Line Infantry Regiment and two battalions of the 30th Line Infantry Regiment). They were met in the environs of Mehrnbach by an Austrian cavalry unit positioned on the heights. Joachim Murat and his cavalry attacked the Austrian cavalry and threw them back. At the same time, an Austrian infantry company positioned in front of Mehrnbach surrendered to the French. The French official state newspaper Moniteur described the insignificant fighting as the victorious "battle of Ried".

== Aftermath ==
The Austro-Russian troops have been unable to stop the rapidly advancing troops of the Grande Armée. On the same day the French occupied the city of Ried and marched further west, where they clashed with the coalition allies again at Gaspoltshofen.
