= Pyotr Karatygin =

Russian dramatist and actor (1805–1879)

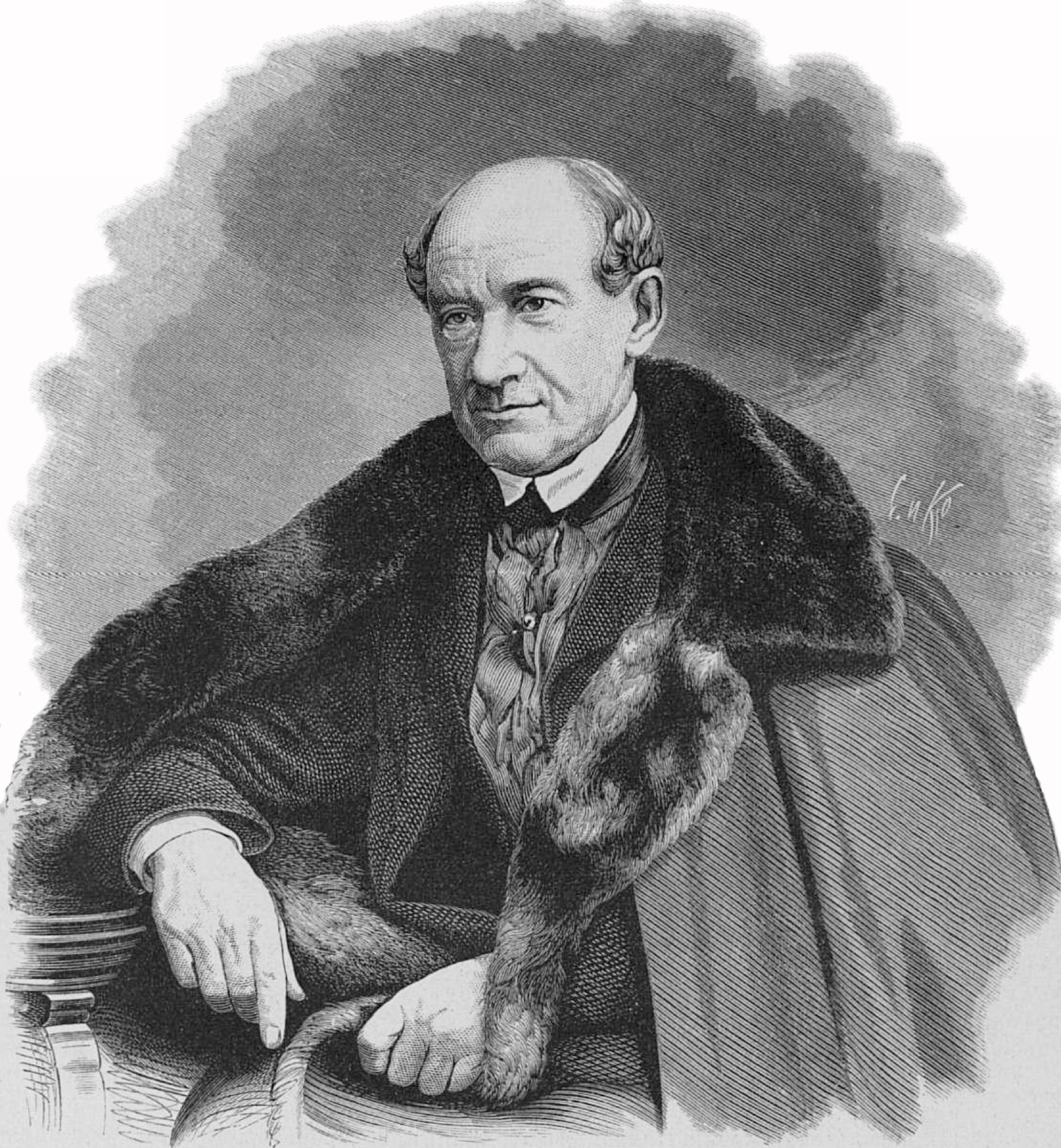
- Born: Пётр Андреевич Каратыгин; July 11, 1805; Saint Petersburg, Russian Empire
- Died: October 6, 1879 (aged 74); Saint Petersburg, Russian Empire
- Occupations: Actor, playwright
- Years active: 1823–1879

Pyotr Andreyevich Karatygin (Russian: Пётр Андреевич Каратыгин, 11 July 1805, Saint Petersburg, Russian Empire – 6 October 1879, Saint Petersburg, Russian Empire) was a Russian dramatist and actor. The tragic actor Vasily Karatygin (1802–1853) was his brother.

Karatygin debuted on stage in 1823 and rose to fame performing in Alexander Griboyedov's Woe from Wit (the parts of Zagoretsky, Repetilov and Chatsky). From 1832 to 1838 he was head of the Drama department in the Saint Petersburg Theatre College, where he discovered and tutored several future Russian stage stars, including Alexander Martynov.

Pyotr Karatygin wrote 68 plays, 53 of them vaudevilles, mostly elaborate variations on foreign plays and Russian novels. In the 1860s and 1870s he wrote a series of short memoirs on the history of the Russian theatre. Edited and previewed by his son, Pyotr Karatygin's Notes were serialized by Russkaya Starina in 1872–1879, to much critical acclaim.

== Literature ==
- Belyaev, M. The History of the Old Russian Vaudeville. The Jubilee Collection, Leningrad, 1925.
- Uspensky, V. The Classic Russian Vaudeville. 1959.
- Smirnov-Sokolsky, N. Pyotr Karatygin's Notebook. Kniga Publishers, 1983.
