= Treaty of Saint Petersburg (1805) =

1805 treaty between Great Britain and Russia

The Treaty of Saint Petersburg was signed on 11 April 1805 by Great Britain and the Russian Empire and created an offensive alliance directed against Napoleon's French Empire.

The two allies were joined by Austria on 9 August 1805 and by Sweden on 3 October 1805 while France was allied to Spain and a number of France's satellite republics. Sweden joined only after Britain granted subsidies that financed almost all Swedish war costs. Sweden armed 10,000 men.

This treaty was one of the main causes of the War of the Third Coalition.
