= Beet sugar factory =

Manufacturing of sugar beet

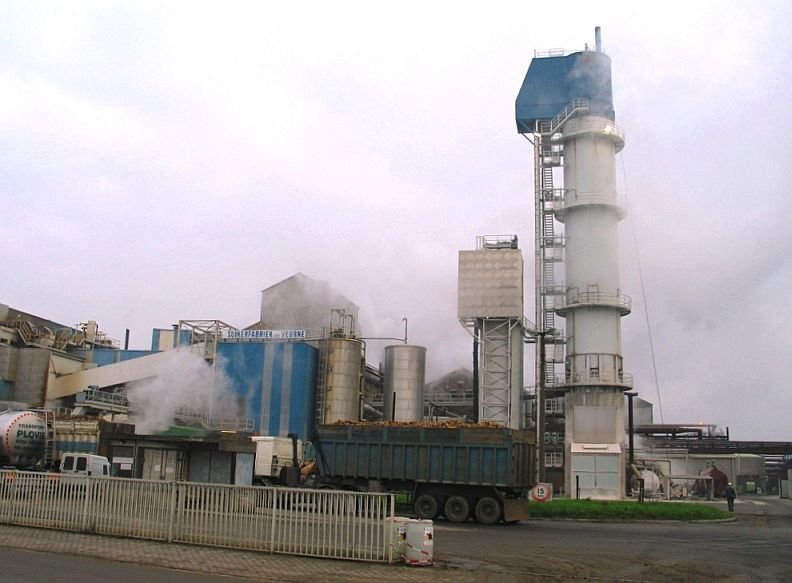
- Sugar factory near Veurne, Belgium in 2004

A beet sugar factory, or sugar factory, is a type of production facility that produces sugar from sugar beets or alternative plants to sugarcane in making refined sugar. These factories process the beets to produce refined sugar, similar to sugarcane in other regions. The process involves several steps, including washing, slicing, and extracting the sugar content through diffusion. Nowadays, most sugar factories also act as sugar refineries. The first beet sugar factory was built in 1802.

== Sugar mill, factory and refinery ==
Beet sugar factories can differ in the extent of the processing:

- Most process sugar beet into white sugar and brown sugar (sucrose or "table sugar").
- Some process beets only as far as an intermediate stage (an unrefined 'raw' sugar or concentrated sugar solution) to be refined elsewhere.
- A few process beets and also process raw sugar from cane in their refining section.
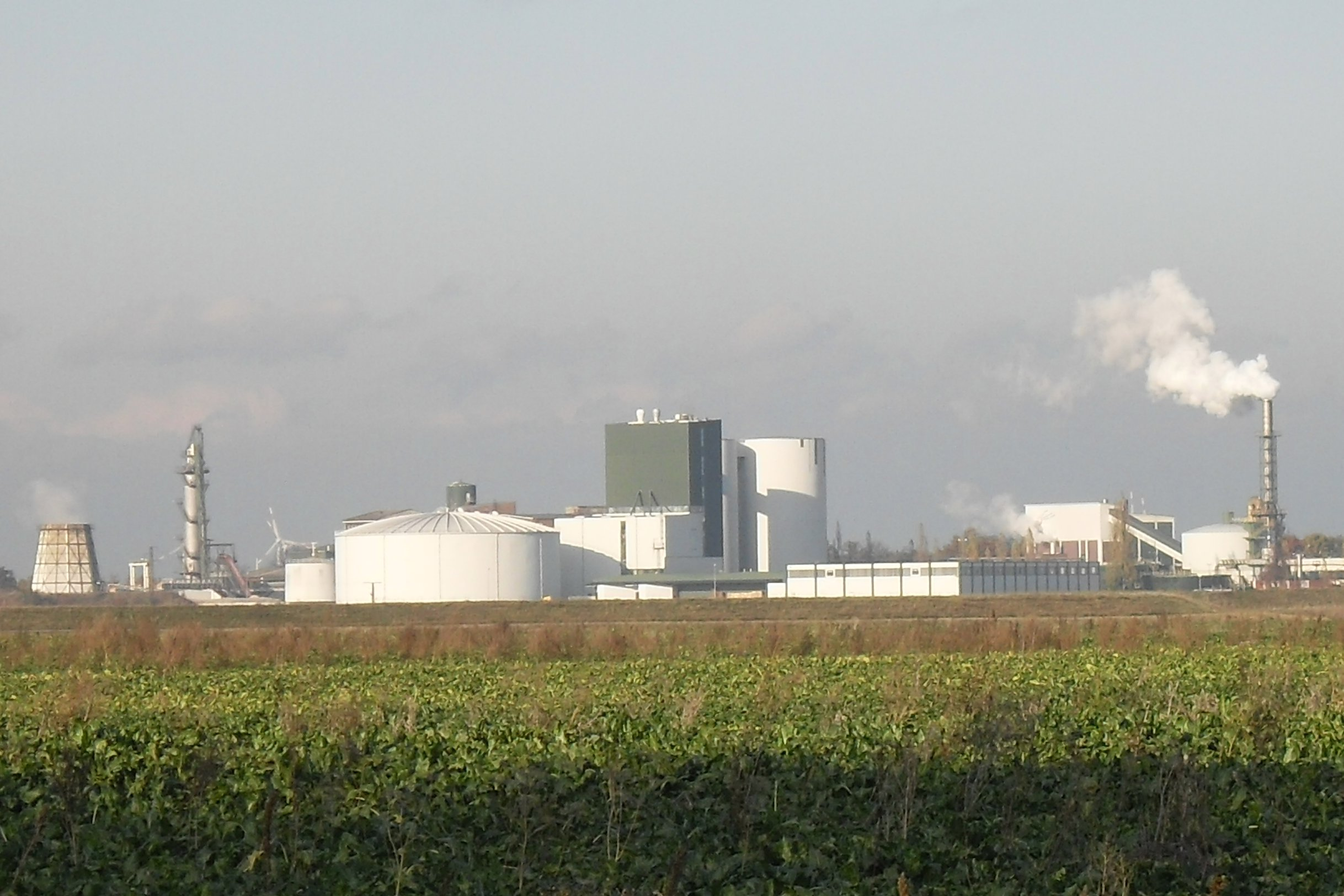
  Südzucker beet sugar factory in Brottewitz, Germany, 2009

The terms sugar mill and sugar refinery were older than the term sugar factory. In the 18th century, the only practical way to produce (raw) sugar was to extract it from sugarcane. The extraction was done with a machine called the sugar mill, which pressed the juice out the sugarcane. Later, the term sugar mill was also applied to the whole facility that produced raw sugar from sugarcane. Most of the raw sugar was transported to sugar refineries, which converted it to white sugar for consumers and other customers. This use of the terms mill and refinery were still very clear in the United States.

When the first facilities to produce sugar from sugar beets were built, these facilities were mostly called manufactories or just factories, simply because they were buildings where something was manufactured. These first sugar factories were modest affairs driven by animals, wind, or waterpower. Like the sugar mills, sugar factories sold most of their raw sugar to sugar refineries. In time, most beet sugar factories began to refine their own production, but this did not lead to them being called refineries. In 2005, all sugar factories in the United States produced only refined sugar, but this was not universal practice.

In the tropics, the introduction of the steam engine put an end to the clear definitions of mill, factory, and refinery. The creation of large separate steam-powered facilities to produce raw sugar led to the separation of the manufacturing of raw sugar from the occupations of the planter. These buildings were also called sugar factories. Nowadays, the distinction between a sugar mill and a (cane) sugar factory is in whether it refines the raw sugar that it produces or sells it. This explains why in India EID Parry refers to sugar factories.

== Sugar beet processing ==
In the 1960s, beet sugar processing was described as consisting of eight steps, but these can be further divided into smaller steps. Transport could be considered the first step although it was not considered a direct part of production. However, transport cost was very important for the scale at which processing could take place. Storage was an important separate step as well. Purification of the sugary liquid extracted from the beet, including carbonatation and crystallization, are not specific to sugar beet processing, and similar steps are used in the production of sugar from sugarcane. Therefore, these were the primary part of the Sugar refining process.

=== Transport ===
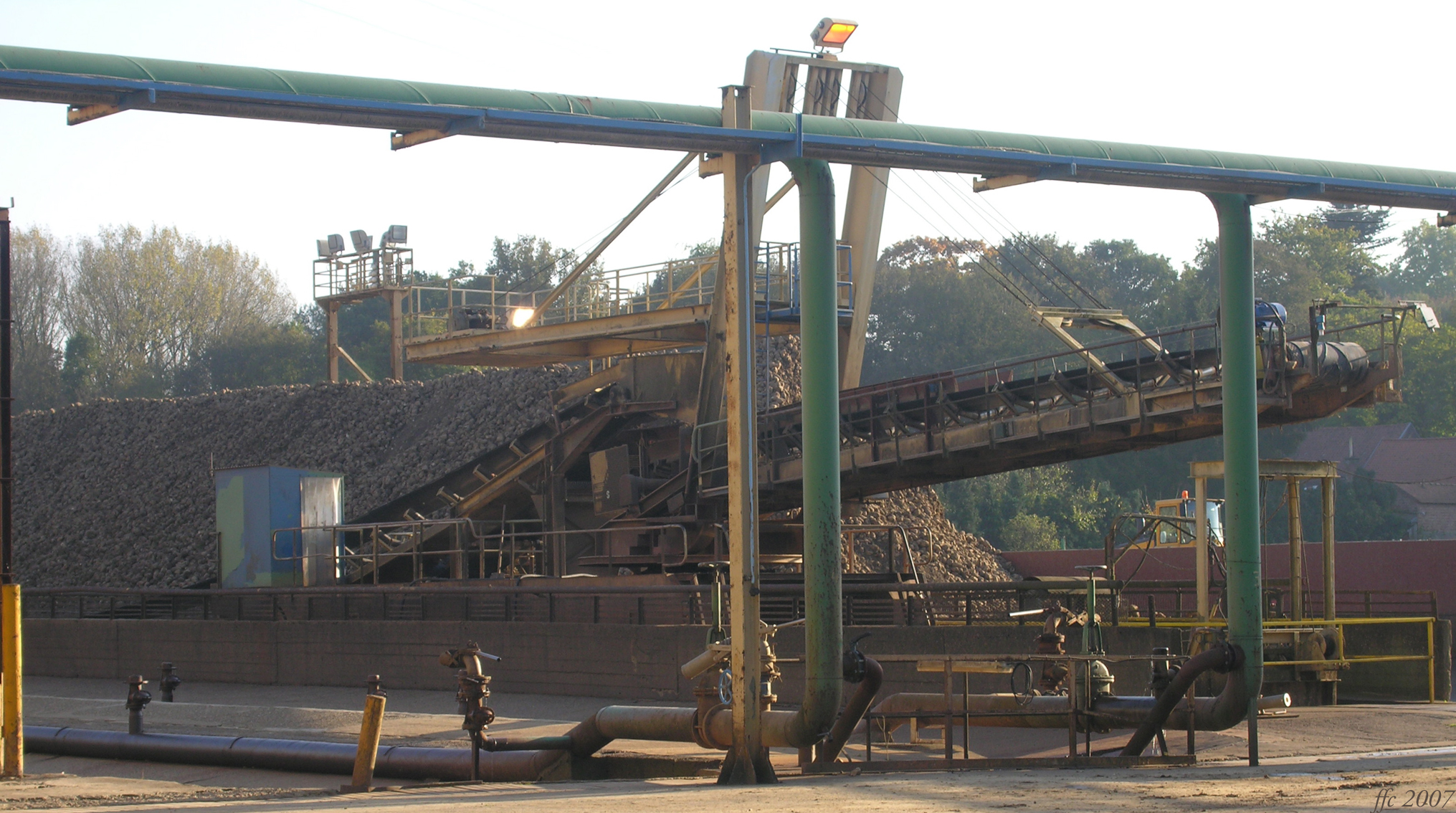
Sugar beet on heaps

After they are harvested, beets are transported to a factory. In the United Kingdom, beets are transported by a hauler, or by a tractor and a trailer by local farmers. In Ireland, some beets were carried by rail, until the complete shutdown of Irish Sugar beet production in 2006.

In areas with good navigable inland waterways, transport by boat used to be prevalent. See e.g. the media related to boat transport to Halfweg sugar factory in the Netherlands. In time, it was replaced by road transport, but due to the increased cost, traffic congestion and environmental concerns, boat transport came into use again for longer distances in 2021.

A mode of transport that has almost disappeared is the transport of raw juice by pipeline. The concept is that one or more râperies first extract the raw juice from the sugar beet. The juice is then transported by pipeline to a central sugar factory. The Râperie de Longchamps in Belgium is the last remaining râperie in Europe.

==== Reception ====
On arrival at the factory, each load is weighed and sampled at the tare-house. The beet sample is checked for:

- soil tare: the amount of soil and other detritus from harvesting that is included in the load;
- crown tare: the amount of beet that forms the crown of the root. This has a lower sugar content than the rest of the root and has less value to the operator;
- sugar content ("pol"): a measurement of the amount of sucrose in the crop;
- nitrogen content: for recommending future fertilizer use to the farmer.

From these elements, the actual sugar content of the load is calculated, and the grower's payment determined.

=== Storage ===
The load is then tipped onto the reception area, typically a flat concrete pad. From there, the beets are moved into large heaps. When it is time to process them, the beets are moved into a central channel or gulley and are washed towards the processing plant.

=== Washing and scrubbing ===
The next step of the production process is washing and scrubbing. This is done by moving the beet around in washing and scrubbing tanks not unlike a washing machine. However, the actual washing is caused by the friction of the sugar beets against each other. This removes sand and stones and other objects.

=== Slicing ===
The cleaned beets are then mechanically sliced into fine "v" cross-section strips, called cossettes. The V-shape maximizes the area of the slice while maintaining some rigidity to the cossette so it is not completely broken up in the diffuser.

=== Diffusion ===
The cossettes are then passed to a machine called a diffuser. Here hot water permeates them to extract the sugar content into a water solution, a process known as leaching. The diffusion process ends with two products: raw juice and beet pulp.

Diffusers are long vessels of many meters in which the beet slices go in one direction while the hot water goes in the opposite direction ("counter current"). The movement may either be caused by a rotating screw moving the cossettes or the whole unit rotating in which case the water and cossettes move through internal chambers of the drum. The three common designs of diffuser are the horizontal rotating "RT" (named after Raffinerie Tirlemontoise the original manufacturer), inclined screw "DDS" (from the Danish company De Danske Sukkerfabrikker ), or vertical screw "Tower". Modern tower extraction plants have a processing capacity of up to 17,000 metric tons (16,700 long tons; 18,700 short tons) per day. A less-common design uses a moving belt that carries the cossettes over a series of tanks. Water is pumped onto the top of the belt and passes through the cossettes into the tank below which it is pumped over the next section. In all cases, the flow rates of cossettes and water are in the ratio one to two. Typically, cossettes take about 90 minutes to pass through the diffuser, the water only 45 minutes. These countercurrent exchange methods extract more sugar from the cossettes using less water than if they merely sat in a hot water tank. The liquid exiting the diffuser is called "raw juice". The color of raw juice varies from black to a dark red depending on the amount of oxidation, which is itself dependent on diffuser design.

The used cossettes, now called beet pulp, exit the diffuser at about 95% moisture, but low sucrose content. Using screw presses, the wet pulp is then pressed down to 75% moisture. This recovers additional sucrose in the liquid pressed out of the pulp, and reduces the energy needed to dry the pulp. The liquid pressed out of the pulp is combined with the raw juice, or more often introduced into the diffuser at the appropriate point in the countercurrent process. The final byproduct, vinasse, is used as fertilizer or growth substrate for yeast cultures.

During diffusion, a portion of the sucrose breaks down into invert sugars. These can undergo further breakdown into acids. These breakdown products are not only losses of sucrose, but also have knock-on effects reducing the final output of processed sugar from the factory. (Note: As a rough rule, every ton of non-sugars takes an equivalent weight of sucrose to molasses) To limit (thermophilic) bacterial action, the feed water may be dosed with formaldehyde and control of the feed water pH is also practiced. Attempts at operating diffusion under alkaline conditions have been made, but the process has proven problematic. The improved sucrose extraction in the diffuser is offset by processing problems in the next stages.

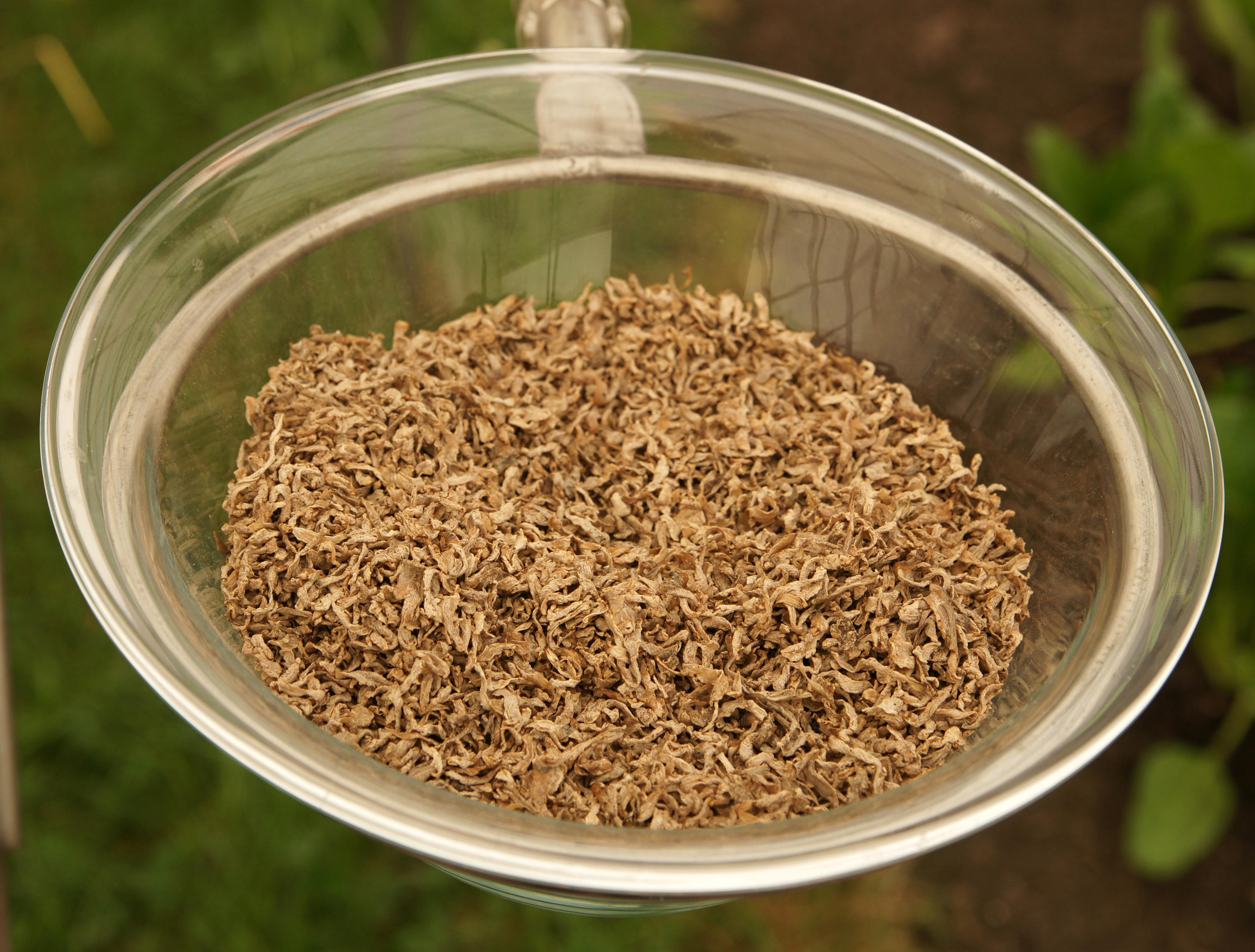
Dried sugar beet cossettes

The products of the diffusion step are beet pulp and raw juice. The beet pulp is generally used as livestock feed. It can be sold directly as "wet pulp", but wet pulp has high moisture and soon develops mold. Dried pulp has higher value whether sold as shreds or pelleted. Pulp can also be mixed with molasses during the drying process for higher nutrient content. The raw juice moves to the next processing stages for removal of impurities and conversion to solid sugar.

== Sugar refining ==
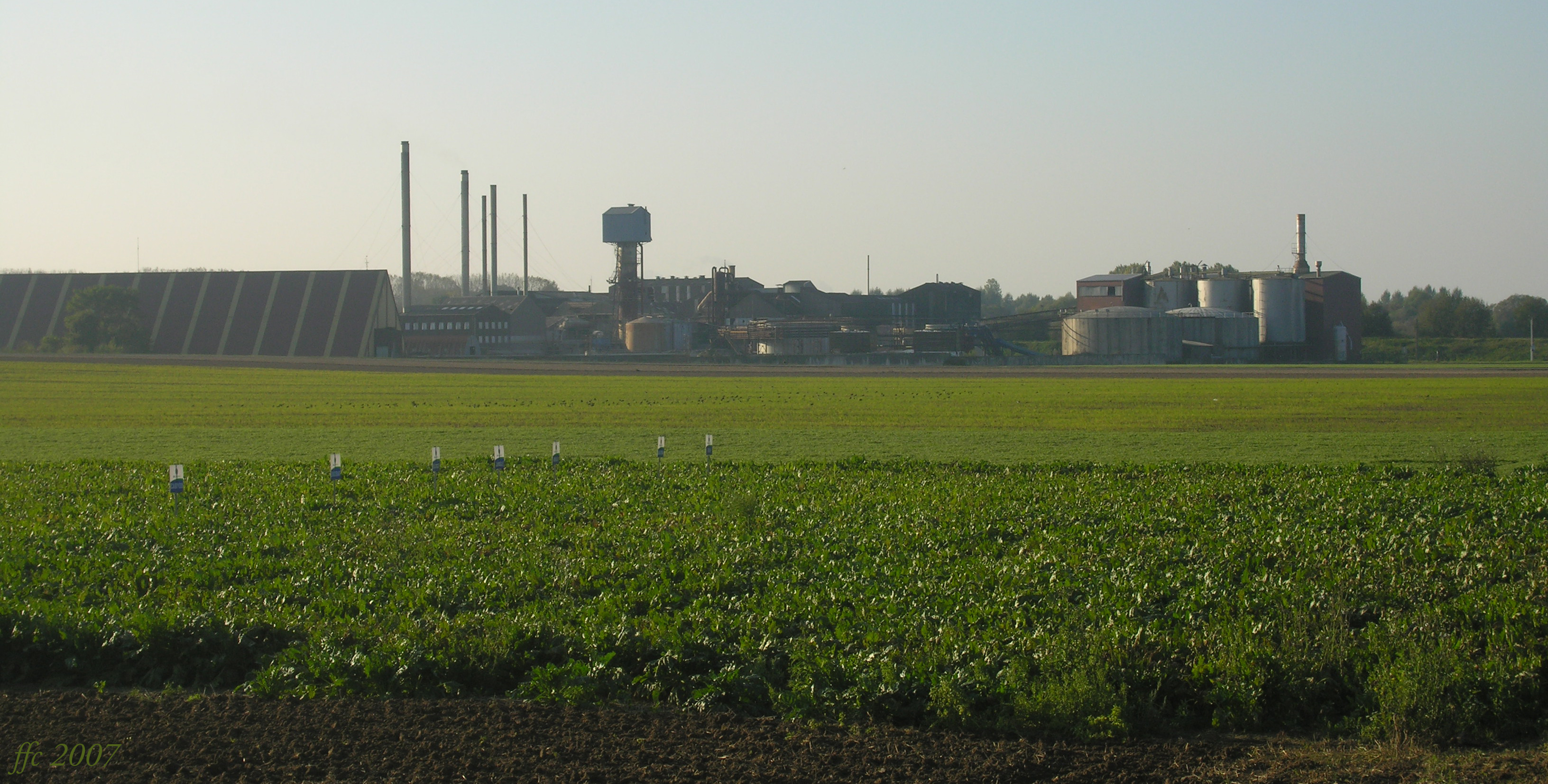
A sugar beet farm in Belgium: Beyond the field is the sugar factory.

The production of white sugar from the beet extract is similar in some parts to the production of sugar from raw sugar derived from sugar cane but adapted to the particular circumstances of beet.

=== Purification ===
The raw juice first undergoes purification to remove impurities which affect white sugar recovery quantity and quality. The steps commonly used for beet are carbonatation and sulphonation. Carbonatation uses milk of lime, an alkaline liquid produced from calcium hydroxide, together with carbon dioxide (the exhaust from the lime kiln that produces the lime) to precipitate impurities into a form that can be removed from the raw juice. In the carbonation step, proteins are coagulated, and the calcium carbonate forms solid particles which incorporate the coagulated materials, pieces of vegetable matter, and absorb some soluble impurities. The high alkalinity destroys monosaccharides and other compounds which are thermally unstable and would breakdown in subsequent processing steps. The precipitate is removed by gravitation and filtration to leave a clear, lighter colored alkaline (ph 8.4 to 9.4) liquid known as thin juice. Flocculants may be used in the process to speed separation of precipitate. Thin juice may then undergo a sulphonation step, in which sulfur dioxide is used to bleach this juice.

The addition of milk of lime and carbon dioxide may be in sequential steps (DDS or RT) with pre-liming and primary and secondary carbonatation steps separated by filtration of precipitates or in a process where juice is continuous cycling through primary and secondary steps to build particle size with a clarifier and rotary filters to remove precipitate (Dorr Oliver).

=== Evaporation ===
The thin juice is concentrated by multi-effect evaporation to make a "thick juice", roughly 60% sucrose by weight. For more efficient scaling of the refining equipment to the beet processing stage, raw juice at around 70% dry solids can be stored and refined after the beet slicing campaign.

=== Crystallization ===
In a beet sugar refinery, the only outputs are white crystalline sugar and molasses; intermediate products in the process are recycled.

The crystallization process starts by loading vacuum boiling pans ("white pans") with standard liquor (a mixture of raw juice and low-grade sugar). The liquor is heated under reduced pressure to supersaturation. Seed crystals are added to the pan to act as the basis for the formation of crystals. The sucrose in the liquor crystallizes on the seed; when the crystals in the pan have reached the desired size (around 0.5 mm) the contents of the pan are emptied via a receiver tank into centrifuges to separate crystals from the remaining sugar liquor. The crystals are given a brief wash in the centrifuge. The remaining liquor ("high green", about 50% of the pan's contents) which still contains significant amounts of sugar is then boiled again (in "raw pans") to produce more crystals but of a lower quality with more impurities and color. The sugar from this boiling is separated in centrifuges and remelted to feed the first stage, the residual liquor ("low green") may be boiled again (in "after product" (AP) pans) to separate the last of the recoverable crystal sugar. The remaining liquor at this stage is known as beet molasses. The AP sugar may be affined with liquor to wash the crystals before re-melting.

The white sugar from the pans is dried and cooled in granulators and sent to storage. From storage the sugar is graded to give consistent particle size distribution for sale. Sugar crystals outside the specification are returned to the pans for reprocessing. Further grades of sugar e.g. icing sugar/powdered sugar are produced by milling.

=== Molasses sugar recovery ===
The molasses from sugar beets still contains a significant amount of sugar - typically around 50% sucrose by weight. The remainder of molasses is fructose and glucose produced as breakdown products of sucrose during processing and soluble anions and cations from the beet such as potassium, sodium, chlorides, and nitrogen compounds.

The Steffen Process was used to recover sucrose from molasses, so advanced beet sugar factories had a "Steffen house" next to the plant. Sucrose was precipitated as a calcium saccharate and filtered off. During World War I, when imported potash from European sources was unavailable in the United States, "Steffen's wastewater" provided a good source, leading to a profitable income stream for a factory. The need disappeared immediately after the war.

In the 1950s, industrial fermentation advanced to produce monosodium glutamate (MSG), previously produced in Japan by the expensive racemization process. Beet sugar molasses, with a Corynebacterium (especially Corynebacterium glutamicum) and combined with penicillin or a surfactant to block biotin, produced MSG as a result, which effectively produced large profits from what was formerly waste.

== Byproducts ==
=== Carbonation-lime residue ===
During the refining process, raw beet sugar requires much more lime for purification. Carbonation-lime residue contains about 80% Calcium carbonate and is therefore used to improve agricultural land.

=== Molasses ===
The beet-sugar molasses that remain from the crystallization phase are the most valuable byproduct. It can be sold on the yeast fermentation, pharmaceutical, and animal food markets. The molasses can be added to the beet pulp before drying to give a higher value product.

When the factory has a Molasses Desugaring by chromatography (MDC) process, processing leads to two more by-products:

- concentrated molasses solids (CMS), which contains mainly minerals and is usually sold to the animal feed industry.
- Betaine chiefly through chromatographic separation, using techniques such as the "simulated moving bed".

== Waste products ==
The processing of beet produces large amounts of water; beet as delivered to the factory has high water content. Water has to be held in lagoons before processing and release.

The soil and gravel washed from beet at reception may not be permitted to be returned to agricultural land but can be sold on as aggregate and topsoil for landscaping.

== History of the beet sugar industry ==
=== First sugar factories ===
Under the patronage of Frederick William III of Prussia, Franz Karl Achard opened the world's first beet sugar factory in 1801, at Kunern, Silesia (now Konary, Poland). The idea to produce sugar from beet was soon introduced to France, where Napoleon opened schools specifically for studying the plant. He also ordered that 28,000 hectares (69,000 acres) be devoted to growing sugar beet. This was in response to British naval blockades of France during the Napoleonic Wars (and the reciprocal Continental System imposed by Napoleon), which limited cane sugar imports to Europe and ultimately stimulated the rapid growth of a European sugar beet industry. By 1840, about 5% of the world's sugar was derived from sugar beets, and by 1880, this number had risen more than tenfold to over 50%. The sugar beet was introduced to North America after 1830, with the first commercial production starting in 1879 at a farm in Alvarado, California. The sugar beet was also introduced to Chile by German settlers around 1850.

=== France ===
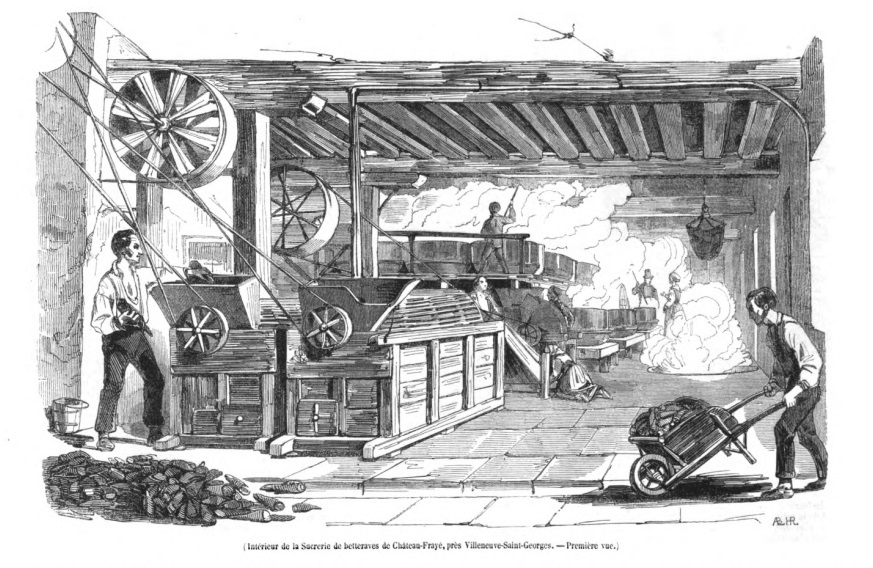
1840s depiction of a French sugar beet mill in operation

The work of Achard soon attracted the attention of Napoleon, who appointed a commission of scientists to go to Silesia to investigate Achard's factory. Upon their return, two small factories were constructed near Paris. Although these factories were not altogether a success, the results attained greatly interested Napoleon. Thus, when British naval blockades and the Haitian Revolution made the importation of cane sugar untenable, Napoleon seized the opportunity offered by beet sugar to address the shortage. In 1811, Napoleon issued a decree appropriating one million francs for the establishment of sugar schools and compelling the farmers to plant a large acreage of sugar beets the following year. He also prohibited the further importation of sugar from the Caribbean effective in 1813.

The number of mills increased considerably during the 1820s and 1830s, reaching a peak of 543 in 1837. The number was down to 382 in 1842, producing about 22.5 million kg of sugar during that year.

=== Western Europe ===
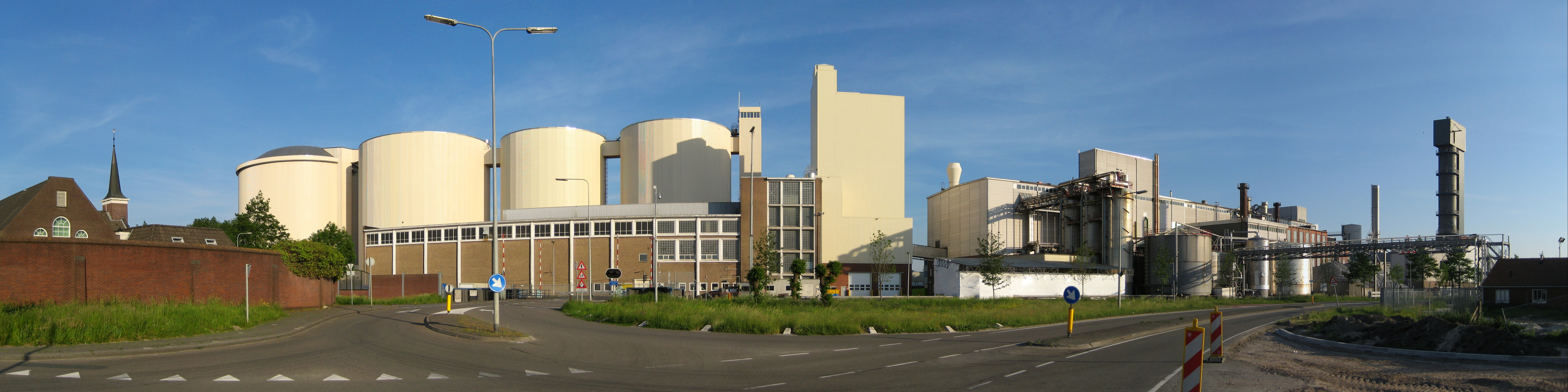
Vierverlaten sugar factory in Groningen, Netherlands, 2012

As a result of the French advances in sugar beet production and processing made during the Napoleonic Wars, the beet sugar industry in Europe developed rapidly. A new tax levied in Germany in 1810 prompted the experimentation to increase the sugar content of the beet. This was because the tax assessed the value of the sugar beet crop based on the unprocessed weight of the sugar beet rather than the refined sugar produced from them. By 1812, Frenchman Jean-Baptiste Quéruel, working for the industrialist Benjamin Delessert, devised a process of sugar extraction suitable for industrial application. By 1837, France had become the largest sugar beet producer in the world, a position it continued to hold in the world even into 2010. By 1837, 542 factories in France were producing 35,000 tons of sugar. However, by 1880, Germany became the largest producer of sugar from sugar beet in the world, since the German factories processed most of the sugar beets grown in eastern France.

By the 1850s, sugar beet production had reached Russia and Ukraine. This was made possible by the protection of the sugar beet industry by bounties, or subsidies, paid to beet sugar producers upon the export of their sugar by their respective governments. The protection provided to the sugar beet industry by these bounties caused drastic damage to the cane sugar industry and their grip on the British sugar market. The result was a reduction in the production of cane sugar, molasses and rum until 1915. During World War I, the widespread conflict destroyed large tracts of land that had served sugar beet producers and repurposed much of the remaining sugar beet land for grain production. This resulted in a shortage that revived the shrinking cane sugar industry.

The sugar industry in the EU came under bureaucratic pressure in 2006 and ultimately resulted in the loss of 20,000 jobs, although many factories, as detailed in a later 2010 EU audit, were found to have been mistakenly shut down, as they were profitable without government intervention. In 2021/2022 the European Union was a small net importer of sugar.

=== United States ===
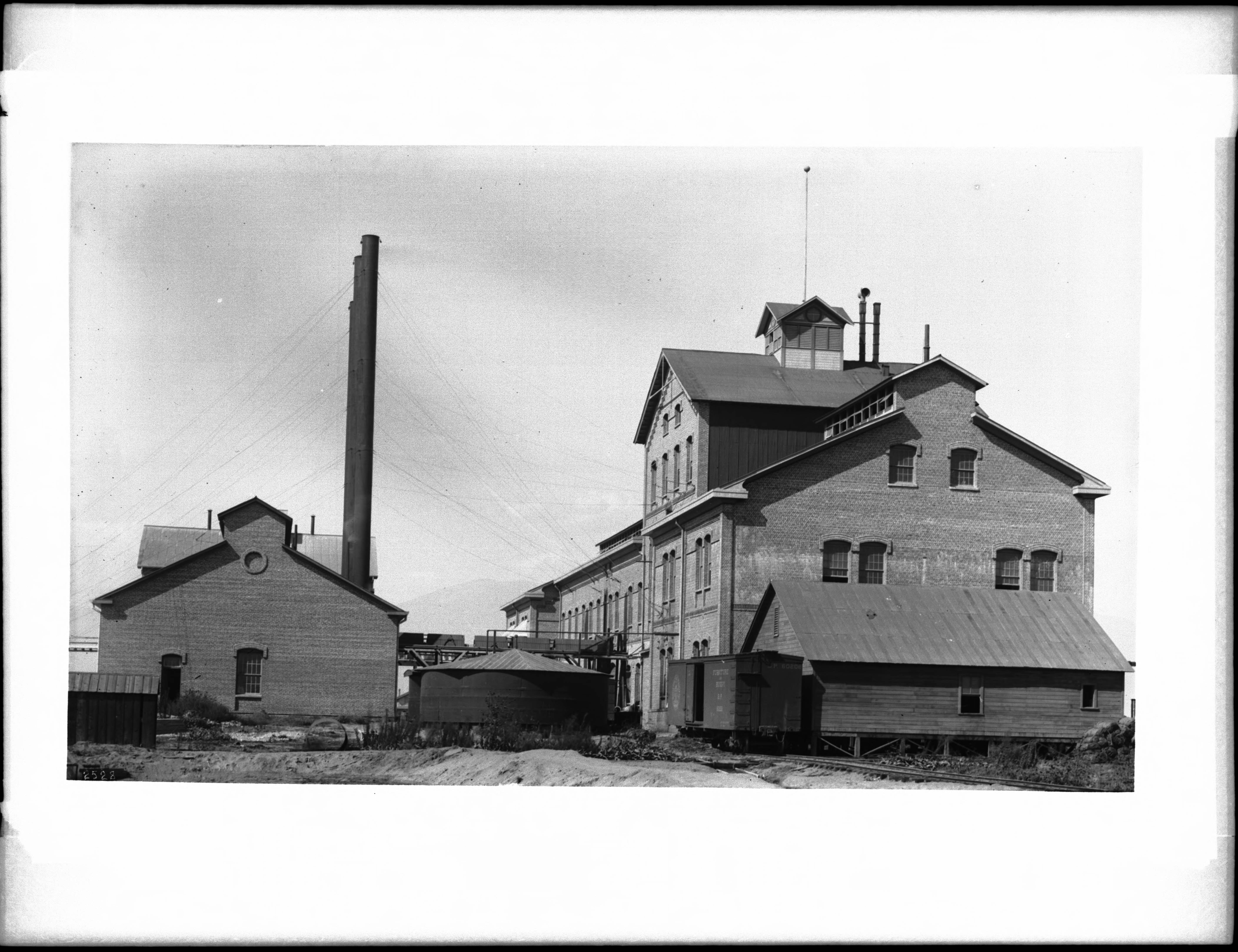
A beet sugar processing plant in Chino, California, ca.1900

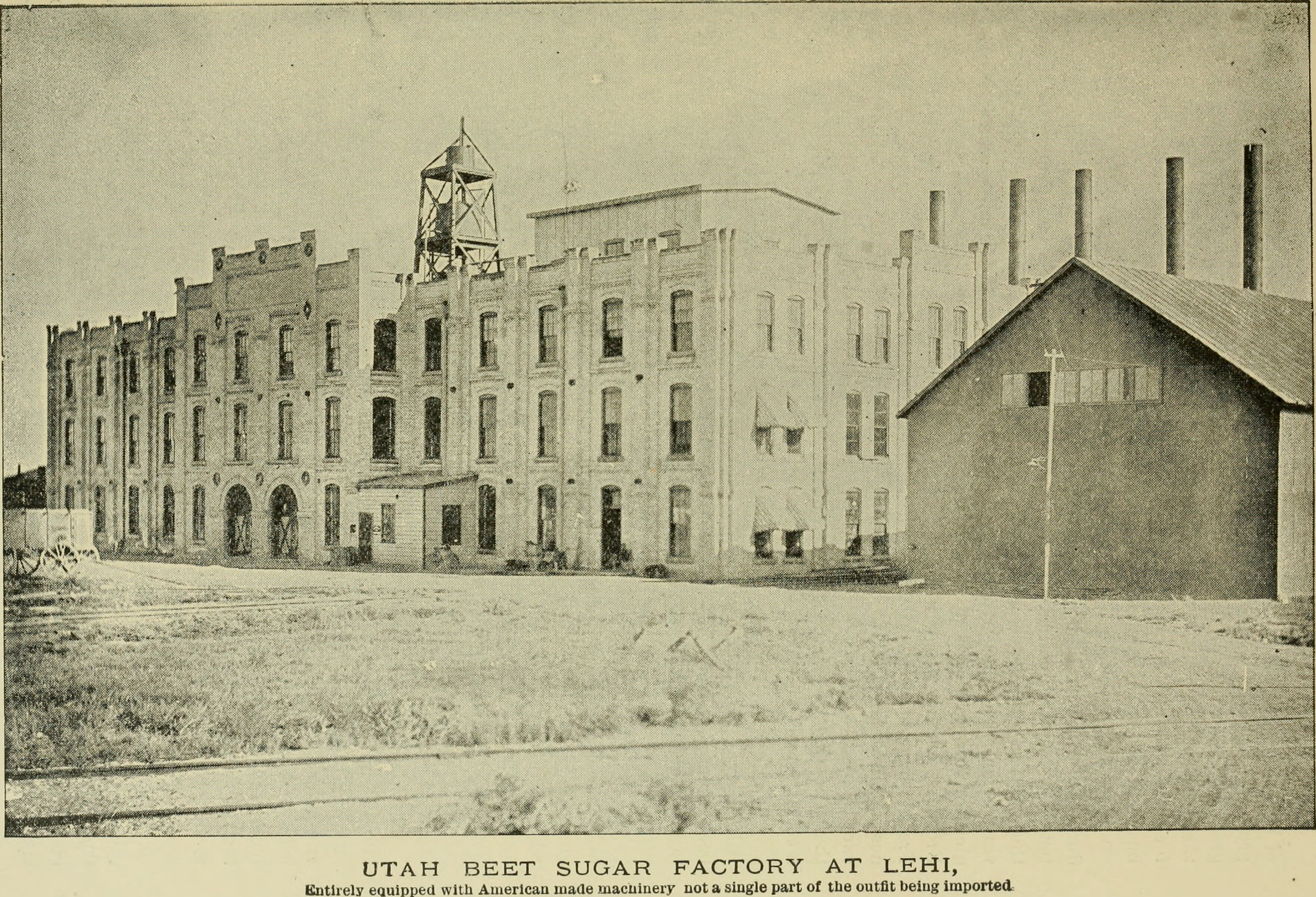
Sugar factory in Lehi, Utah, 1915

In the 1820s, the abolitionists in New England wanted to abolish slavery by boycotting the products that were made by slaves. They started to import sugar from Asia (called "free sugar" because it was grown without slavery), but this sugar tasted "awful". In order to overcome the problems of the "free sugar" from Asia, the "Beet Sugar Society of Philadelphia" was founded in 1836. It promoted cottage-produced beet sugar as an alternative to the slave-produced cane sugar from the West Indies. All pre-1870 movement failed, primarily because it approached the subject with naïve optimism and without sufficient capital. An attempt in Utah by the LDS Church-owned Deseret Manufacturing Company in the 1850s was carefully planned and funded but failed due to saline soil conditions.

After many failures, E. H. Dyer acquired a defunct sugar factory in Alvarado, California (now Union City) in 1879 and succeeded in making sugar in commercially viable amounts. It was soon joined by the Western Beet Sugar Company in Watsonville The Oxnard brothers brought sugar beet cultivation to the plains, when they opened a factory in Grand Island, Nebraska. In Utah, Arthur Stayner and others were able to convince LDS Church leaders to support a second attempt. It led to the Utah-Idaho Sugar Company, which had Dyer built its factory in Lehi, Utah in 1890.

Capital investment in factories demanded an adequate supply of sugar beets. In central Colorado and western Nebraska, this was provided substantially by Germans from Russia who were already expert at sugar beet farming when they immigrated in large numbers circa 1890–1905. The United States now also began to catch up with Europe in research. The work of Rachel Lloyd at the University of Nebraska in the late 1880s resulted in a large production increase in the state of Nebraska.

By 1914, the sugar beet industry in the US matched the production of its European counterparts. The largest producers of beet sugar in the US were California, Utah, and Nebraska until the outbreak of World War II. In California, Japanese Americans were an important constituent in farming and production. When they were interned during World War II, California's beet sugar production stalled, and was largely shifted to inland states such as Idaho, Montana, North Dakota, and Utah. In many of the regions where new sugar beet farms were started during the war, farmers were unfamiliar with beet sugar cultivation, so they hired Japanese-American workers from internment camps who were familiar with sugar beet production to work on the farms.

In 1935, the inputs required to process 1 short ton (2,000.00 lb; 907.18 kg) of beets to sugar was outlined as follows:

- 80 pounds (36 kg) limestone
- 250 pounds (110 kg) coke (to convert limestone to quicklime)
- 2,500 US gallons (9,500 L; 2,100 imp gal) water

Sugar beets are grown in 11 states and in 2014, represented 50-55% of the US domestic sugar production. Sugarcane accounts for about 45% of US domestic sugar production. In 1995 sugarcane was grown commercially in Florida, Hawaii, Louisiana, Texas, and Puerto Rico. In 2016 the last sugar plantation and mill of Hawaii closed down.

=== United Kingdom ===
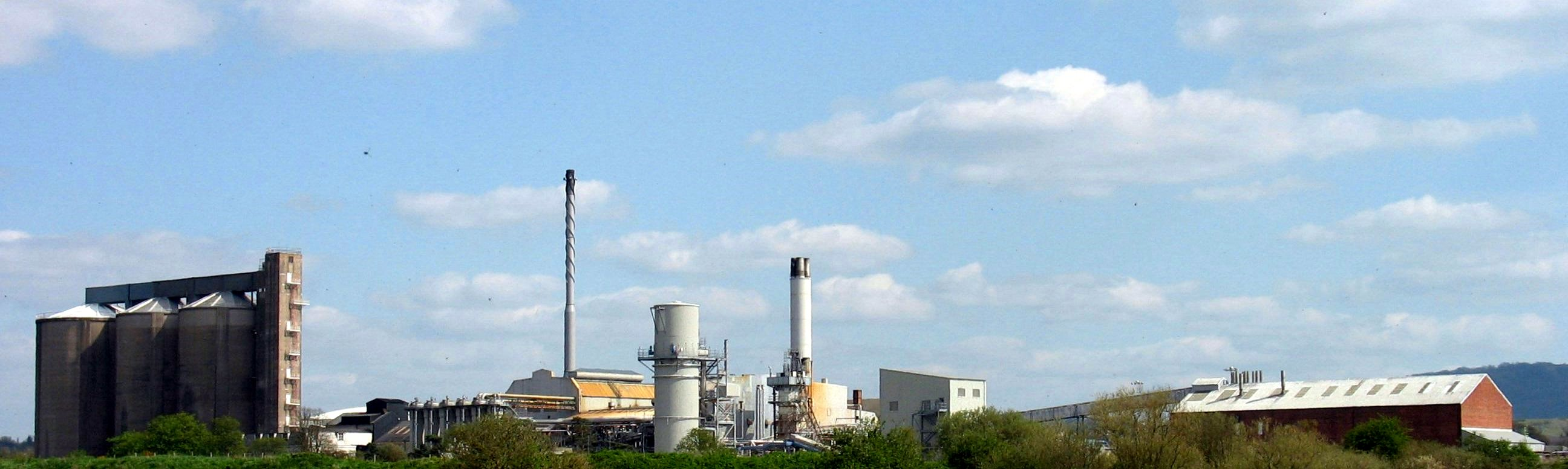
The sugar factory of Allscott, closed down in 2006

Before World War I, the United Kingdom imported raw sugar from the cheapest market within its empire. The first sugar beet processing factory became operational at Lavenham in Suffolk in 1869. It failed, possibly because it lacked the government support that its counterparts on the continent received. By the end of the century, sugar production had ceased and the factory was re-purposed as a store house for horsehair and matting. In 1905 it was completely destroyed by a fire.

The Dutch built the first successful factory at Cantley in Norfolk in 1912, and it was moderately successful since, because of its Dutch backing, it received Dutch bounties. Sugar beet seed from France was listed in the annual catalogues of Gartons Agricultural Plant Breeders from that firm's inception in 1898 until the first of their own varieties was introduced in 1909.

When World War I created a shortage of sugar, it prompted the development of domestic sugar production. In 1915, the British Sugar Beet Society was formed to create an example of a domestic sugar beet industry for the purpose of obtaining government financing which was delivered by the British Sugar (Subsidy) Act 1925. The sugar beet industry in the United Kingdom was finally subsidized, providing stability to the domestic industry that had experienced volatile shifts in profits and losses in the years since 1915. In the 1920s 17 processing factories were built. The British Power Alcohol Association was founded in 1924 to promote the use of beets for fuel.

In 1936, the British sugar beet industry was nationalized in the form of the British Sugar Corporation; this later returned to private ownership becoming British Sugar the sole beet processor in the UK. Following concentration of processing at a few sites by 2009 there were four sugar factories in the United Kingdom (three in East Anglia and one in East Midlands). The Wissington factory is the largest in Europe by the amount of sugar beet processed (3 million tonnes) a year. Wissington supplies over half of the UK's sugar.

=== Russia ===
References to the sugar manufacturing from beets in Russia date back to 1802. Jacob Esipov built the first Russian commercial factory producing sugar from beets in the Tula Oblast. During the Soviet period, some particularly impressive advancements were made in seed development, of which the most useful was the development of frost-resistant sugar beet, further expanding the growing range of the sugar beets.

=== Australia and New Zealand ===
There were various attempts, after 1865, to farm sugar beets in the Australian colony, later state, of Victoria. An industry was established in the district around Maffra in 1896. It became unprofitable due to a drought in 1899 and the factory was taken over by the Victorian government. It was reopened in 1910, and the industry flourished during the inter-war years. Production peaked in 1939–1940. The Second World War affected the industry by taking away its labor force. After the war ended, local farmers preferred dairying to labor-intensive and less-profitable sugar beet production, and the factory closed in 1948. It was the only significant sugar beet factory in Australia. Australia continues to be a major sugar producer, but all production is from sugarcane grown in Queensland and northern New South Wales.

Sugar beet is widely grown in New Zealand as cattle feed, and this practice has spread to some parts of Australia.
