= Maria Zhukova =

Russian author

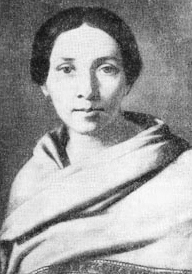
- Born: 1805; Arzamas, Russia
- Died: April 26, 1855 (aged 49–50); Saratov, Russia

Maria Semyonovna Zhukova (Russian: Мари́я Семёновна Жу́кова, 1805 – April 26, 1855) was a Russian writer. After divorcing from her husband, she used writing to earn money. She wrote short stories, accounts of her travels, and even a novella.

== Biography ==
Maria Semyonovna Zhukova was born in 1805 in Arzamas, where her father was a lawyer. They later moved to Saratov. Maria spent her early years in the Tambov province and grew up in a reasonably modest upper class family, where she gained a critical but affectionate appreciation of provincial ways. Her early education in languages and literature was most likely acquired while she was a companion to a daughter of the local nobility.

Maria was married at the age of 17 or 18 to a local landowner who served as a district judge. The marriage did not persist past the early stages. They eventually separated, but only after Maria had given birth to her only son. Maria was then left to raise her child by herself after becoming estranged to her husband in the 1820s.

She moved to Saint Petersburg around 1830 and began publishing in 1837 with the support of her friend Princess Golitsyna.Unlike many women writers before her time, she began writing out of economic necessity as she supported herself and her child, and worked to pay off some of her husband's debts. Additionally, Zhukova was a skilled illustrator and draftswoman. Her precarious financial position required her to call upon any other profitable skills she had, and therefore, she relied on this profession as well as her writing. Her first story appeared in 1837, and she published works actively between 1837-1842 and slowly decreased publication until nearly ceasing in 1844. Her first success came with the two-volume story collection Evenings on the Karpovka (1838-1839). Her two-volume collection Tales (1840) was well-received, as was her Sketches of Southern France and Nice (1844). Some of Zhukova's stories are historical, and some are set abroad with non-Russian characters, a common feature of Russian fiction in the Romantic and post-Romantic period.

Zhukova's health was a primary concern throughout her life. It posed difficulties even as early as 1837 when she originally started publishing. Throughout her later life, Maria spent her winters in southern Russia and the Mediterranean. Due to the scant literature on Zhukova, the cause of her death is unknown.

Maria was married at the age of 17 or 18 to a local landowner who served as a district judge. The marriage was unhappy. Maria's husband was originally wealthy, but lost his money gambling and going on sprees. They eventually separated, but only after Maria had given birth to her only son.

Zhukova moved to Saint Petersburg around 1830. Several years later she began writing to support herself and her child, and to pay off some of her husband's debts. Her first story appeared in 1837, and she published works to various degrees of regularity up until her death. Her first success came with the two-volume story collection Evenings on the Karpovka (1838-1839). Her two-volume collection Tales (1840) was well-received, as was her Sketches of Southern France and Nice (1844). Many of Zhukova's stories are historical, and some are set abroad with non-Russian characters, a common feature of Russian fiction in the Romantic period.

== Literary Themes and Scholarly Impact ==
=== Writing as a Woman's Profession ===
Although historically, there were significantly fewer female writers than male writers in Russia, the amount of Russian women's writing that has been translated into English is far less proportionate than that of Russian literature written by men. In fact, a good deal of foundational women's writing on the 19th century only started being translated in the 1990s. Therefore, even by being semi-successful as Russian female writer and having works that survived into the 21st century meant that writers like Zhukova who entered the profession due to economic necessity and seemed to, "have been little conscious of her status as a literary pioneer," could be considered foundational to this literary tradition. In fact, Zhukova was one of the first prose writers, irrespective of gender, to declare they were specifically devoted to specializing in prose writing rather than opting for the poetry characteristic of the Romantic period.

=== Literary Context of Zhukova's Work ===
Although the publication of Russian literature written by women was highly irregular and the translation of it is still severely limited, women's literature as a genre in Russia still followed distinct conceptual threads where, within limited periods of time, women writers would respond, challenge, or 'echo' the work of their predecessors. Zhukova herself took part in the literary tradition of the 'society tale' which was common in women's writing at the time and descended from the 'provincial tale'. Zhukova wrote with more practicality than previous writers of the Romantic period where her characters avoided the melodrama so common among female characters in 19th century literature, and instead opted for more sociological characteristics. Zhukova was writing out of financial necessity, and therefore wrote palatable characters and stories. While she was concerned with the precision and depth of her characters, she also wrote in a way that would accommodate public taste. This resulted in Zhukova's stories taking a more critical look at systems and customs surrounding the family unit and the domestic sphere, rather than greater societal and institutional structures. Although Zhukova was concerned with how marketable her stories were, this does not mean they were not critical or expository. For instance, works like Baron Reichman take a critical stance on heterosexual love, relationships, and the nuances of the extramarital relations of women in patriarchal society. Questions about honour, heterosexual love, and of the differences between an 'innocent' and an 'experienced' woman subtly shine through Zhukova's work. While Zhukova does not appear to be a revolutionary and seemingly did not consider herself a literary pioneer, the method and reasoning behind her writing was unique and progressive within the context in which she was writing. Where other female authors might have embodied the 'tortured' or 'feverish' creative, Zhukova represented the 'productive' writer, a position that was somewhat unprecedented for women at the time.

== Works ==
- Evenings on the Karpovka (1838–1839). Short stories.
- Sketches of Southern France and Nice (1844). Travel accounts.
- A Summer Place on the Peterhof Road (1845). Novella.
