= Jacob Stepanovich Esipov =

- Died: 1805; St. Petersburg, Russia
- Occupations: Businessman, Inventor
- Years active: 1799–1805

Jacob Stepanovich Esipov (Russian: Яков Степанович Есипов; died 1805) was a Russian inventor. In 1799-1801 he developed a technology for obtaining sugar from sugar beets under industrial conditions in Russia.

== Commercialization ==
In November 1802, Esipov built the first beet sugar and alcohol distillery in Russia, in partnership with Yegor Ivanovich Blankennagel in the village of Alyabyevo (Russian: Алябьево) of Chernovsky County (Russian: Чернский уезд) of the Tula Governorate (Russian: Тульская губерния).

During 1802-1803 the factory produced 4.9 tons of raw sugar from beets harvested from 11 tithe of crops (1 tithe = 1.09 ha). The purity was approximately 85%. Waste sugar production (molasses, etc.) was processed into ethyl alcohol. In 1807, the sugar-refining department was added to the plant. For the first time in Russia Esipov introduced the purification of beet juice with lime. This method is still used.

In the fall of 1802 Esipov built a second, more advanced beet sugar plant in the village of Nikolskoe (Russian: Никольское). In 1803-1804, it produced raw and white sugar, alcohol, and liquor. Byproducts were used for animal feed. The yield of raw sugar from beet was 3.1% of the beet mass. He died in St. Petersburg, Russia.
