= Vierverlaten sugar factory =

Dutch company

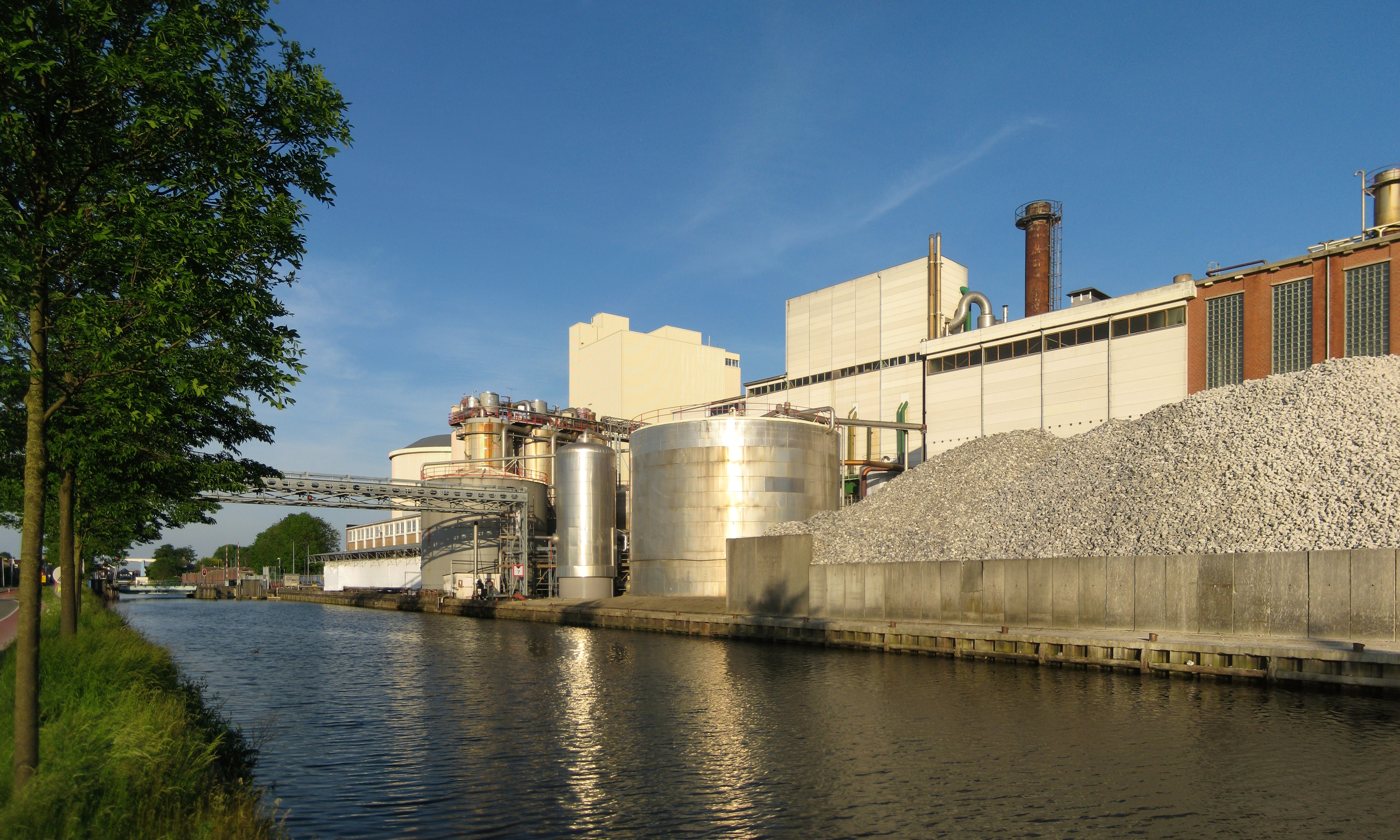
- The sugar factory in 2012
- Built: 1896
- Operated: Since 1897
- Location: Hoogkerk
- Coordinates: 53°12′51″N 6°29′50″E
- Industry: Sugar industry
- Owner: Cosun Beet Company

The Vierverlaten sugar factory is one of the two remaining beet sugar factories of the Netherlands. It is located in the hamlet Vierverlaten near Hoogkerk, in the municipality and province of Groningen, Netherlands. It mainly processes sugar beets to produce white sugar. The factory used to be part of the independent company Noord-Nederlandsche Beetwortelsuikerfabriek but later became part of the Centrale Suiker Maatschappij (CSM). Currently, it is a part of the cooperative Cosun Beet Company.

== Context ==
The Dutch beet sugar industry began to develop in the second half of the 19th century. In time, it began to process sugar beets from Frisia. The beets had to be transported by boat or rail. The costs of the transportation quickly added up, presenting an opportunity for the establishment of a local sugar factory that could acquire the beets at a lower price.

In the early 1890s, the Frisian Society for Agriculture (Friesche Genootschap van Landbouw) appointed a committee to investigate the possibility of founding a cooperative beet sugar factory. The committee concluded that such a factory would be advantageous for Frisian agriculture, but it also concluded that there were not enough farmers who were willing to invest.

A similar initiative for a cooperative sugar factory was started by the Groningen and Westerkwartier industrial societies. These societies performed several experiments showing that the soil in Groningen was suitable to sugar beet cultivation. However, a plan to establish a bank to finance the shares of the potential owners did not convince local farmers.

Some industrialists then took up the plan and founded the company Noord-Nederlandse Beetwortelsuikerfabriek in 1896.

== Foundation ==
=== The company ===
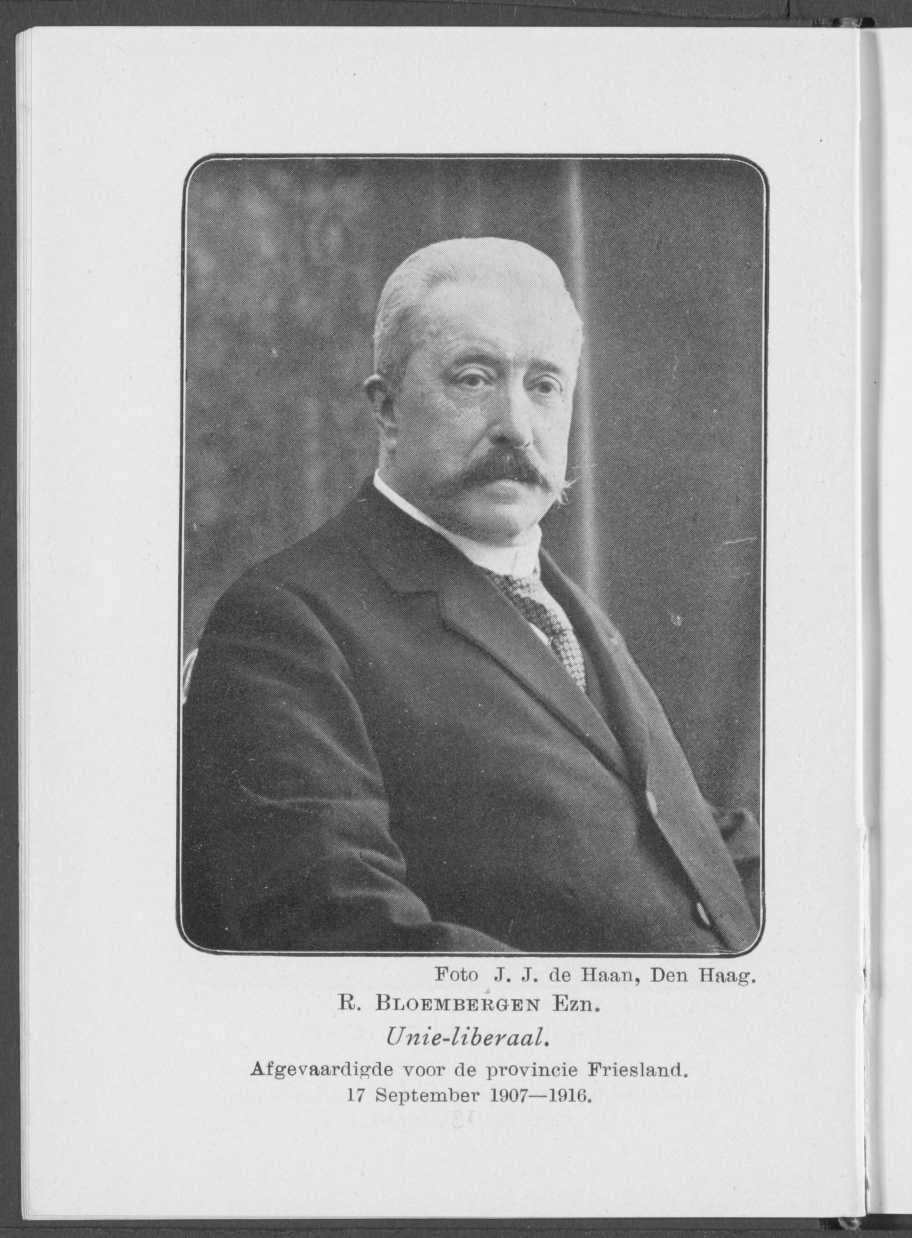
Reitze Bloembergen

The company Noord-Nederlandse Beetwortelsuikerfabriek was founded as a public company with a share capital of 1,000,000 guilders divided in 1,000 shares of 1,000 guilders each. A hundred shares would not be issued initially. The founders took 320 shares, and the rest was offered to the public. This occurred in Amsterdam, The Hague, Groningen, Friesland, and in the small Brabant towns of Roosendaal and Bergen op Zoom. Bergen op Zoom housed one of Paul Wittouck's factories. Roosendaal had two sugar factories.

The director of the company would be A. Springer, or L. de Ram. The supervisory board consisted of a selection of the Friesland and Groningen elite led by the very wealthy Jan Evert Scholten. Other members of the supervisory board were R. Bloembergen Ezn., F.E. Botma, J.L. Hilarides, Mr. D. van Houten, Ern. Laane, Lanmbert de Ram, F. de Ram, G. Reinders, Mr. W.J. van Welderen Baron Rengers. J.K. Rienks, D.K. Welt, and G. Zylma. Laane was a banker in Roosendaal, and the De Rams were sugar manufacturers from the south. Later on, Bloembergen was said to have been instrumental in founding the company together with his friend Scholten. In September 1896, O. Borchert became director. The other leaders were Secretary R. Bloembergen Ezn., A. van Rossum, and President-Commissaris J.E. Scholten.

While this company was owned by the shareholders, it was planned to operate on a participation system. During the campaign, the farmers would get advance payments based on the sugar price. Of the final profit, 45% would then be divided over the supplying farmers. The participation system would become very popular; however, initially many farmers opted to simply sell their beet for a somewhat higher price instead of relying on total amount of sales to determine their payout.

=== Terrain ===
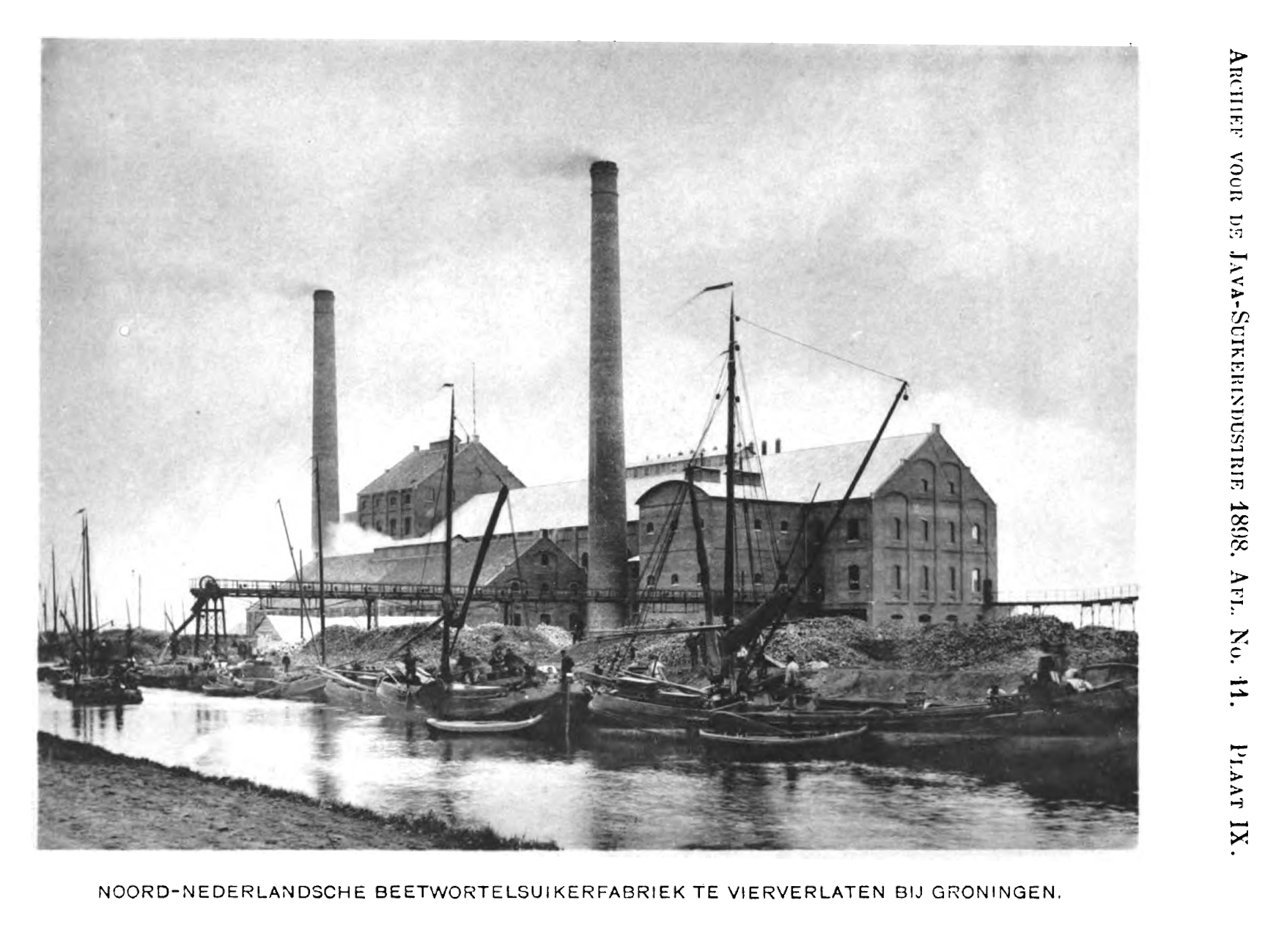
Plate IX: the pulp transporter in action along the Hoendiep

A terrain for the new sugar factory was found at Vierverlaten, a small hamlet just west of Hoogkerk, which was itself about 5 km west of Groningen. Vierverlaten was named for a lock in the Hoendiep, a canal which connected Vierverlaten to Groningen and Leeuwarden. The Aduarderdiep connected Vierverlaten to the north of Groningen and north-east Friesland. The Peizerdiep was also navigable but was primarily used as a supply of clean water from the sandy grounds of Drenthe. Vierverlaten was on the Harlingen–Nieuweschans railway, which served as an important hub for supply of coal.

The terrain was shaped like a triangle, with one long side bordering the Hoendiep (see Plate IX). Here boats could moor over a length of 500 m. All along the Hoendiep, channels were dug in which offloaded beets would be flushed towards the factory. There was also an automated beet pulp transporter that efficiently loaded beet pulp back into the boats. All along the quay, the Hoendiep was widened by six meters to support these processes.

The short side of the triangle was partly taken by a specially constructed port of 80 m × 25 m. This allowed for more controlled loading and offloading near the main factory building. The other long side of the terrain bordered the railroad. A private branch allowed railroad goods to be delivered to where they were needed.

=== Factory ===
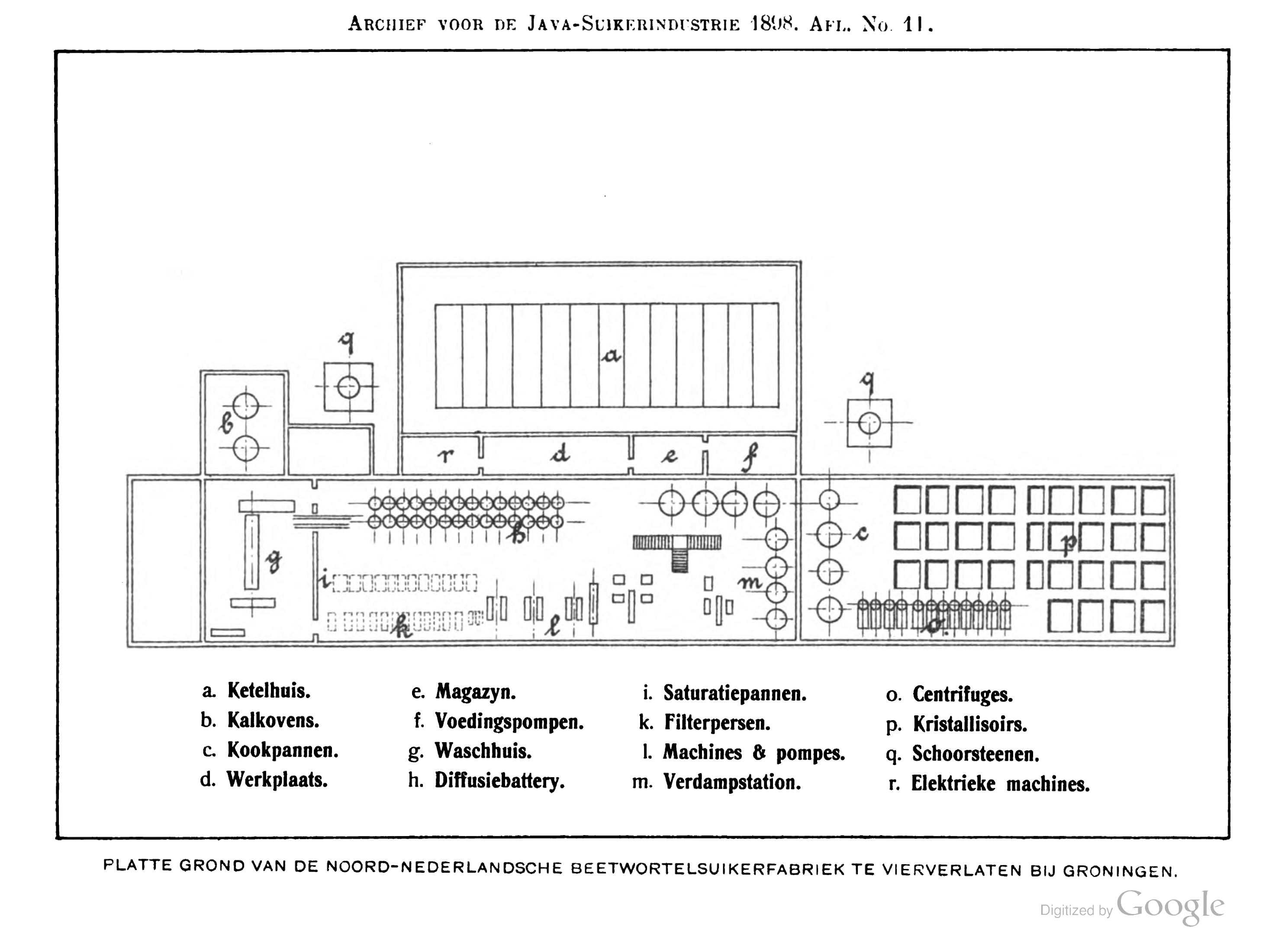
Floor plan of the factory

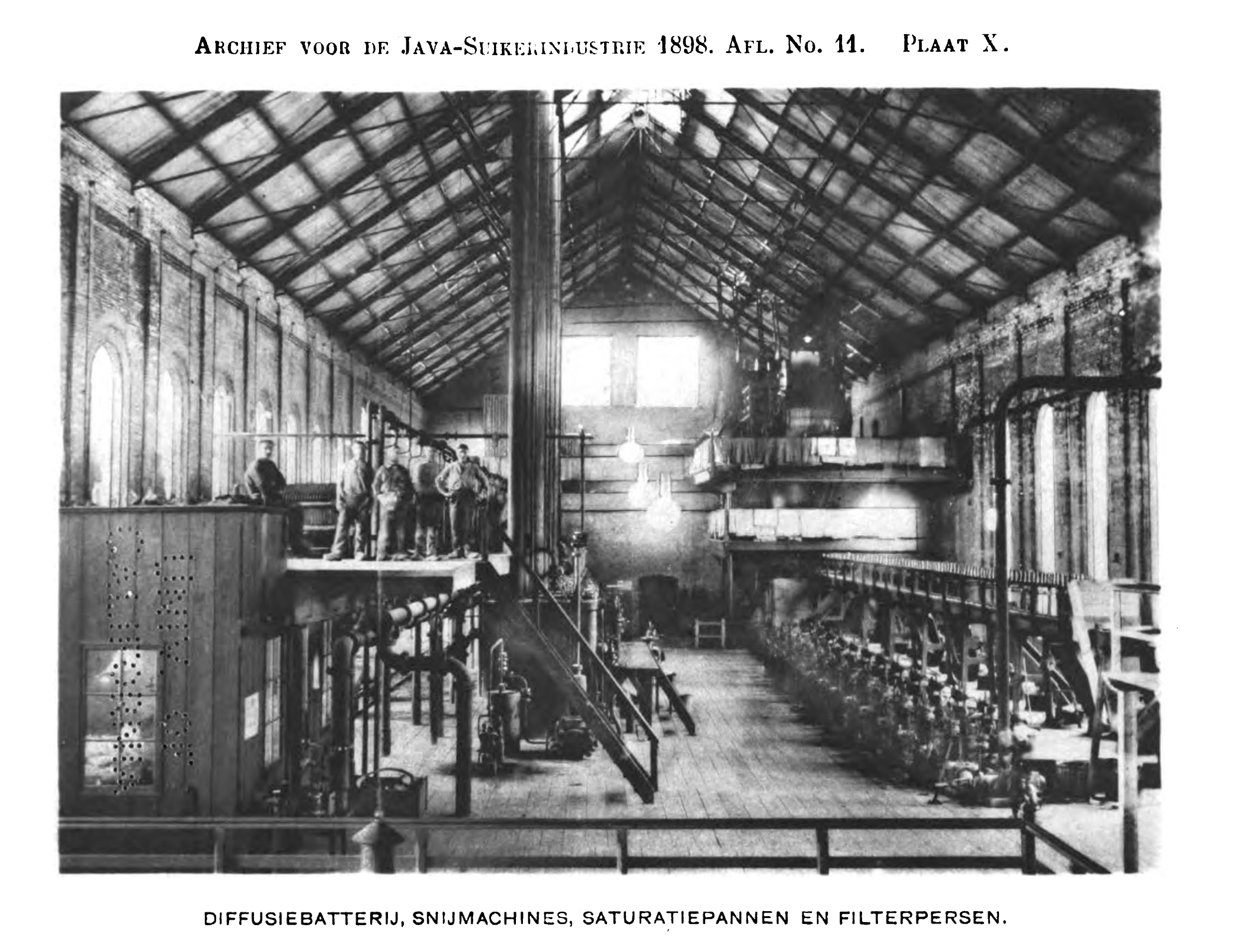
Plate X: the diffusers c. 1898

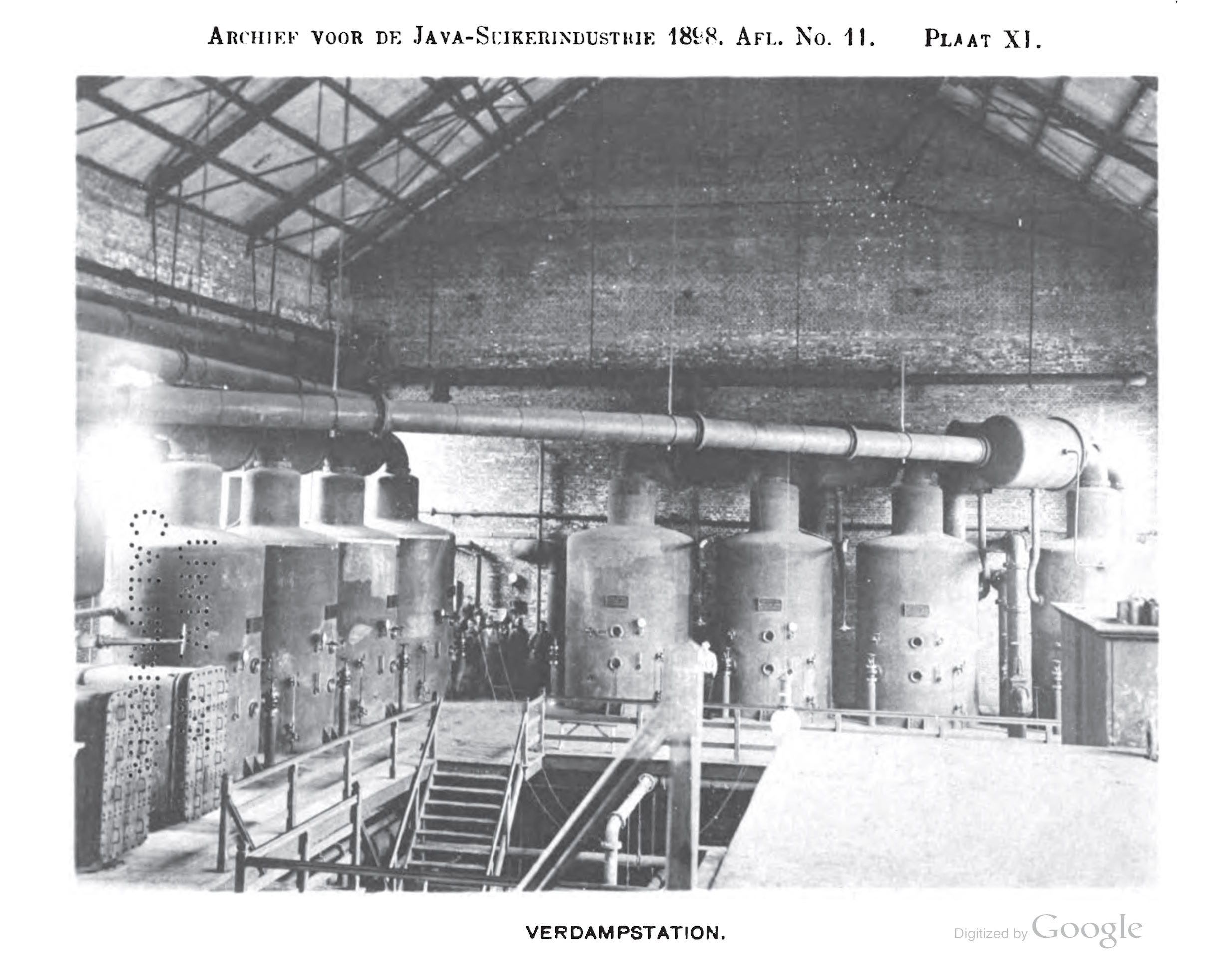
Plate XI: the two quadruple effect evaporators, c. 1898

The factory was built by Braunschweigische Maschinenbauanstalt. It required 2,500 piles for a solid foundation. Work started in September 1896, and it continued during the night. On October 1st, 1897, the factory became operational. The total cost to establish the sugar factory with its terrains, railroads, and harbor came to 1,200,000 guilders.

The sugar factory had been sized to find an optimal balance between economies of scale and what could be produced and sold. This resulted in a projected processing capacity of 1,000t of beet per day. The main building was 130 m long, 22 m wide, and 23 m high, which allowed plenty of space between the machines.

As the sugar beets were flushed to the factory through channels, some attached soil was removed. The machine that washed the remaining dirt off the beets was on the western side of the factory. The dirty water leftover from the washing process was moved to settling basins, where the pollutants settled down.

The beets were then moved up to the highest point in the factory. They were weighed and thrown into three slicing machines. From the slicing machines, the slices, or cossettes, went to the diffusion battery of 28 boilers, each of which had 6,500 liters capacity. The dried-out cossettes were then removed from the boilers from the bottom. From there, they were transported to 14 pulp presses, which were one level above the washing station. The beet pulp was then transported to the boats by the 64 meter-long beet pulp transporter (see Plate X).

From the diffusion boilers, the juices were pumped to the station for dry separation. From there, the juice went to five big boilers for the first saturation, which used carbon dioxide. The juice was then moved to eight presses. These steps were then repeated in the second saturation. In a third saturation, sulfurous acid was used next to carbon dioxide. Plate X shows the slicing machines, scales, and diffusers on the right. On the left are the saturation pans and the filter presses placed higher up.

The factory had two quadruple-effect evaporators (see Plate XI). With 2,200 m^{2} of heated surface, these turned the thin juice into thick juice.

The third main part of the factory was called the sugar house (suikerhuis). The thick juice was pumped up through the filter tower until it reached the pans of the fourth saturation. Here it was treated with carbon dioxide and sulfurous acid. About 3 meters below these were the wellblech filters. Below these were three big vacuum boilers, according to the Greiner system. These steps resulted in sugar crystals.

One floor lower, there were six open maischen. One floor further below, the sugar crystals entered the centrifuges. These were of the largest kind, with a diameter of 1,000 mm. The centrifuges were unloaded from below. An elevator then brought the sugar to the highest floors, which were used for storage. The syrup left in the centrifuges was processed in iron boxes, where it could crystallize further.

The factory was powered by thirteen Cornwall boilers, each with a heated surface of 100 m^{2} and a pressure of 7 atm. These provided the steam that put everything in motion. Two 45 m-high chimneys, with top openings of 2.5 m, were required for the exhaust. A large dynamo provided electricity during darkness, but a smaller one sufficed in daylight. Two ovens provided the lime needed for the process, as well as the carbon dioxide for the saturation.

== History ==
The company was originally founded as Noord-Nederlandsche Beetwortelsuikerfabriek. The first campaign started on 1 October 1897 and was finished before the end of November. It was a test campaign, which met with a lot of difficulties due to lack of experience. In anticipation of these initial difficulties, the factory had not contracted for many beets. During the first campaign, 30,000t of beet were processed. About two-thirds came from Friesland and one-third from Groningen. The beets were brought in small boats of 10–15 lasts (20–30t). Freight costs were 37,000 guilders. Labor cost for unloading, weighing, and general labor were 36,000 guilders.

The sugar market was and still is cyclical. This was reflected in the profits and dividends of the Noord-Nederlandsche. From 1897–98 to 1912–13, dividends were (in percentages): 2.5, 4.5, 5.5, 7, 4.5, 4.5, 3, 6, 10, 7, 6, 10, 10, 15, 15, and 10. The management of the company was rather stable. In June 1899, J.J. Reese replaced O. Borcherdt as director. In 1907, W.M. Gunning became director, and in September 1918 J.J. Granpré Molière was appointed.

During the first two decades of the 20th century, the factory complex expanded. In 1901, a large laboratory was built. In 1907, a barracks with 200 beds and facilities for temporary laborers was built. In 1912, another 380 m long harbor was dug along the railroad, but it did not give enough space for the barges to unload. A facility for drying beet pulp was constructed in 1913. In 1921, the boiler house was rebuilt.

By the early 1920s, the factory grounds allowed for storage of 20,000t of beet, 14,000t of coal, and 7,000t of lime. The unloading capacity at the factory was critical. At first, unloading was done by hand, but in time electrical and steam-powered cranes became operational. By the early 1920s, 2,700t of beet could be unloaded per day. In the 1921–22 campaign almost 140,000t of beet were processed.

The factory had a negative impact on the environment. In October 1906, pollution killed many of the fish in the Aduarderdiep. As the suffocating fish surfaced, most of it was caught by the local population. After repeated incidents, the municipality of Hoogkerk revised the permit for the factory. In the initial permit, it had stipulated that there would be four settling basins wherein waste would settle to the bottom. In May 1908, the municipality changed these conditions, as they were insufficient. W.M. Gunning, the recently appointed chief executive of the factory appealed this decision at the Council of State.

In 1911–1913, capacity reached 1,400t a day. In 1913, work started to increase the daily capacity of the factory to 2,500t of beet per day.

== Part of Wester Suikerraffinaderij ==
In early May 1918, it became known that the Amsterdam Sugar Refinery, Wester Suikerraffinaderij, had acquired a majority of the shares in the Noord-Nederlandsche Beetwortelsuikerfabriek. This meant that the company Noord-Nederlandsche Beetwortelsuikerfabriek became a daughter company of the Wester Suikerraffinaderij.

The shares had been bought at a price of 265% of the nominal value, i.e. 2,650 guilders per share. A competing offer of 290% by the Friesch Groningsche Coöperatieve Beetwortelsuikerfabriek had not been accepted. The Wester offered guarantees for the factory, employees, and management, but the Friesch Groningsche only offered guarantees for the employees and compensation for the management.

Starting in 1915, the Wester Suikerraffinaderij had acquired many sugar factories. The idea was to direct their production of raw sugar to its refinery in Amsterdam because many big cooperative sugar factories had recently been created there, some of which were starting to produce their own refined sugar. Had the deal from Friesch Groningsche been accepted, the Vierverlaten factory would have been used only to supply raw sugar to its own factory and refinery.

The large concentration of owned factories strengthened the position of the manufacturers in negotiations with farmers. Manufacturers were also able to limit production and to close down factories.

In 1918, the sugar factory in Lemelerveld was closed. The beets destined for this factory were instead processed in Vierverlaten, and its machinery was moved there as well.

== Centrale Suiker Maatschappij ==
=== Daughter company ===
In October 1919 the Centrale Suiker Maatschappij (CSM) was founded by NV Wester Suikerraffinaderij, NV Hollandia Hollandsche Fabriek van Melkproducten en Voedingsmiddelen, and Firma Van Loon en Co. In this new company, Wester Suikerraffinaderij received 6,600 shares, Hollandia 4,200, and Van Loon 1,200.

After Noord-Nederlandsche Beetwortelsuikerfabriek became part of CSM, the shares were still occasionally traded. This took place in 1925, 1927, 1929, 1930, 1931, 1935, and 1938. Prices were much lower than the 265% at which Wester had originally acquired the majority. In 1939, shareholders were offered to trade their shares for three shares CSM for a total nominal value of 900 guilders. This resulted in CSM getting nearly all the shares of the Noord-Nederlandsche.

=== Operations up to 1945 ===
CSM was one of the biggest companies of the Netherlands. In the north, it decided to cooperate with the Friesch Groningsche Coöperatieve Beetwortelsuikerfabriek. This culminated in the foundation of the Beetwortelsuikerfabriek Frisia in Franeker, a public company with 40 shares of 100,000 guilders each. The Friesch Groningsch got 20 shares, CSM 19, and CSM's daughter NV Noord-Nederlandsche Beetwortelsuikerfabriek 1 share.

Some profit, loss and dividend numbers
Year	Result	Dividend	Year	Result	Dividend
1909/10	301,112	10%	1931/32	1,464	0
1914/15	340,016	12%	1932/33	170,495	0
1919/20	1,207,237	5%	1933/34	134,894	0
1924/25	491,829	5%	1934/35	35,858	0
1925/26	320,539	5%	1935/36	42,876	0
1926/27	344,050	5%	1936/37	72,853	0
1927/28	236,217	5%	1937/38	91,665	0
1928/29	131,496	5%	1938/39	58,525	0
1929/30	-363,240	0	1939/40	239,581	7%
1930/31	-961,833	0	1940/41	219,569	6%

There were two major crises for the factory during the interwar period. The first was related to a sudden sharp drop in the sugar price. This dropped from 40.10 guilders in 1919 to 17.30 guilders in 1921. As a result, the number of cultivated beets dropped sharply in the next season. From the 1921–1923, the number of processed beets dropped from 139,900t to 64,600t. At the Friesch Groningsche, a similar drop in production from 260,083t to 117,438t occurred. Meanwhile, 66,298t of production went to the new Frisia factory.

The second crisis for the Noord-Nederlandsche was the Great Depression, which started in 1929. The 1929–30 campaign saw a loss of 369,893 guilders. Though this was high, the loss was still manageable. However, the loss over 1930–31 was catastrophic: In this singular campaign, very low prices of beets caused a third of the value of the company to be lost.

CSM got similar results, but was also entangled in foreign investments in Belgium, the United Kingdom, and Romania, causing the CSM to reorganize financially. In 1935, it wrote off 60% of its shares, meaning that the nominal value of each 1,000 guilder share was reduced to 300 guilders, and 100 guilders were paid back to the shareholder. That same year, it resumed paying dividend, but this was over the recapitalized stock.

Being a daughter company of CSM was not without risk. On 31 May 1932, other companies owed the Noord-Nederlandsche 298,719 guilders. By May 1939, the numbers on the balance sheet of the Noord-Nederlandsche Beetwortelsuikerfabriek were healthy. However, it was owed over one and a half million guilders by CSM, which caused economic tension.

A third problem was that many farmers on clay grounds switched to cultivating seed potatoes, which was more profitable. This severely limited the number of beets that were grown, especially in Frisia. New areas to profitably cultivate sugar beet were established on the former peat grounds.

=== Post World War II ===
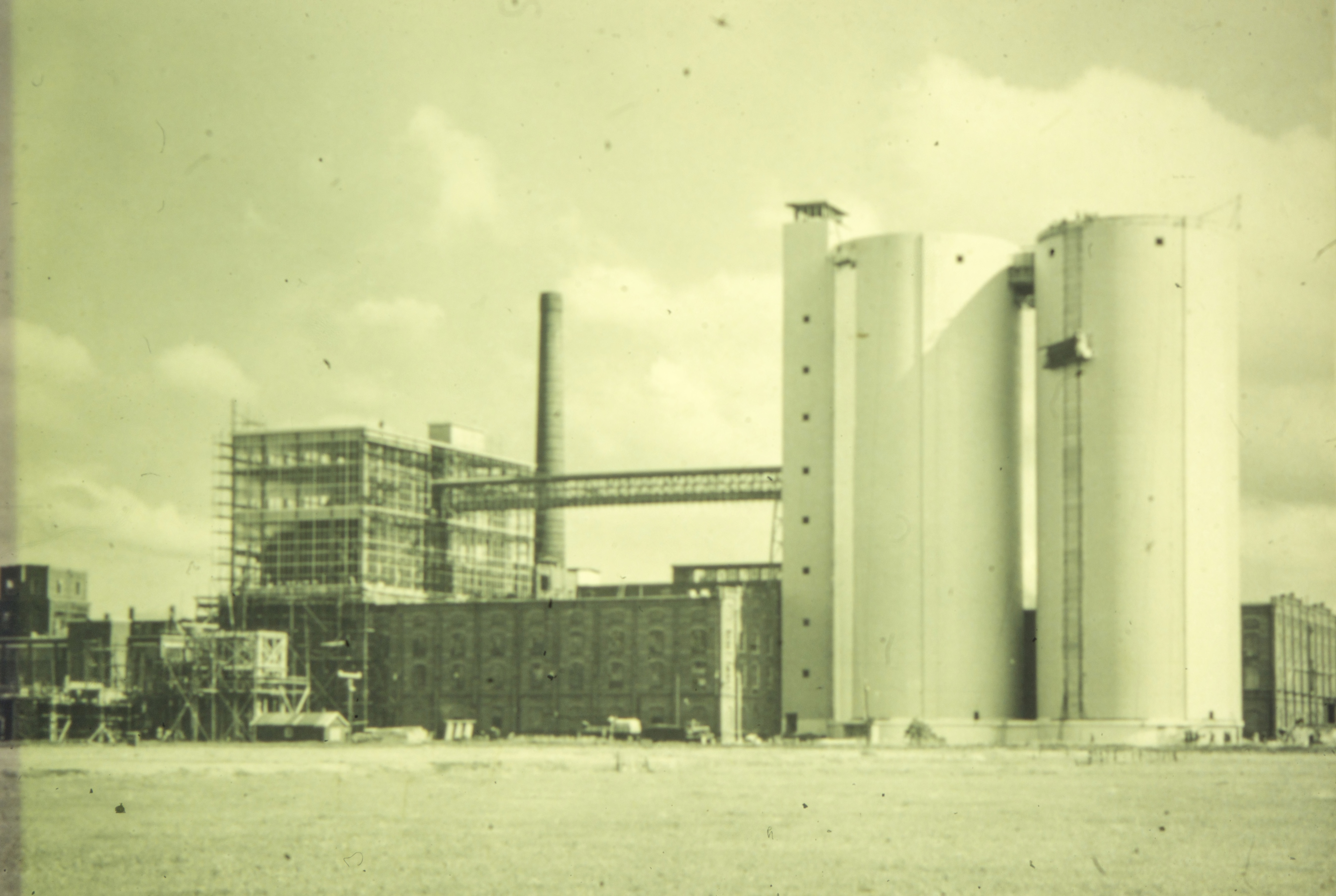
The tower diffusers and silos at Vierverlaten c. 1965

The reduced cultivation of sugar beet on clay grounds continued even after the end of World War II. This was compensated by new cultivation on the former peat grounds. At some time, the factory acquired the capability to refine raw sugar. In June 1951, the Danish MV Uraniënborg called at Delfzijl with 6,000t of Cuban raw sugar from sugarcane.

Starting in the 1960s, the West-European beet sugar production became regulated by the Common Market Organization for Sugar, which existed from 1968 to 2017. The CMO for beet sugar supported the European sugar production, but it also led to overproduction.

Processed beets
Year	Processed
1950–51	205,334t
1954–55	295,830t
1960–61	503,400t
1964–65	450,000t
1970–71	580,000t
1975–76	770,000t
1980–81	894,000t
1990–91	1,600,000t

During this period, the future of the Vierverlaten factory depended on transport costs for its location, which CSM had in invested earlier, and on its location relative to other factories. In the late 1960s, CSM closed its Amsterdam refinery and its factory in Sas van Gent, which was close to its factories in Breda and Steenbergen. In the 1970s, Oud Beijerland and Steenbergen were closed, leaving only its Breda sugar factory, Halfweg sugar factory, and Vierverlaten sugar factory.

In 1961, Vierverlaten got a tower diffuser made by Buckau-Wolf in Grevenbroich. This implemented a continuous diffusion process for 2,600t of the factory's daily production. In 1964, a second tower-diffuser was taken into use. At this point, only 15% of the beets were still diffused by the original diffuser batteries.

In 1965, two concrete sugar silos were completed. Each had a diameter of 32 m and a height of 46 m. The silos could hold 20,000t each. The silos were necessary for two reasons: The first was the closure of the Wester Suikerraffinaderij (sugar refinery) in Amsterdam, which meant that consumer products had to be instead made by the sugar factories. The other was the switch to 1 kg consumer packaging instead of delivering big sacks of sugar to retailers. In 1976, a third storage silo of the same height, but with a diameter of 40 m was completed. With a capacity of 40,000t, the new silo doubled storage capacity.

In 2005, the European Union decided on a drastic reform of the Common Market Organization for Sugar: subsidies were diminished, quotas were lowered, and sugar from sugarcane was given more access on the European market. Then in January 2005, CSM closed down its factory in Breda, leaving Vierverlaten as its only factory.

== Part of Cosun ==
In 2006 CSM sold its sugar division, and with it the Vierverlaten factory, to its only Dutch competitor, Cosun Beet Company. The move was inspired by the European Union's restructuring of the sugar market, which included subsidies for closing down factories. Only a year later, the European Union made further cuts in the Common Market Organization for Sugar, causing Cosun to close down its own Friesch-Groningensche factory, and keep the newly acquired Vierverlaten factory.

Cosun was successful in the new market order. In 2015 it expanded the factory so it could profit from the final cancelling of the European sugar quotas.

== Transport ==
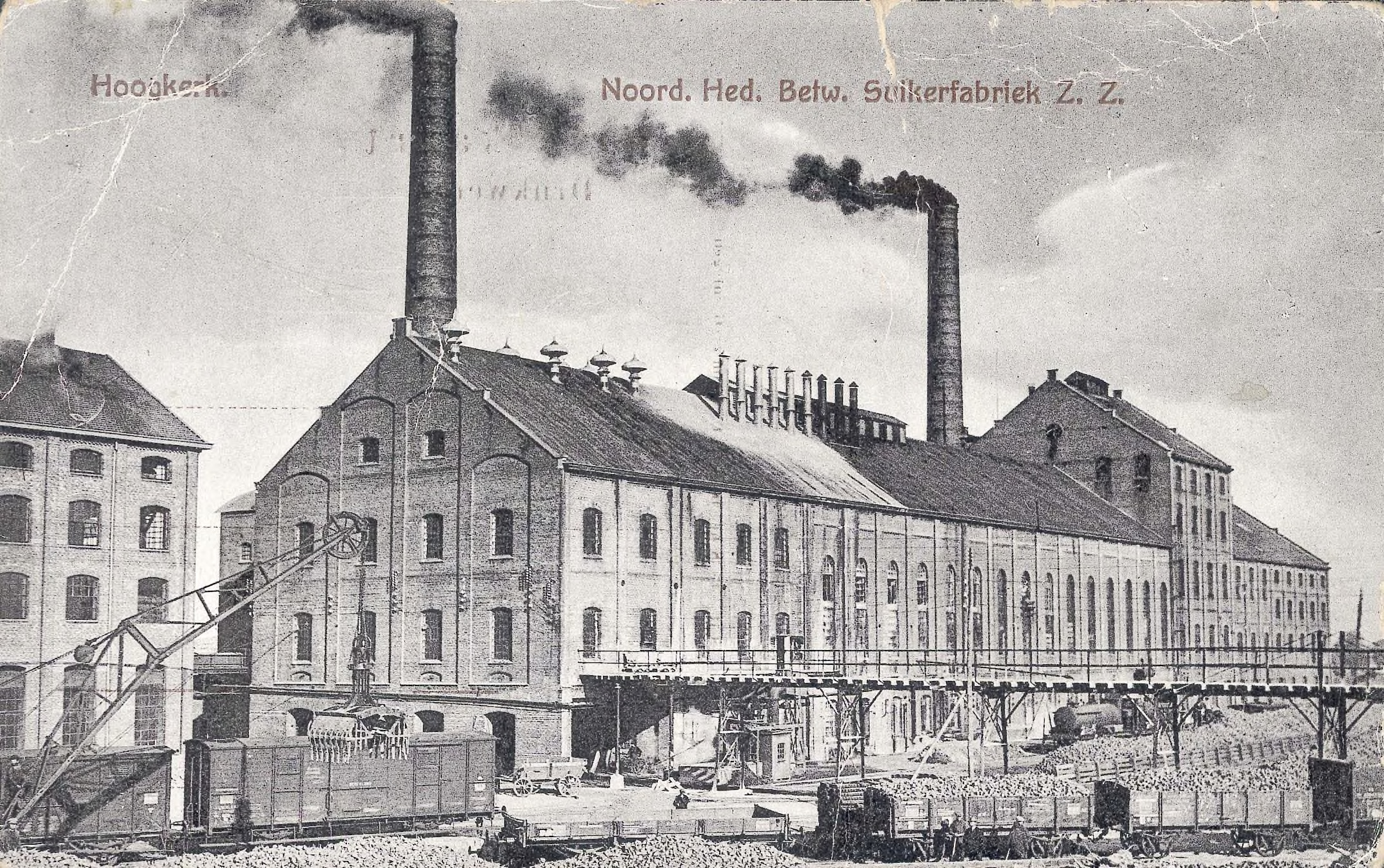
Freight cars at the factory

The Sugar Factory Vierverlaten is unique when it comes to transportation, for the beets could be transported by both water and by rail, as mentioned above. It is currently one of the few sugar factories that still receives part of its beets by water.

=== Rail ===
When the factory was founded, it was already possible to supply the sugar factory by rail. However, in general, transport over water was cheaper, primarily because waterways were much more fine-grained than railways. In most of the area served by the factory, it was possible to harvest beets, put them on carts, and load them onto a vessel. In contrast, the railways were far away from the fields, thus requiring a third transloading step to get the beets on a freight car.

In December 1921, all water transport were blocked by ice. The Vierverlaten factory tried to keep the factory going by bringing in sugar beet by rail. However, at the time, rail transport simply did not have enough capacity to feed the factories in Vierverlaten and Groningen, causing the latter to halt its campaign on 6 December.

By 1960, only 2% of the beets for Vierverlaten were brought in by rail.

=== Barge ===
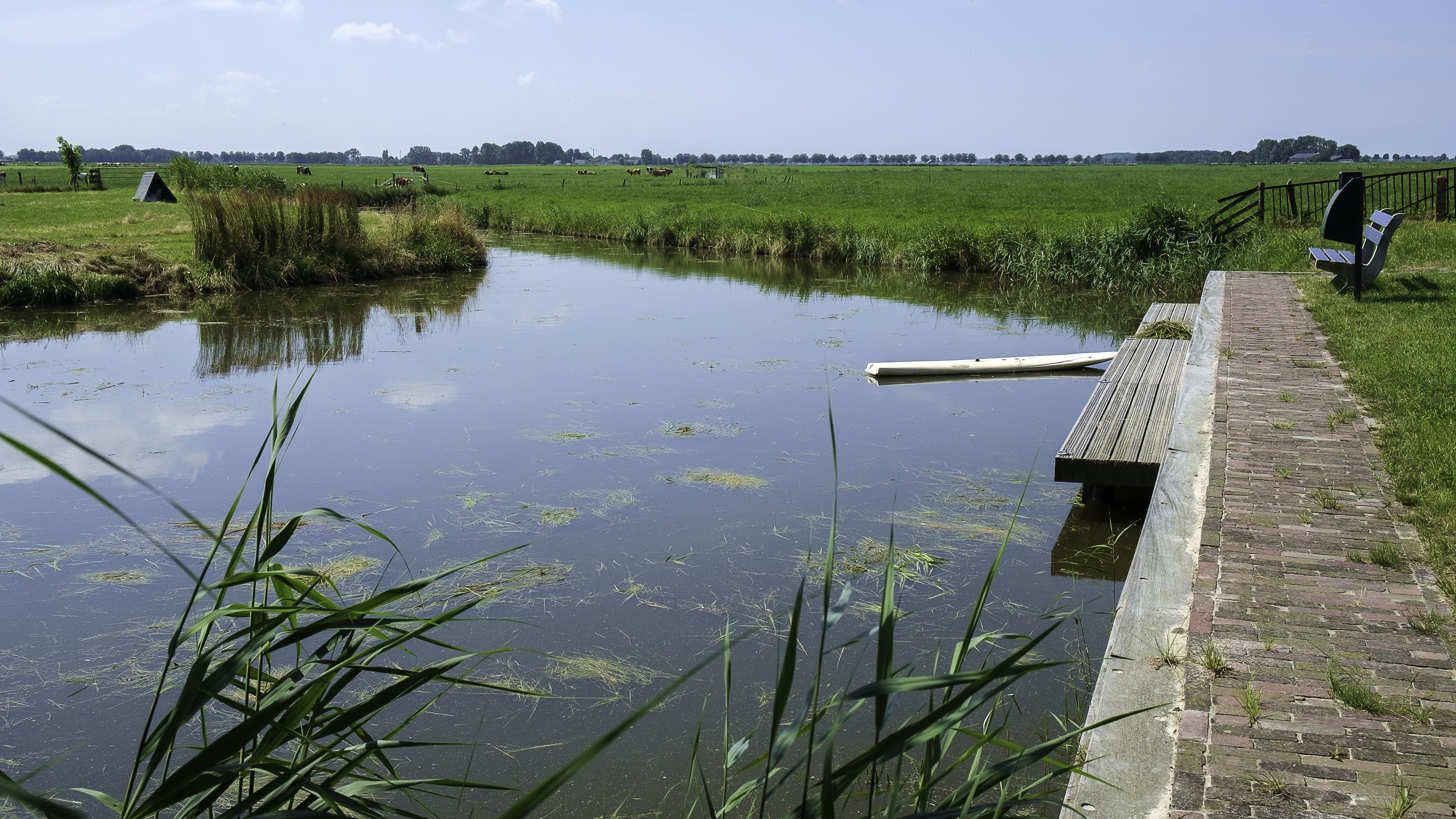
Tiny harbor of Stitswerd

The December 1921 news about the Friesch Groningsche halting its campaign noted that 400 beet skippers, 100 beet weighers, and 200 bietenvletters would be out of a job. The skippers were professional inland (or near-land) sailors who commanded a barge, a freight vessel for inland navigation. It typically had a single mast (though sometimes two) and, later on, an engine. In Dutch this was colloquially called a schip, but the full term is binnenschip, or (sailing) barge.

The barge skippers previously sailed a network of waterways that was more fine-grained than the current one. It was in 1970 that the small harbor of Minnertsga saw its last use for shipping beets. Today, Minnertsga is not located on an official canal.

Meanwhile, the main Dutch inland waterways were continuously made deeper and wider. In the late 1930s a project was started to canalize the Aduarderdiep between Vierverlaten and the Van Starkenborgh Canal. This plan to make the Aduarderdiep usable for motorized barges of up to 1,000t was only completed by about 1956.

After the Puttershoek sugar factory was closed down in 2004, Vierverlaten became the only sugar factory in the Netherlands that still received a number of beets by barge, specifically those coming from the island of Texel, which are shipped from Oudeschild and unloaded directly onto the factory grounds. Limestone is also still transported to the factory by barge. Later on, Dinteloord sugar factory also started to get sugar beet from South Limburg by barge.

=== Dumb barge (bietenvletters) ===
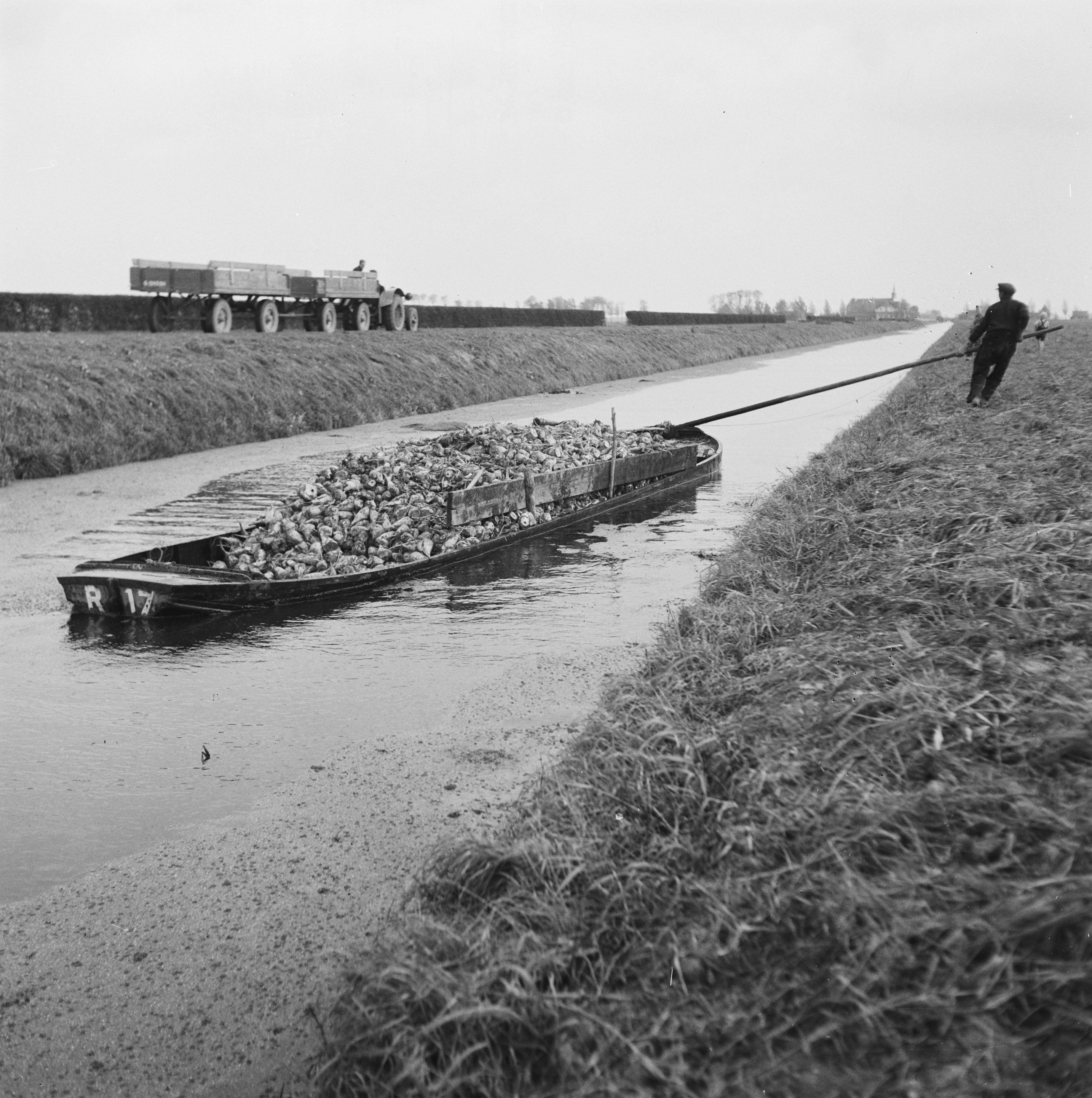
A pram carrying beets (1945)

Bietenvletters provided water transport over very small waters. Though a vlet is a small boat with a shallow draught, in this case, 'vletter' comes from a verb which means: 'to transport over a short distance'. These bietenvletters were not professional sailors, but simple laborers who rented a boat to transport beets. This was called a pram, which is a barge without its own means of propulsion. The pram allowed transport over water along canals that were too small for the barges that covered longer distances.

In the 1930s, a Mr. Zwerver seasonally worked at a brick factory. During the off-season, he was a bietenvletter. During the sugar campaigns, he rented a praam at café Bulthuis in Eenrum. This pram had no sail but did have cabins where the family lived during the campaign. After loading beets, Mr. Zwerver personally towed this pram from locations north of Warffum to Onderdendam while his wife was at the tiller. From Onderdendam, a steam tugboat would then pull 5–10 of these vessels to Groningen. As most of these bietenvletters were out of a job after the campaign, they always tried to maximize the number of freights they could do before the campaign closed.

=== Road ===
By October 1947, the majority of sugar beets for the factory were still transported over water. A small amount of the beet imports was transported by the railways. Those transported by road was negligible in comparison to the two other methods. In 1956, the number of beets brought to Vierverlaten by trucks surpassed the amount brought in by maritime transport for the first time. By 1960, this amount transported by truck had grown to 60% and, by the early 1970s, had hit 80%. In 1972, the unloading process for trucks was made more efficient by using a bridge that tilted the lorries to 42 degrees. This enabled their load to simply fall out onto the factory grounds, creating a very short turnaround time.

By 2004, road transport had become more common. In that year, much of the 4,500,000t of beets that the two remaining Dutch sugar factories processed was transported by road. However, this is now perceived as a problem, because the huge number of vehicles involved causes congestion and pollutes the environment.
