= Cosun Beet Company =

Dutch sugar company

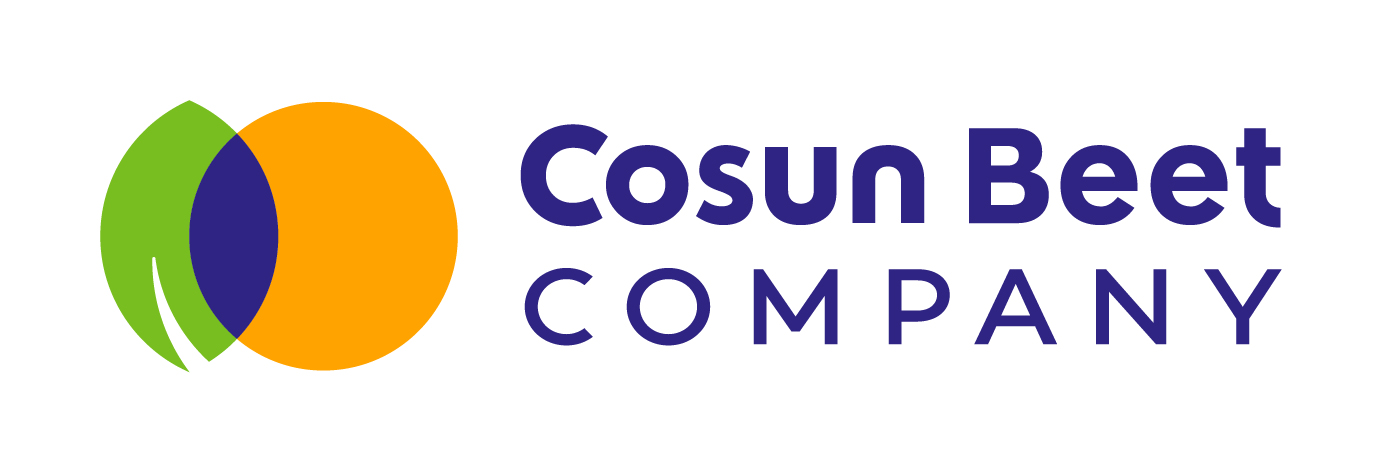

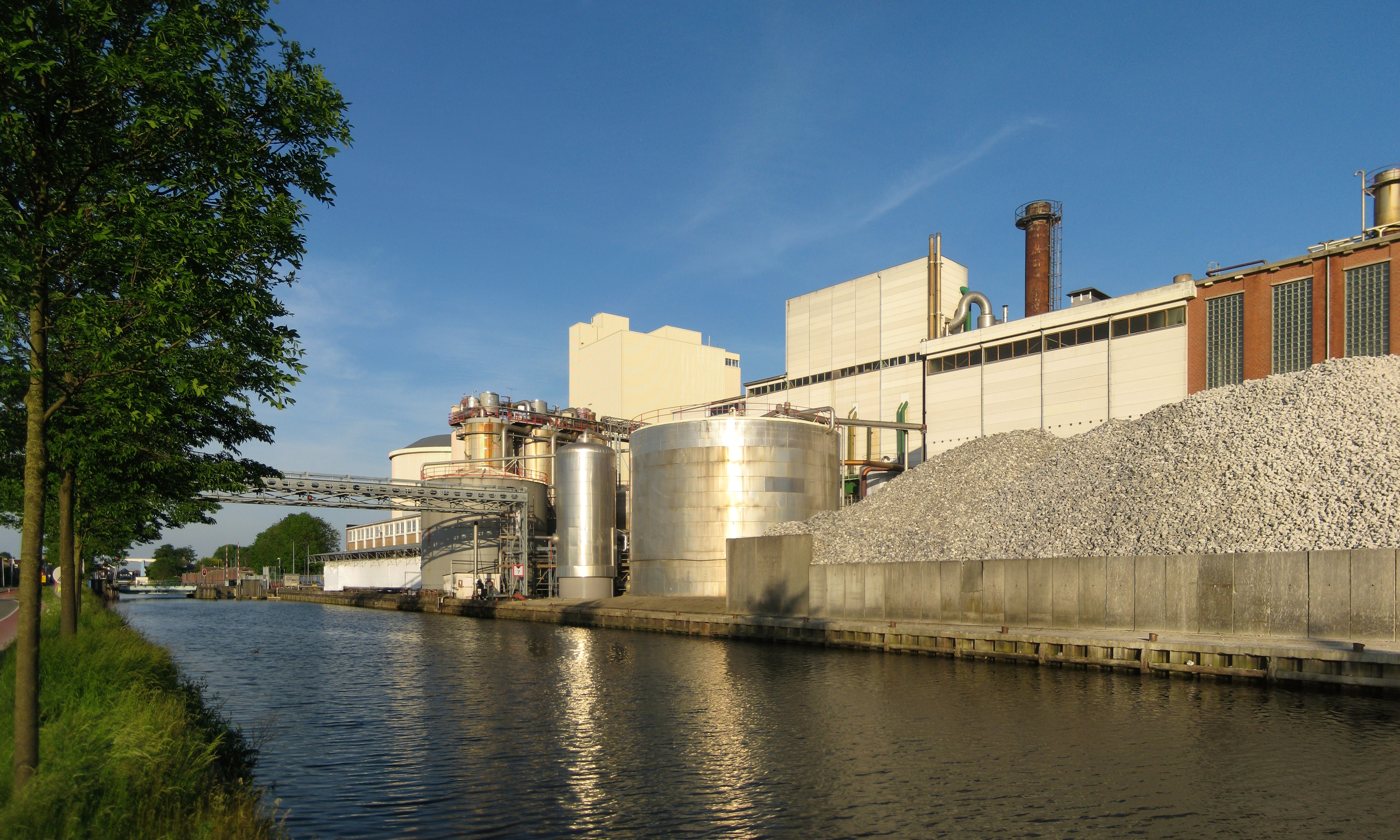
- Cosun Beet Company's sugar factory in Hoogkerk
- Industry: Sugar production
- Founded: 1928
- Headquarters: Breda, Netherlands
- Products: White sugar

Cosun Beet Company (before 2020 Suiker Unie) is a part of Royal Cosun. It produces white sugar and other refined sugar products. By acquiring the beet sugar division of Corbion in 2007 and Danisco Sugar GmbH in 2008, Cosun Beet Company became one of the five biggest European producers of sugar from sugar beet.

== Background ==
=== The rise of the cooperatives ===
Cosun Beet Company originates from a cooperative created by sugar beet farmers. In the Netherlands, the first beet sugar factory was opened in Zevenbergen in 1858. In general, a sugar factory would deliver the seed for the beets to the farmer and pay a fixed price per kilogram of beets delivered to the factory. As plant breeding resulted in steadily smaller beet with a higher sugar content, this went against the interests of the farmers.

Agriculture traditionally has many cooperatives. For sugar beet farmers, cooperatives were important to buy artificial fertilizers, but above all to create a more level playing field in their dealings with beet sugar factories. These had organized themselves to eliminate competition. In 1874 they e.g. determined and advertised that they would not pay more than 10 guilders for a tonne of sugar beet. In 1885 the factory cartel eliminated all competition by making arrangement to give each factory a fixed part of the sugar beet harvest.

It nevertheless took quite some time to found the first cooperative beet sugar factory. The Eerste Nederlandsche Coöperatieve Beetwortelsuikerfabriek in Sas van Gent opened in 1900. By 1916, there were seven cooperative beet sugar factories:

- Eerste Nederlandsche Coöperatieve Beetwortelsuikerfabriek (ENCBS) in Sas van Gent opened 1900, closed in 1989
- Dinteloord sugar factory, founded 1908, still active in 2023
- Puttershoek sugar factory, founded 1913 closed in 2004
- Friesch-Groningsche Coöperatieve Beetwortelsuikerfabriek in Groningen, founded 1914 closed in 2008
- Coöperatieve Suikerfabriek Zevenbergen founded 1913 closed in 1987
- Coöperatieve Beetwortelsuikerfabriek Roosendaal, bought from De Ram & Co., closed in 1997
- Sugar Factory Zeeland in Bergen op Zoom bought from Wittouck in 1916, closed in 1929

Later on, other cooperative sugar factories would be opened.

=== Concentration ===
The success of the cooperative sugar factories was one of the reasons that the public and private companies in the sugar industry started to concentrate. The increasing cost of investments was another reason. In 1919 most of the non-cooperative sugar industry merged to found Centrale Suiker Maatschappij (CSM).

The cooperative sugar factories understood that they also had to increase their scale of operations. In July 1928 the Coöperatieve Suikerfabriek Zevenbergen and the Dinteloord Sugar Factory entered into a partnership. In 1930 the Zeeland Sugar Factory in Bergen op Zoom was bought by competitor CSM and closed down. In 1947 the partnership in Dinteloord and the Roosendaal cooperative decided to merge and form the Verenigde Coöperatieve Suikerfabrieken (VCS) with head office in Dinteloord. The merger would allow the factory in Roosendaal to be closed down. This eliminated some overcapacity and the need for investments amounting to 2,000,000 guilders.

== History ==
=== Foundation of Suiker Unie ===
Suiker Unie logo

In 1966 the super cooperative Suiker Unie was formed. This was a cooperative of the cooperatives: VCS, Puttershoek sugar factory, Friesch-Groningsche Coöperatieve Beetwortelsuikerfabriek and ENCBS. Suiker Unie aimed to coordinate production. The foundation of Suiker Unie was also induced by the foundation of the Common Market Organization for Sugar (a.k.a. EU sugar quota system), which would start in 1968. At the time these four cooperatives had 6 sugar factories and processed 63% of Dutch sugar beets.

Sugar production is very sensible to economies of scale. Transport cost and transport time tended to eliminate these economies. Even in the Netherlands, with its fine-grained water transport network, this put a practical limit on the size of sugar factories. As road networks improved, it was no longer necessary to be close to the sugar beet farms, and it became more rational to work with a few larger factories. In 1987 Suiker Unie closed down its factory in Zevenbergen. At the time this even processed beet from the new polders in the IJsselmeer. In 1989, the ENCBS in Sas van Gent was closed. In 1997, the sugar factory in Roosendaal was closed. In 2004 the sugar factory in Puttershoek was closed down. Storage and distribution activities of Suiker Unie continued in Puttershoek. After that, the remaining factories were:

- Sugar factory Dinteloord
- Friesch-Groningsche Coöperatieve Beetwortelsuikerfabriek in Groningen

=== Acquisition of the Centrale Suiker Maatschappij (CSM) ===
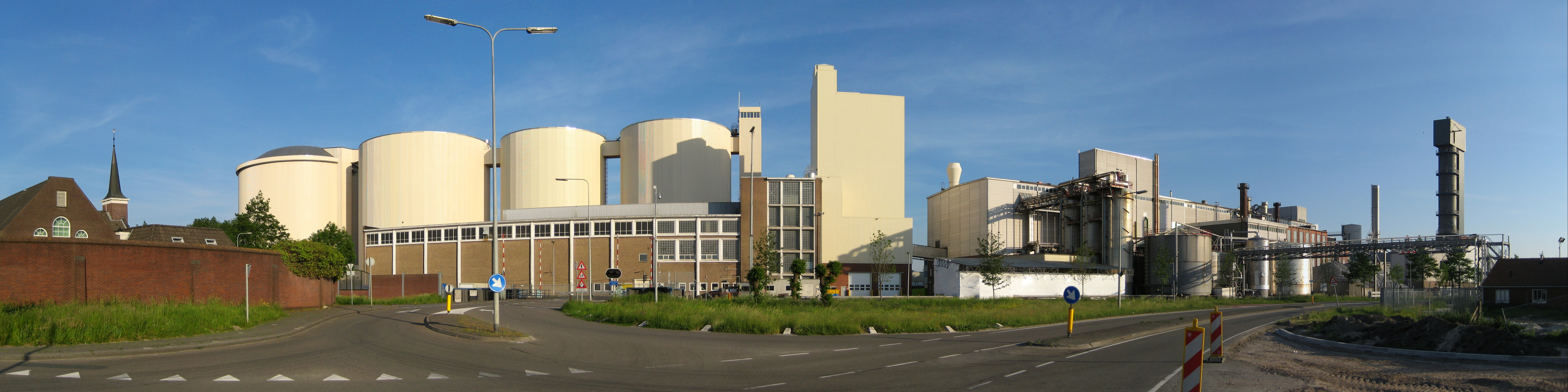
Vierverlaten sugar factory in Hoogkerk-Vierverlaten (2012)

In 2006 competitor CSM announced that it would sell its sugar division to Cosun, the company that owned Suiker Unie. At that time, this had 11,500 farmers growing sugar beet, and a market share of 5% in Europe. CSM brought with it its last remaining sugar factory in Vierverlaten, Hoogkerk, Groningen municipality, and a sugar works in Breda. The price for CSM's sugar activities was about 200 million euro. The move was triggered by the liberalization of the European sugar market, and the lowering of the guaranteed sugar price by 36%.

In 2008, the European Union then suddenly decided to limit beet sugar production in favor of more free trade in sugar from cane. It led Corbion to immediately close the Friesch-Groningsche Coöperatieve Beetwortelsuikerfabriek in Groningen city. The two sugar factories that were left by ultimo 2008 were:

- Sugar factory Dinteloord
- Vierverlaten sugar factory (ex-CSM)

In 2009 Cosun bought the sugar factory in Anklam, Germany with a quotum of 112,000 ton from Danisco Sugar. It was Suiker Unie's first foreign sugar factory. Anklam also produces bio ethanol.

In 2021 Cosun Beet Company became the sole owner of trading company Limako. Limako had been founded in 1968 by Suiker Unie (51%) and ED&F MAN (49%). Limako is a trader in beet sugar and raw cane sugar and facilitates refinement and logistics.

== Organization in 2023 ==
In 2023, Cosun beet company was organized thus:

- Head office in Dinteloord
- Sugar factory Dinteloord
- Vierverlaten sugar factory, Groningen
- Specialty factory Puttershoek
- Specialty factory Roosendaal
- Bio based Experts Dinteloord
- Innovation Center Dinteloord
- Green Protein Dinteloord
- Sugar factory Anklam, Germany
- Sales Office in Ferrara, Italy

== Sugar production and refining ==
Each year, Cosun Beet Company produces about a million tonnes of sugar. Byproducts are:

- Beet pulp
- Beet molasses
- Lime Cake (écume-chaux)
- Biogas

Cosun Beet Company has the trade mark Van Gilse for selling to Dutch consumers. Van Gilse products are e.g. sugar cubes (also from cane sugar) and beet sugar syrup. These sugar specialties are made in factories in Puttershoek and Roosendaal, originating from the former sugar factories in those places.

The steady liberalization of the sugar market also had a small advantage for Cosun Beet Company, which could then cheaply raw cane sugar. E.g. when in 2019 the growth of sugar beet had been delayed by bad weather, Cosun increased its processing of cane sugar. This way, the beet had more time to grow before they were harvested and Cosun still meet its obligations to deliver white sugar.

=== Results ===
The recent beet campaigns of Suiker Unie had the below results. The strong production growth in 2007 was due to the acquisition of CSM from Corbion. The sugar content of the beet varies because of the weather during growth. The extraction index shows that over 90% of the sugar content is recovered from the beet. The beet price is an average price and refers to so-called quotum beet with an average extraction index and sugar content. For 'surplus beet' prices paid to the farmers were generally lower. In 2010 this was € 30.44 per tonne. In 2007 the beet price seriously declined because of the new regulations which had been effective in 2006.

In 2017 there was a record harvest of sugar beet. This was also due to the end of the European Union Quota regulations in October 2017. In 2017 the yield per hectare was 15.5 tonne, or about € 4000 per ha for the farmer. In 2018 the beet suffered from draught and the harvest was much smaller. To make matters worse, the world sugar price hit a 10-year low in 2018.

Year	Beet processed (×1000 ton)	Sugar content of beet	Extraction (index)	Sugar production (×1000 ton)	Campaign (in days)	Quotum price beet (in € per tonne)	Yield per ha (in €)
2006	3468	16.4%	-	537	-	49.05	-
2007	5266	17.4%	91.1	853	-	41.31	-
2008	5200	17.2%	91.2	861	-	39.44	2902
2009	5730	17.7%	91.8	992	141	43.00	3252
2010	5273	16.8%	91.1	873	125	43.00	3082
2011	5845	17.0%	91.7	999	130	55.69	4038
2012	5772	17.1%	91.4	969	120	68.80	4871
2013	5734	16.8%	91.1	948	121	67.26	4917
2014	6866	16.7%	91.2	1125	135	50.18	4354
2015	4878	16.7%	90.9	790	99	43.01	3301
2016	5577	17.1%	90.9	934	109	44.15	3317
2017	8043	16.6%	90.9	1329	150	45.62	4007
2018	6556	17.4%	89.9	1103	120	35.59	2666
2019	6777	16.3%	89.6	1094	-	36.05	2930
2020	6840	16.1%	89.4	1089	-	35.58	2901
2021	6797	16.7%	90.7	1137	-	38.91	3129
