= Corbion =

Biochemicals manufacturer

Corbion N.V.
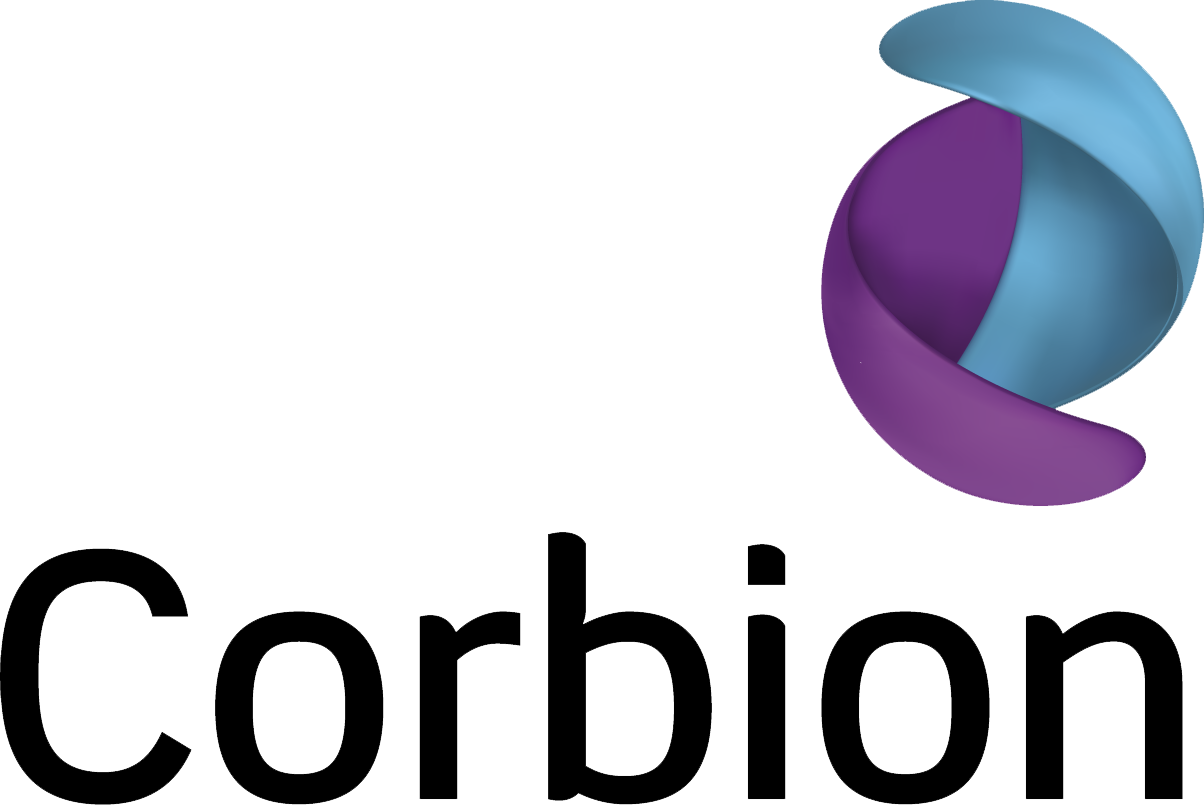
- Formerly: CSM N.V.
- Type: Public
- Traded as: Euronext Amsterdam: CRBN
- Industry: Food ingredients; Biochemicals
- Founded: August 21, 1919; 107 years ago
- Headquarters: Amsterdam, Netherlands
- Key people: Olivier Rigaud (CEO); Peter Kazius (CFO)
- Number of employees: 2,727 (2013)
- Website: corbion.com

Corbion N.V., formerly Centrale Suiker Maatschappij (CSM) N.V. (Central Sugar Company in English), is a Dutch food and biochemicals company headquartered in Amsterdam, Netherlands. It produces bioingredient-based foods, chemicals derived from organic acids, and lactic acid based solutions for the food, chemical and pharmaceutical industries. The company was founded on August 21, 1919.

== Centrale Suiker Maatschappij (CSM, 1919-2013) ==
=== Foundation ===
The Centrale Suiker Maatschappij n.v. (CSM) was founded in 1919 for the production and trade of all kinds of sugar. The company was founded on 24 September 1919 as a new holding in which the participants brought in their assets in exchange for shares. On foundation, there were 100 preference shares of 10,000 guilders each. The participating companies took 12,000 regular shares of 1,000 guilders as follows:

- NV Wester Suikerraffinaderij: 6,600 shares
- NV Hollandia Hollandsche Fabriek van Melkproducten en Voedingsmiddelen: 4,200 shares
- Firma Van Loon en Co; 1,200 shares

Notably people in the combination were:

- J.P. van Rossum and H. de Vries Robbé, directors of Wester Suikerraffinaderij
- J.M. Wagenaar Hummelinck and M.G. Wagenaar Hummelinck directors of Hollandia
- P. van Dusseldorp; P. van Ommeren banker; C.A. van Buuren van Heijst merchant; I.W. Opstelten; P. Lels shipping line owner; J.A.A.M. van Loon industrialist; I.M.A. van Loon engineer.

=== In business ===
In 1920 CSM was listed on the Amsterdam Stock Exchange. In capitalization it ranked just after Shell plc, Jurgens, Van den Bergh and Oliefabrieken Insulinde.

From the start business went downhill due to overproduction and falling prices. The merger included the 17 private sugar factories that remained from the 28 that still existed in 1910. By 1935, CSM consisted of:

- Wittouck beet sugar factory in Breda (closed in 2005–2008)
- Van Loon & Co sugar factory in Steenbergen (closed in 1979)
- The Halfweg sugar factory (large majority share, closed in 1991)
- Beetwortelsuikerfabriek Vierverlaten (still in use)
- Oud Beijerland Sugar Factory (closed 1972)
- Sas van Gent sugar factory (closed 1968)
- Wester Suikerraffinaderij, its only sugar refinery (closed 1965)

The parent companies of the new CSM continued to exist. In 1939, CSM and Wester Suiker still produced their own annual reports. After World War II this was known as Administratie Maatschappij Wester Suiker Raffinaderij N.V.

Post World War II, CSM saw very profitable years. From 1952 to 1960 it paid a dividend of 10% or more while it amassed big financial reserves. Later on, the sugar activities would gradually form an increasingly smaller share of total company revenue.

In mid-2006, CSM announced that it would sell its sugar operations to Royal Cosun, the parent company of Suiker Unie. Royal Cosun's daughter company Cosun Beet Company then became the only remaining sugar producer in the Netherlands. CSM Suiker then produced approximately 350,000 to 380,000 tons of sugar per year.

=== Food ===
From the mid-1970s, the company grew through acquisitions. In June 1978, CSM bought the food division of Koninklijke Scholten-Honig. In 1986 Verenigde Dropfabrieken was acquired. In 1990, Tonnema was bought.

In 2001, the Foods Division was sold, with well-known brands such as Hak, Honig and De Ruijter. In 2005, the Sweets Division was put on sale. With brands such as Venco, Red Band and Sportlife, some €750 million in sales at CSM disappeared.

=== Bakery products ===
Over the years, CSM increasingly focused on the market for the food and confectionery industry, with bakery products and food ingredients. The company was a major supplier to Europe and North America. A major acquisition was that of the bakery ingredient division of Unilever in 2000, for €670 million.

In February 2010, CSM announced the acquisition of Best Brands, one of the largest producers of bakery products in the United States. Best Brands achieved sales of $538 million in 2009. After the acquisition, CSM became the market leader in bakery products with a total annual turnover of more than $2.3 billion.

=== Lactic acid ===
In the late 1960s, the production of lactic acid from fermented sugar began. CSM was the market leader in lactic acid and lactic acid derivatives such as ingredients and supplements for shelf life extension of food, cosmetic products, solvents, biodegradable plastics, pharmaceuticals and medical applications.

== Corbion (2013) ==
=== CSM becomes Corbion ===
In early May 2012, the company had three divisions: CSM Bakery Supplies Europe, CSM Bakery Supplies North America and PURAC (lactic acid and lactic acid derivatives). CSM decided to sell its bakery activities and to focus on growth in the bio-ingredient divisions Purac and Caravan Ingredients. In March 2013, the sale of the bakery activities in Europe and North America to investment company Rhône Capital was announced, for more than €1 billion. Rhône also acquired the brand name CSM. The sale became final on July 3, 2013. CSM changed its name to Corbion. The new company was fully focused on the production of organic food ingredients and biochemicals.

=== Expanding in lactic acids ===
The lactic acid division built a lactide factory in Thailand that became operational at the end of 2011, costing €45 million. The lactide made from lactic acid is a raw material for polylactic acid and biodegradable bioplastics.

At the beginning of 2016, Corbion decided to build a PLA factory next to the existing factory in Thailand. Polylactic acid (PLA) is a bioplastic produced from biomass and biodegradables. Corbion then became the second provider in the market alongside the American company Natureworks. In November 2016 Corbion joined forces with Total to develop bioplastics by creating a 50/50 joint venture to produce and market polylactic (PLA) polymers called Total Corbion PLA. Total Corbion PLA announced the start-up of its 75,000 tons per year PLA (Poly Lactic Acid) bioplastics plant in Rayong, Thailand on 3 December 2018.

=== Algae ingredients ===
In 2017 Corbion acquired TerraVia (formerly Solazyme), a bioengineering chemical company with a broad and diverse platform centered on biodiesel, ingredients, and branded products derived from microalgae. It produces ingredients such as Omega-3 for animal nutrition and tailored oils, structured fats and proteins for food and biochemical applications. San Francisco-based TerraVia operates an R&D center in San Francisco, and two manufacturing facilities: one in the US and one in Brazil.

On 25 March 2019 Corbion acquired Granotec do Brazil to drive further expansion in food ingredients in Latin America.

== See also ==
- Droste
