= Hoogkerk =

- Village
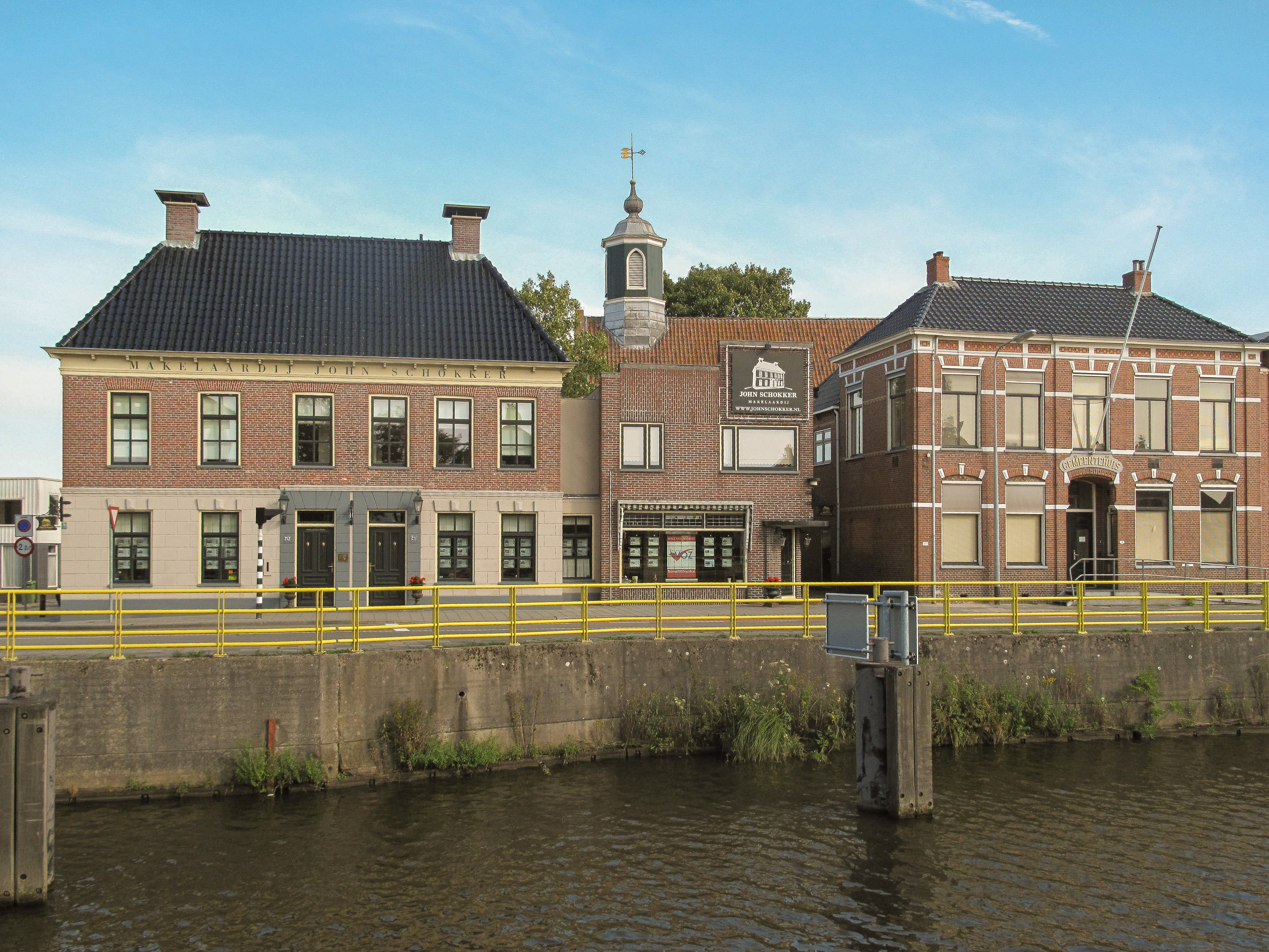
- Former townhall in the street

- Location of Hoogkerk in Groningen in the Netherlands Hoogkerk (Netherlands)
- Coordinates: 53°13′N 6°30′E
- Country: Netherlands
- Province: Groningen
- Municipality: Groningen

Population (2017)
  - Total: 12,260
- Time zone: UTC+1 (CET)
  - Summer (DST): UTC+2 (CEST)
- Postal code: 9744, 9745
- Dialing code: 050

Hoogkerk is a village in the Dutch province of Groningen. It is located in the municipality of Groningen, about 4 km west of the city.

== Geography ==
Hoogkerk is located on the crossroads of the inland waterway Hoendiep and the Harlingen–Nieuweschans railway. These both connect Groningen to Leeuwarden. Another historic asset is the Peizerdiep, which supplied fresh water. In the 1980s, the A7 motorway was built just south of Hoogkerk.

== History ==
Thanks to its location, Hoogkerk became an industrial center in the late 19th century. By 1960, there were two major industrial companies in Hoogkerk proper. Roelfsema's Oliefabrieken, later known as Calvé-Roelfsema was the oldest and was located just east of the village. It was active in cattle-fodder and used resources brought in by water. It closed down in the 1980s. In 1913, the cardboard factory De Halm was founded to the southeast of the village.

The hamlet Vierverlaten in the municipality of Hoogkerk also had two major companies. It 1896, it became home to the Vierverlaten sugar factory. The N.V. Chemische Fabrieken Smid en Hollander was active in the production of material for road construction. Shipyard Barkmeijer in Vierverlaten was a smaller company, but had a long history.

Hoogkerk was a separate municipality until 1969, when it was merged with the city of Groningen.
