= Halfweg sugar factory =

Dutch company

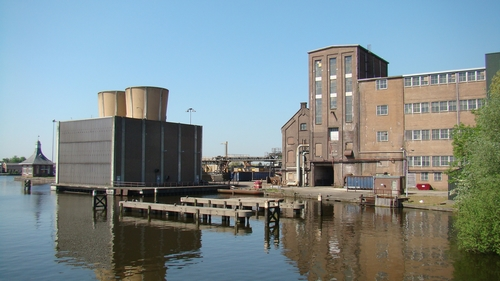
- The former CSM Sugar factory

- Location within North Holland
- Built: 1863
- Location: Halfweg, Haarlemmermeer
- Coordinates: 52°23′6.6″N 4°44′39.6″E
- Industry: Sugar industry
- Defunct: 1992 (factory)

The Halfweg sugar factory is a now defunct beet sugar factory previously known as "Suikerfabriek Holland". It closed down in 1992 and was then repurposed to become 'Sugar City', an area with offices, retail shops and an event venue. The terrain measures 11 hectares, and is hemmed in by the Haarlemmerstraatweg (N200), the Ringvaart of the Haarlemmermeer polder, and the wide part of the Ringvaart that leads to the sluices and the former Zijkanaal F (of the North Sea Canal). Halfweg village is on the other side of the wide part of the Ringvaart.

== Gemeenlandshuis Zwanenburg ==
The first development in the area took place in 1517, when a brick house was mentioned. In 1632 the canal Haarlemmertrekvaart was completed between Amsterdam and Haarlem. In the polders Houtrijk and Polanen, the canal was not continuous and passengers had to change boats. Here the settlement Halfweg, literally 'half way' formed.

In 1645–1648, the Gemeenlandshuis Zwanenburg, designed by Pieter Post was built. The location was chosen, because it was just west of a couple of sluices. These discharged from the Haarlemmermeer directly onto the IJ and prevented the brackish IJ water from entering the lake. The IJ reached up to this point till the construction of the North Sea Canal from 1865 to 1876.

In 1852, the Haarlemmermeer polder was made dry. The Hoogheemraadschap van Rijnland therefore decided to build a new steam pumping station for the sluices. This also meant that there was no more use for the already monumental Zwanenburg building, and plans were made to demolish it in 1859.

== Sugar factory Zwanenburg (1862–1881) ==
In April 1862 many were relieved to hear of the plans to create a sugar factory in the Gemeenlandshuis Zwanenburg. It happened to more or less meet the criteria for a sugar factory building: Sturdy enough and high enough to contain the required machinery and located on a navigable water. However, by itself the location at Zwanenburg also made sense. It was on the crossroads of many inland waterways, and these were extremely important to economically transport the relatively heavy sugar beet. It was also on the Amsterdam–Haarlem railway and on the Haarlemmerstraatweg, one of the first Dutch paved roads.

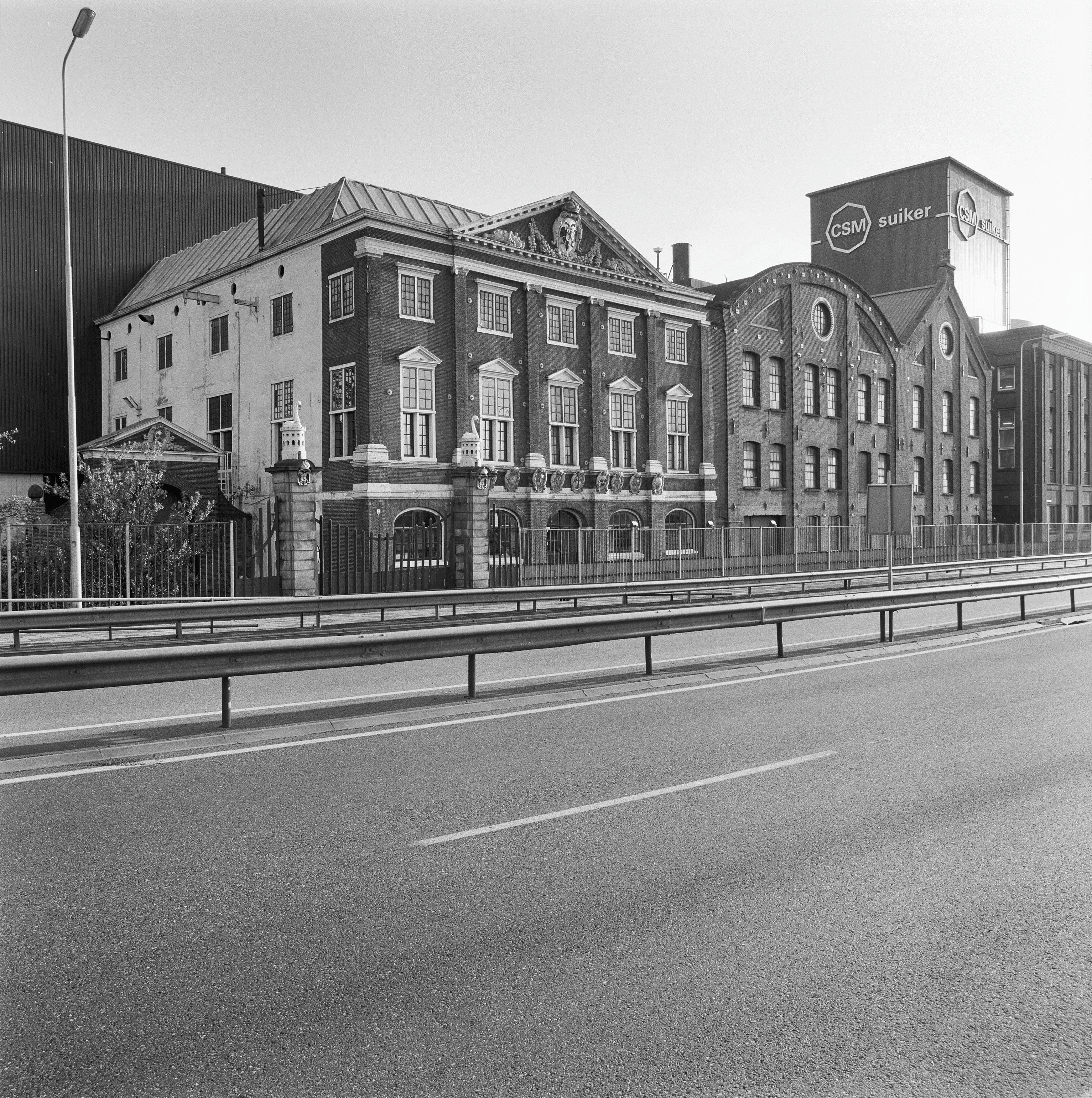
In 1986: Gemeenlandshuis Zwanenburg along the N200

On 30 January 1863 Bartholomeus Lans, living at Zwanenburg, formed the partnership Barth. Lans & Co. with himself as only managing partner. The capital of the partnership would be 400,000 guilders. Its goal was the foundation of a sugar factory and sugar distillery and other activities at Zwanenburg. The other partners were Abraham Dudok van Heel and Paul Cornelis van Vlissingen, but this was not advertised. These men were involved with Van Vlissingen en Dudok van Heel and wanted to have a nearby factory where they could test and experiment with machinery they were licensed to produce. In June 1863 Mr. de Zwaan Jr. and Mr. de Koper from Amsterdam got the order to change Zwanenburg to a sugar factory.

In January 1865 the public company "N.V. Beetwortelsuikerfabriek op den huize Zwanenburg" was founded to replace the Lans & Co, partnership. The new Naamloze vennootschap was funded by the previous partners transferring their assents. Now the role of Van Vlissingen en Dudok van Heel and its owners, manufacturers of sugar factory equipment, became public. Of the 350 1,000 guilder shares taken, 265 could be directly related to them, or their partners related to Société J. F. Cail & Cie.

The factory operated for quite some time, but was not making much money. One of the causes was that in the early years, the beet grown in the Haarlemmermeer polder contained much salt and were low in sugar. The factory therefore had to contract for sugar beet in Gelderland and North Brabant. In 1872 the shares were deprecated from 1,000 to 500 guilders. It was not enough, in 1876, the Zwanenburg shares again decreased sharply to about 10% of their new nominal value.

In January 1881 a group of large creditors took action to protects its interests. It led to an extraordinary shareholders meeting on 14 March, which agreed with the creditors, and then proposed to liquidate the company. For which a new meeting was called on 19 March 1881. The factory and other assets at Halfweg were then auctioned for 84,600 guilders in October 1881. Soon after, the company declared bankruptcy.

== Suikerfabriek Holland N.V. (1881–1920) ==
=== Foundation ===
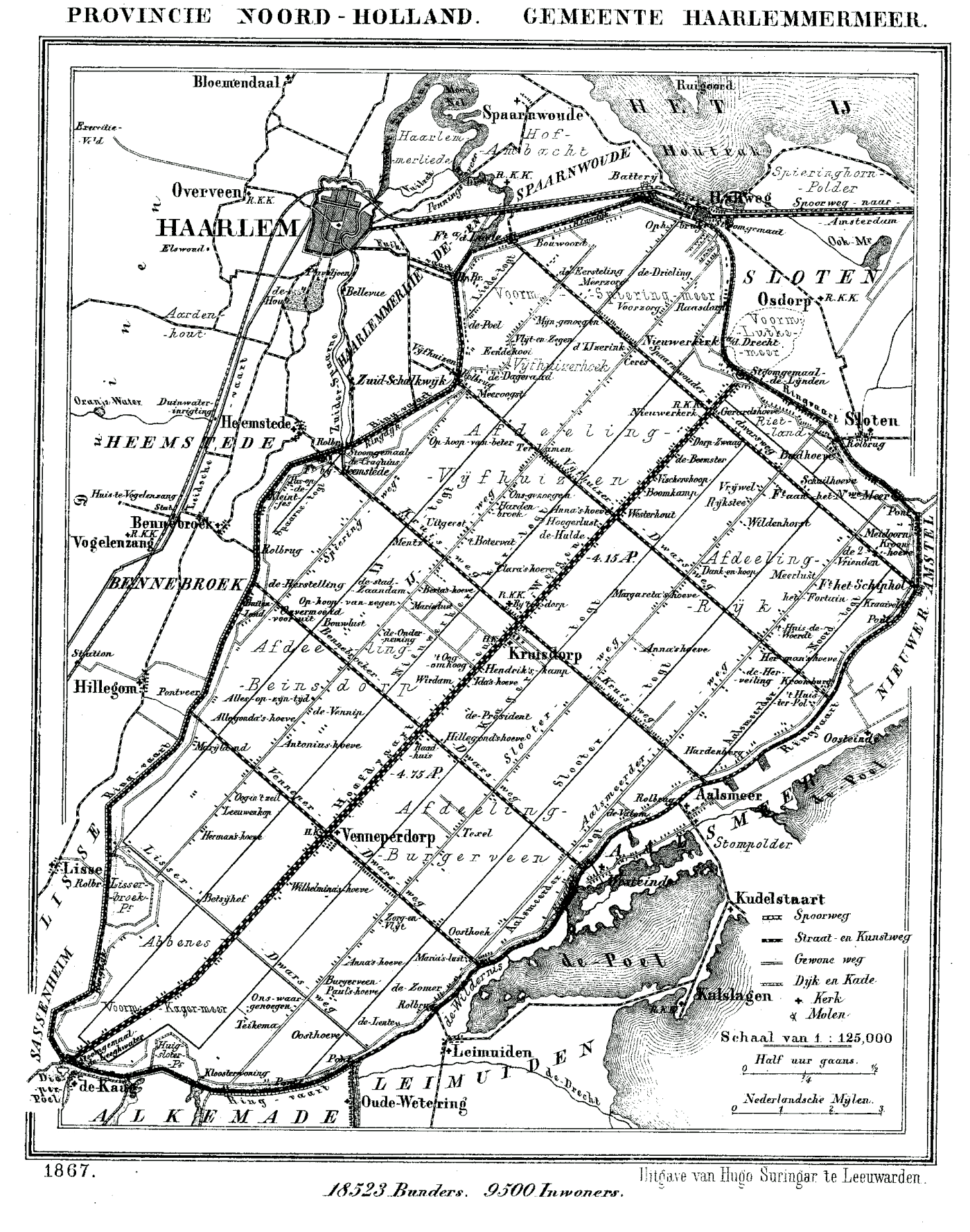
Haarlemmermeer in 1867

Mr. Adrianus van Rossum (1855-1917) from Amsterdam had bought the sugar factory in October 1881 for 81,600 guilders. The factory would not work that season. Adrianus van Rossum came from a family that was already active in the sugar trade and beet sugar manufacture. He first went to live in Halfweg, and then founded a public company "N.V. Suikerfabriek Holland" in Houtrijk and Polanen. Shareholders were:

- Adrianus van Rossum for 85 shares
- Willem Marinus van der Tak for 20 shares
- Frederik Johan Spakler for 20 shares
- Willem van Bevervoorde for 15 shares

Van Rossum became the first director. The three other shareholders became members of the supervisory board. W. van Bevervoorde is probably the director of the Beetsuikerfabriek Geldermalsen. Spakler can be related to the sugar refinery Spakler & Tetterode in Amsterdam.

In 1882 the factory had 5 boilers with a total heated surface of 350 m^{3}. There were 7 steam engines. The surface of the filters was 70 m^{2}. The evaporators had a heated surface of 360 m^{2}. The daily beet processing capacity was 120 tonnes. Raw sugar production was 9.7 t per day. The factory used 18 t of coal per day.

=== Production and expansion ===
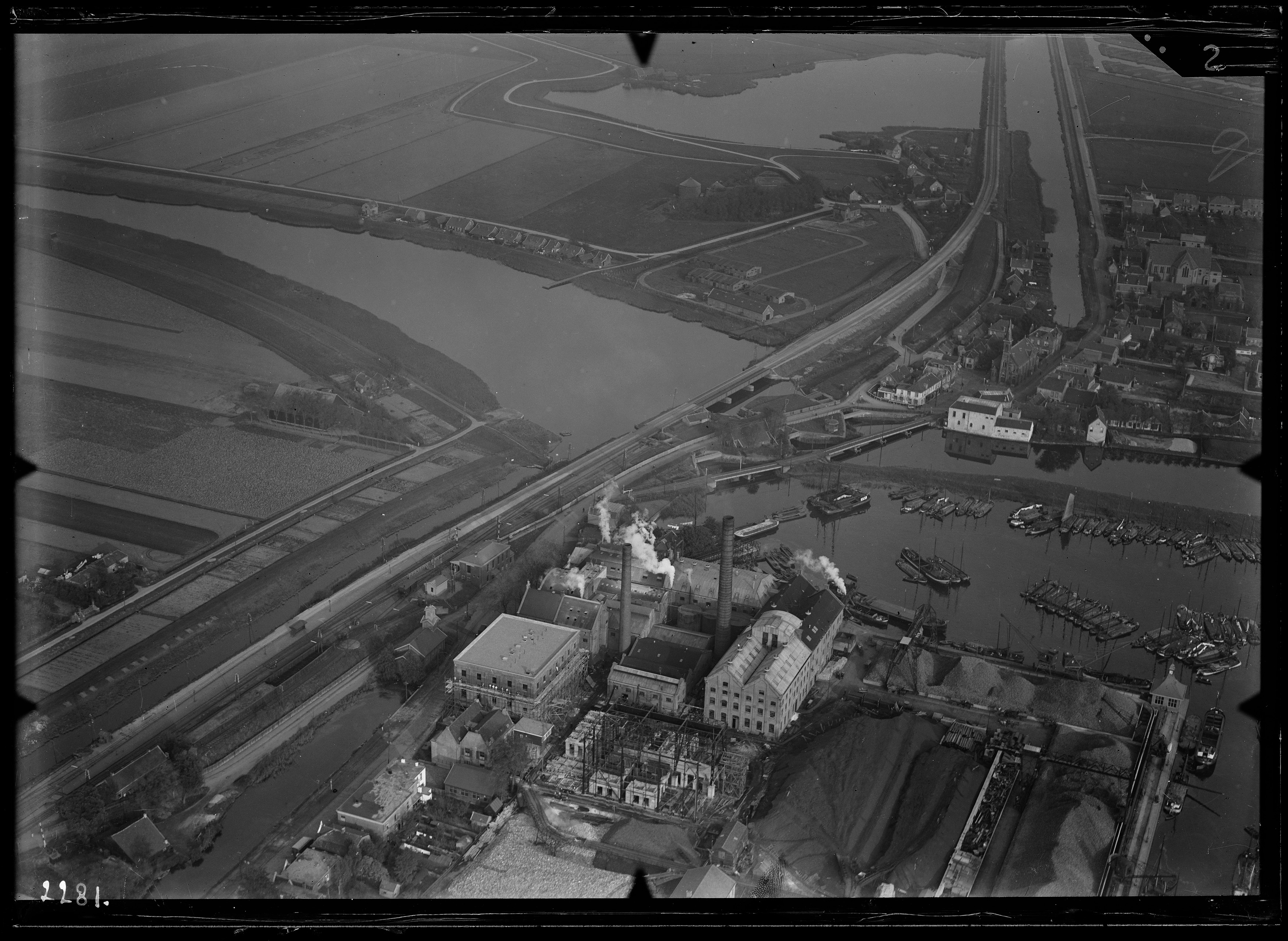
From left to right: Zijkanaal F, railroad, sluices, trambridge almost 100 barges near the factory, c. 1930.

Halfweg 1932: how beet were harvested and transported

Suikerfabriek Holland would succeed where Zwanenburg failed. Some facts about early investments and innovation at sugar factory Holland are known. During 1886 major changes were made to the factory. In 1887 the construction of two separate buildings for heating and osmosis was mentioned. The objective was to move the diffusion process out of the factory proper. By 1888, so many improvements had been made that the factory produced 19 tonnes of raw sugar per day.

A major expansion was the construction of a crystallization building in 1893. In early 1897 work started to double the production capacity of the factory. This included a warehouse, a hall for 4 boilers, a new diffuser, and a new 45 m high chimney. It was however expected that it would take a few years to contract enough beet to use the higher capacity. The 1898/99 campaign showed the effect of the higher capacity: In a 52-day campaign more beet were processed than in the 108 day campaign of 1896/97. While this short campaign did not fully utilize the higher capacity, it still had the advantage of extracting more sugar by limiting the storage time of the beet.

Some production data 1886-1899
| Campaign | Start / end | Sugar beet* | Notes |
|---|---|---|---|
| 1886/87 | 27 Sep - 20 Dec | 14,000 t | |
| 1887/88 | 19 Sep - 17 Dec | 15,500 t | |
| 1888/89 | 24 Sep - 22 Dec | 14,000 t | |
| 1889/90 | 20 Sep - 11 Jan | 30,200 t | |
| 1890/91 | 23 Sep - 22 Jan | 38,000 t | Delayed by frost |
| 1891/92 | 7 Oct - 16 Dec | 23,000 t | Paid low prices |
| 1892/93 | 26 Sep - 13 Jan | 36,000 t | Wet farmland delayed transport |
| 1893/94 | 28 Sep - 25 Dec | 30,000 t | |
| 1894/95 | 4 Oct - 25 Dec | 36,000 t | Beet f 10.00 sugar f 15.00 |
| 1895/96 | 27 Sep - 24 Dec | 37,500 t | Beet f 8.50 sugar f 11.50 |
| 1896/97 | 28 Sep - 13 Jan | 54,000 t | Beet f 9.00 sugar f 13.00 |
| 1897/98 | 5 Oct - 8 Dec | 47,000 t | |
| 1898/99 | 6 Oct - 26 Nov | 56,000 t | Short due to higher capacity |
| 1899/00 | 4 Oct - 15 Dec | 67,000 t | |

During the 1880s and 1890s, there were numerous reports that shed some light on the operations of the factory and on the challenges it faces. During 1886 campaign many beet were grown in the IJ-polders and Haarlemmermeer polder. During the 1886/87 campaign, a drought led to some problems at the factory, because the Amsterdamsche Duinwater-Maatschappij could not deliver enough fresh water, while a new Norton Pump installed at the factory did not yield good enough ground water. The 1890/91 campaign was again busy. In November 1890, about 40-50 barges were loading, unloading or waiting at the factory at the same time. The 1891/92 campaign was very short. It ended on 16 December, after processing only 23,000 tonnes due to the factory contracting at low prices. The 1892/93 campaign was severely delayed by the fields being very wet. The beet could be harvested, but could not be transported from the field to a barge. The 1932 movie illustrates this problem. In 1900, 1,497 vessels were used to transport beet to the factory.

=== Concentration and innovation (1900–1920) ===
Some production data 1900-1919
| Campaign | Start / end | Sugar beet* | Notes |
|---|---|---|---|
| 1900/01 | 4 Oct - 18 Dec | 70,000 t | |
| 1901/02 | 26 Sep - 14 Dec | 80,000 t | |
| 1902/03 | 14 Oct - 26 Nov | | |
| 1903/04 | 12 Oct - 3 Dec | 45,000 t | |
| 1904/05 | 3 Oct - 1 Dec | 61,000 t | |
| 1905/06 | 29 Sep - 16 Dec | | |
| 1906/07 | 3 Oct - 3 Dec | 70,000 t | |
| 1907/08 | 7 Oct - 11 Dec | 78,000 t | |
| 1908/09 | 29 Sep - 5 Dec | 80,000 t | |
| 1909/10 | 7 Oct - 15 Dec | 80,000 t | |
| 1910/11 | 27 Sep - 4 Dec | 90,000 t | |
| 1911/12 | 28 Sep - 20 Dec | 130,000 t | |
| 1912/13 | 27 Sep - 24 Dec | 144,000 t | |
| 1913/14 | 29 Sep - 8 Dec | 140,000 t | |
| 1914/15 | 25 Sep - 1 Dec | 125,000 t | |
| 1915/16 | 4 Oct - 30 Nov | 103,000 t | |
| 1916/17 | 6 Oct - 9 Dec | 119,000 t | |
| 1917/18 | 9 Oct - 1 Dec | 90,000 t | Ended by coal shortage |
| 1918/19 | 18 Oct - 24 Dec | 65,000 t | Interrupted by coal shortage |
| 1919/20 | | 72,000 t | |

As the production data shows, the ever increasing capacity of the factory led to ever shorter campaigns. Of course, the idea was to contract for more sugar beet to utilize the extra capacity in a longer campaign. The data shows that these plans did not come to fruition. The problem was that Sugar factory Holland was not the only factory that increased capacity. The result was that sugar factories began to compete for sugar beet.

The sugar factories then limited their competition by forming a cartel, the Bond van Suikerfabrikanten. In the cartel they made agreements about the sugar beet price. In 1883 e.g. they determined to pay only 10 guilders a tonne for sugar beet in 1884. Later, prices differed by region, but were still steered by the factories. One of the most contentious aspects was whether the sugar content should influence the price. In 1898 the cartel decided on a production quotum for beet. A factory could produce more, but would then have to pay the part of the government subsidy that could be related to his overproduction to the other sugar factories. The cartel caused that the overcapacity in the sector was not corrected.

The situation in the 1880s and 1890s also meant that there was a business opportunity for a competitor outside of the cartel. In 1899 the power of the private sugar factories was broken by the foundation of the cooperative Eerste Nederlandsche Coöperatieve Beetwortelsuikerfabriek in Sas van Gent. It would be followed by the Dinteloord sugar factory in 1908 and a few others in 1913 and 1914. Apart from introducing competition on the sugar beet market, this also brought new competitors to the already saturated raw sugar market.

Meanwhile, technical innovations continued. In 1903 the Wittouck factory in Breda was the first Dutch sugar factory to produce white sugar directly from sugar beet. The same factory installed a Steffen installation in 1908. These technical innovations caused a need for investment capital. In 1905 Holland increased its processing capacity to 1,400 tonnes of beet per day.

On account of the 25th anniversary of the factory in 1907, and overview of the facility was published, and compared with the situation in 1882 (above). In 1907 the factory had 14 boilers with a total heated surface of 1,237 m^{3}. There were 36 steam engines. The surface of the filters was 780 m^{2}. The evaporators had a heated surface of 2,360 m^{2}. The daily beet processing capacity was 1,360 tonnes. Raw sugar production was often 200 t per day. The factory used 90-100 tonnes of coal per day.

These developments finally led to a restructuring of the private beet sugar factories. Some were closed down, while others merged. In 1908 the Suikerfabrieken van Breda en Bergen op Zoom merged with Sugar factory de Mark in Oudenbosch to form the Algemeene Suiker Maatschappij (ASMij).

World War I was problematic for the sugar industry. The production of Sugar factory Holland was limited by coal shortages. This also applied to the sugar refineries that refined the factory's product. As a result, part of the sugar beet harvests ended up as cattle fodder. This was the final blow for some private sugar factories.

In January 1917 A. van Rossum (1855-1917) died after a long illness. On 1 April M.C. de Jong from Haarlem and A.J. van Rossum from Aerdenhout became the new directors.

== Part of Centrale Suiker Maatschappij (CSM, 1920–1992) ==
=== 1920–1945 ===
In Polygoon news in 1967

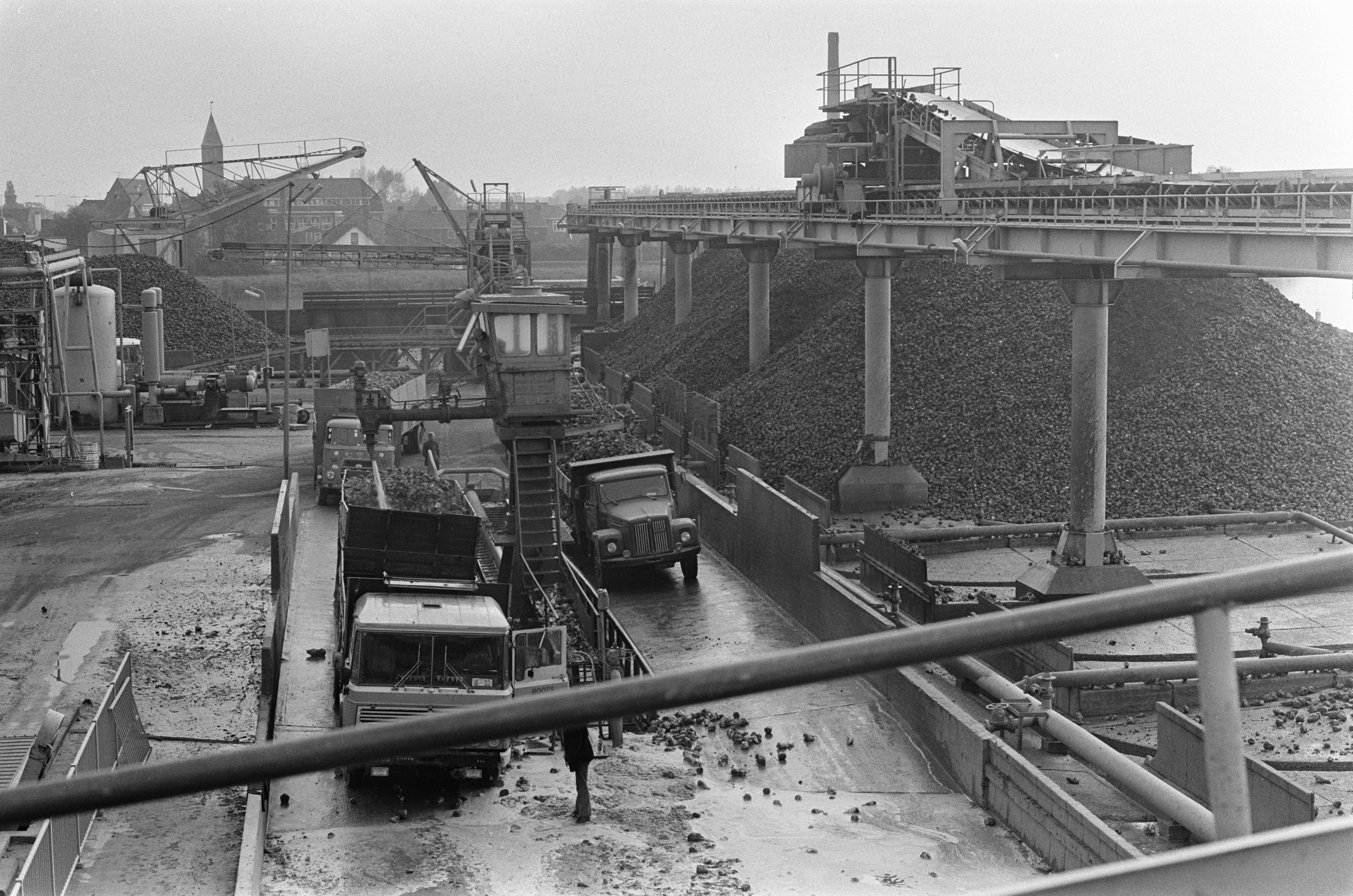
At CSM; 15 oktober 1974.

In late 1919 and early 1920 it seemed that Suikerfabriek Holland would be bought by a newly founded cooperative, which had been negotiating with the factory owners for some time. The price for the factory would be 2,800,000 guilders, while another 1,000,000 would be needed to get the old factory up to date. By mid February, the new cooperative led by Arie Colijn Mayor of Nieuwer-Amstel had placed 4,000 shares at 1,000 guilders. By mid March there was a report that the deal had been closed for 3,420,000 guilders. The Centrale Raffinaderij in Utrecht provided financial backing. However, by late March, the management of the factory denied that it had been sold to the cooperative. The cooperative insisted, and threatened with legal action. When the cooperative offered the price for the shares to Mr. van Rossum, the money was refused, stating that the company had been sold to the Centrale Suiker Maatschappij. On 1 June 1920 the cooperative lost its legal action against A.J. van Rossum. On 2 November 1920 the cooperative also lost the appeal.

The Centrale Suiker Maatschappij had been founded in July 1919, when the Wester Suikerraffinaderij with its factories agreed to found a new holding together with the 'Hollandia' factories, and the 'Van Loon' factories. Sugar Factory Holland was not involved in this deal.

It soon became clear that the CSM had indeed bought a controlling share in the Suikerfabriek Holland N.V. In June 1920 it said that it held the vast majority of shares in the company. When in July 1920 the sugar refinery Spakler en Tetterode closed down due to a lack of raw sugar, CSM noted that Spakler had held a majority of the shares in Sugar Factory Holland, but had sold these.

As a daughter company of CSM, the factory still has some autonomy. However, in 1926 CSM showed its control by ordering the factory not to start that year's campaign. By June 1927 A.J. van Rossum and CSM were in open conflict. On 1 August he was replaced by J. Visser and Ir C. Breebaard, though these men did not become directors of the company.

=== After World War II ===
Until 1950, the evaporators of the factory stood in the old Zwanenburg mansion. An important change to the factory was the shift from producing raw sugar to producing white sugar. This change was completed in 1953. From 1958 to 1963 the factory was almost completely renewed. Batch processing was replaced by machinery that worked continuously, and a lot of processes were automated. By 1963 25,000,000 guilders had been invested since 1945, and daily capacity stood at 4,000 t of beet.

Another major change in the sugar industry was brought about by the supermarket and self-service. Retail shops no longer wanted to separately weigh each customer's order, and therefore asked for consumer size packaging of one or two pounds, instead of 50 kg bags. The sugar factory therefore build two 43 m high sugar silo's that could each hold 20,000,000 kg of white sugar, i.e. the total production of a campaign. After the campaign, the white sugar would then be packaged in new consumer packages, starting in 1965.

The huge investments at Halfweg were paid for by the whole of CSM. The choice to modernize Halfweg was made because of its good location.

The sugar factory would continue to rely on transport over water for quite some time. In 1961, the factory was visited by 1,300 barges and 14,000 trucks. In 1962 these numbers were about 1,000 barges and 8,800 trucks.

The ever increasing production of the sugar factories, and the ever lower cost of transport led CSM to concentrate on only a few sugar factories. In 1973 the factory in Oud-Beijerland was closed. In 1980 the factory in Steenbergen was closed, and 1987 the CSM factory in Sas van Gent closed down. However, by 1992 CSM's factories in Breda and Groningen were enough to fill CSM's European quotum. All that Halfweg produced was sold on the world market for about a quarter of the sugar price in the European Union. That year CSM closed down production in Halfweg. The silo's and distribution center continued to be used.

== Sugar City: the terrain today ==
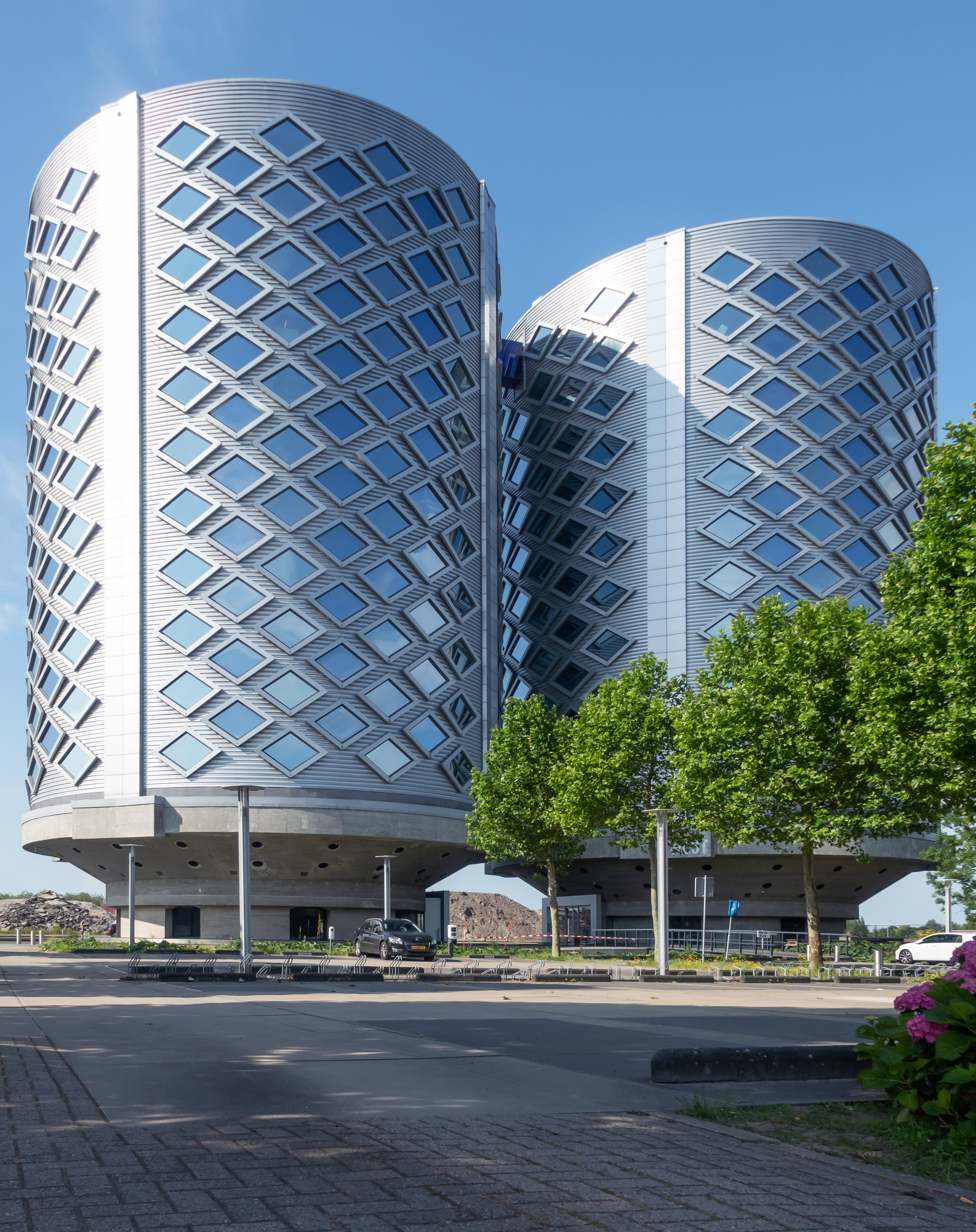
The sugar silo's as offices in 2019

In 2000 the shares of the B.V. Suikerfabriek Holland were sold to a real estate developer which changed the name of the company to Sugar City. The terrains of about 110,000 m^{2} and all the buildings were then redeveloped.

=== Industrial heritage ===
The whole complex now called Sugar City is valuable as industrial heritage. The value comes from the several construction phases that have been preserved. This even goes for the pre-industrial monument Gemeenlandshuis Zwanenburg by Pieter Post (1645). As former seat of the waterboard it has a different functional origin, but the connection with the sluices and the steam pumping station on the other side of the water give the complex an even higher ensemble value. In 2007 the terrains of Sugar City were added to the Holland Route of the European Route of Industrial Heritage.

=== Current use of the terrain ===
The two silo's of the sugar factory where white sugar used to be stored, are now offices. On the outside they are covered in sheet metal, and the windows have hundred of small LED lights that draw attention at night.

The former middle factory and former pulp press hall are now used as an event venue. This part is now called the SugarFactory.CITEREFOntdek_SugarCity2023

In 2020 a factory outlet called Amsterdam The Style Outlets was opened. To build this, the commercial shed on the Ringvaart at the western tip of the terrain had to go. This was a 1980 shed which had been used for storing beet pulp. It had an internal surface of 4,000 m^{2} without support columns and an internal height of 23 m on the rooftop.

== In culture ==
In 1981 the television series De Fabriek was filmed on the terrains of the still active sugar factory. The background plot was that a mighty sugar trust wanted to acquire one of the last independent sugar factories, so it could be closed down. Of course the employees would then lose their jobs, at the time it was a scenario that was very realistic for many people in Western Europe. In 2015 part of the fourth season of the Dutch crime series Penoza was shot at the terrains.

The event venue in the former factory was taken into use in 2010. In 2015 the knockout of The Voice of Holland took place at Sugar City. The terrains and event venue also figure in multiple other television shows.
