= 't Veerhuis =

Coordinates: 51°32′47.98″N 3°48′53.24″E

- Interactive map of 't Veerhuis

Restaurant information
- Rating: Michelin Guide
- Location: Wolphaartsdijkse Veer 1, Wolphaartsdijk, Netherlands

Restaurant 't Veerhuis is a defunct restaurant in Wolphaartsdijk, Netherlands. It was a fine dining restaurant that was awarded one Michelin star in 1975 and retained that rating until 1988. It was again awarded one Michelin star 2008 and 2009.

In the first star period, owner and head chef was Fred van Mierlo.

In the second star period, the restaurant was run by Marianne and Co. Simmers. They decided to move the restaurant to Goes. That went wrong and the restaurant, renamed "Simmers & Co", closed down after a year in business.

Former head chefs were Edwin Dingemanse (2009–2010) and Michel Louws (2005–2009).

In 2011, the former building of 't Veerhuis became once more a Michelin starred restaurant. Restaurant Katseveer had to move due to a major renovation of its own building. From April to August it operated out of Wolphaartsdijk, then it moved back to Wilhelminadorp.

== See also ==
- List of Michelin starred restaurants in the Netherlands
