= Wissekerke =

- Village
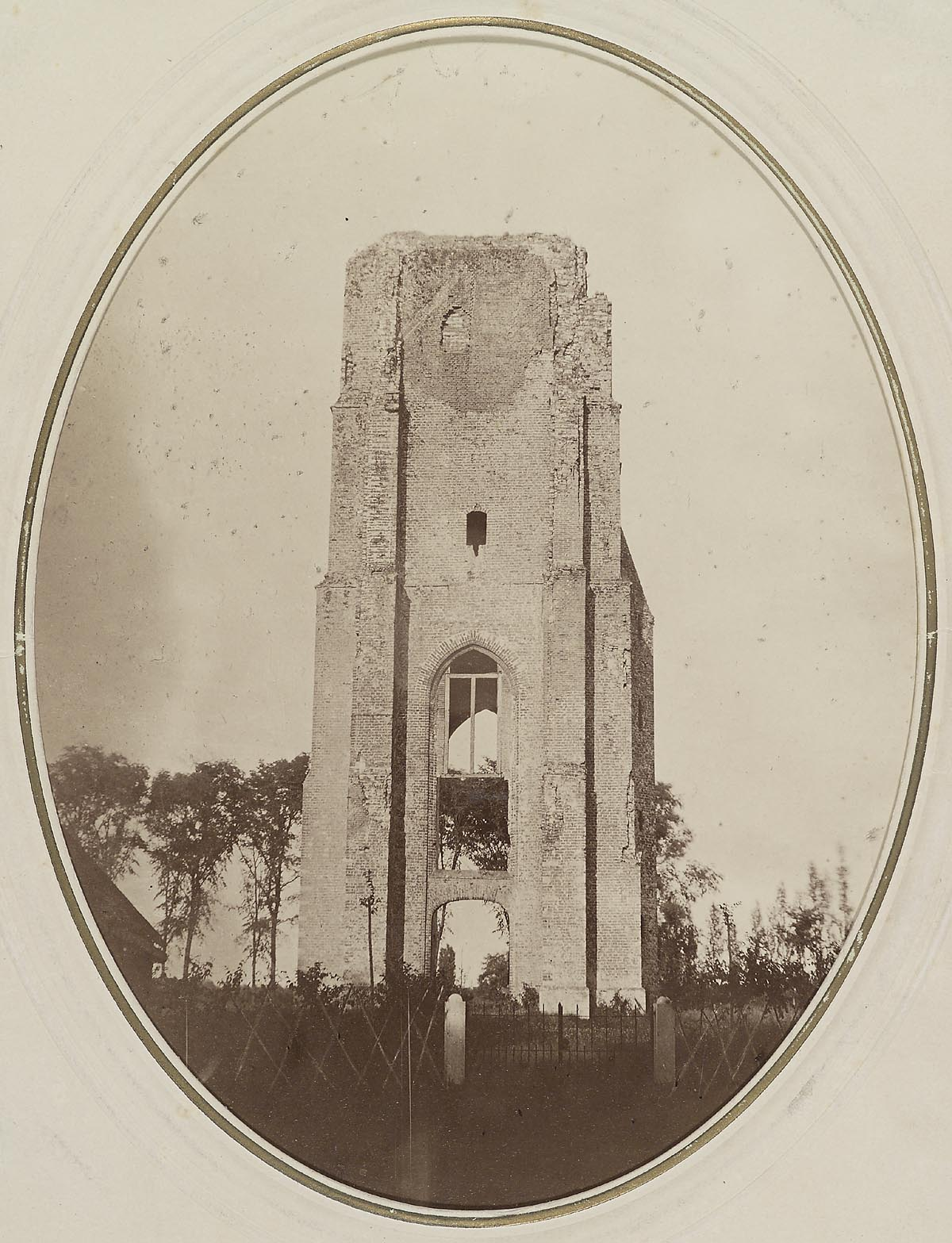
- Wissekerke, Zeeland, Municipality of Goes

- Location in the province of Zeeland in the Netherlands Wissekerke (Netherlands)
- Coordinates: 51°30′6″N 3°50′45″E
- Country: Netherlands
- Province: Zeeland
- Municipality: Goes
- Time zone: UTC+1 (CET)
  - Summer (DST): UTC+2 (CEST)
- Postal code: 4472
- Dialing code: 0113

Wissekerke is a hamlet in the Dutch province of Zeeland. It is located in the municipality of Goes.

It was first mentioned in 1216 as Wicenkerke, and means "(private) church of Witze (person)". Wissekerke was a separate municipality until 1816, when it was merged with 's-Heer Hendrikskinderen.

Wissekerke is not a statistical entity, and the postal authorities have placed it under 's-Heer Hendrikskinderen. It was place name signs. Wissekerke was home to 109 people in 1840.
