= Leo van Doeselaar =

Dutch classical organist and conductor

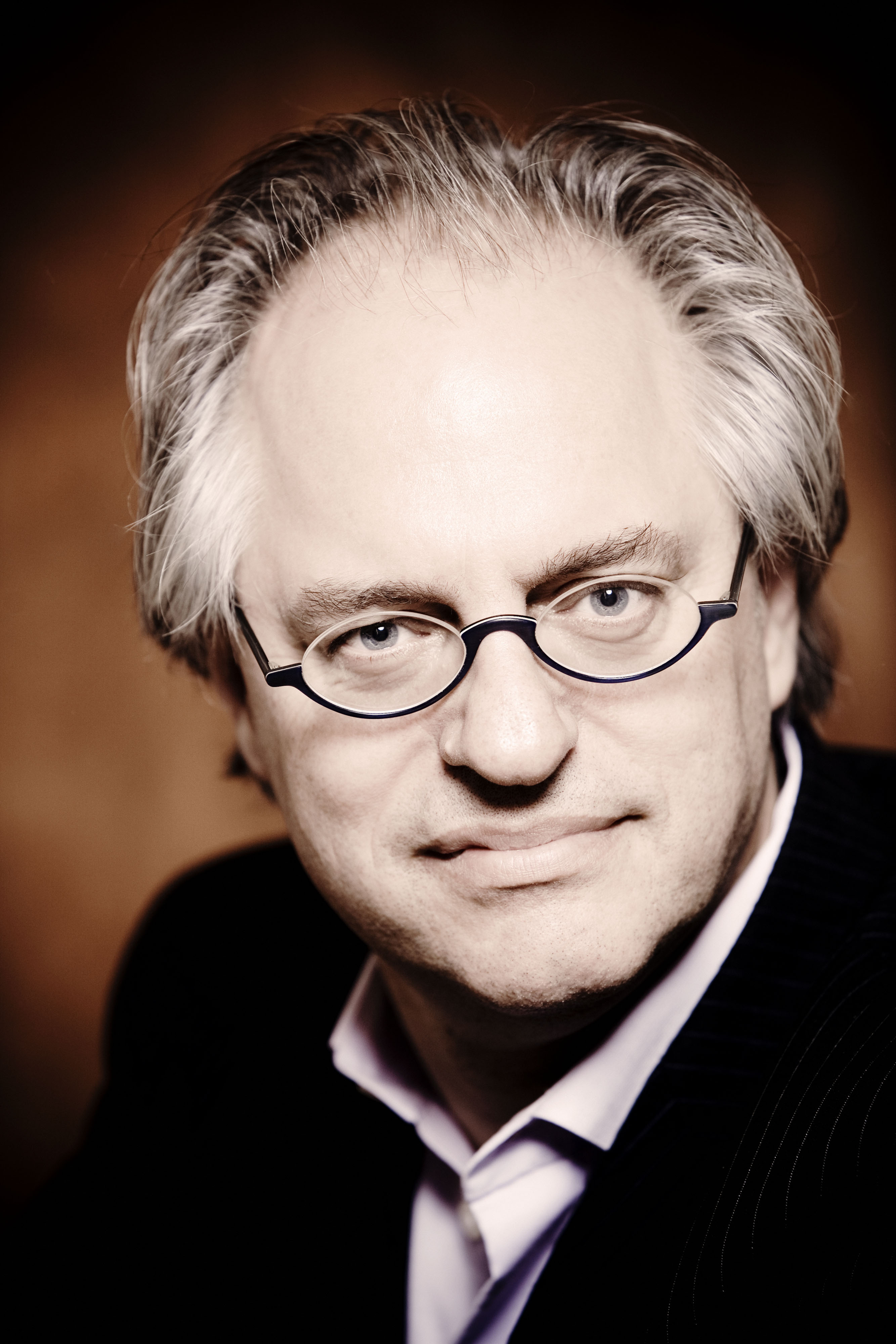
Leo van Doeselaar, 2007

Leo van Doeselaar (born 1954, Goes) is a Dutch classical organist and conductor.

Leo van Doeselaar studied the organ (with Albert de Klerk) and piano (with Jan Wijn) at the Amsterdam Sweelinck Conservatory. He was awarded by the Prix d'Excellence in organ in 1979.

He has appeared with many baroque ensembles including those led by Philippe Herreweghe, Ton Koopman, Gustav Leonhardt, Jos van Veldhoven and Andrew Parrott. He was the organ soloist with the Royal Concertgebouw Orchestra, recorded by Decca - this recording received a Grammy Award.

In 1995 he was appointed Professor at the Universität der Künste in Berlin, a position he held until 2019.

Leo van Doeselaar has been a prolific interpreter of Johann Sebastian Bach, with appearances in 108 productions for All of Bach by Netherlands Bach Society alone.
