= Oostende Castle =

Castle in Goes, Netherlands

- Slot Oostende
- Singelstraat 5 Goes, the Netherlands
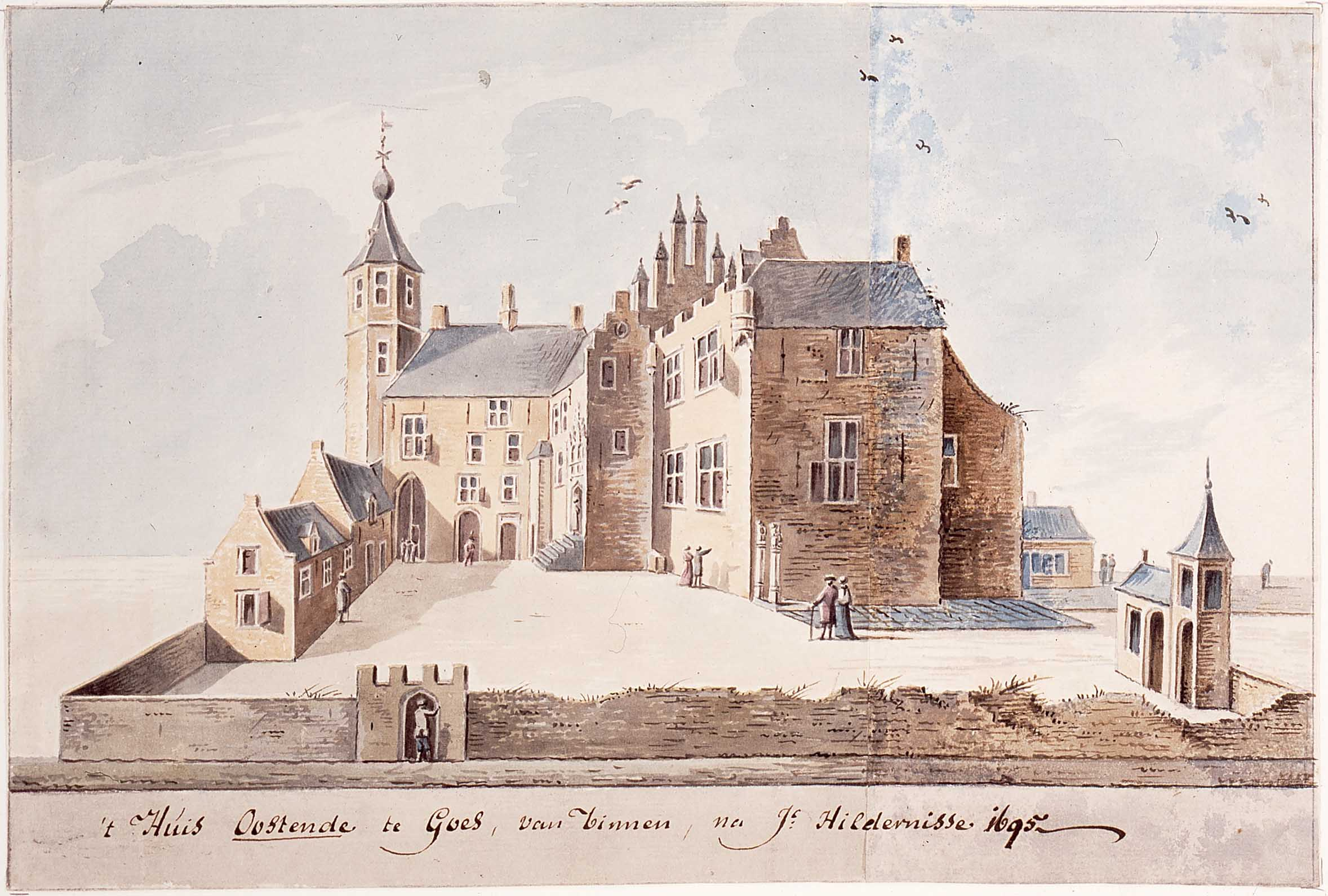
- The castle from the north c. 1695

Site information
- Type: Water castle
- Open to the public: Yes

Location
- The Netherlands
- Location within Zeeland
- Coordinates: 51.503369°N 3.889352°E

Site history
- Built: 14th century
- Materials: brick

Oostende Castle is a castle in Goes, the Netherlands. The current castle was part of a motte-and-bailey castle. Its grounds formed the outer bailey. The motte was directly south of it, now under the Maria Magdalena Church.

The castle consists of a 14th-century tower house built on top of a ring wall that was surrounded by a moat. The foundations of this ring wall have been found west and east of the house. The segment to the west had two towers on the inside, and has been made visible for the public. The tower house has been restored, and is now part of a craft brewery, hotel and restaurant.

== Castle Characteristics ==
=== Phase 1: Motte and bailey Castle ===
In its first phase, Oostende Castle has always been assumed to have been a motte-and-bailey castle, consisting of two more or less round hills, each with its own moat. Both were thought situated west of the natural ridge that runs through the center of Goes, below the central market. The whole terrain is roughly delimited by the Sint Adriaanstraat to the north, Singelstraat to the east, Zusterstraat to the south, and Wijngaardstraat to the west.

The current castle is supposed to have been the outer bailey of this first castle. The outline of practically the whole of its terrain and moats has been determined by archaeological excavations. The circular form that was found supports the motte and bailey idea.

The motte of the first phase of the castle is supposed to have been south of the outer bailey, under the Maria Magdalena church. Nothing is known about this supposed motte.

On the terrain of the current castle, excavators have been asked to also search for signs of a motte, instead of only a bailey. For the terrain of the current castle, the researchers concluded there was nothing that indicated a motte. The oldest remains of buildings dated from the 14th century. By that time motte-and-bailey castles were no longer built.

By 1300, the castle had already been upgraded to a 'huis', which is a medieval Dutch word for castle, see below. One can suppose that Stoke's description of the events in Goes refers to the current castle, but this is not supported by archaeological evidence.

=== Phase 2: The Ring wall ===
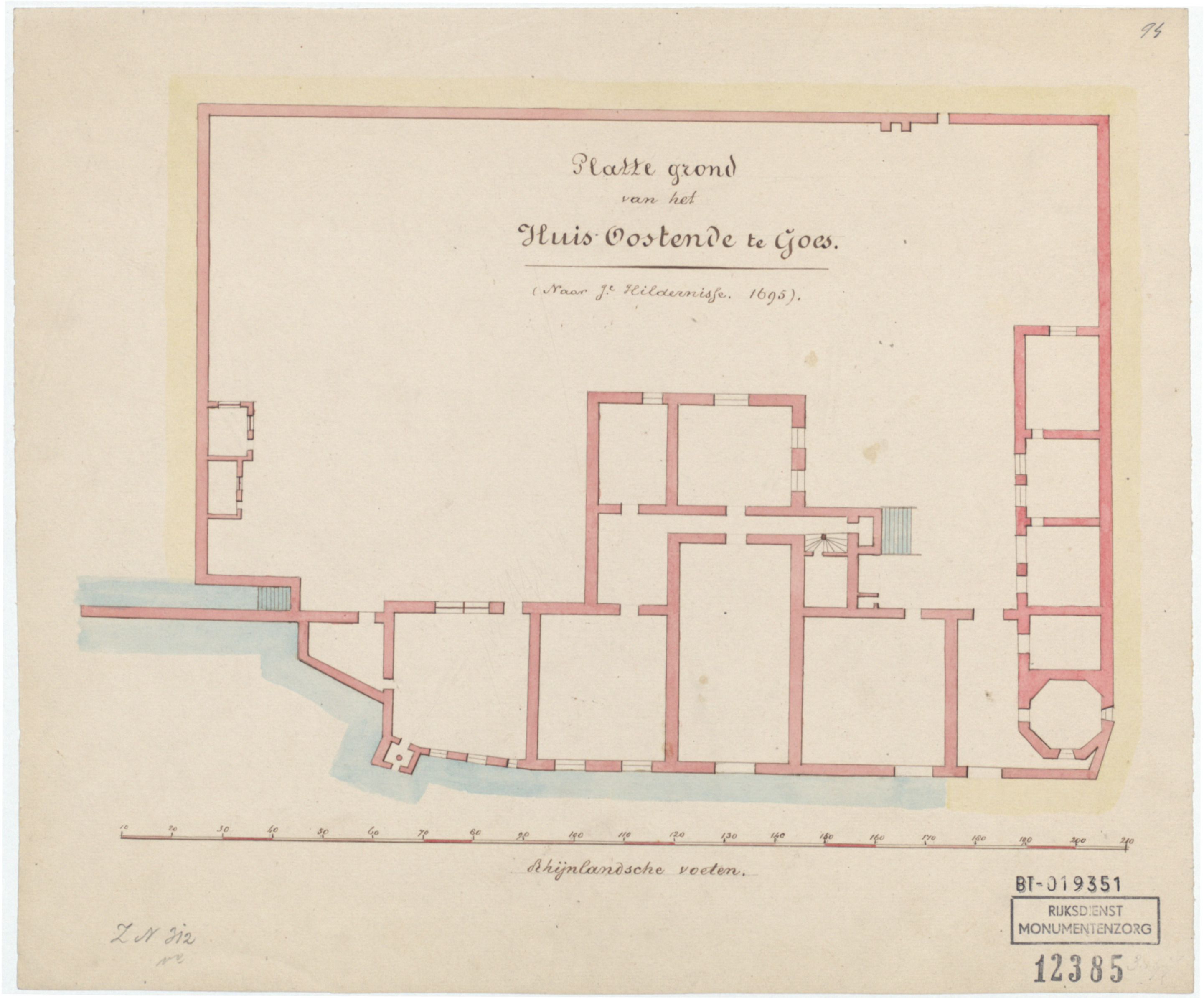
Hildernisse's floor plan

In the early or mid-fourteenth century, a ring wall was built around the outer bailey of the castle. The southwest quarter of this wall runs below the tower house, and was recently investigated. This section of the ring wall was only 60–67 cm thick. It was built using a brick of 25-26 * 12 * 6 cm, which was a size popular in Zeeland by the second half of the 14th century. Putting this date on the wall based on the brick size is supported by a pottery shred in the wall which also dated from the 14th or early 15th century.

The southwest section had two stair towers on the inside. The square one formed an integral of the construction of the wall. The round stair tower was a later addition. A gate was situated just west of the square tower. All this was not on Hildernisse's 1695 depiction of the castle.

In 1970, the southeast section of the ring wall was briefly investigated. Here archaeologists found the foundations of what Hildernisse depicted as the main (octogen) tower of the castle. This is on the bottom right of Hildernisse's floor plan. They also found the eastern ring wall, which stretched straight to the north from this tower. This section seems to have been much more solid than the southern sections of the ring wall.

In 2015 the archaeological finds of the southern half of the ring wall were depicted on a map. It shows that Hildernisse's map of the castle was roughly accurate, but also his tendency to present a somewhat circular floor plan as a square castle. The size of the terrain was about 57 by 42 meters excluding the moat.

=== Phase 2: The tower house ===
The tower house is a large 14th-century building. Its most striking feature is the basement with 6 vaults that are supported by two stone pillars. The basement itself can be dated to the late 14th or first half of the 15th century. Above the basement is the main floor, and above that is another floor.

Up till about 1950 the house had a hip roof which was then replaced by a flat roof. During the renovation the front façade was restored to its medieval condition. It got a stepped gable with little pinnacles as depicted on old drawings.

It is supposed that the first construction phase of the current tower house took place at the same time that the ring wall was built. The reasons to align the construction date of the current tower house with that of the ring wall are as follows: The west, south and east walls of the house are original, and use brick that can be dated from the end of the 13th century till the 15th century. The ring wall and the southern wall of the house do not imply that they have been built at different times. An extra indication that house and wall were built at the same time are the similar arches in the ring wall and the three original walls of the tower house.

=== The octogen tower ===
The octogen tower displayed on old pictures was found during a 1970 excavation. It had a small gate at 5 meters below the ground level. North of the tower the small buildings on the right of Hildernisse's floor plan were found. At the same level, an about 2 meters wide vault extended eastwards into the moat for 7 meters.

=== Other buildings ===
On the western side of the tower house another building known as 'C' was added in the 15th century. Its front façade stood on top of the ring wall, which was not in line with the front façade of the tower house, but receded slightly to the north. This situation was depicted on the early 19th century cadaster map.

Building C had a vaulted basement similar to the one that the tower house still has. It is assumed that the original floor is at the same height as the oldest floor of the tower house. The basement was later filled up. After 1751 it became a stable. On an old picture it had a shed roof. Still later, a new façade was built, in line with that of the tower house. This severely weakened the building. In the early 21st century this was one of the reasons to break it off till the ground level.

West of building C, another similar basement was found during archaeological excavations. It was built with red brick of 23-24 * 12 * 5.5–6 cm and of 27 * 13.5-14 * 7 cm. The basement measured 6 by 3 meters. Its western wall was 80 cm wide. This basement also dated from the 15th century. It might have been filled up already in the second half of the 17th century. This basement and the building on top of it can hardly be pinpointed to old pictures. It was probably demolished in the 18th century.

East of the tower house stood a building later labelled 'A'. In the early 19th century it only had a ground floor with a clock gable, and was depicted as such. In 1887 it got a full first floor with a gable roof. Like building C, A had been built over the ring wall. The heavier 1887 construction thus rested on three different types of underground, and became unstable. In the early 21st century building A was demolished and replaced by a new building, primarily because preservation would have required a very costly new foundation.

Somewhat east of the octogen tower stood the late 14th century bell tower Klokhuis of Goes. This was about 7.5 m square, and had very thick walls. Part of the bell tower was built into the castle moat.

== History ==
=== Van Schenge ===
The Van Schengen family is mentioned as the first owners of Oostende castle.

=== Van Borselen ===
In the mid-thirteenth century the Van Borselen clan took over power in Goes. In 1299 Floris van Borselen and much of the nobility of Zeeland rebelled against the John II, Count of Holland (1247-1304). The rebellion went awry, and in 1300 John, Lord of Beaumont, Count of Ostervant (d. 1302) subjected all of what is now Zuid-Beveland. The Van Borselens even left Borsele Castle without a fight.

The Zeelanders returned later in 1300 with help from Flanders. The chronicle of Melis Stoke then refers to a castle in Goes.

Ter Goes was een begijn
van enen huse, daer doe in
Bouden was Kervinx sone,
De hem pijnde te houden tgone
Metten knapen, de met hem waren,
Jegen de verdrevene scaren.
Si quaemen nachts bider mane
in de lande, ende streden ande
Thuys, der Bouden inne was.

Translation:

An attack started in Goes
near the castle, where
Boudewijn Kervinkszoon,
attempted to defend the castle
with his soldiers,
Against the army of the banished.
At night by moonlight
they came to the country and fought
over the house that Boudewijn defended.

The count of Holland then sent forces from Zierikzee. These defeated the Zeelanders, but meanwhile Boudewijn had left Oostende Castle, because he thought the count had been beaten.

=== De Beaumont ===
In 1315 John of Beaumont (1288-1356) became the new lord of Goes. He, and his successor Guy II, Count of Blois (d. 1397) used to grant Goes in arrear-fief. In 1350 the Hook and Cod wars started. In 1353 Oostende Castle was not on the list of castles that were garrisoned during this war.

In 1386 the priest of Goes rented the castle from Willem Danielszoon, who obviously held it from Guy of Blois. In 1384 the clock tower of Goes had been built into the moat. The straight east wall of the castle might have been built at the same time.

=== The count of Holland ===
Upon the death of Guy of Blois in 1397, the castle reverted to the Count of Holland. In 1413 he granted it to Willem Danielszoon.

=== Van Maalstede ===
Shortly after Willem Danielszoon became lord of the manor, it was granted to Wolfert van Maalstede, bailiff of Goes from 1419 to 1446. Together with his wife Maria van Haamstede he had many possessions on Zuid-Beveland. He probably resided in Goes, as well as on Maalstede Castle in Kapelle, and on 's-Heer Hendrikskinderen Castle. In 1417 Goes got the right to build a city moat.

Upon Wolfert's death, he was quite broke. This resulted in a list of his assets. On the castle grounds were 11 cows, a horse, 19 goose and 24 swans. There were some tapestries, a chandelier, a harp. David van Baarsdorp came next, and probably lived at the castle till his death in 1477.

=== Van Oostende ===
Jan van Oostende was the next owner. He probably constructed the vaulted basements in the tower house, and those west of it. He also placed the pinnacles on the tower house, and probably built many other buildings on the terrain. This was the time that the name Slot Oostende came into use. Meanwhile, houses were built on the south side of St. Adriaanstraat, which were closed off from the castle grounds by a wall, parts of which might have been built on top of the old ring wall.

Next came Anna van Oostende. She married a Flemish nobleman and lived at Tillegem Castle near Bruges most of her live. She died in 1573.

=== Van der Waarde ===
The Eighty Years' War delayed the settlement of Anna's inheritance. The next owner was Maarten van der Waard. On the castle he had an arms room, with armor, swords, muskets, bows, etc. Maarten had two sons, Boudewijn (d. 1618) and Marinus (d. 1632). During the 17th century the western moat of the castle was filled up, and the terrain sold to build houses.

=== Oostdijck ===
In 1635 Pieter Oostdijck bought the castle for his daughter Geertruyd. Her first husband Willem Ooms died in 1639. In 1644 Geetruyd remarried to Adriaen van der Goes. This family continued to adhere to the Catholic faith. A stone with three goat heads found on site, depicts this family's coat of arms.

=== Hospital ===
In 1747 the government bought Oostende Castle to found a hospital on the site. A few years later the city of Goes became the new owner.

=== Inn ===
In 1750 the surgeon Cornelis Steenaard became the new owner. In 1751 he turned it into an inn. It had a stable for visitors. In the late 18th century, part of the building was used to process tobacco.

In 1840 Jan Koens became owner. He built new rooms north of the old tower house. In 1887 he added an extra floor to building A (above). In 1928 a cinema was built on the castle grounds.

== Renovation ==
In about 2000 Goes municipality became owner of the castle grounds. Many investigations showed that not only the basement, but also many other elements on the grounds were worthy of preservation. In 2011 the cinema was demolished.

In 2016 new owners started a renovation. They now run the company Slot Oostende, which is a hotel on multiple locations, a restaurant, a café, a party venue, and a craft brewery.

== Gallery ==
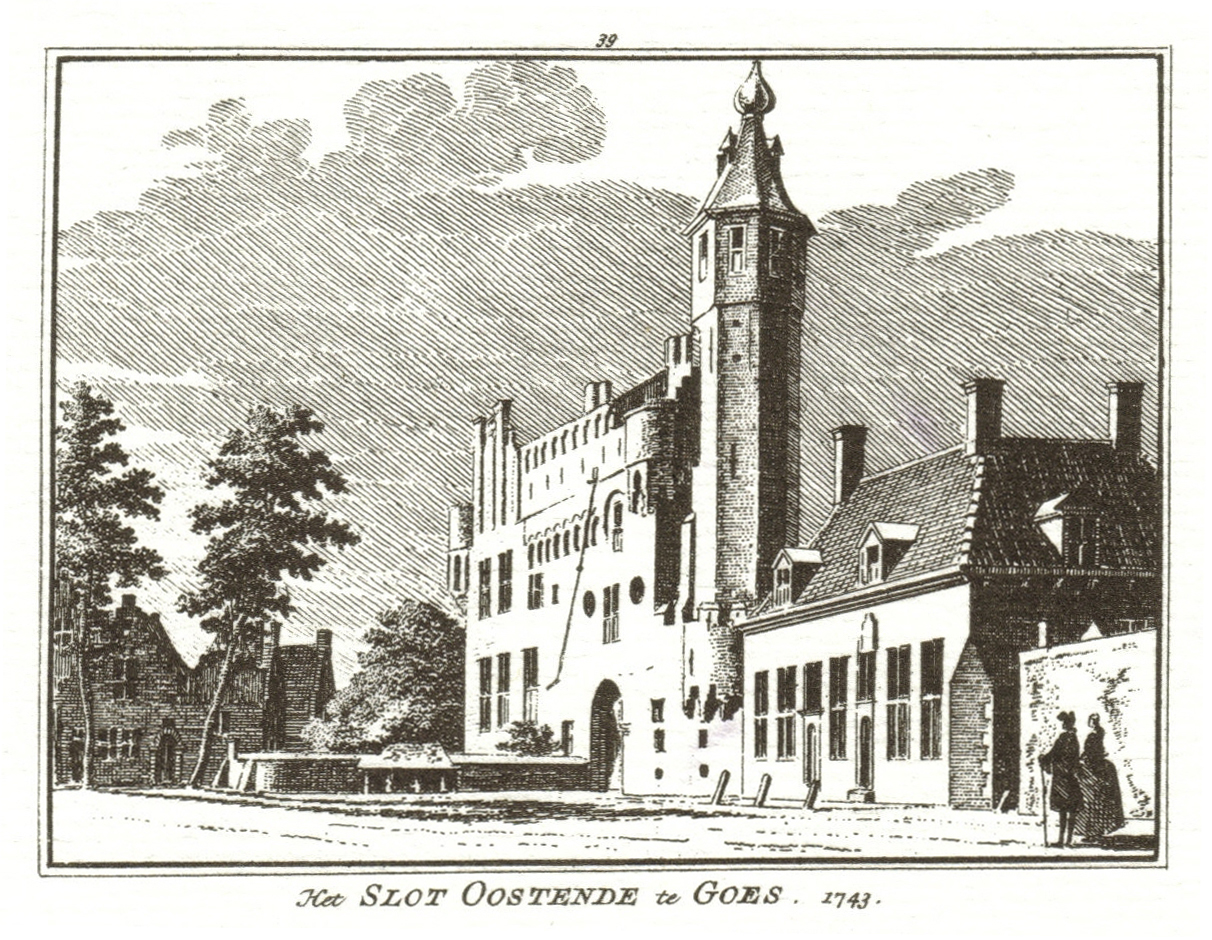
Oostende Castle in 1743

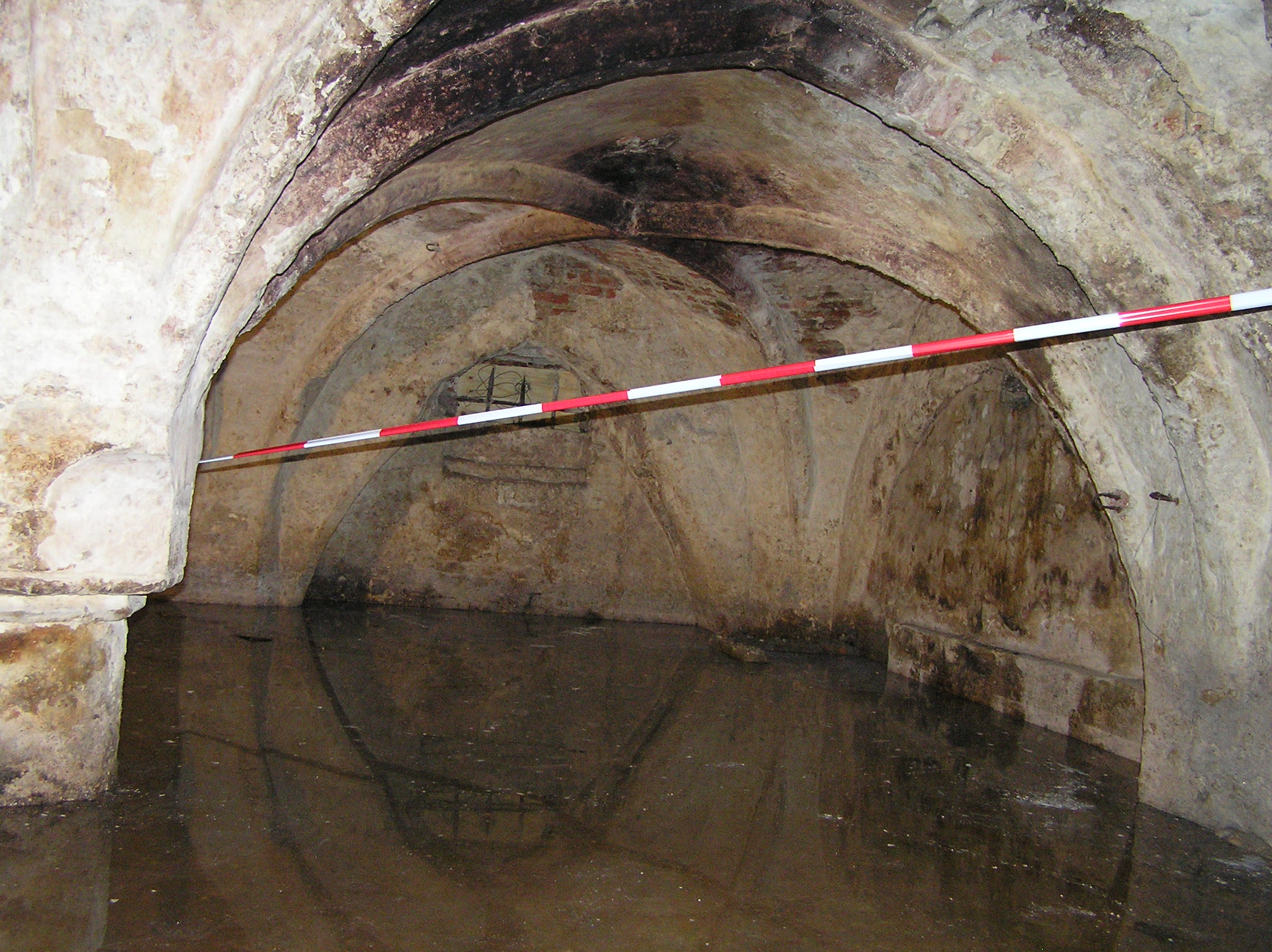
The vaulted basement before renovation

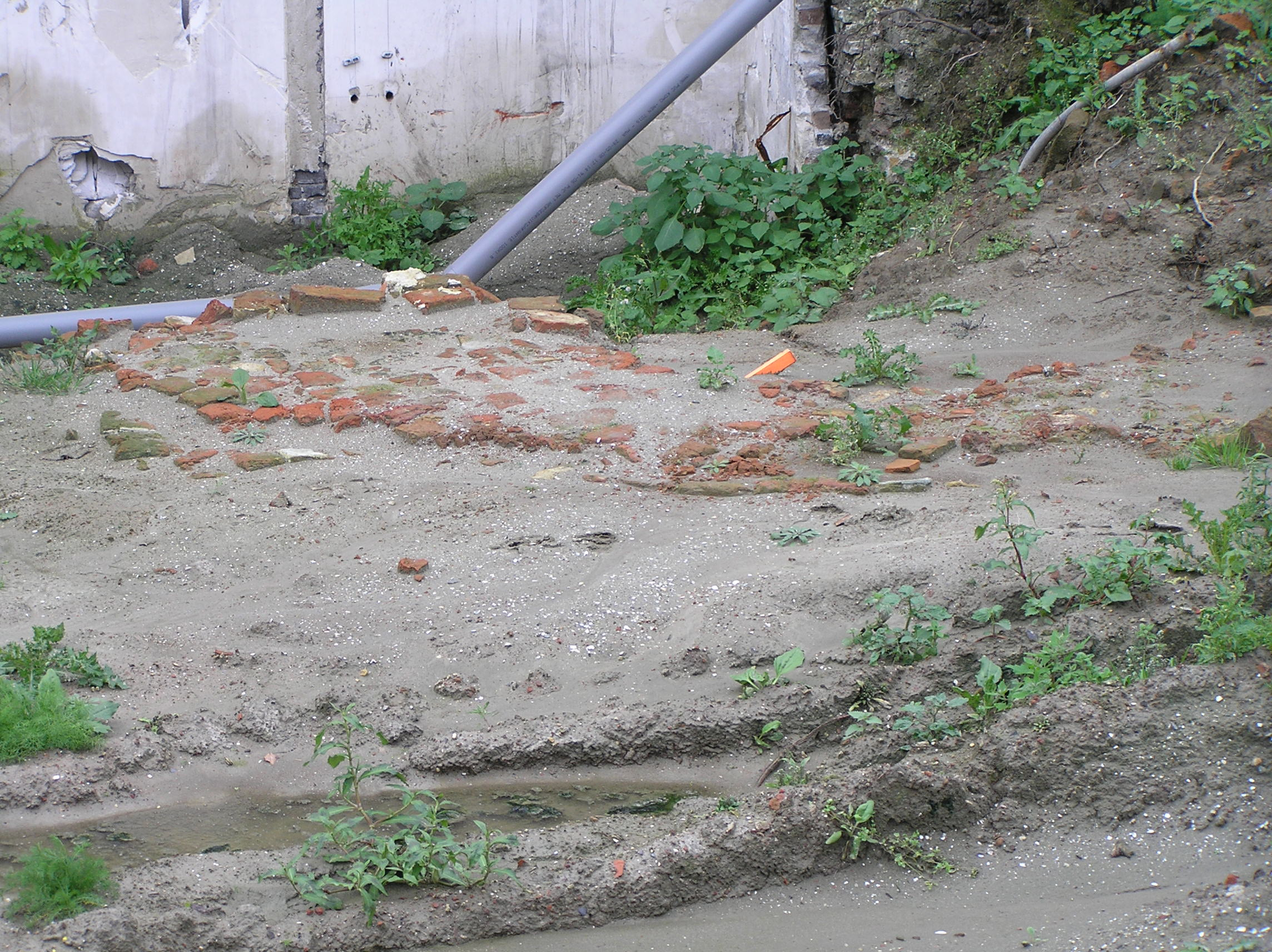
Foundation of western stair tower
