= Martijn Dieleman =

Dutch volleyball player (born 1979)

Personal information
- Nationality: Dutch
- Born: 11 May 1979 (age 47); Goes, Netherlands
- Height: 2.03 m (6 ft 8 in)
- Weight: 94 kg (207 lb)

Volleyball information
- Position: Outside hitter
- Number: 17

Career
Years	Teams
1998-1999	Remote, Zwolle

National team
1999-2003	Netherlands

Martijn Dieleman (born 11 May 1979 in Goes) is a former Dutch male volleyball player. He was part of the Netherlands men's national volleyball team. He competed with the national team at the 2000 Summer Olympics in Sydney, Australia, finishing 5th. He played for Remote, Zwolle in 1998.

== Personal life ==
Dieleman is a life and spiritual coach who runs a self-improvement Youtube channel.

== See also ==
- Netherlands at the 2000 Summer Olympics
