= Kattendijke =

- Village
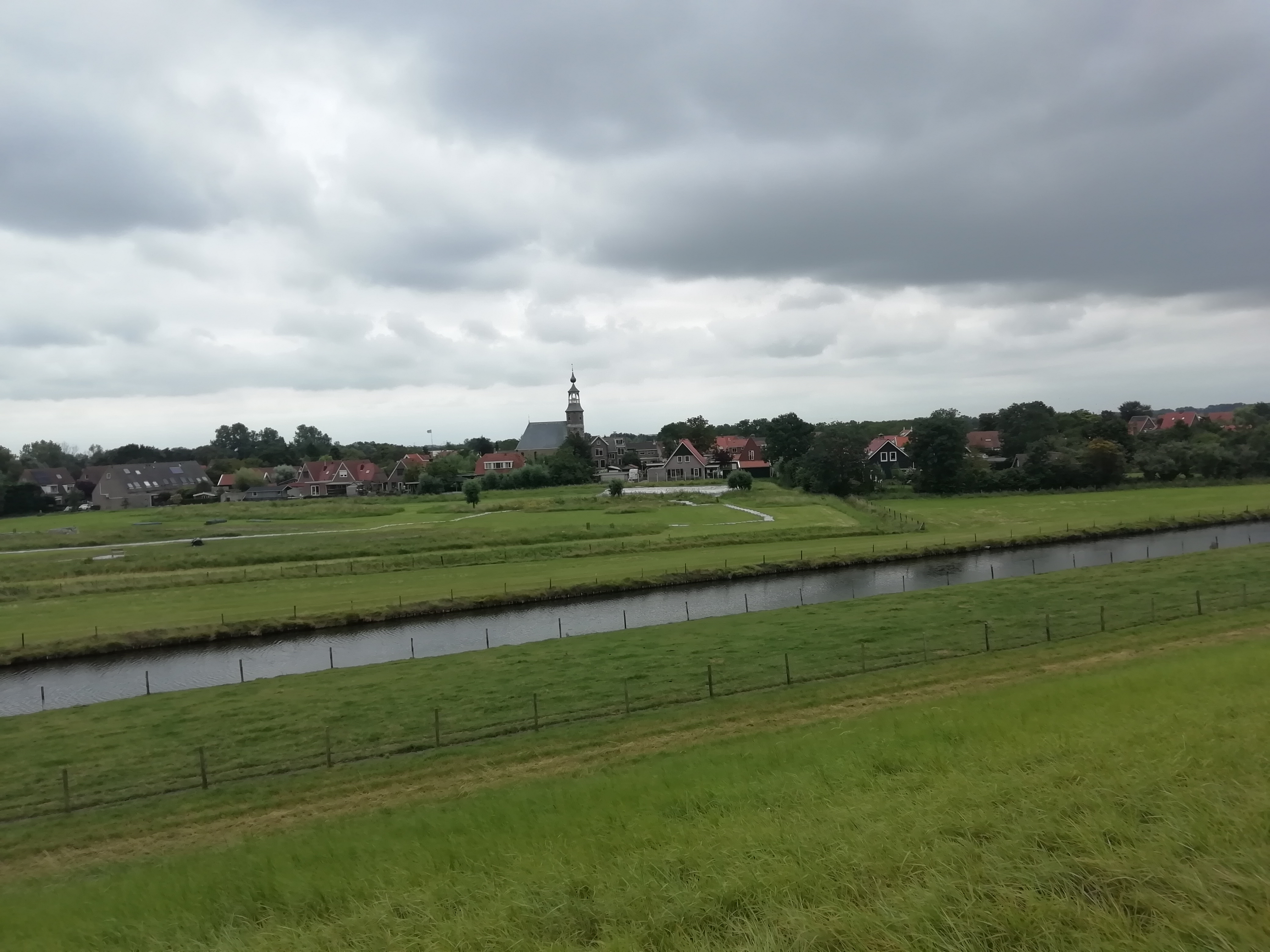
- View on Kattendijke

- Coat of arms

- Location in the province of Zeeland in the Netherlands Kattendijke (Netherlands)
- Coordinates: 51°31′22″N 3°56′36″E
- Country: Netherlands
- Province: Zeeland
- Municipality: Goes

Area
  - Total: 5.11 km^{2} (1.97 sq mi)
- Elevation: −0.3 m (−0.98 ft)

Population (2021)
  - Total: 530
  - Density: 100/km^{2} (270/sq mi)
- Time zone: UTC+1 (CET)
  - Summer (DST): UTC+2 (CEST)
- Postal code: 4474
- Dialing code: 0113

Kattendijke is a village in the Dutch province of Zeeland. It is located in the municipality of Goes on the Oosterschelde about 5 km northeast of the city of Goes.

== History ==
The village was first mentioned in 1214 as Cattindic. The etymology is unclear. The flood of 1134 resulted in large inundated areas around Kattendijke. The Cistercians monks from abbey Ter Doel started to build dikes and polder the land. Kattendijke developed into a heerlijkheid.

The Dutch Reformed church was built in 1404 on a terp (artificial hill). Only the nave of the medieval church remains due to war and decay. It was renovated in 1954 and restored to its original shape.

Kattendijke was home to 255 people in 1840. In 1927, a railway station was built on the Goes to Wemeldinge railway line. The station closed in 1934.

Until 1970, Kattendijke was a separate municipality when it was merged into Goes. The municipality also covered the village of Wilhelminadorp which contained the town hall.

== Gallery ==
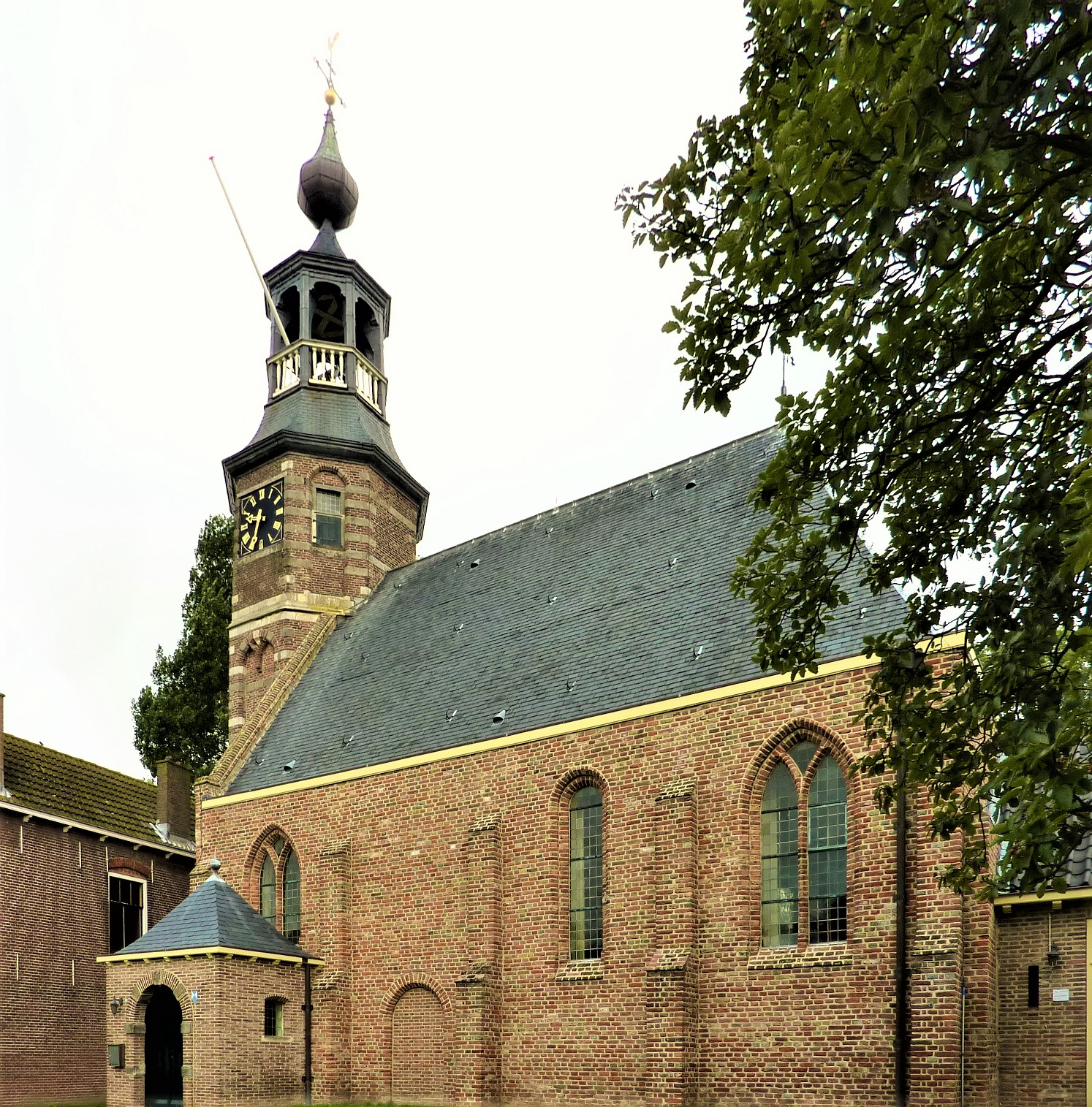
Dutch Reformed church

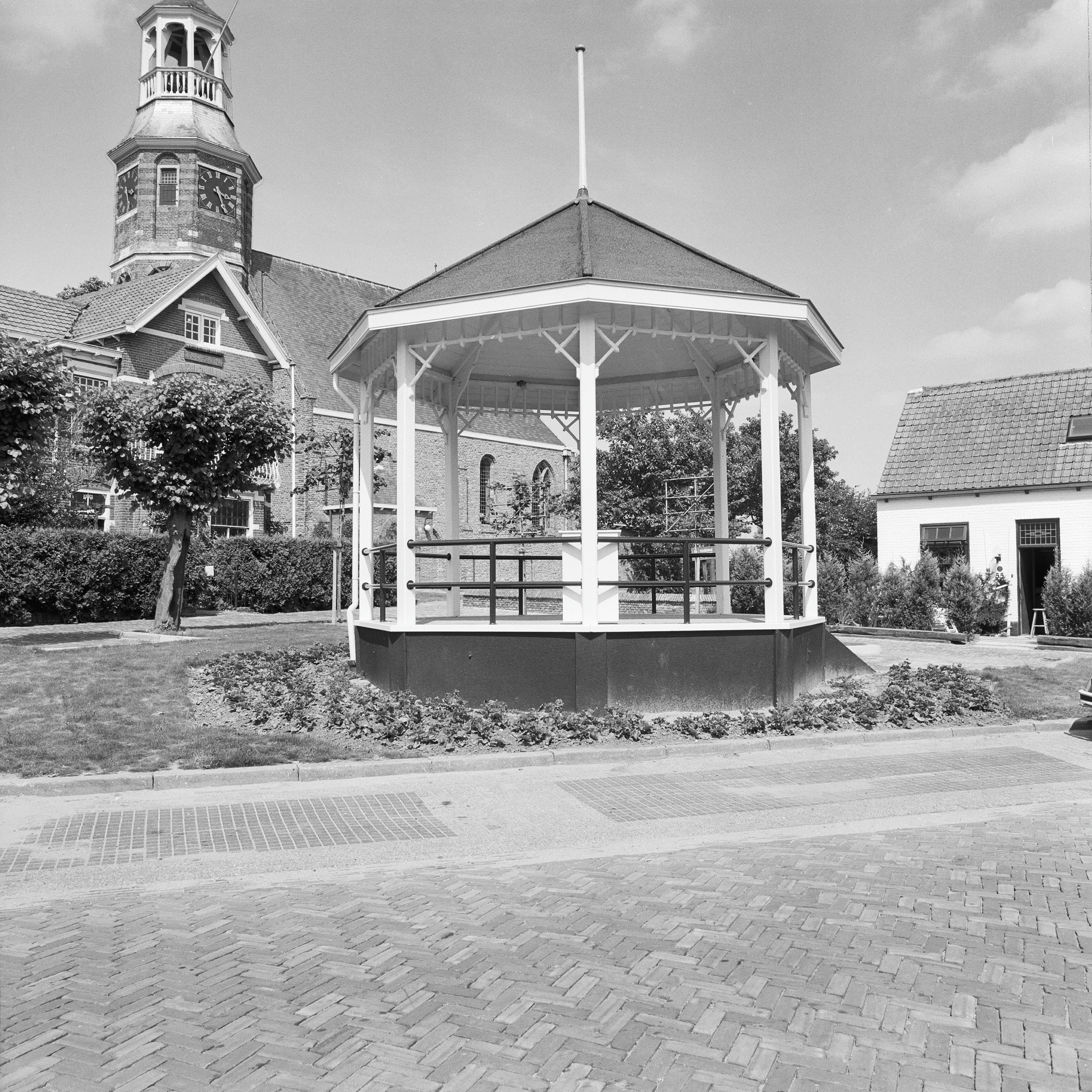
Bandstand
