= 's-Heer Arendskerke =

- Village
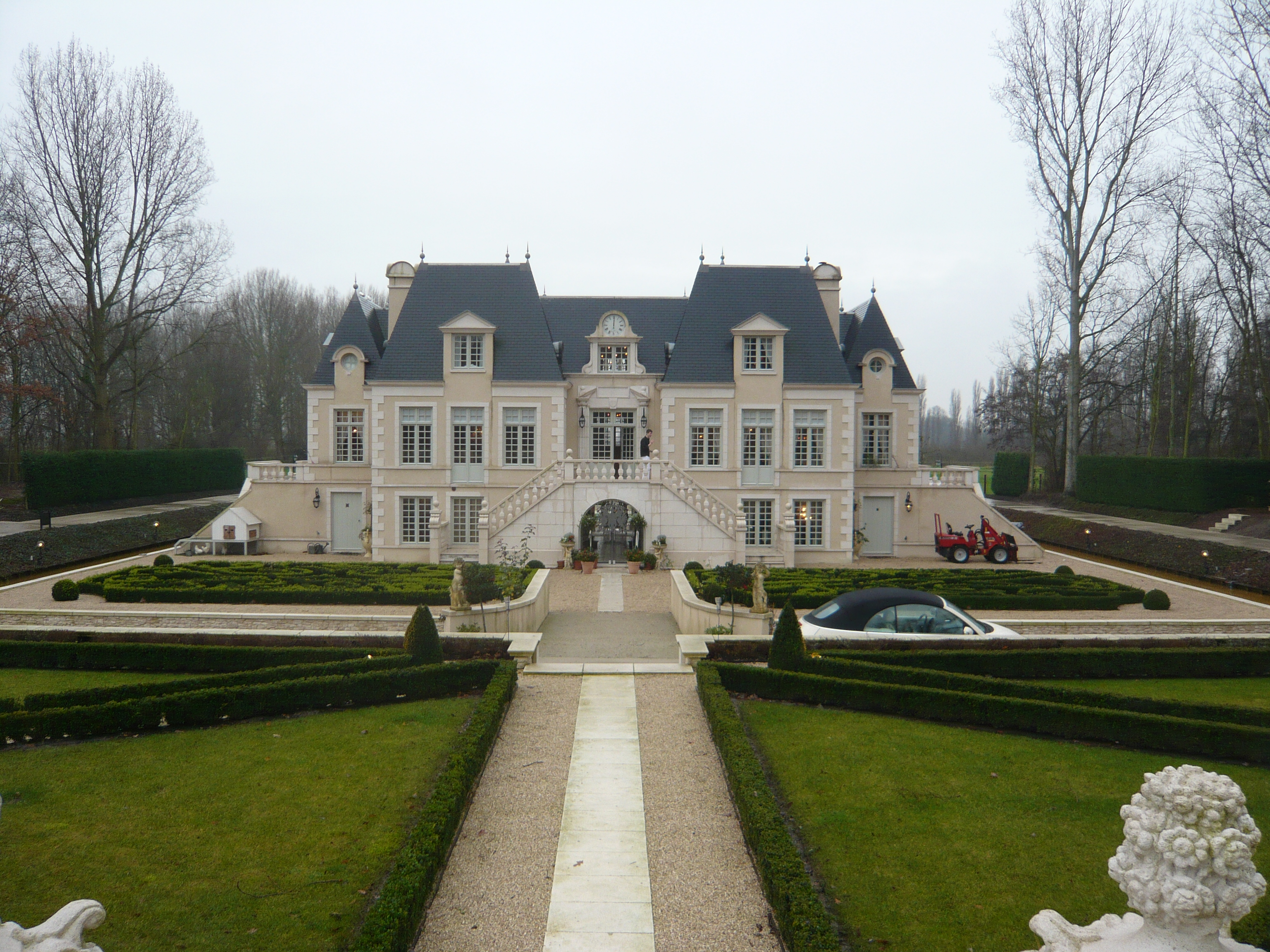
- Arendsslot

- Coat of arms

- Location in the province of Zeeland Location in the Netherlands Location in Europe
- Coordinates: 51°29′30″N 3°49′23″E
- Country: Netherlands
- Province: Zeeland
- Municipality: Goes

Area
  - Total: 8.32 km^{2} (3.21 sq mi)
- Elevation: 0.2 m (0.66 ft)

Population (2021)
  - Total: 1,260
  - Density: 151/km^{2} (392/sq mi)
- Time zone: UTC+1 (CET)
  - Summer (DST): UTC+2 (CEST)
- Postal code: 4458
- Dialing code: 0113

's-Heer Arendskerke is a village in the municipality of Goes in the south-western Netherlands.

== Overview ==
The settlement consists of two circles of houses around a Protestant church, on a single main road with an obsolete village hall. On the other side of the main road is a little industrial site called Eindewege (end of the road), containing tin huts and small garages. The remainder of the area is given over to fields for agriculture.

There is one primary school and one secondary school. There is also a GP and a nurse/physiotherapist. The village also has a fire brigade unit with two trucks Rijkswaterstaat maintains a winter depot here, with reserve stocks for dyke repairs.

== History ==
In 1198, when Dirk VII, Count of Holland made a donation to Middelburg Abbey, the lords of Schengen, brothers Arnold and Henry, were attested as Arnoldus et Henricus de Scinge. They both seem to have founded a church named after themselves: Ecclesia Arnoldi and Ecclesiam Henrici, now the villages of 's-Heer Arendskerke and 's-Heer Hendrikskinderen.

This village was first mentioned around 1280 as Ecclesia Arnoldi, and means "(private) church of Arnold (person)". The floods of 1014 and 1134 reduced Zuid-Beveland to islands. 's-Heer Arendskerke was founded in the late 12th century after a dike was built. It was originally a maritime settlement, but as the sea silted, it became an agricultural community. It was originally a circular settlement around the church.

In the 13th century, a motte-and-bailey castle was built by Arend or Arnoldus van Skinge. The castle was heavily damaged during the Eighty Years' War and demolished in the 17th century. The tower of the Dutch Reformed church dates from the 14th century. The 13th century nave was replaced in the 15th century. The choir was demolished in 1859 and replaced by consistory.

's-Heer Arendskerke was home to 1,325 people in 1840. In 1872, a railway station was opened on the Roosendaal to Vlissingen railway line. In 1927, the lines Goes to Hoedekenskerke and Goes to the ferry at Wolphaartsdijk were added. The station closed in 1946, and the building was demolished in 1963.

The grist mill Nooit Gedacht was constructed in 1872. In 1912, an engine was installed in the wind mill. In 1984, it was sold to a foundation and restored in 1988, and has returned to active service.

's-Heer Arentskerke was a separate municipality until 1857, when it was merged with 's-Heer Hendrikskinderen. In 1970, it was merged into Goes. In 2009, the Renaissance Revival castle Arendsslot was built and is used for weddings, meetings and parties.

The Vrouweputje is located to the south of the village and is a site of Catholic pilgrimage. According to legend, Greet was banned from Goes and Mary appeared near a well and told Greet to cure people. The water in the well is brackish.

== Gallery ==
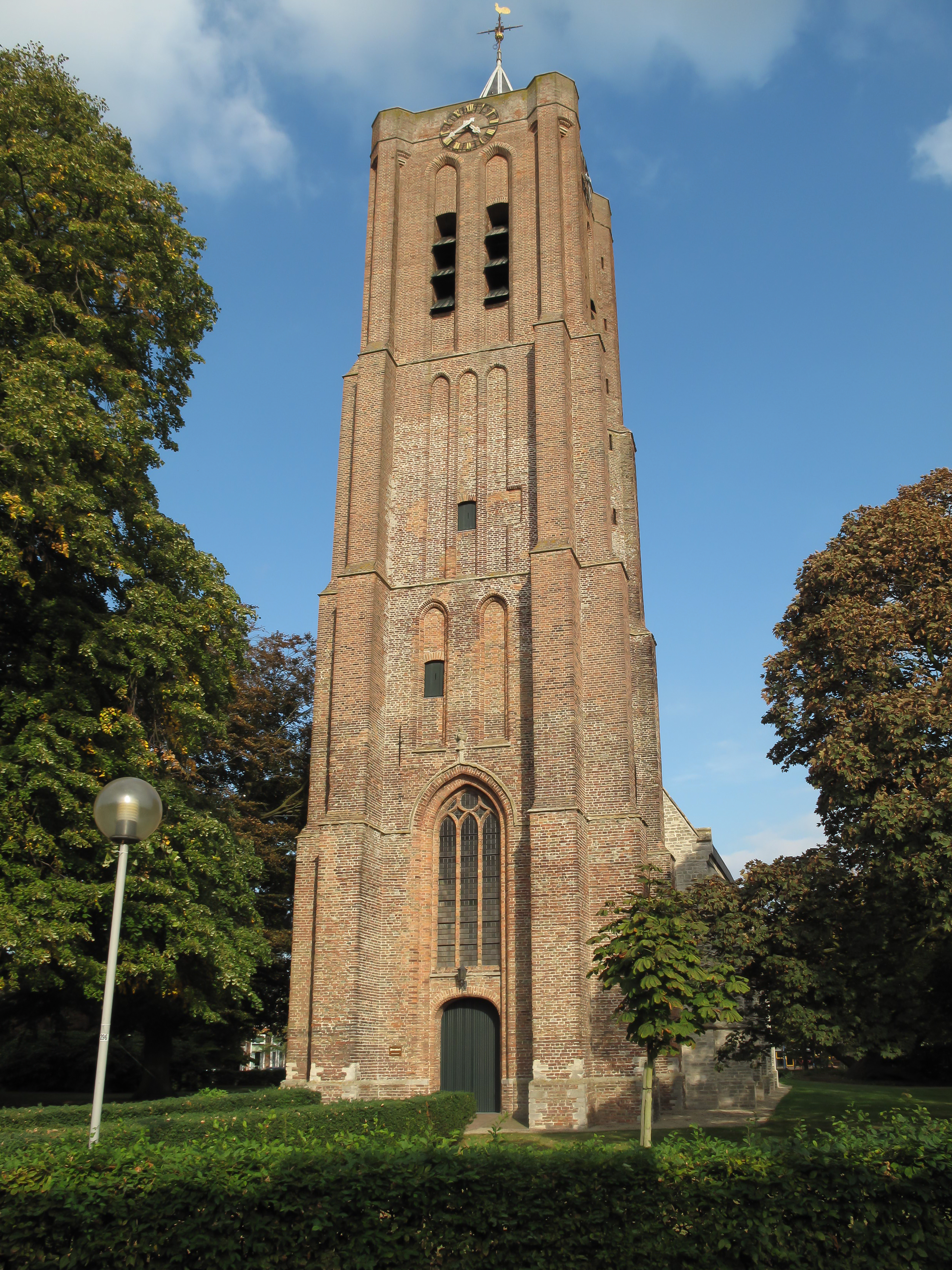
Dutch Reformed church

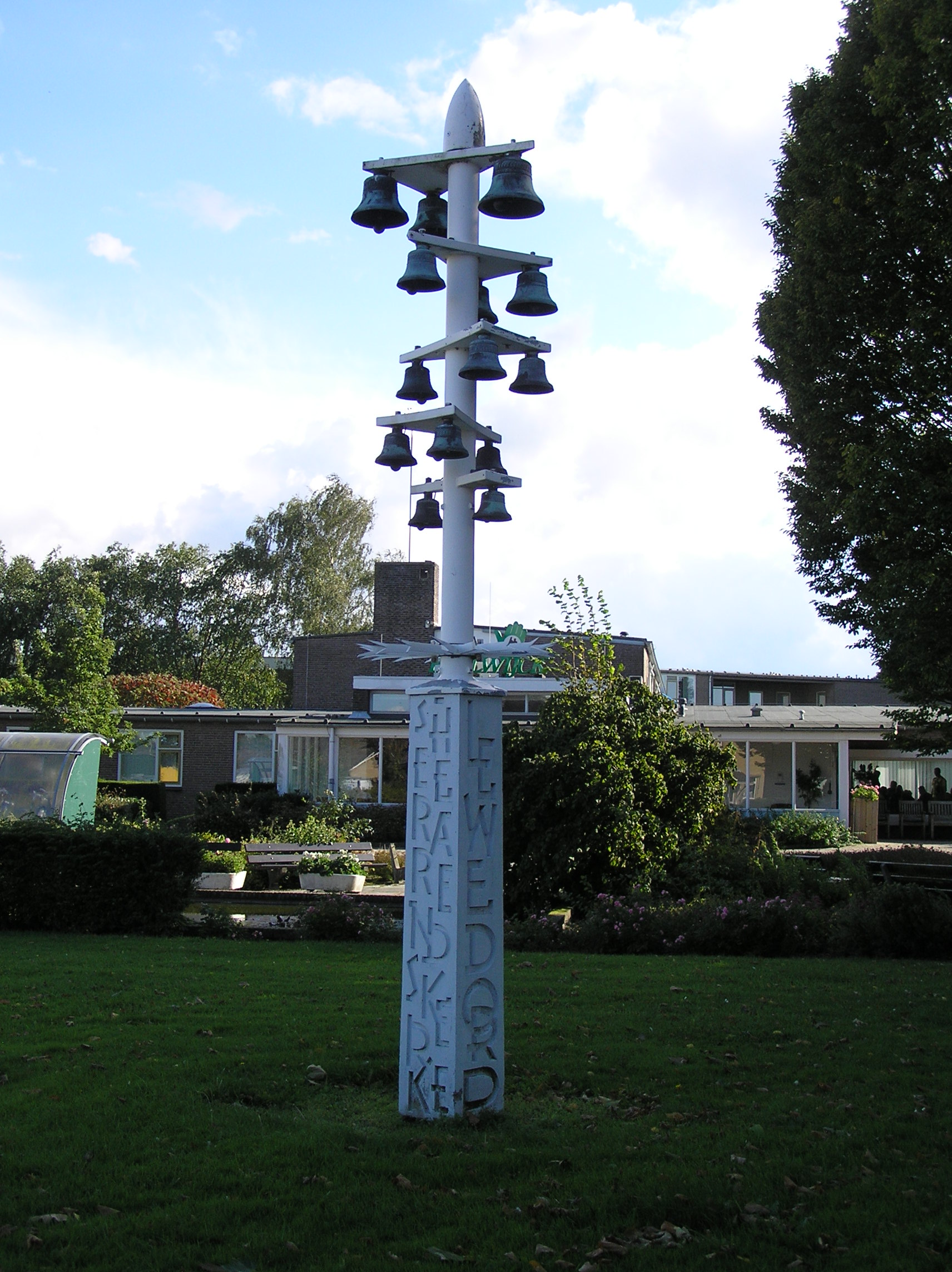
Carillon of 's-Heer Arendskerke

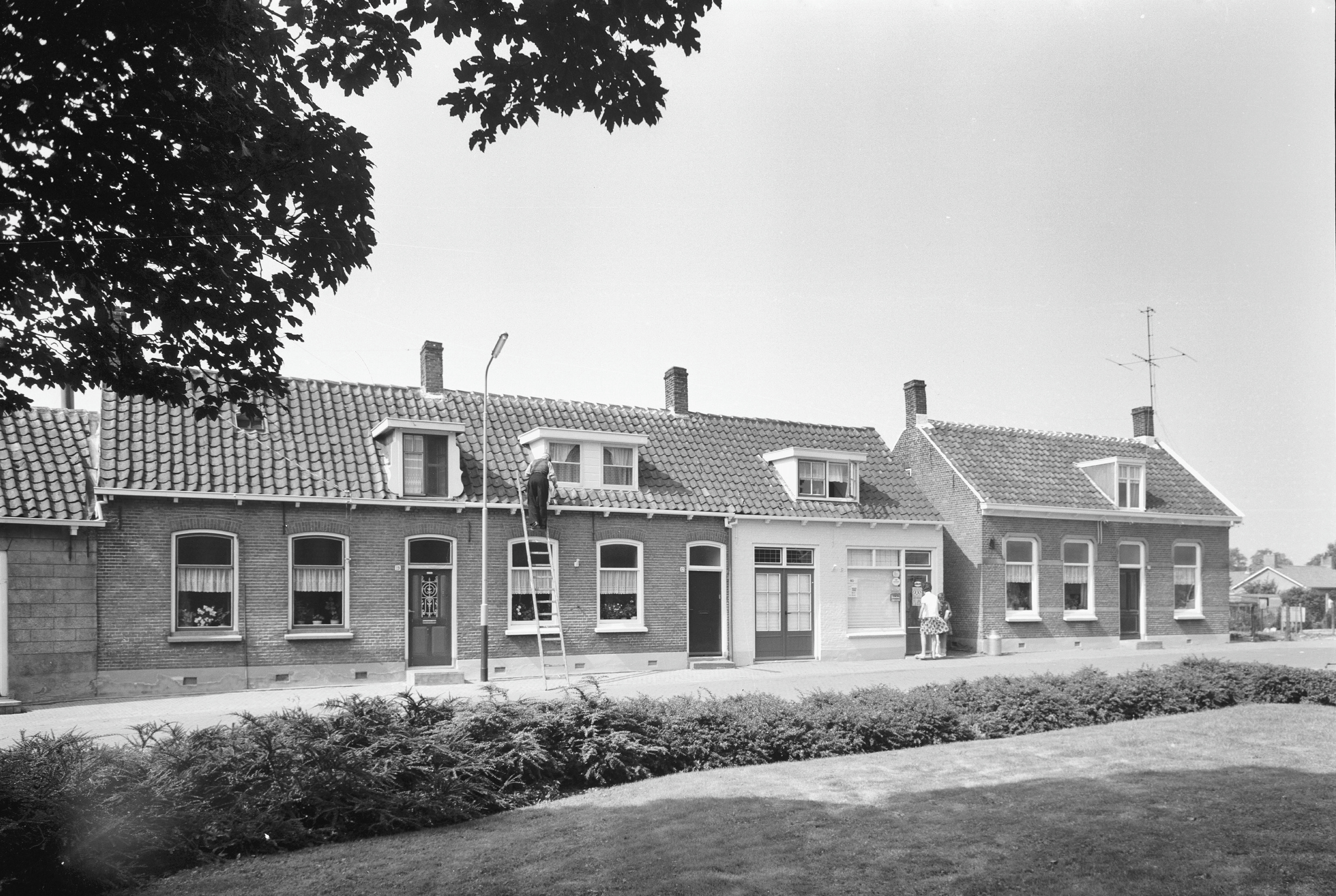
Street view (1964)

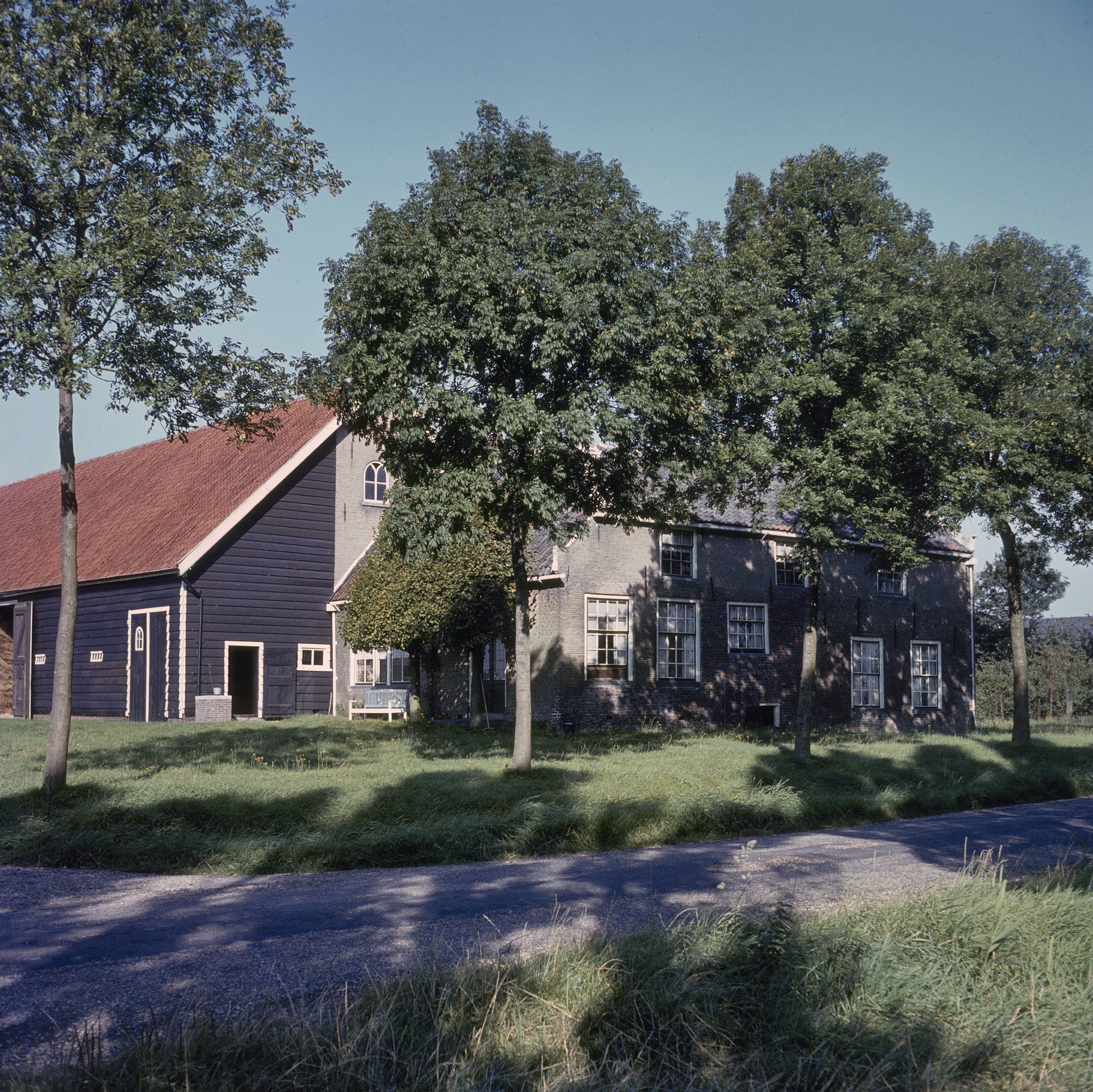
Farm in 's-Heer Arendskerke
