= Katseveer =

Coordinates: 51°32′23.47″N 3°52′12.64″E

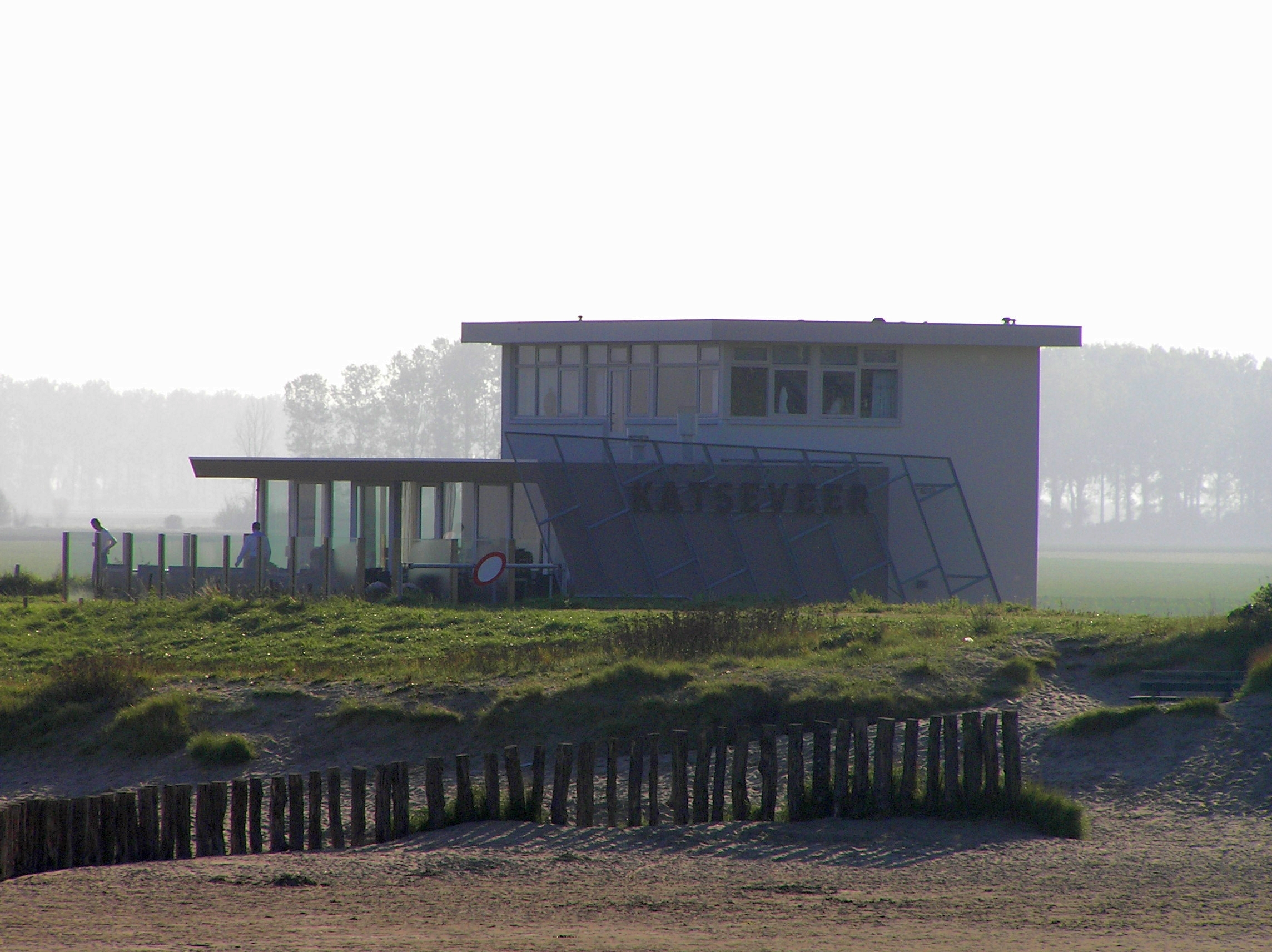
- Interactive map of Katseveer

Restaurant information
- Head chef: Rutger van der Weel
- Food type: French, Mediterranean, regional
- Rating: Michelin Guide
- Location: Katseveerweg 2, Wilhelminadorp, 4475 PB, Netherlands
- Seating capacity: 40
- Website: Official website

Katseveer is a restaurant in Wilhelminadorp, Netherlands. It is a fine dining restaurant that was awarded one Michelin star from 2006 to 2023, when it was revoked due to an ownership change.

GaultMillau awarded the restaurant 16 out of 20 points.

Head chef of Katseveer is Rutger van der Weel.

Restaurant Katseveer is a member of the Alliance Gastronomique Néerlandaise since December 2011.

In 2011, the historic ferry house got a complete overhaul. Part of the overhaul was the extension of the number of seats from 28 to 42, turning the dining room to face the Oosterschelde and modernisation of the kitchen. During the overhaul the restaurant was moved to the former location of 't Veerhuis in Wolphaartsdijk. Because the restaurant is part of the primary sea defences, the overhaul had to be discussed with the local water board.

== History ==
The building is the ferry house from several former ferry lines, including lines to Kortgene and Zierikzee. In that period the building was a tavern. With the realisation of the Delta Works, the ferry lines started to decline. After losing the connection to Kortgene in 1960 due to the inauguration of the Zandkreekdam between Noord-Beveland and Zuid-Beveland, the end of the ferry came in 1965 with the opening of the Zeeland Bridge. That bridge provided a direct car connection between Middelburg, Zuid-Beveland and Zierikzee, Schouwen-Duiveland.

After losing its function as ferry house the building was slowly transformed from tavern to restaurant. In 1969, owner Nico Van der Wolff turned it into a bistro. After 1996, the new owner Erik van Dalen turned it into a fine dining restaurant. In 2003, he sold the restaurant to Rutger en Jessica van der Weel. They became owners of the building in 2008.

== See also ==
- List of Michelin starred restaurants in the Netherlands
