= Wilhelminadorp =

- Village
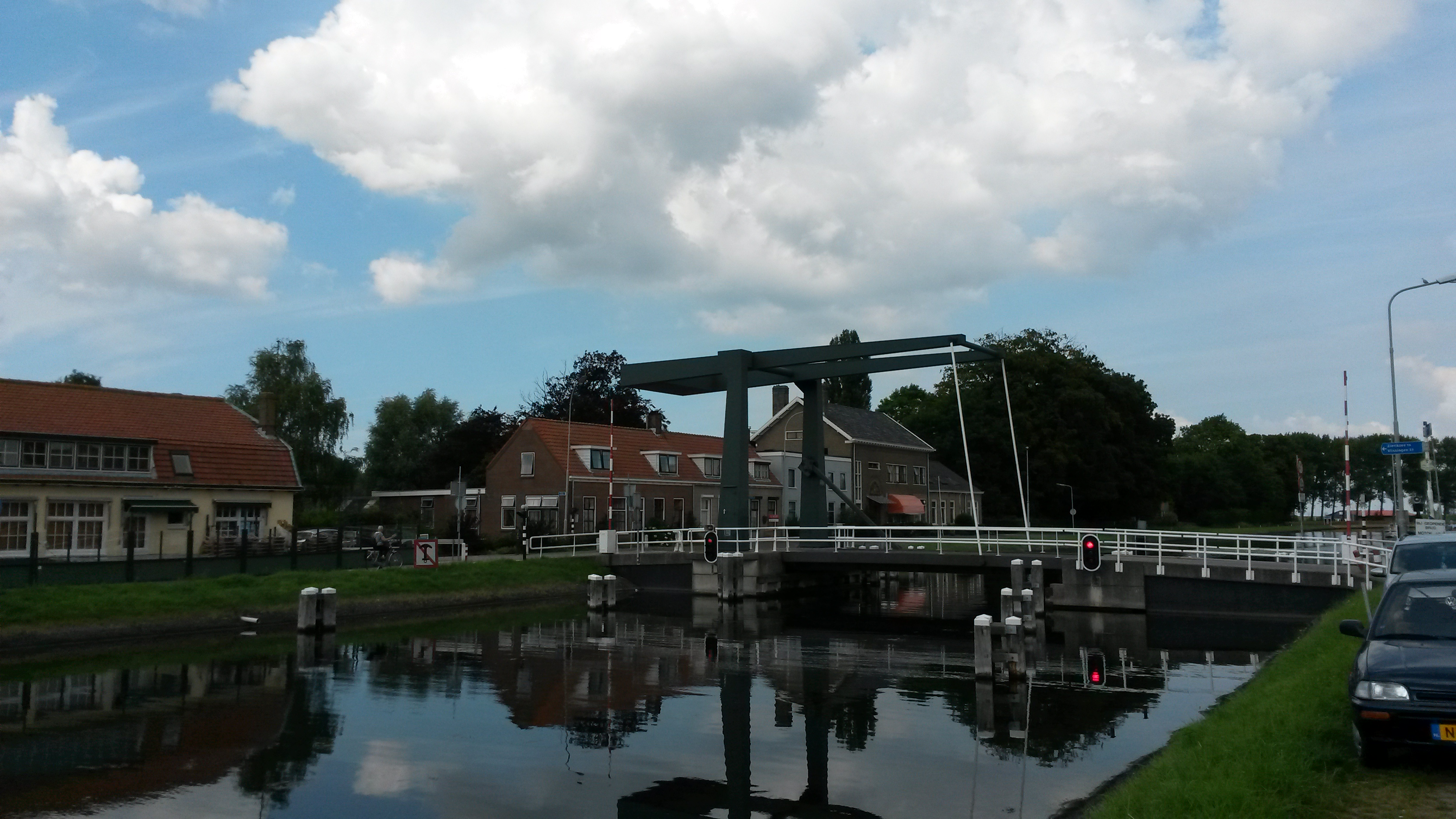
- Drawbridge in Wilhelminadorp

- Location in the province of Zeeland in the Netherlands Wilhelminadorp (Netherlands)
- Coordinates: 51°31′40″N 3°53′46″E
- Country: Netherlands
- Province: Zeeland
- Municipality: Goes
- Established: 1812

Area
  - Total: 10.66 km^{2} (4.12 sq mi)
- Elevation: 2.2 m (7.2 ft)

Population (2021)
  - Total: 800
  - Density: 75/km^{2} (190/sq mi)
- Time zone: UTC+1 (CET)
  - Summer (DST): UTC+2 (CEST)
- Postal code: 4474 & 4475
- Dialing code: 0113

Wilhelminadorp is a village in the Dutch province of Zeeland. It is located in the municipality of Goes.

Wilhelminadorp was founded in 1812, when the Wilhelminapolder was diked. Originally the polder was named Lodewijkspolder, after then King of Holland Louis Bonaparte who had given the permit to start work. With the restoration of the House of Orange, the name was changed in 1815. The polder was now named after Wilhelmina of Prussia, wife of William I of the Netherlands.

Restaurant Katseveer (one Michelin star) is located in the village.

== History ==
The village was first mentioned in 1849 as "Wilhelminadorp, veelal het Nieuwedorp genoemd". Wilhelminadorp is located on the canal from Goes to Goese Sas. All the land in the polder is owned by De Koninklijke Maatschap de Wilhelminapolder. The company owns 1,700 hectares (4,200 acres) of land of which 1,300 hectares (3,200 acres) is used for agricultural. It is one of the largest landowners of the Netherlands.

Wilhelminadorp was home to 501 people in 1840. In 1841, a church was built by Rijkswaterstaat, but the company paid for the church. It was originally part of the municipality of Kattendijke, however the town hall was located in Wilhelminadorp. In 1970, it was merged into the municipality of Goes.

== Gallery ==
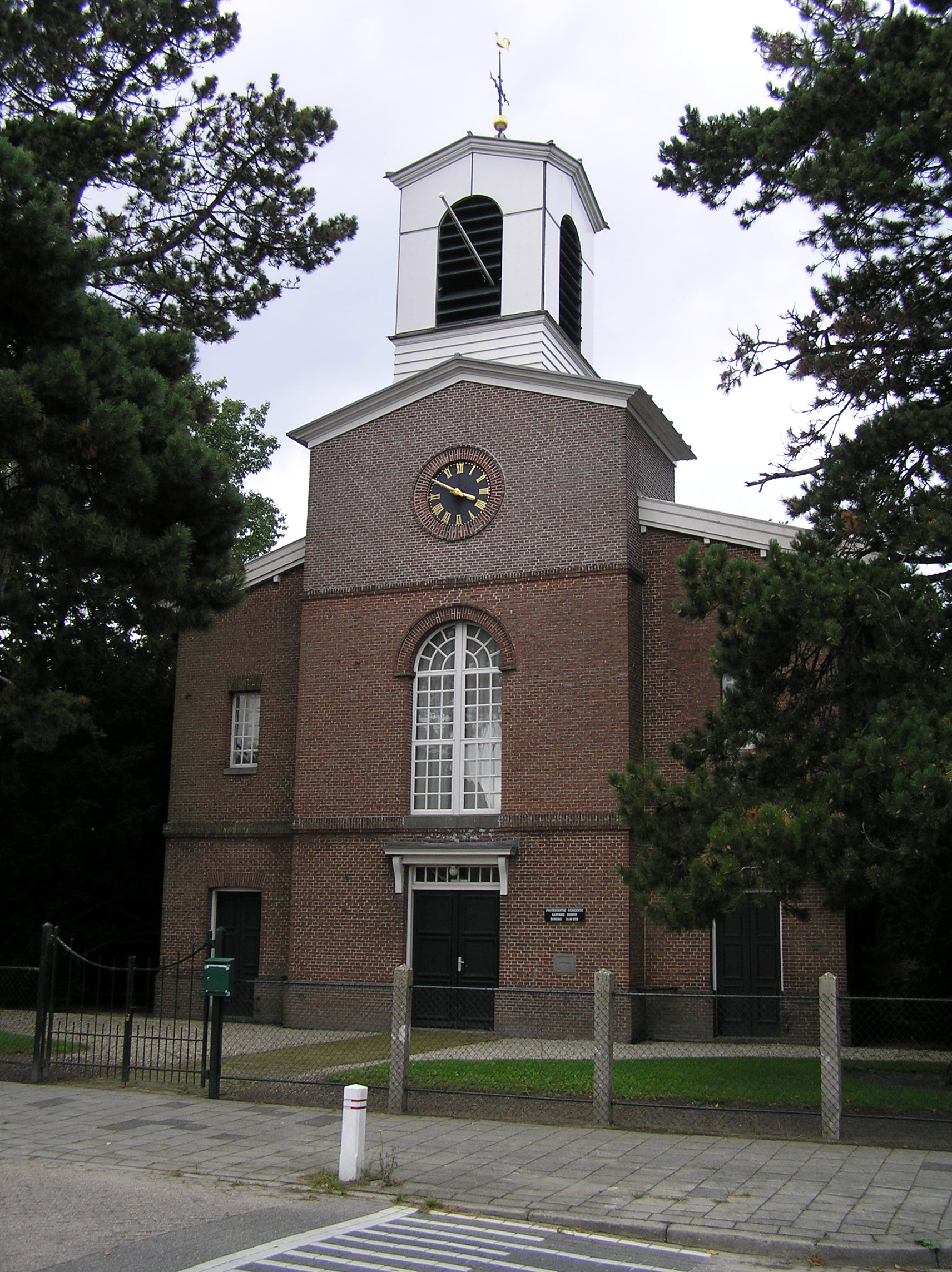
Dutch Reformed church

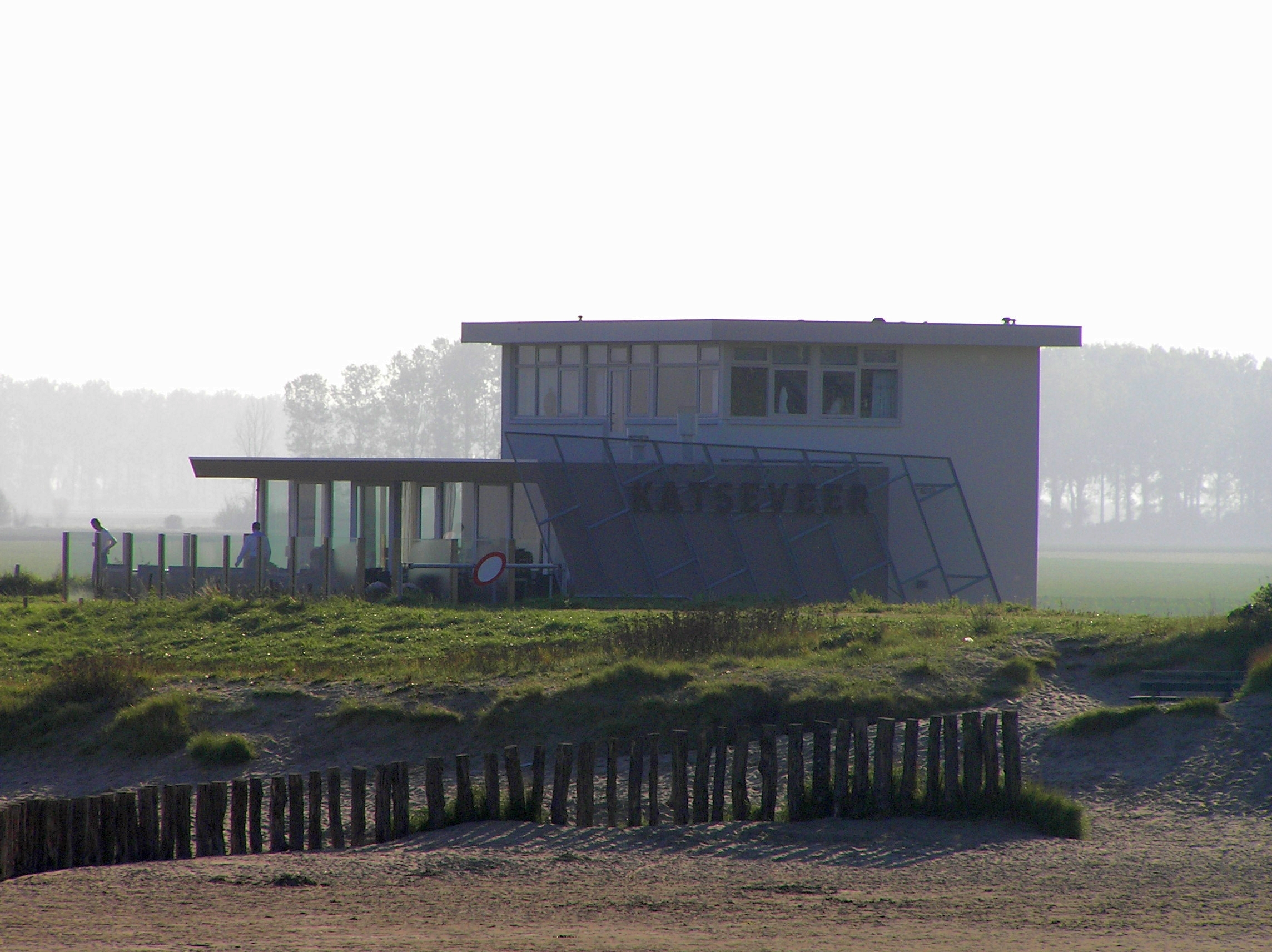
Former ferry house and restaurant Katseveer
