= 's-Heer Hendrikskinderen =

- Village
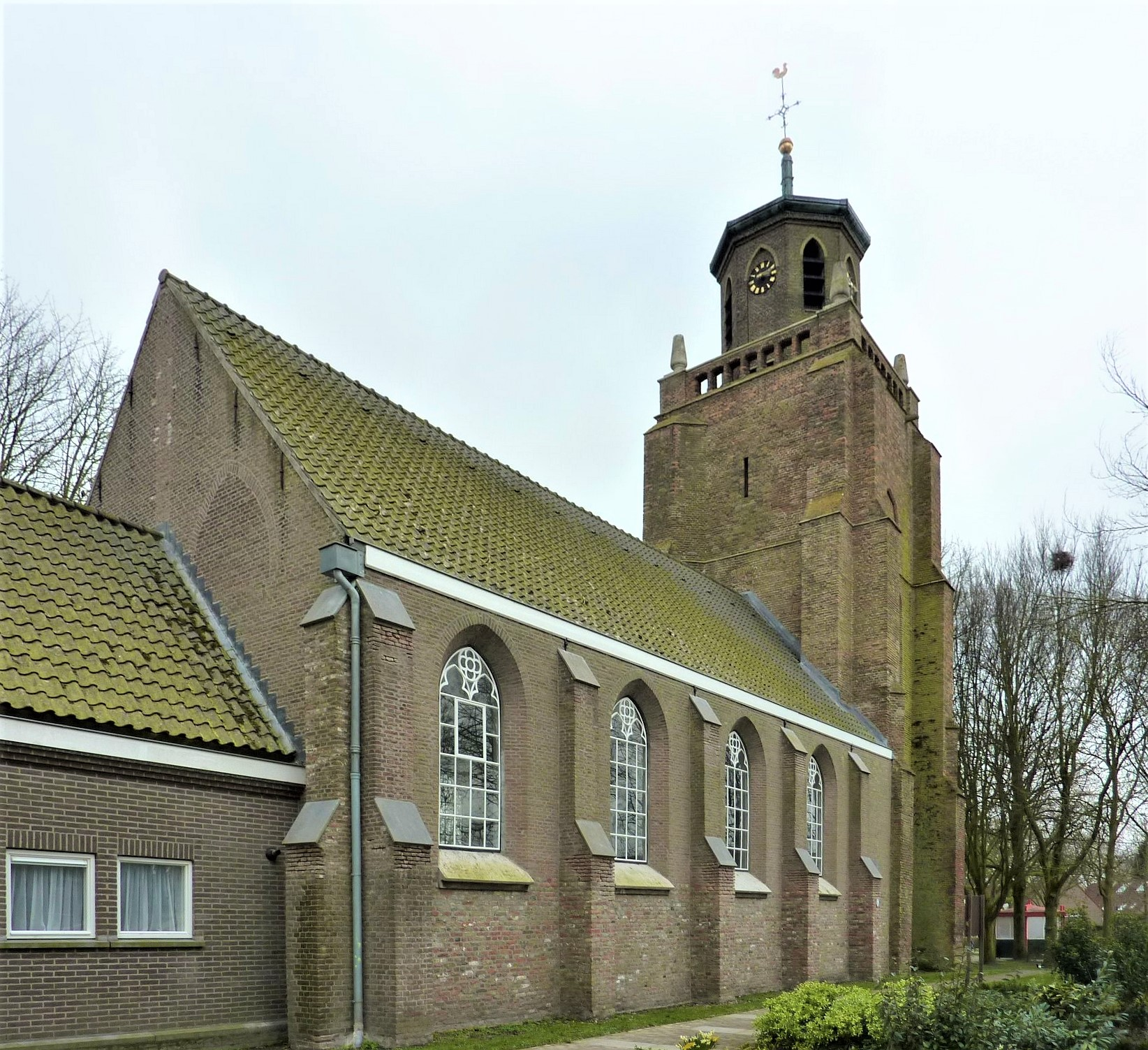
- Protestant church

- Coat of arms

- Location in the province of Zeeland in the Netherlands 's-Heer Hendrikskinderen (Netherlands) 's-Heer Hendrikskinderen (Europe)
- Coordinates: 51°30′6″N 3°51′38″E
- Country: Netherlands
- Province: Zeeland
- Municipality: Goes

Area
  - Total: 9.52 km^{2} (3.68 sq mi)
- Elevation: 0.9 m (3.0 ft)

Population (2021)
  - Total: 1,295
  - Density: 136/km^{2} (352/sq mi)
- Time zone: UTC+1 (CET)
  - Summer (DST): UTC+2 (CEST)
- Postal code: 4472
- Dialing code: 0113

's-Heer Hendrikskinderen is a village in the municipality of Goes, about 2 km to the west of the city of Goes in the Dutch province of Zeeland.

== History ==
In 1198, when Dirk VII, Count of Holland made a donation to Middelburg Abbey, the lords of Schengen, brothers Arnold and Henry, were attested as Arnoldus et Henricus de Scinge. They both seem to have founded a church named after themselves: Ecclesia Arnoldi and Ecclesiam Henrici, now the villages of 's-Heer Arendskerke and 's-Heer Hendrikskinderen.

This village was first mentioned in 1267 as Ecclesiam Henrici, meaning "(private) church of Lord Henric", and is probably a reference to Henricus de Scinge. 's-Heer Hendrikskinderen is a circular village around a church which developed in the Late Middle Ages.

The Dutch Reformed church dates from the 15th century. The tower is probably incomplete. The current church was built in 1805. Castle Heer Hendriksburg used to be located near the village; in the 18th century, it was rebuilt as an inn, and was demolished in 1803.

's-Heer Hendrikskinderen was home to 137 people in 1840. It was a separate municipality until 1857, when it was merged into 's-Heer Arendskerke. In 1970, it became part of the municipality of Goes.

== Gallery ==
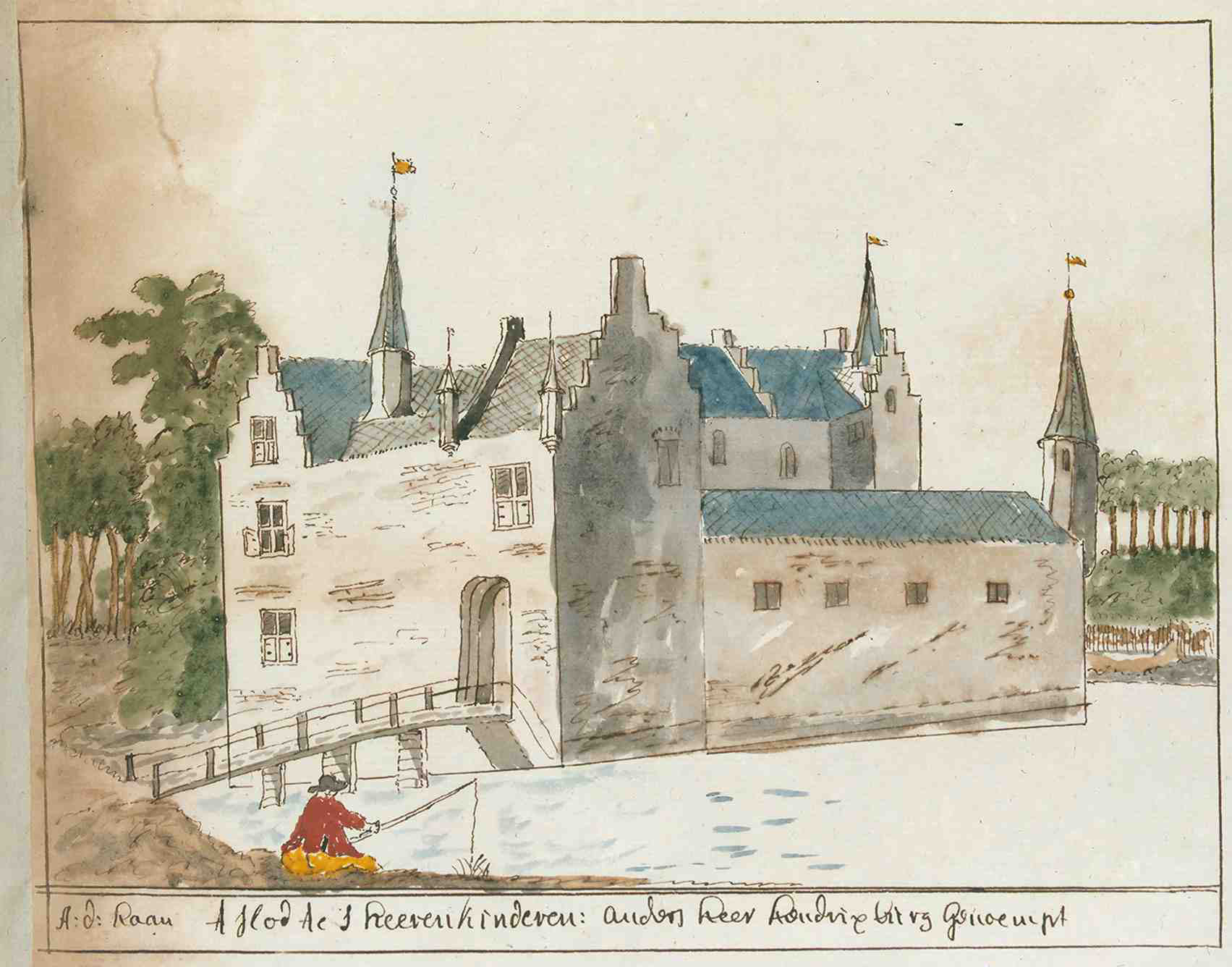
Castle near 's-Heer Hendrikskinderen (1710-1735)

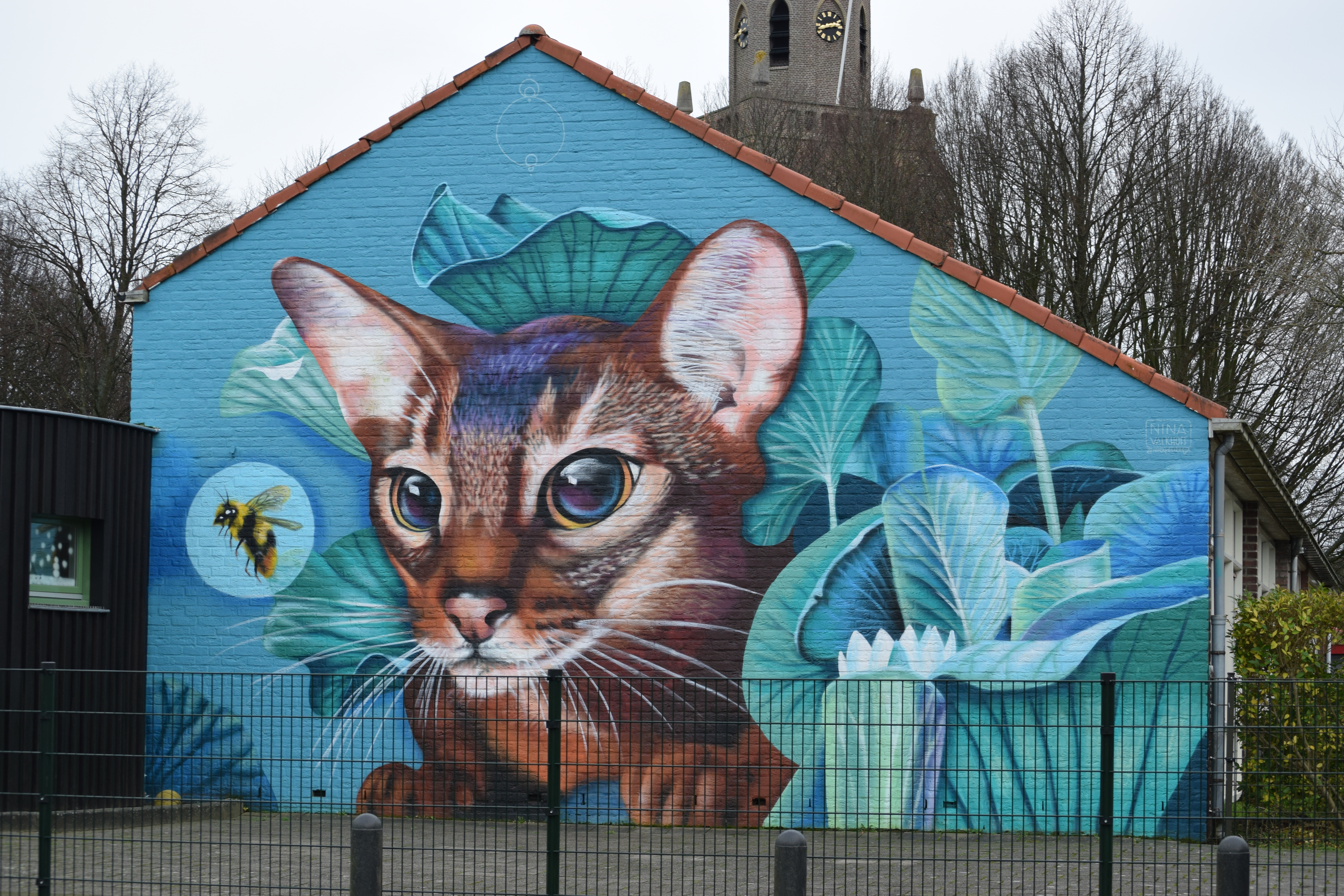
Cat mural in 's-Heer Hendrikskinderen

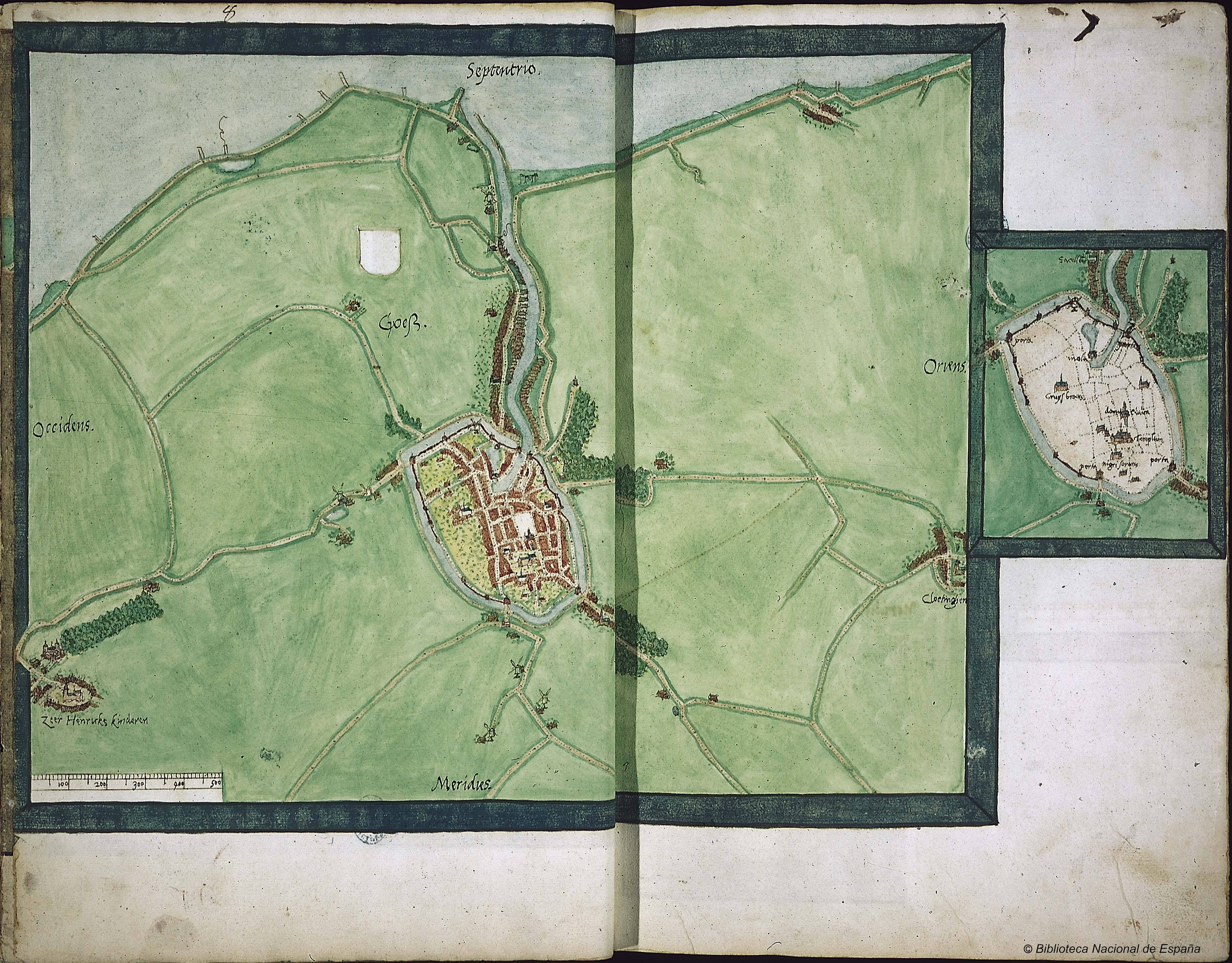
On this 16-century chart of Goes, "Zeer Henriks kinderen" appears in the bottom left corner
