= Goes =

- City and municipality
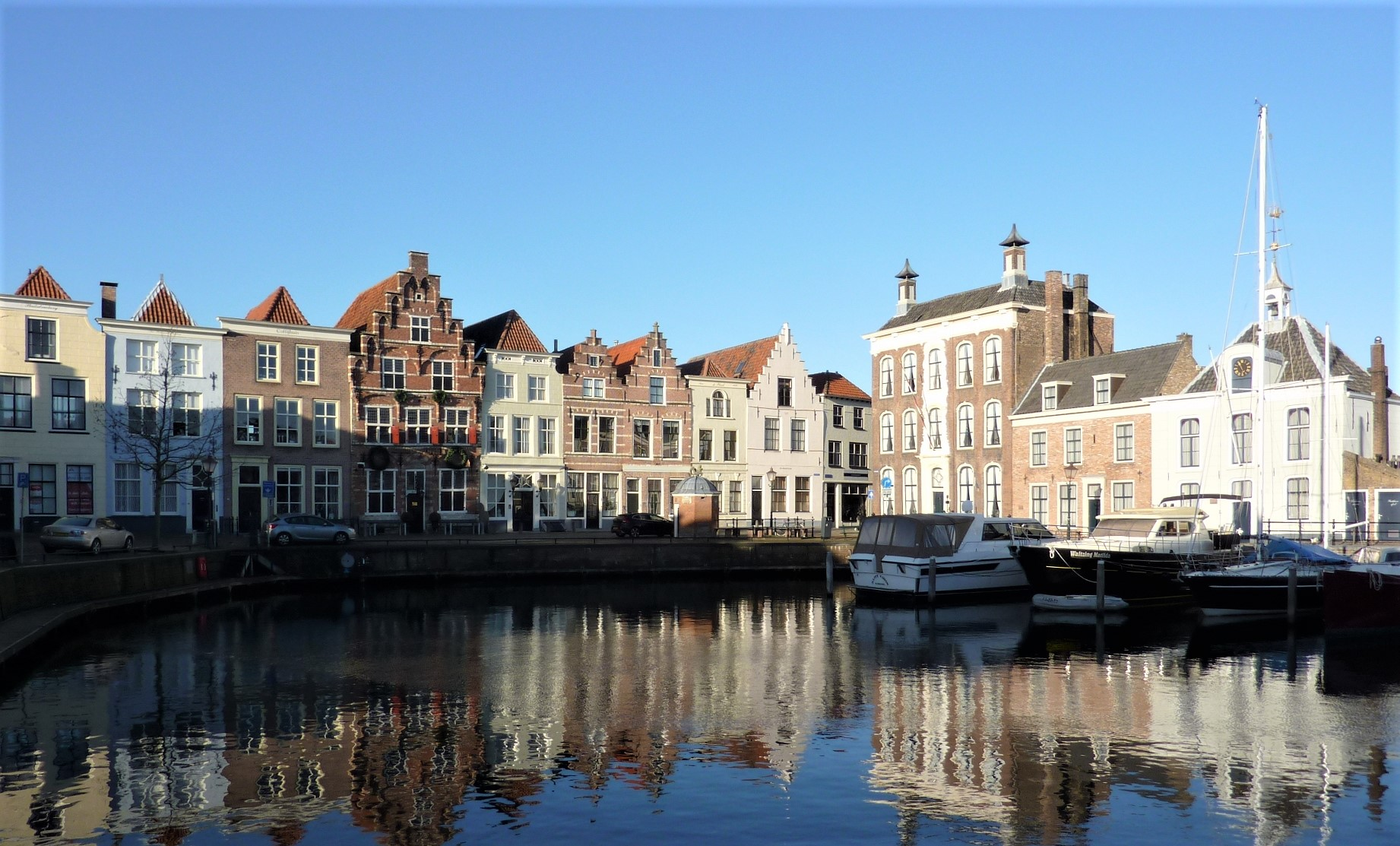
- Turfkade in Goes

- Flag Coat of arms

- Location in Zeeland

- Location within the province of Zeeland Location within the Netherlands Location within Europe
- Coordinates: 51°30′N 3°53′E
- Country: Netherlands
- Province: Zeeland

Government
  - Body: Municipal council
  - Mayor: Cees van den Bos (SGP)

Area
  - Total: 101.92 km^{2} (39.35 sq mi)
  - Land: 92.58 km^{2} (35.75 sq mi)
  - Water: 9.34 km^{2} (3.61 sq mi)
- Elevation: −1 m (−3.3 ft)

Population (January 2021)
  - Total: 38,594
  - Density: 417/km^{2} (1,080/sq mi)
- Demonym: Goesenaar
- Time zone: UTC+1 (CET)
  - Summer (DST): UTC+2 (CEST)
- Postcode: 4460–4483
- Area code: 0113
- Website: goes.nl

Goes (Dutch pronunciation: [ɣus]) is a city and municipality in the southwestern Netherlands on Zuid-Beveland, in the province of Zeeland. The city of Goes has approximately 29,000 residents.

== History ==
Goes was founded in the 10th century on the edge of a creek: de Korte Gos (the Short Gos). The village grew fast, and in the early 12th century it had a market square and a church devoted to Mary Magdalene. By 1300, it had a brick castle, now known as Oostende Castle.

In 1405, Goes received city rights from William II, Duke of Bavaria, by his right as count of Holland, and in 1417, it was allowed to build town walls. The prosperity of the city was based upon the cloth industry and the production of salt. In the 16th century, Goes declined. Its connection to the sea silted up and in 1554 a large fire destroyed part of the city.

In the autumn of 1572, during the course of the Eighty Years' War, Goes, in the Spanish Netherlands, was besieged by Dutch forces with the support of English troops. The siege was relieved in October 1572 by Spanish tercios, who waded across the Scheldt to attack the besieging forces. In 1577, the Spanish soldiers who occupied Goes were driven out by Prince Maurice of Nassau. The prince built a defence wall around Goes, which is still partly standing. From the 17th century, Goes did not play an important role, except as an agricultural centre. In 1868, a railway was constructed through it, but this did not lead to industrialisation. Agriculture remains the most important economic activity.

Although the Netherlands were neutral in the First World War, seven bombs hit Goes and Kloetinge, due to an error by a British airplane. A house in Magdalenastreet in Goes was destroyed and one person killed. Goes did not suffer extensive damage during the Second World War, but was under German occupation until 1944.

Goes did not experience much population growth until the 1970s and 1980s. Then, the city grew fast because of new districts like Goese Meer, Oostmolenpark, Overzuid and Ouverture being constructed. Goes is now the fourth largest economic centre in Zeeland. New districts are in preparation, amongst them Goese Schans, Mannee and Aria, where 3,000 new houses are to be built.

== Population centers ==
- Eindewege
- Goes
- 's-Heer Arendskerke
- 's-Heer Hendrikskinderen
- Kattendijke
- Kloetinge
- Oud-Sabbinge
- Wilhelminadorp
- Wolphaartsdijk

=== Topography ===
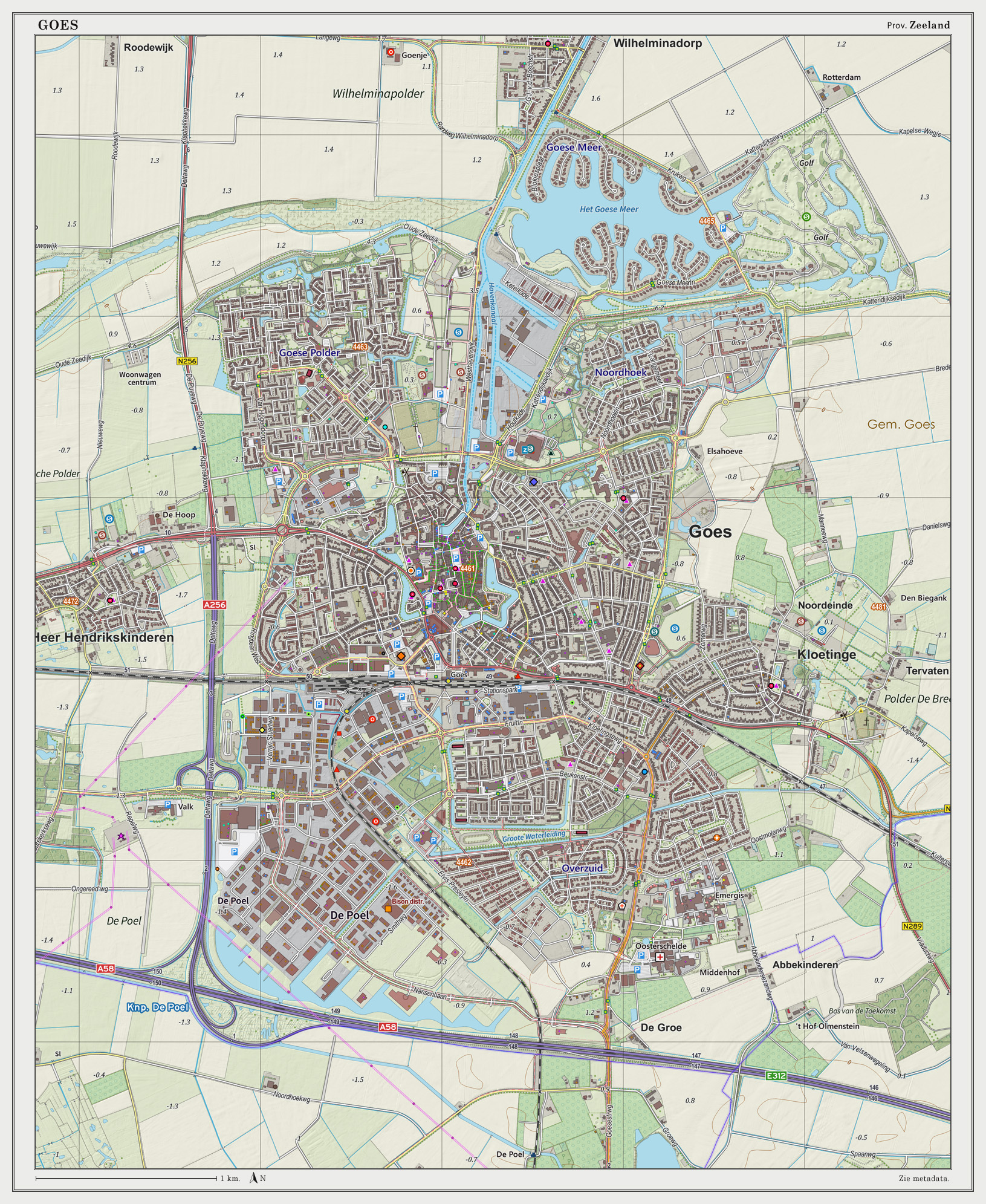

Dutch Topographic map of Goes (town), Sept. 2014.

== Districts ==
- Centre Goes
- West Goes
- New West
- East Goes
- Noordhoek
- Goese Meer
- Goese Polder
- South Goes
- Overzuid
- Ouverture
- De Goese Poort (business area)
- De Poel (I, II, III en IV, business area)
- Klein Frankrijk (business area)
- Marconi (business area)
- Aria (developing)
- Mannee
- Goese Schans (developing)

== Twin towns – sister cities ==
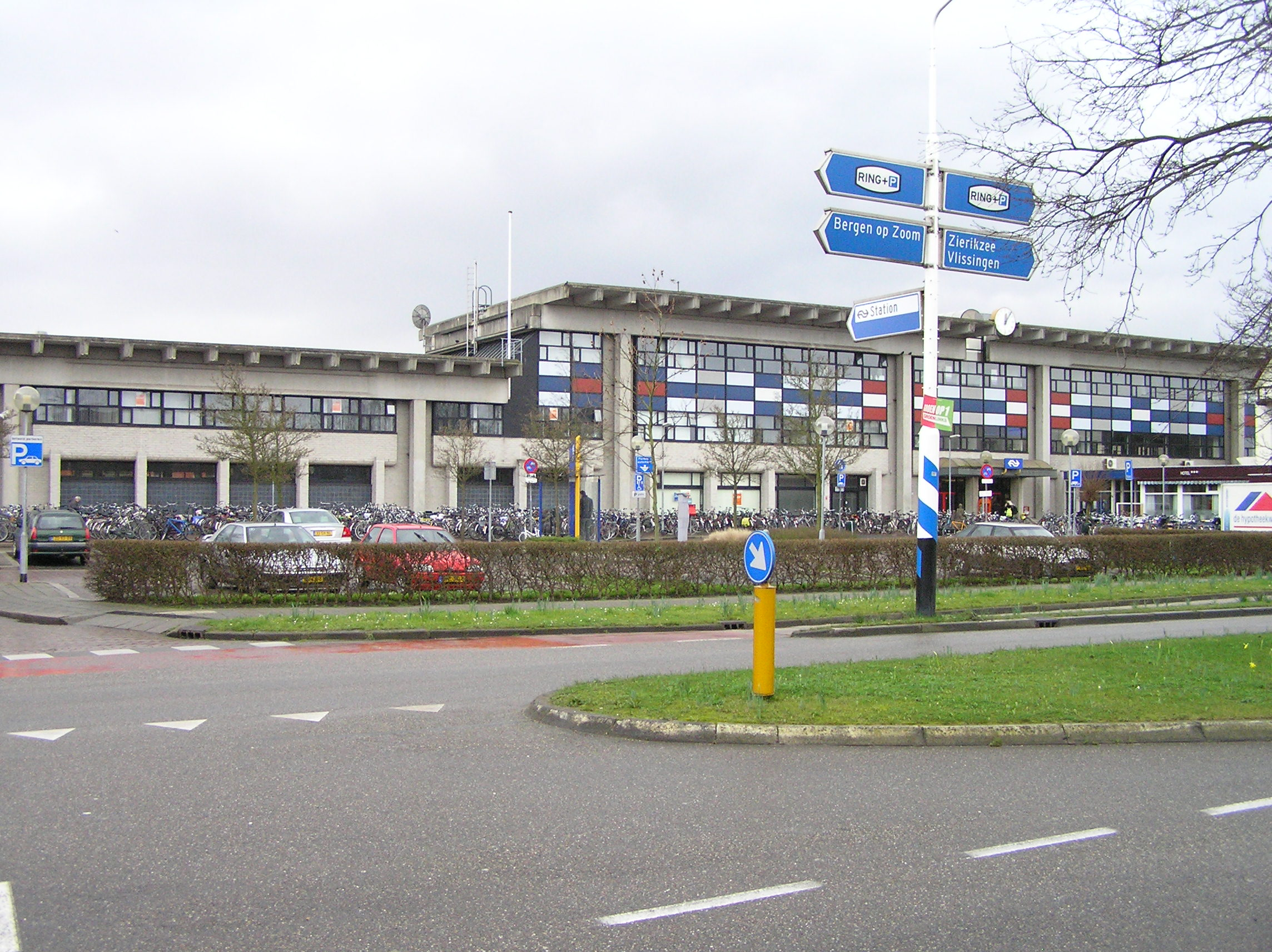
Front of the railway station in Goes

Goes was twinned with Panevėžys, Lithuania.

On 22 July 2021 the town council decided to end the twinning.

== Transport ==
Goes has a railway station located on the Roosendaal–Vlissingen railway.

== Notable people ==
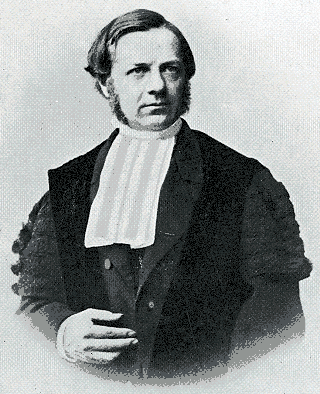
C.H.D. Buys Ballot, 1857

=== Public thinking & service ===
- Cornelis van Watervliet (1592–1636), Mayor of Goes and member of the Court of Audit of Zeeland, buried in De Maria Magdalenakerk
- Cornelis Caesar (c. 1610–1657), merchant and governor of Formosa
- C. H. D. Buys Ballot (1817–1890), chemist and meteorologist, invented Buys Ballot's law
- Isaäc Dignus Fransen van de Putte (1822–1902), politician
- Jacob Adriaan de Wilde (1879–1956), politician and jurist
- Pieter Jacobus Wemelsfelder (1907–1995), hydraulic engineer
- Leendert Ginjaar (1928–2003), politician and chemist
- Bas van Fraassen (born 1941), philosopher
- Albert J. R. Heck (born 1964), scientist and academic
- Katinka Simonse (born 1979) known as Tinkebell, artist

=== The arts ===
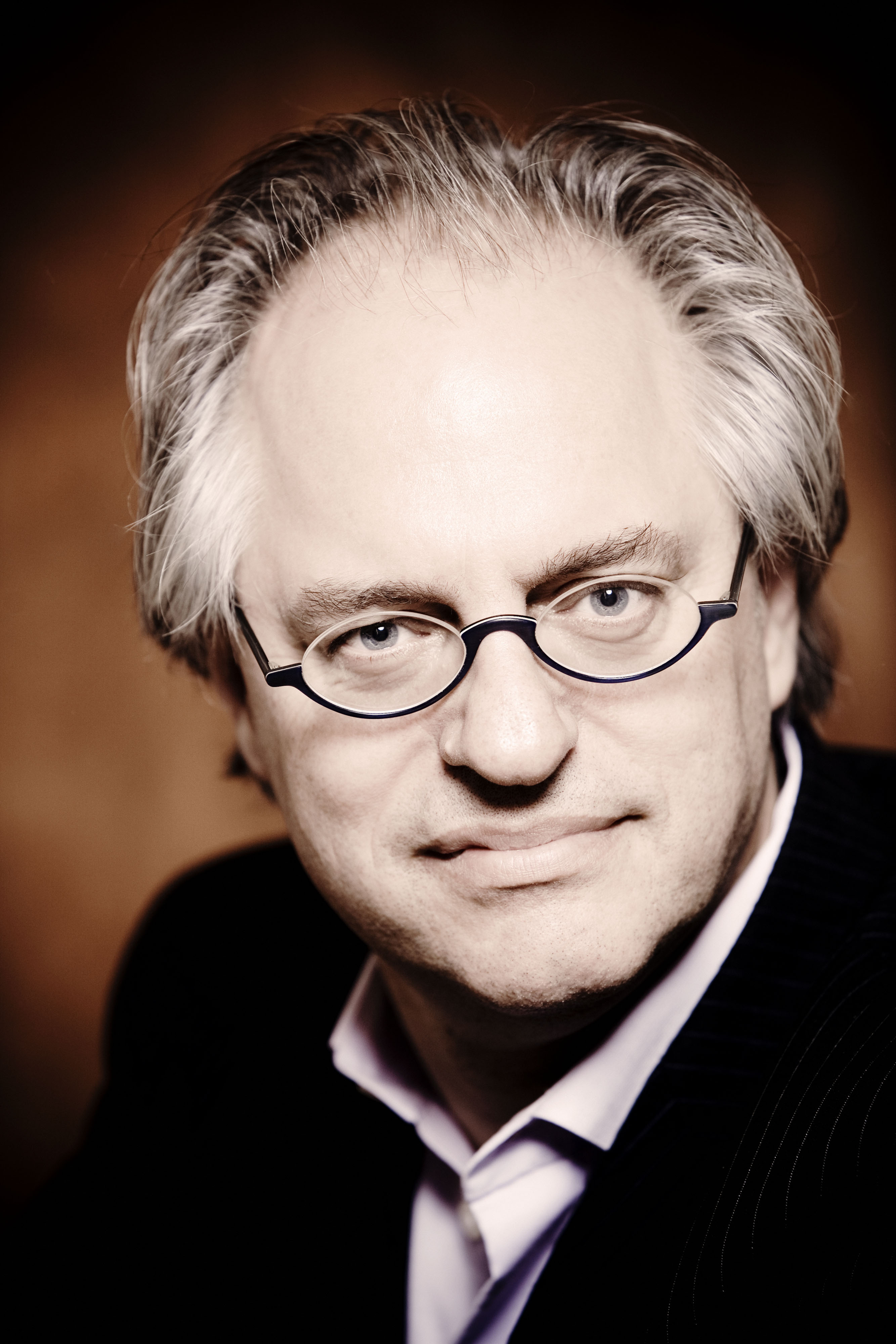
Leo van Doeselaar, 2007

- Willem Eversdijck (c. 1620–1671), Golden Age painter
- Pieter Peutemans (1641–1698), Golden Age painter
- Pieter Adriaan Jacobus Moojen (1879- 1955), architect, painter and writer
- Leo van Doeselaar (born 1954), classical organist and conductor
- Boudewijn Vincent Bonebakker (born 1968) and Frank Harthoorn, guitarists of Gorefest
- Frank Nitzinsky (Eye-D) (born 1974), music producer and DJ, one half of The Outside Agency
- Noël Wessels (DJ Hidden) (born 1975), music producer and DJ, one-half of The Outside Agency
- Jesse van de Ketterij (unknown birth year), music producer and DJ, one-half of Pep & Rash
- Rachid El Uarichi (unknown birth year), music producer and DJ, one-half of Pep & Rash

=== Sports ===
- Myrna Veenstra (born 1975), former field hockey player, bronze medallist at the 2000 Summer Olympics
- Martijn Dieleman (born 1979), former Dutch volleyball player, competed at the 2000 Summer Olympics
- Lesley Pattinama Kerkhove (born 1991), tennis player
- Consus, winner of the 2023 GeoGuessr World Cup

== Gallery ==
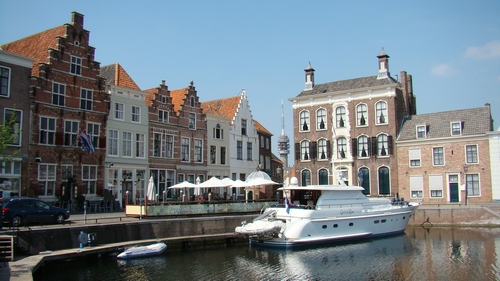
City harbor of Goes

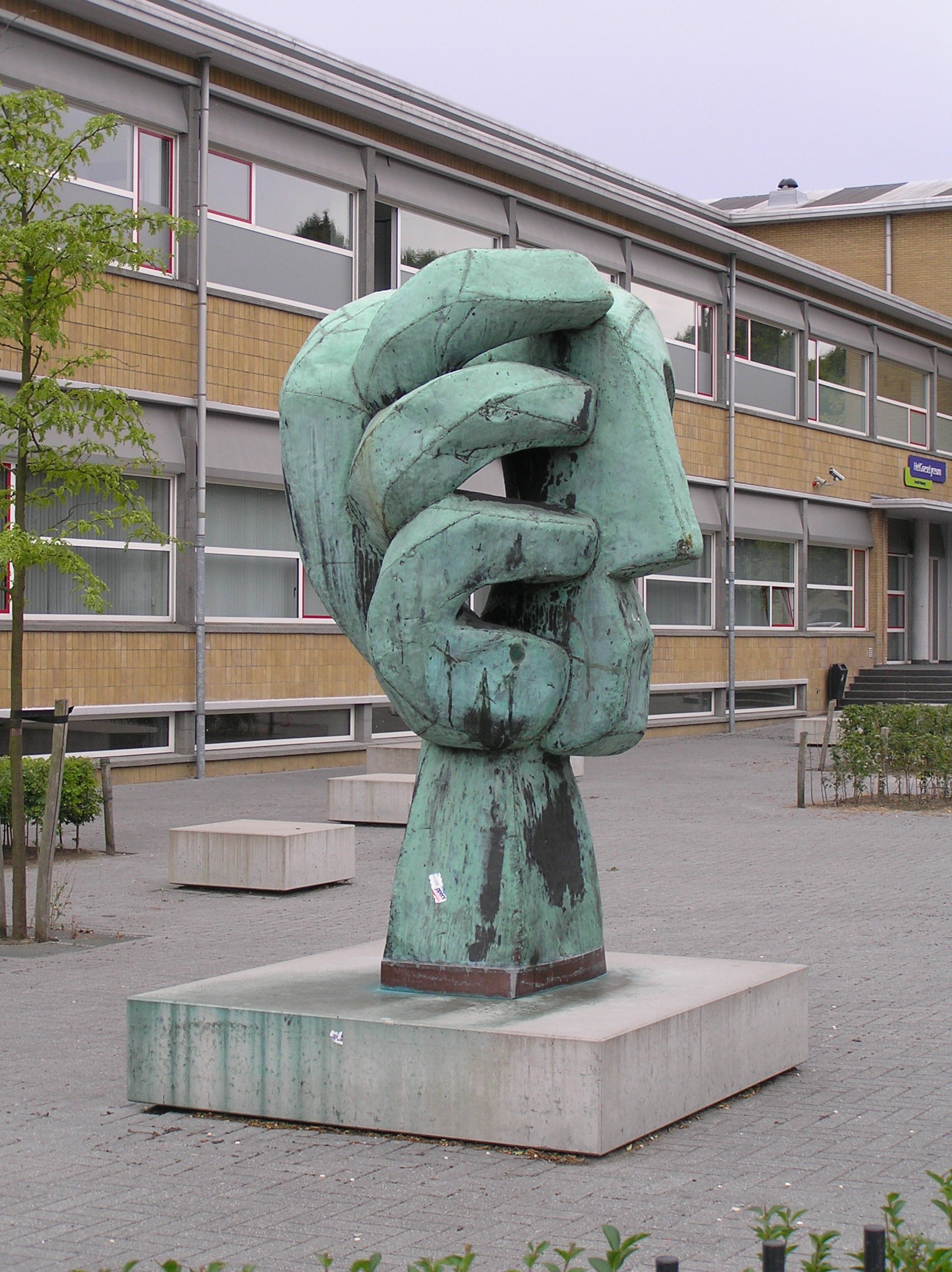
Beeld Bergweg

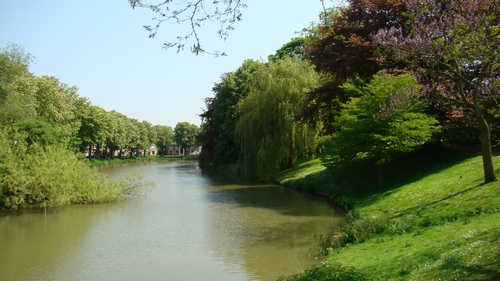
De veste (canal) in Goes

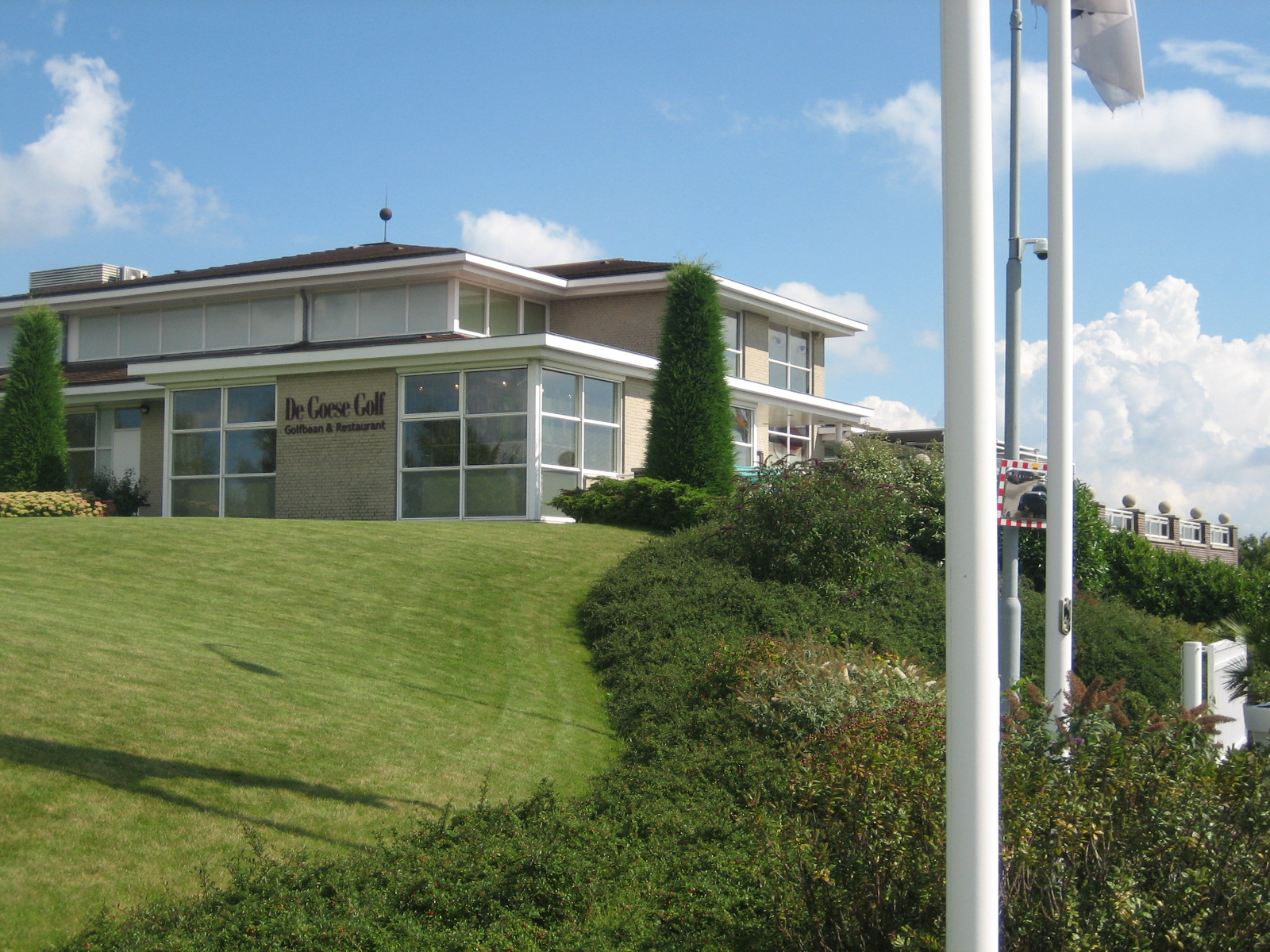
Goese Golf Clubhuis

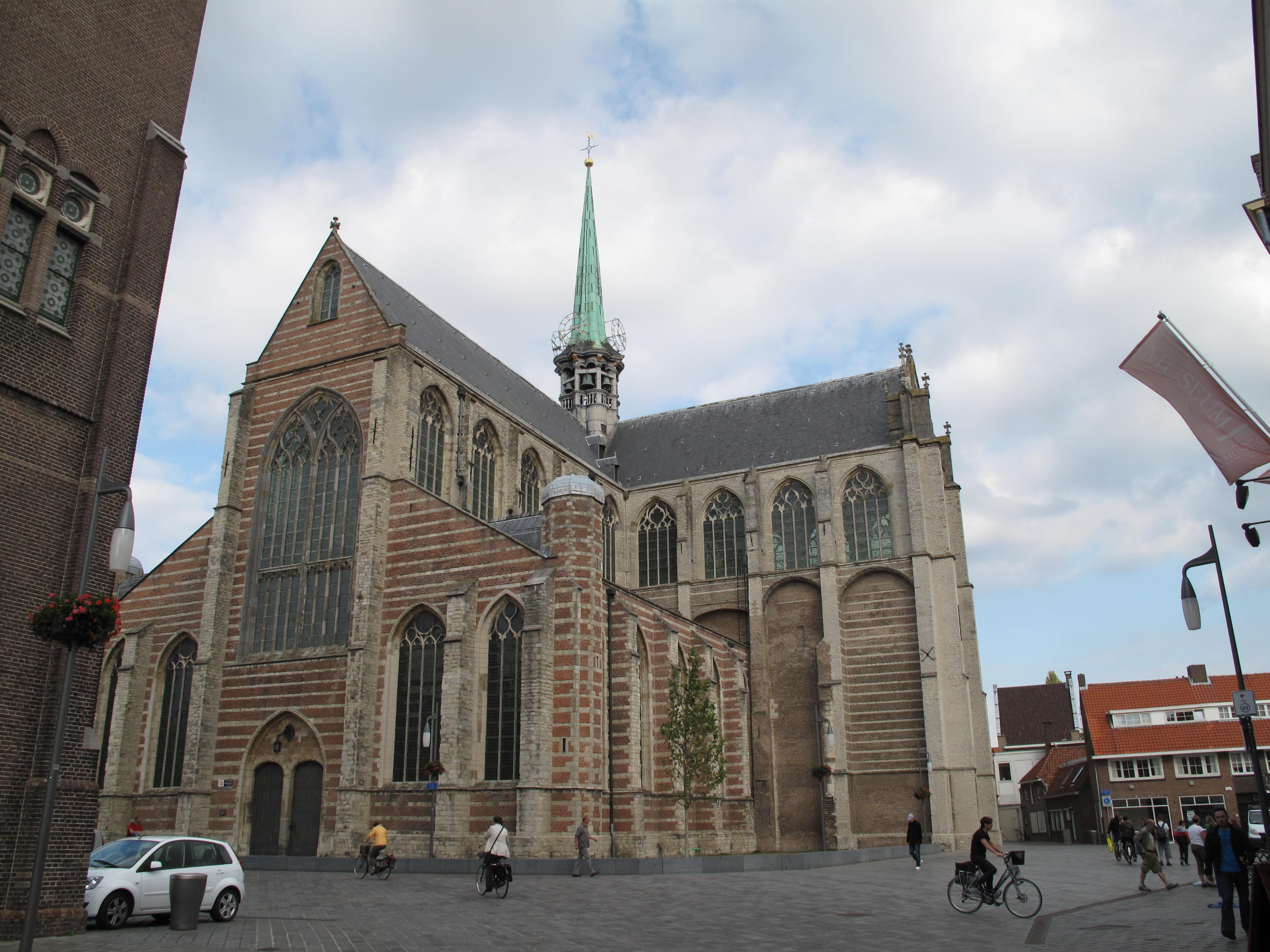
De Maria Magdalenakerk

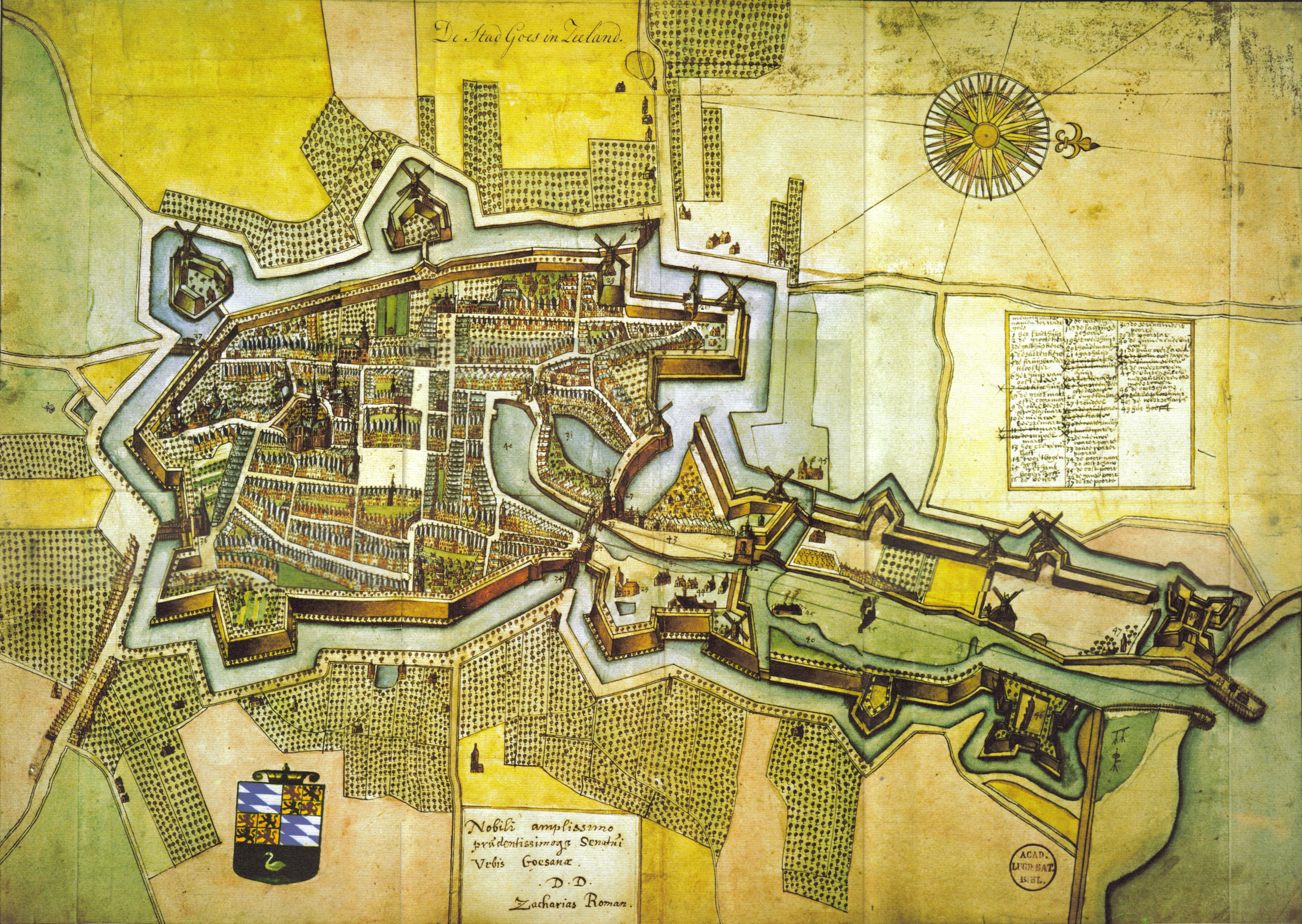
Late Medieval Goes with ravelin

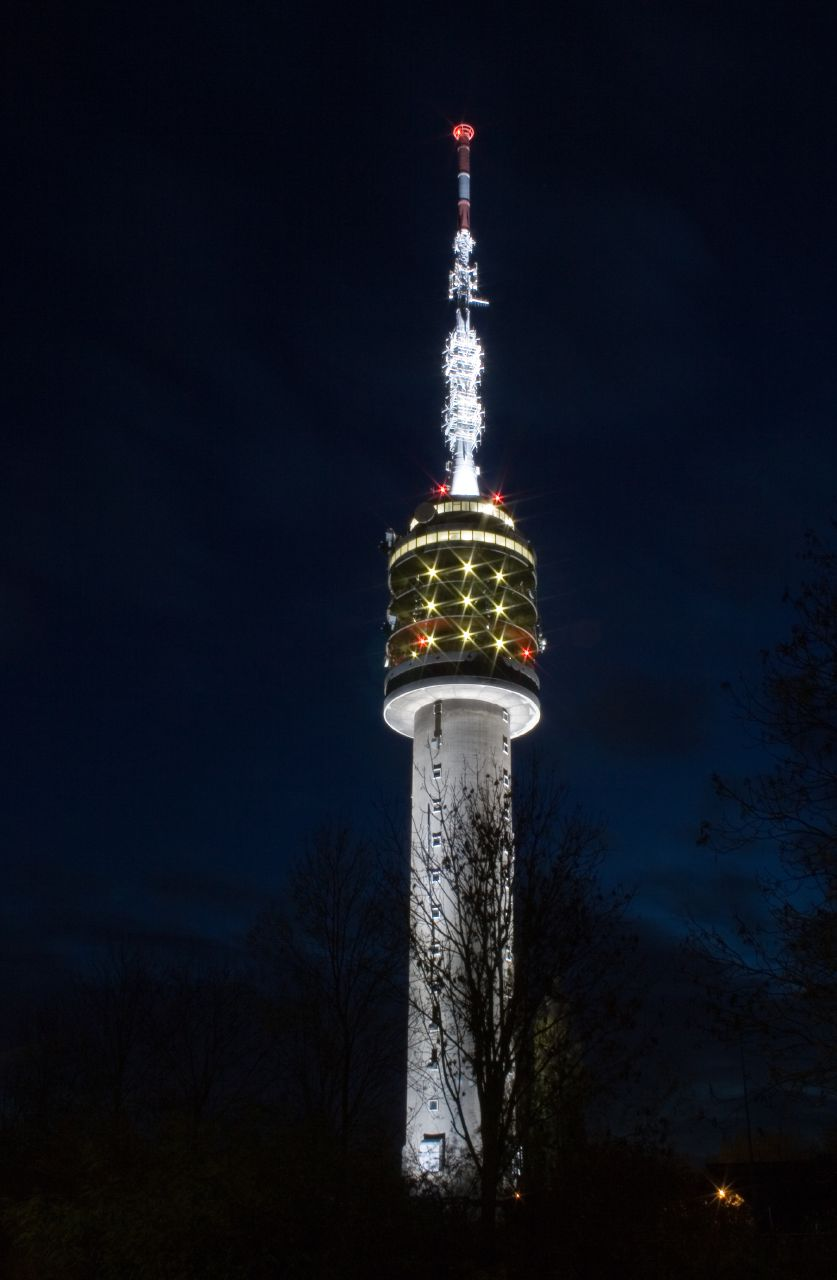
TV tower

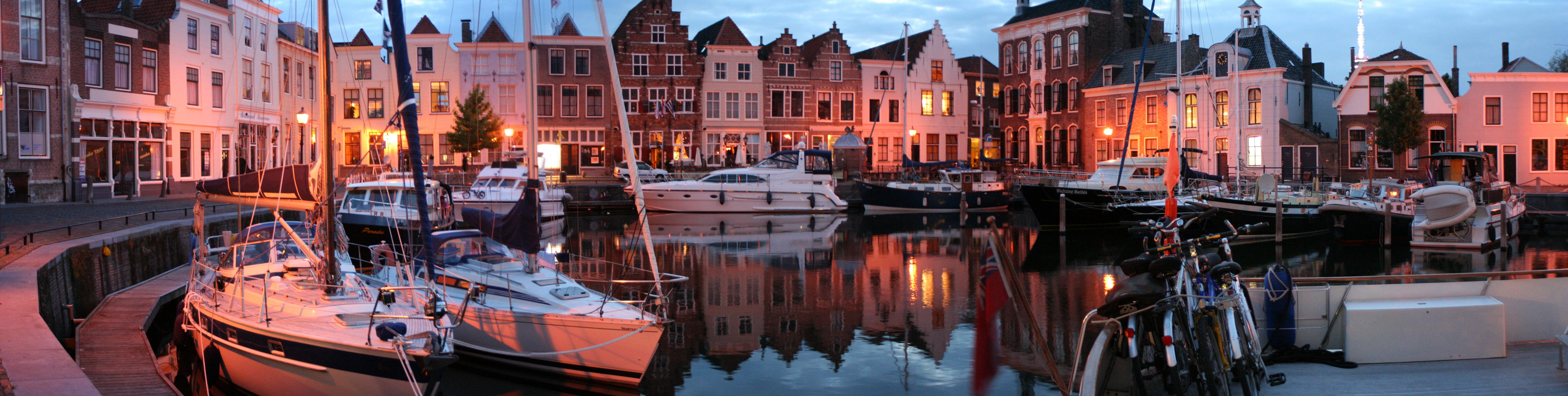
Harbor of Goes
