= Bergen op Zoom railway station =

Railway station in the Netherlands

Bergen op Zoom
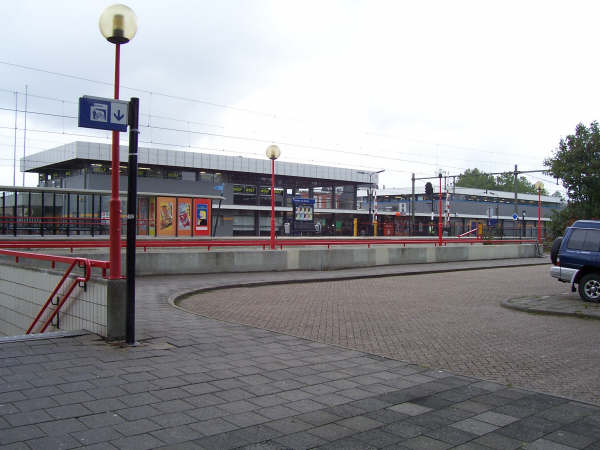
- Bergen op Zoom railway station

General information
- Location: Netherlands
- Coordinates: 51°29′41″N 4°17′46″E
- Line: Roosendaal–Vlissingen railway
- Connections: Arriva: 22, 23, 25, 100, 104, 105, 111, 112, 310, 614; Connexxion: 102, 107, 108, 209, 603

Other information
- Station code: Bgn

History
- Opened: 23 December 1863

Services
Preceding station	Nederlandse Spoorwegen	Following station
Rilland-Bath towards Vlissingen	NS Intercity 2200	Roosendaal towards Amsterdam Centraal
Goes towards Vlissingen	NS Intercity 2300 Mon-Fri until 20:00	Roosendaal towards Amsterdam Centraal
Location
- Location within Netherlands

Bergen op Zoom is a railway station located in Bergen op Zoom, Netherlands. The station was opened on 23 December 1863 and is located on the Roosendaal–Vlissingen railway. The services are operated by Nederlandse Spoorwegen.

== Train service ==
The following services currently call at Bergen op Zoom:

- 2x per hour intercity service Amsterdam - Haarlem - Leiden - The Hague - Rotterdam - Dordrecht - Roosendaal - Vlissingen (local service between Roosendaal and Vlissingen)
- 2x per weekday intercity service Roosendaal - Vlissingen (express service between Roosendaal and Vlissingen in the peak direction, only stopping at Middelburg, Goes and Bergen op Zoom. Splits from/Combines with the regular Amsterdam - Vlissingen intercity service at Roosendaal)
