= Arnemuiden railway station =

Railway station in the Netherlands

Arnemuiden
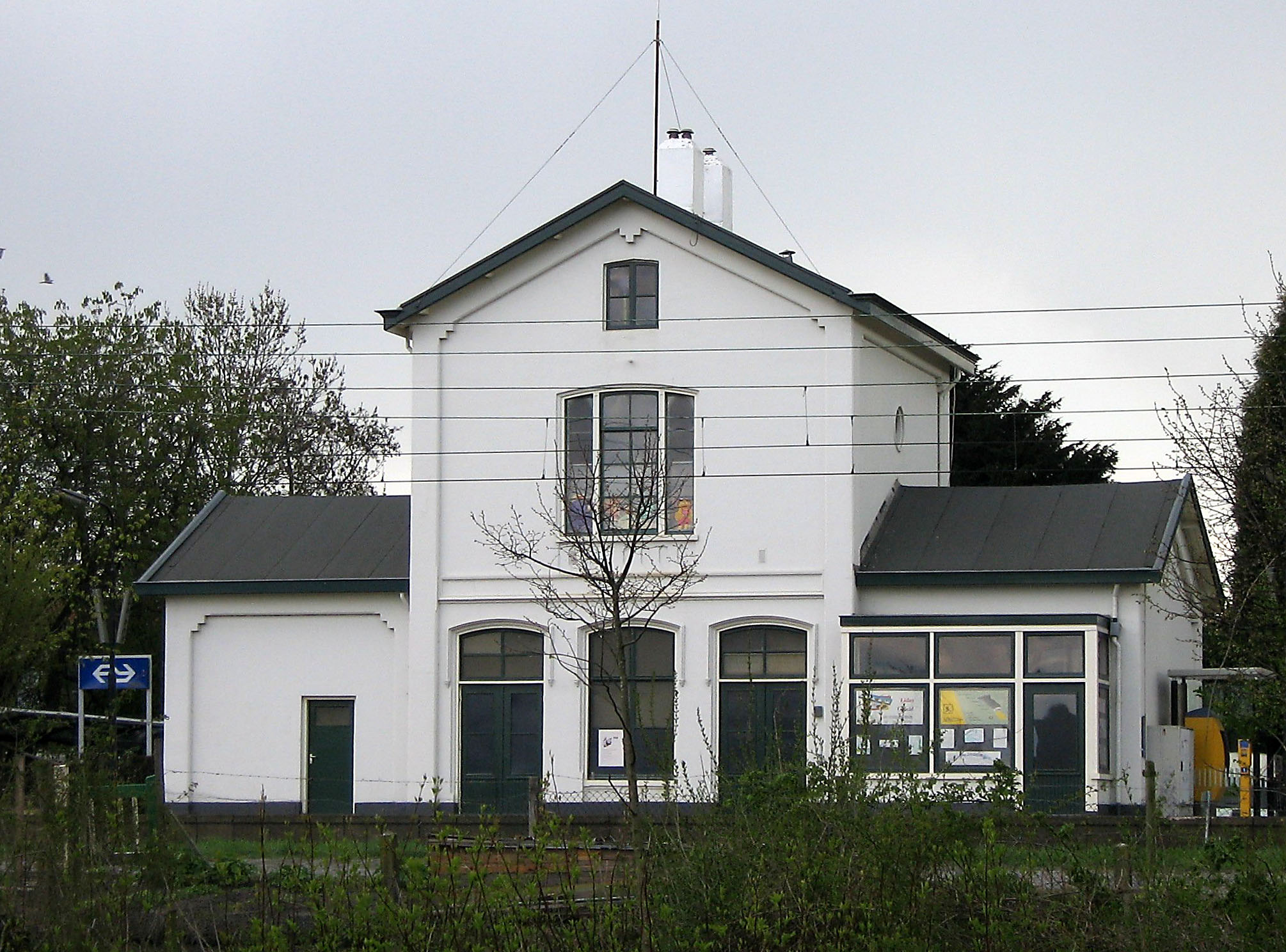

General information
- Location: Netherlands
- Coordinates: 51°30′05″N 3°40′09″E
- Line: Roosendaal–Vlissingen railway
- Connections: None

Other information
- Station code: Arn

History
- Opened: 1 March 1872

Services
Preceding station	Nederlandse Spoorwegen	Following station
Middelburg towards Vlissingen	NS Intercity 2200	Goes towards Amsterdam Centraal
Location
- Location within Netherlands

Arnemuiden is a railway station in Arnemuiden, The Netherlands. The station was opened on 1 March 1872 and is on the Roosendaal–Vlissingen railway. The station is operated by Nederlandse Spoorwegen. When built, the station was on the northern side of the village. The village has now grown further north so the station is now in the centre.

Arnemuiden was basically furnished and consisted only of a station and a small goods shed. In 1877 the yard was extended with a freight siding. The cargo consisted mainly of outgoing fish, shrimp and sugar beet, and receiving coal and food. Until the 1960s, little changed in the yard. In the sixties the sidings gradually fell into disuse. In 1969 they were decommissioned. Since the end of the 1970s, the village has also expanded to the other side of the railway.

As with many small stations on the Zeeland Line, the two platforms do not lie opposite each other, but are on either side of a level crossing.

There are bicycle lockers and two unguarded bicycle parking facilities. There is parking for cars.

== Future ==
In early 2006 NS announced it wanted to remove Arnemuiden, Kapelle-Biezelinge and Krabbendijke from the 2007 timetable. After protests a joint agreement was made for a completely new timetable for Zeeland, calling twice an hour from all stations on the Zeeland line.

== Train service ==
The following services currently call at Arnemuiden:

- 2x per hour intercity service Amsterdam - Haarlem - Leiden - The Hague - Rotterdam - Dordrecht - Roosendaal - Vlissingen
