= Goes railway station =

Railway station in the Netherlands

Goes
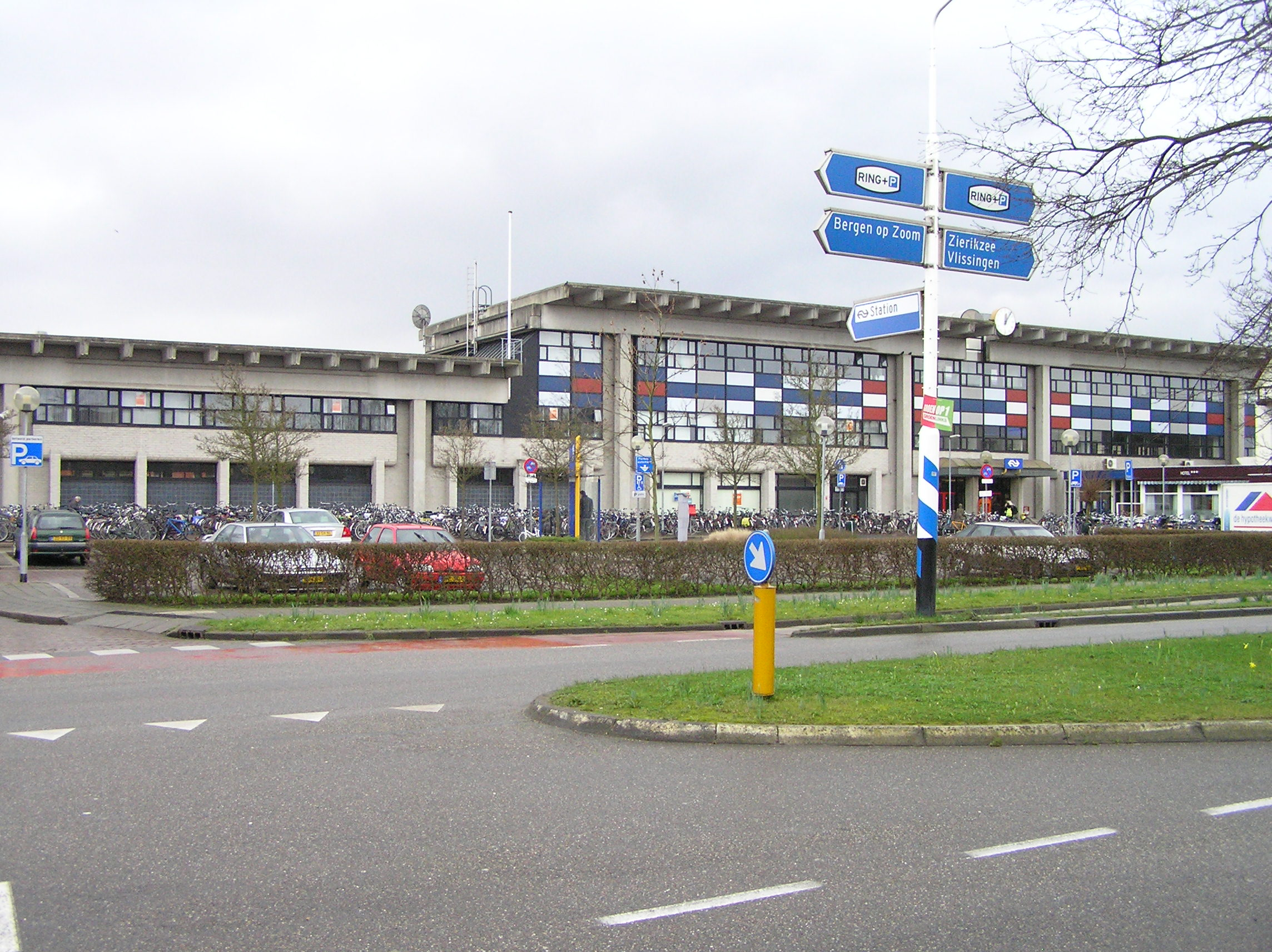

General information
- Location: Netherlands
- Coordinates: 51°29′53″N 3°53′22″E
- Line: Roosendaal–Vlissingen railway
- Connections: Connexxion: 20, 23, 27, 31, 132, 185, 225, 582, 595, 628, 629, 639, 643, 644, 645, 646

Other information
- Station code: Gs

History
- Opened: 1 July 1868

Services
Preceding station	Nederlandse Spoorwegen	Following station
Arnemuiden towards Vlissingen	NS Intercity 2200	Kapelle-Biezelinge towards Amsterdam Centraal
Middelburg towards Vlissingen	NS Intercity 2300 Mon-Fri until 20:00	Bergen op Zoom towards Amsterdam Centraal
Location
- Location within Netherlands

Goes is a railway station located in Goes, the Netherlands. The station was opened on 1 July 1868 and is located on the Roosendaal–Vlissingen railway. The station is operated by Nederlandse Spoorwegen (NS).

== Train service ==
The following services currently call at Goes:

- 2x per hour intercity service Amsterdam - Haarlem - Leiden - The Hague - Rotterdam - Dordrecht - Roosendaal - Vlissingen
- 1x per hour local service Roosendaal - Vlissingen

On weekdays, one of the two the intercity services skips all stations until Bergen op Zoom while the other one runs as a local service, making up a half-hourly service for all stations. On weekdays after 19:30, in weekends, and on holidays, the local service Roosendaal - Vlissingen is dropped from the schedule and both intercity services stop at all stations, with one of them shifted a bit to make up the half-hourly service.

== SGB ==
Close to the station is the depot and station of the museum train line Stoomtrein Goes - Borsele which operates over 11 km (6.8 mi) of a former NS line. The museum tracks are connected to the main rail network at Goes station. There is a train service on Sundays and Holidays between April and October, and Sundays to Fridays in July and August.
