= Krabbendijke railway station =

Railway station in the Netherlands

Krabbendijke
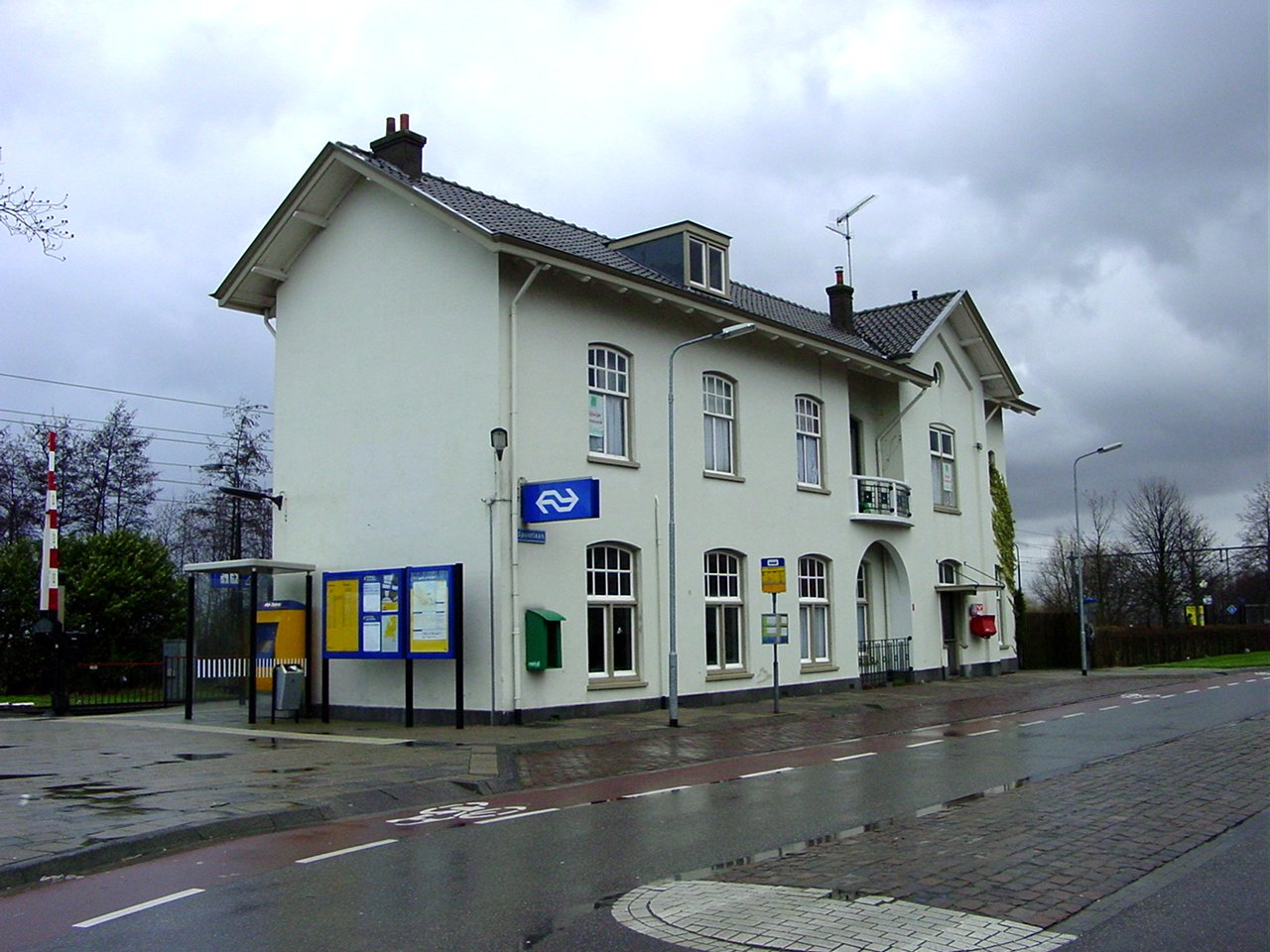

General information
- Location: Netherlands
- Coordinates: 51°26′00″N 4°07′01″E
- Line: Roosendaal–Vlissingen railway
- Connections: Connexxion: 594, 639, 643, 644, 645, 647

Other information
- Station code: Kbd

History
- Opened: 1 July 1868

Services
Preceding station	Nederlandse Spoorwegen	Following station
Kruiningen-Yerseke towards Vlissingen	NS Intercity 2200	Rilland-Bath towards Amsterdam Centraal
Location
- Location within Netherlands

Krabbendijke is a railway station located in Krabbendijke, The Netherlands. The station was opened on 1 July 1868 and is located on the Roosendaal–Vlissingen railway. The train service is operated by Nederlandse Spoorwegen.

== Train service ==
The following services currently call at Krabbendijke:

- 2x per hour intercity service Amsterdam - Haarlem - Leiden - The Hague - Rotterdam - Dordrecht - Roosendaal - Vlissingen

== Bus services ==
Bus Services 39, 43, 44, 45, 46, 47 and 194 stop at the station.
