= Kruiningen-Yerseke railway station =

Railway station in the Netherlands

Kruiningen-Yerseke
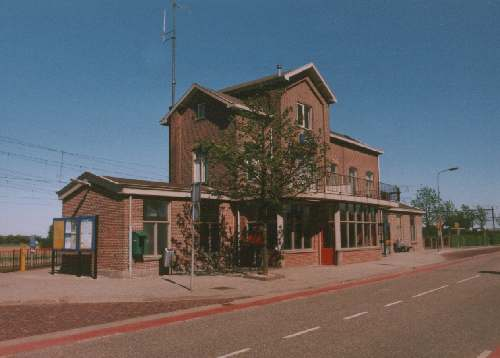

General information
- Location: Netherlands
- Coordinates: 51°27′55″N 4°02′13″E
- Line: Roosendaal–Vlissingen railway
- Connections: 594, 599

Other information
- Station code: Krg

History
- Opened: 1 July 1868

Services
Preceding station	Nederlandse Spoorwegen	Following station
Kapelle-Biezelinge towards Vlissingen	NS Intercity 2200	Krabbendijke towards Amsterdam Centraal
Location
- Location within Netherlands

Kruiningen-Yerseke is a railway station in Zeeland in the south-west Netherlands. Located between Kruiningen and Yerseke on Nederlandse Spoorwegen's Roosendaal to Vlissingen line, the station was opened by the (privately operated but government-built) State Railways on 1 July 1868 and retains its original building from that date (enlarged in 1890 and 1902).

== Train service ==
The station is served by trains running twice an hour in each direction on the Amsterdam – Haarlem – Leiden – The Hague – Rotterdam – Dordrecht – Roosendaal – Vlissingen intercity service.

== Bus services ==
Connexxion bus services 594 (to and from Rilland) and 599 (to and from Wemeldinge) call at the station (daytime Mondays to Fridays only).
