= Rilland-Bath railway station =

Railway station in the Netherlands

Rilland-Bath
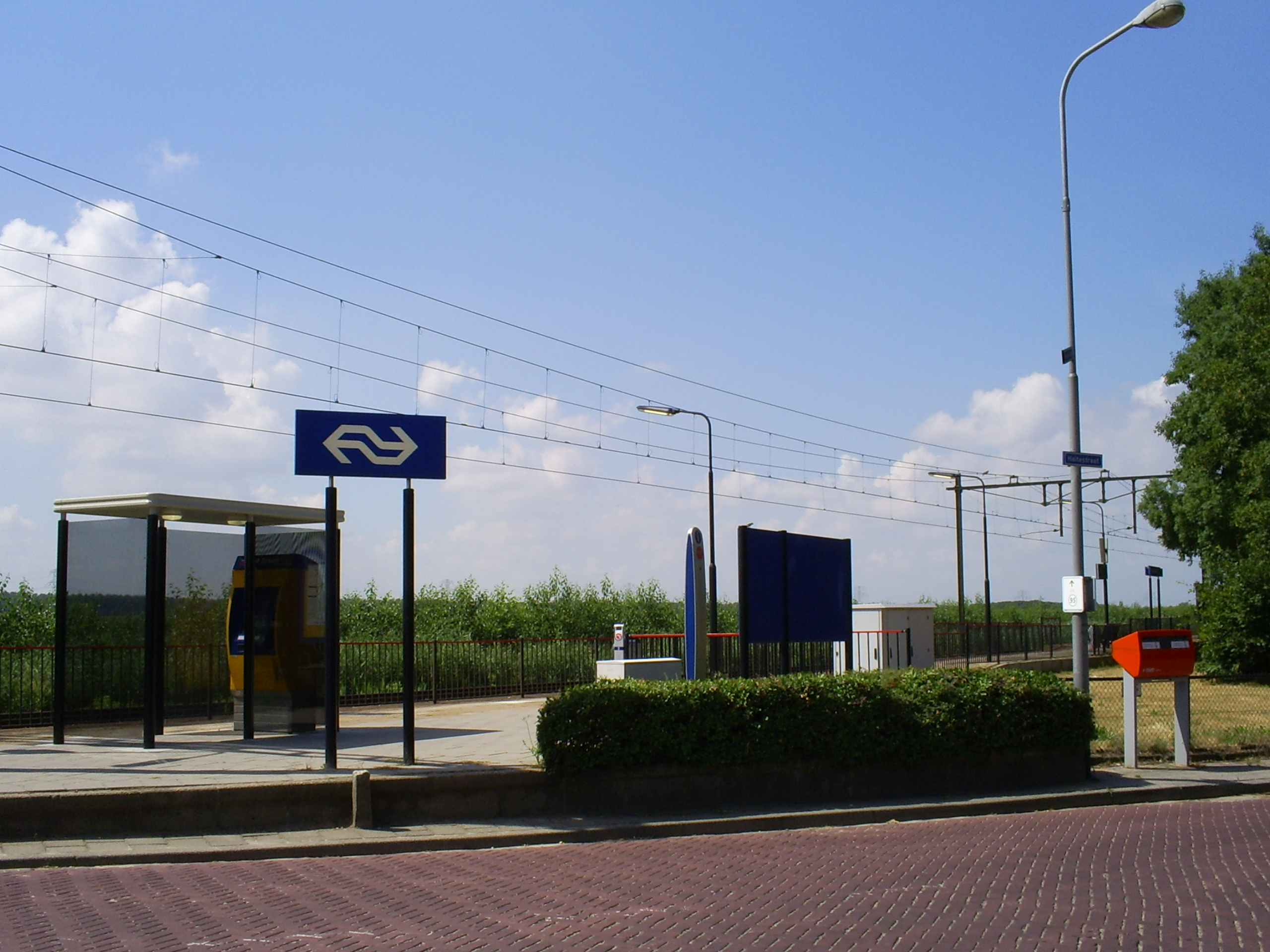

General information
- Location: Netherlands
- Coordinates: 51°25′20″N 4°09′40″E
- Line: Roosendaal–Vlissingen railway
- Connections: Connexxion: 594, 643, 644

Other information
- Station code: Rb

History
- Opened: 1 March 1872

Services
Preceding station	Nederlandse Spoorwegen	Following station
Krabbendijke towards Vlissingen	NS Intercity 2200	Bergen op Zoom towards Amsterdam Centraal
Location
- Location within Netherlands

Rilland-Bath is a railway station located 2 km north west of Rilland, The Netherlands. The station was opened on 1 March 1872 and is located on the Roosendaal–Vlissingen railway. The train services are operated by Nederlandse Spoorwegen

The station is named after the former municipality of Rilland-Bath.

== Train service ==
The following services currently call at Rilland-Bath:

- 2x per hour intercity service Amsterdam - Haarlem - Leiden - The Hague - Rotterdam - Dordrecht - Roosendaal - Vlissingen
