= Middelburg railway station =

Railway station in the Netherlands

Middelburg
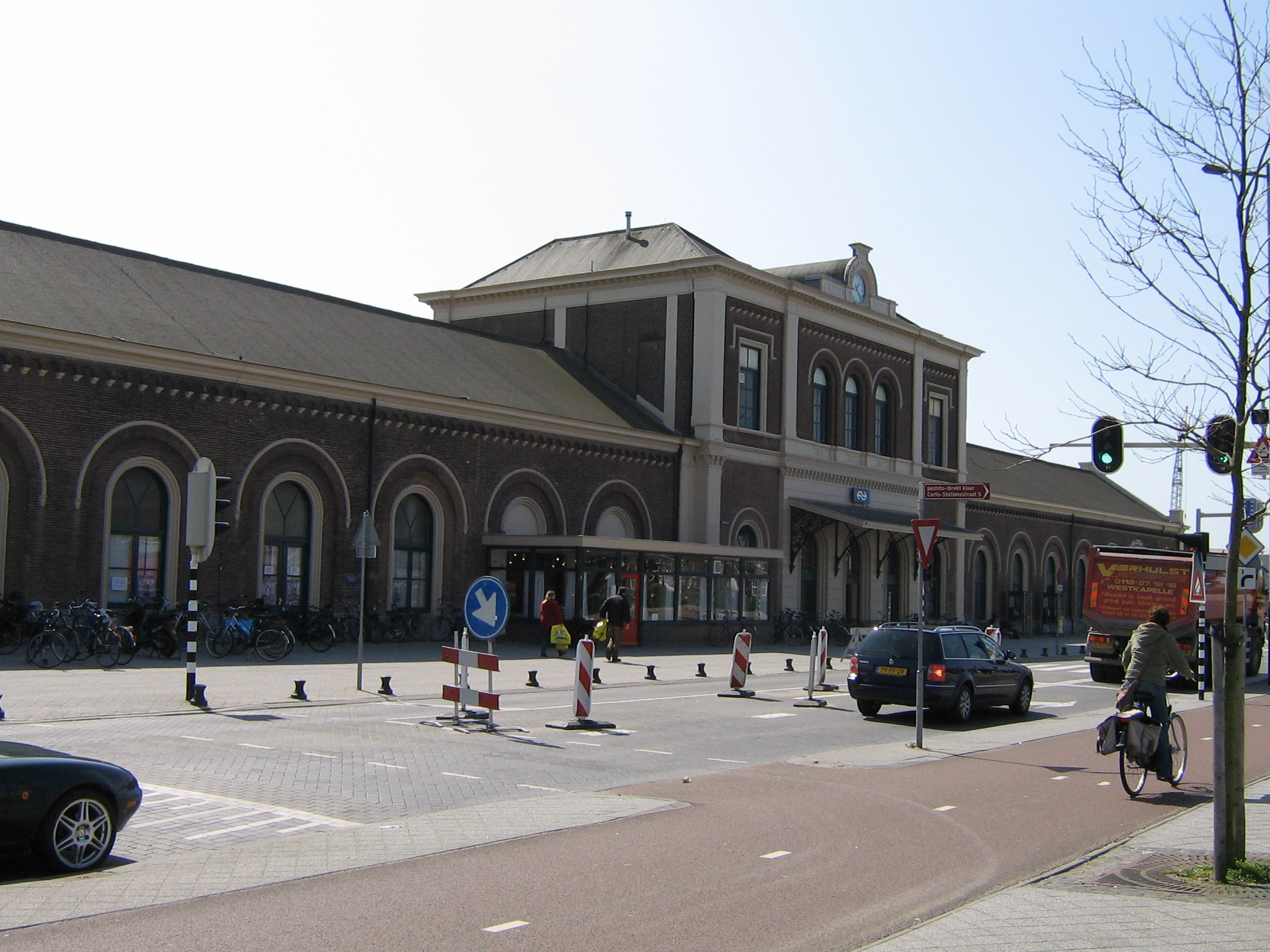

General information
- Location: Netherlands
- Coordinates: 51°29′42″N 3°37′05″E
- Line: Roosendaal–Vlissingen railway
- Connections: Connexxion: 50, 52, 53, 56, 57, 58, 65, 133, 569, 581, 584, 633, 646, 647, 864

Other information
- Station code: Mdb

History
- Opened: 1 March 1872

Services
Preceding station	Nederlandse Spoorwegen	Following station
Vlissingen Souburg towards Vlissingen	NS Intercity 2200	Arnemuiden towards Amsterdam Centraal
Vlissingen Terminus	NS Intercity 2300 Mon-Fri until 20:00	Goes towards Amsterdam Centraal
Location
- Location within Netherlands

Middelburg is a railway station in southern Middelburg, Netherlands. The station opened on 1 March 1872 and is located on the Roosendaal–Vlissingen railway. The services are operated by Nederlandse Spoorwegen. The station lies on the south side of Middelburg across the canal from the centre.

The station area has undergone a metamorphosis since 2000. A new, modern bus station was built (previously the stops were located on the other side of the canal).

== Train services ==
The station is served by the following service(s):

- 2x per hour intercity service Amsterdam – Haarlem – Leiden – The Hague – Rotterdam – Dordrecht – Roosendaal – Vlissingen (local service between Roosendaal and Vlissingen)
- 2x per weekday intercity service Roosendaal – Vlissingen (express service between Roosendaal and Vlissingen in the peak direction, only stopping at Middelburg, Goes and Bergen op Zoom. Splits from/Combines with the regular Amsterdam – Vlissingen intercity service at Roosendaal)

== Bus services ==
The following bus services depart from the bus station outside the station:

- 50 – Station Middelburg – 's-Heerenhoek – Terneuzen (2x per hour, 1x per hour on Saturdays and every 2 hours on Sundays)
- 52 – Station Middelburg – Middelburg – Grijpskerke – Aagtekerke – Domburg (1x per hour, every 2 hours on Sundays)
- 53 – Station Middelburg – Middelburg – Koudekerke – Biggekerke – Meliskerke – Zoutelande – Westkapelle – Domburg (1x per hour, every 2 hours on Sundays)
- 54 – Station Middelburg – Middelburg – Veere (1x per hour, every 2 hours on Sundays)
- 55 – Station Middelburg – Middelburg – West-Souburg – Vlissingen Centre (1x per hour, every 2 hours on Sundays)
- 56 – Station Middelburg – Middelburg – Koudekerke – Vlissingen Centre – Vlissingen NS (Interchange with Veolia Fast Ferries (2x per hour, 1x per hour on Sundays)
- 57 – Station Middelburg – Middelburg South – Oost-Souburg – Vlissingen Centre (2x per hour, 1x per hour on Sundays)
- 58 – Station Middelburg – Middelburg – West-Souburg – Vlissingen Centre (1x per hour, every 2 hours on Sundays)

All bus services are operated by Connexxion.

== Gallery ==
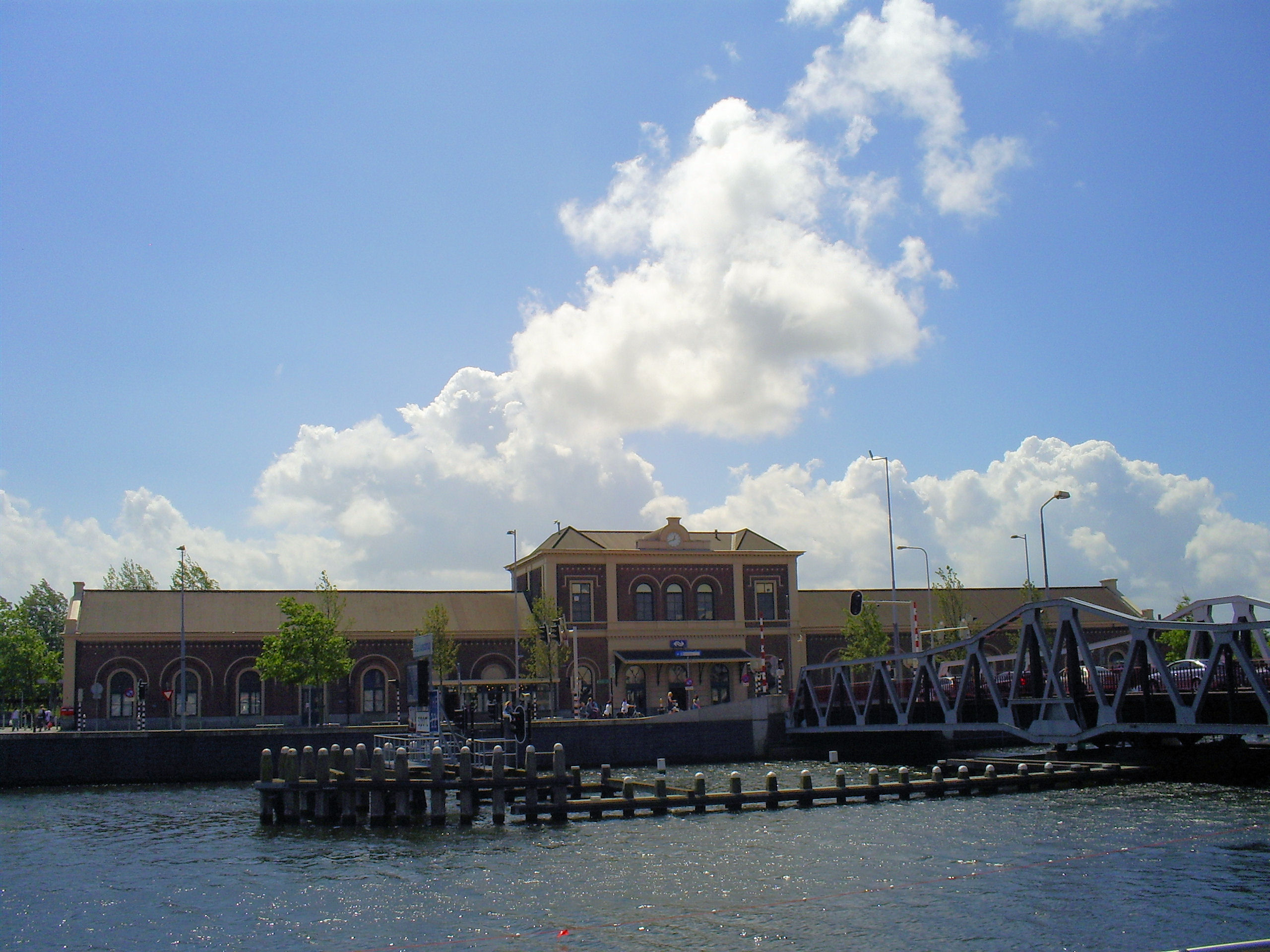

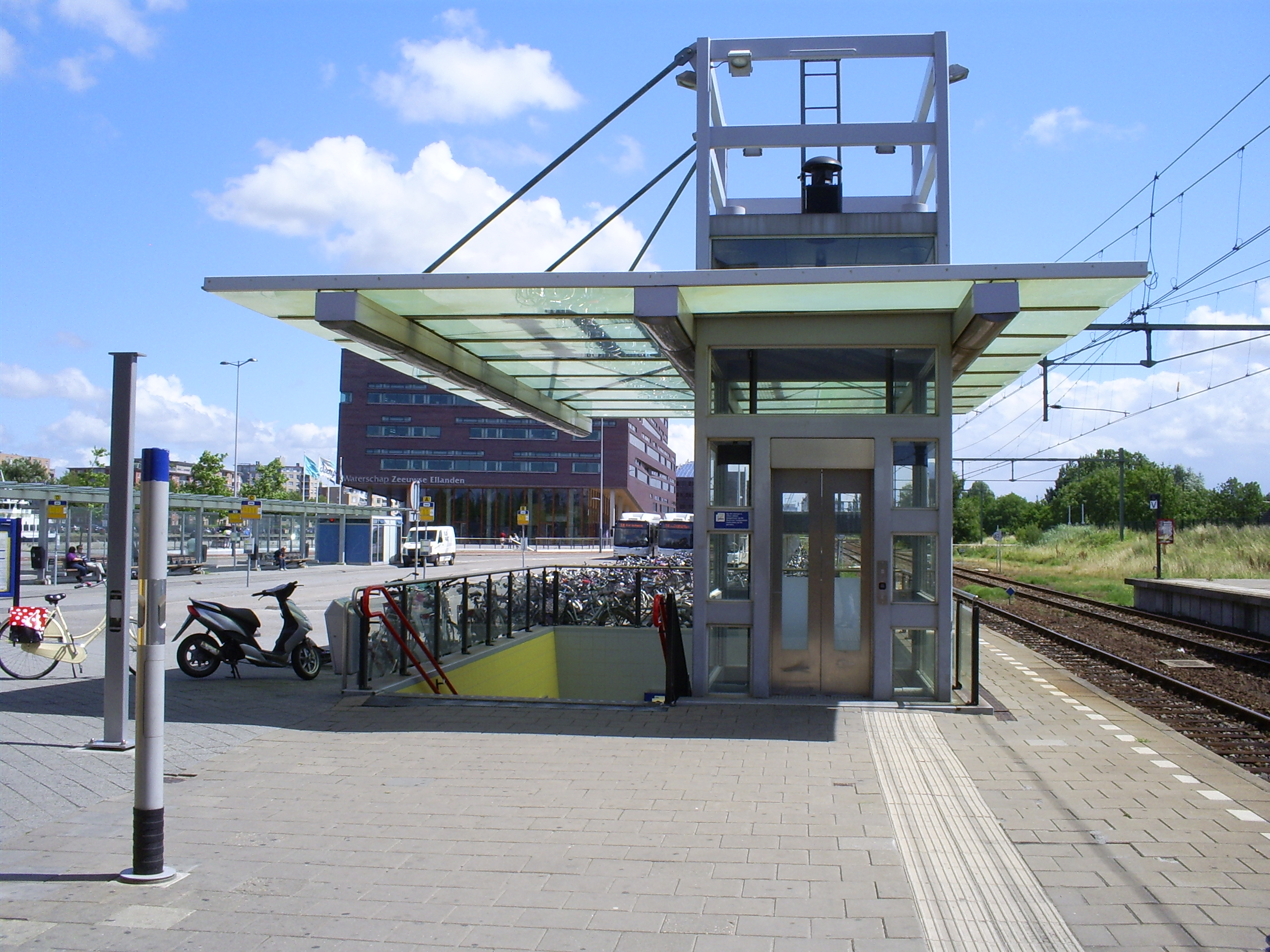

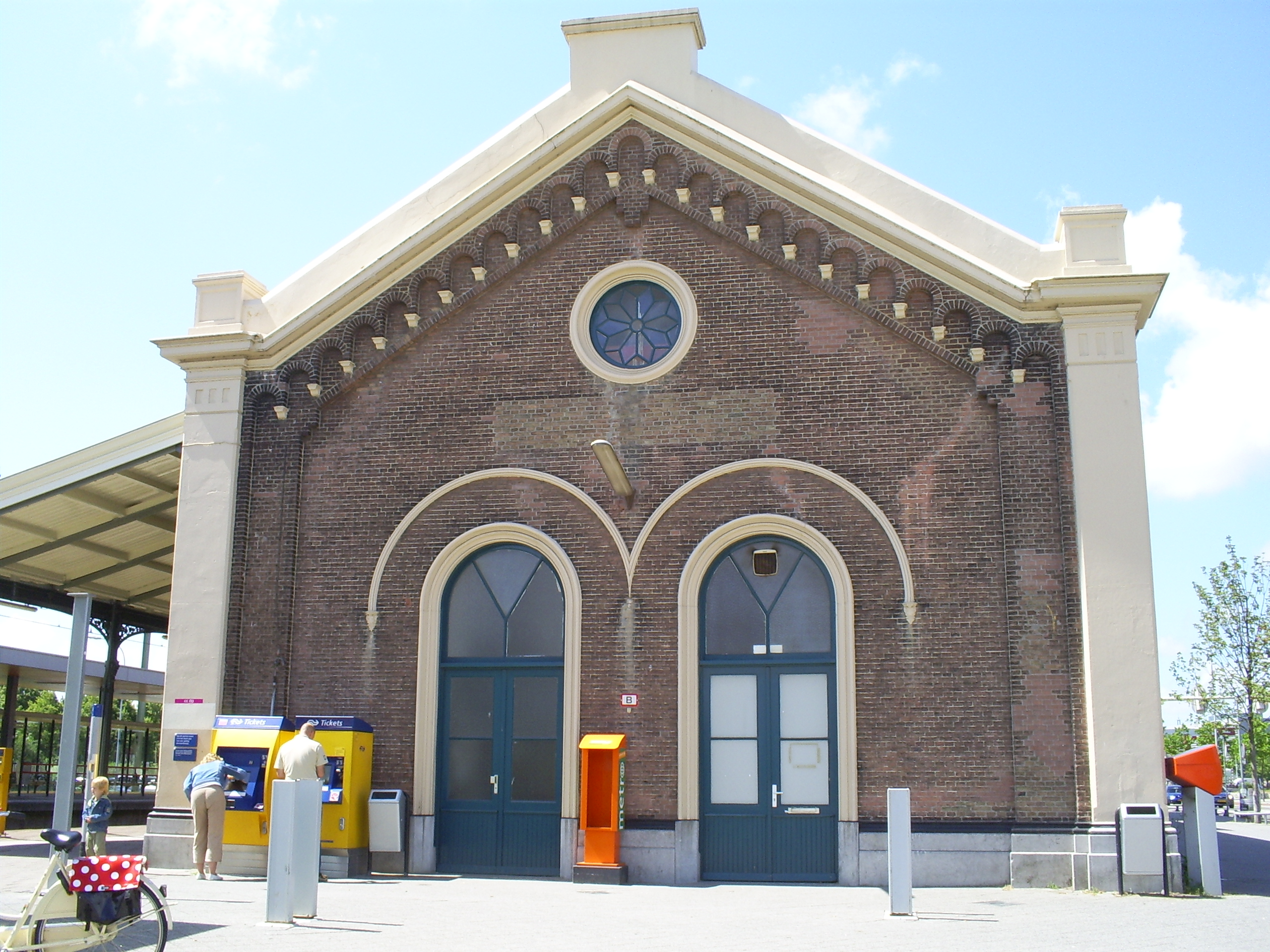

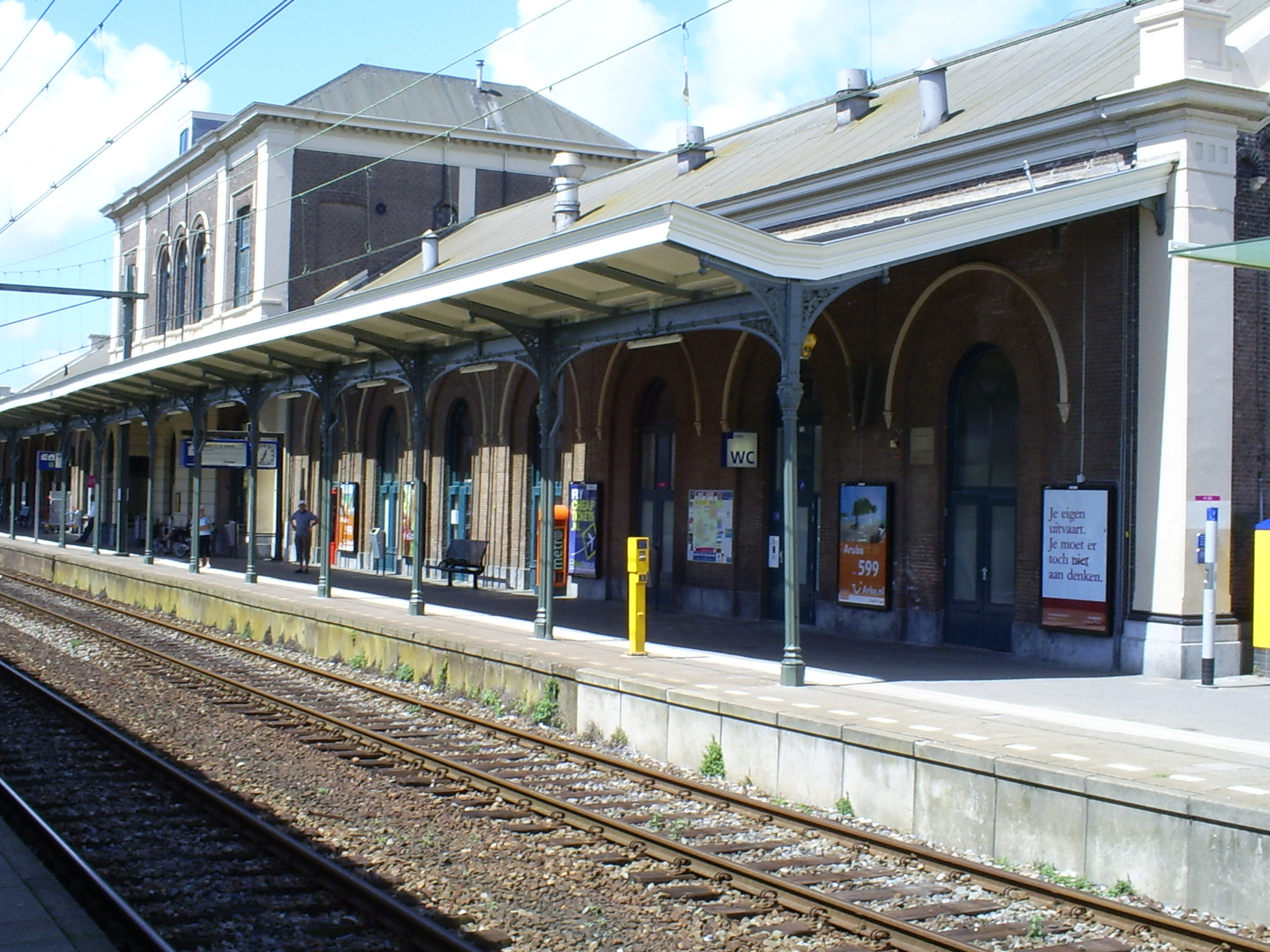

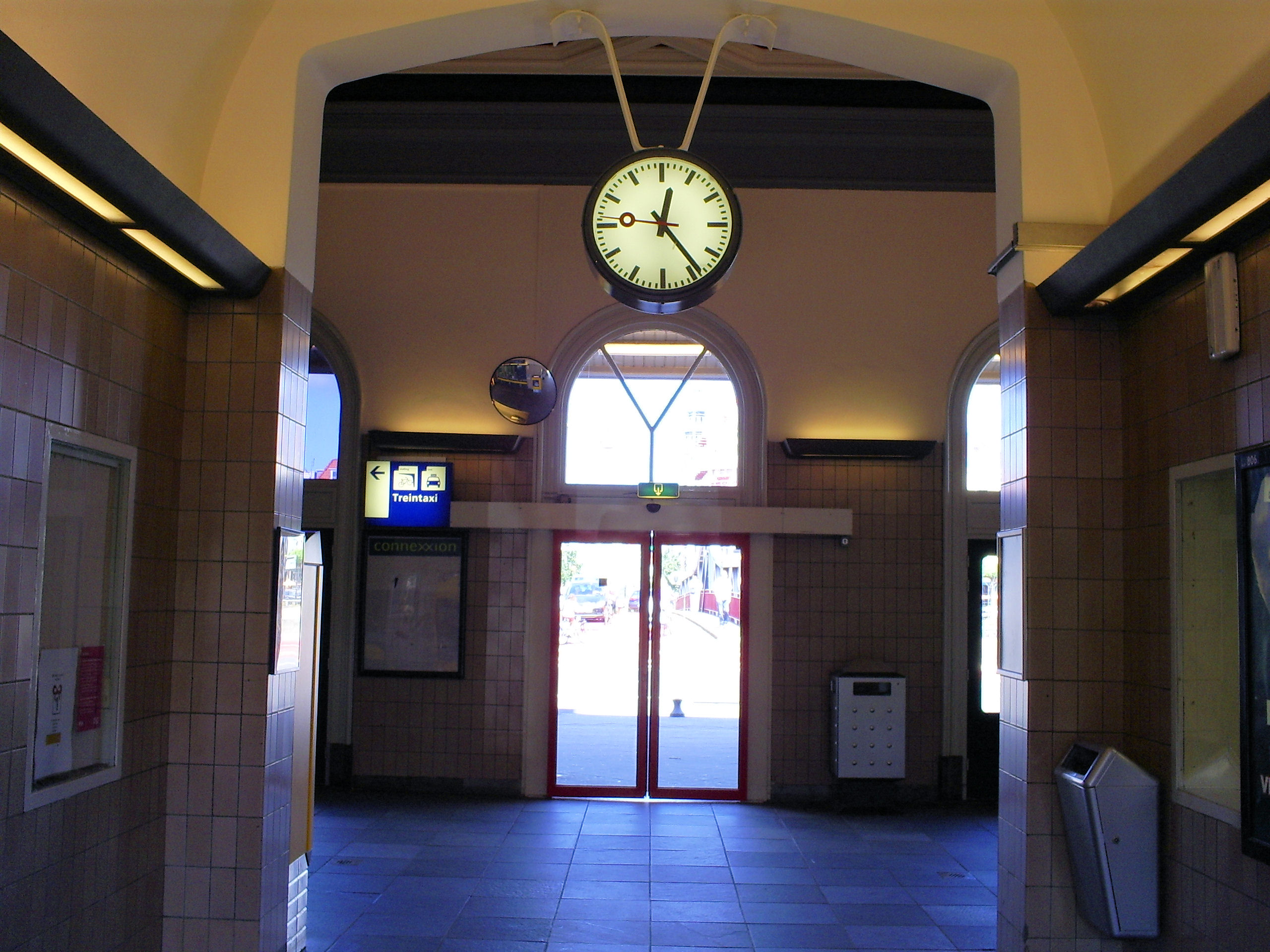

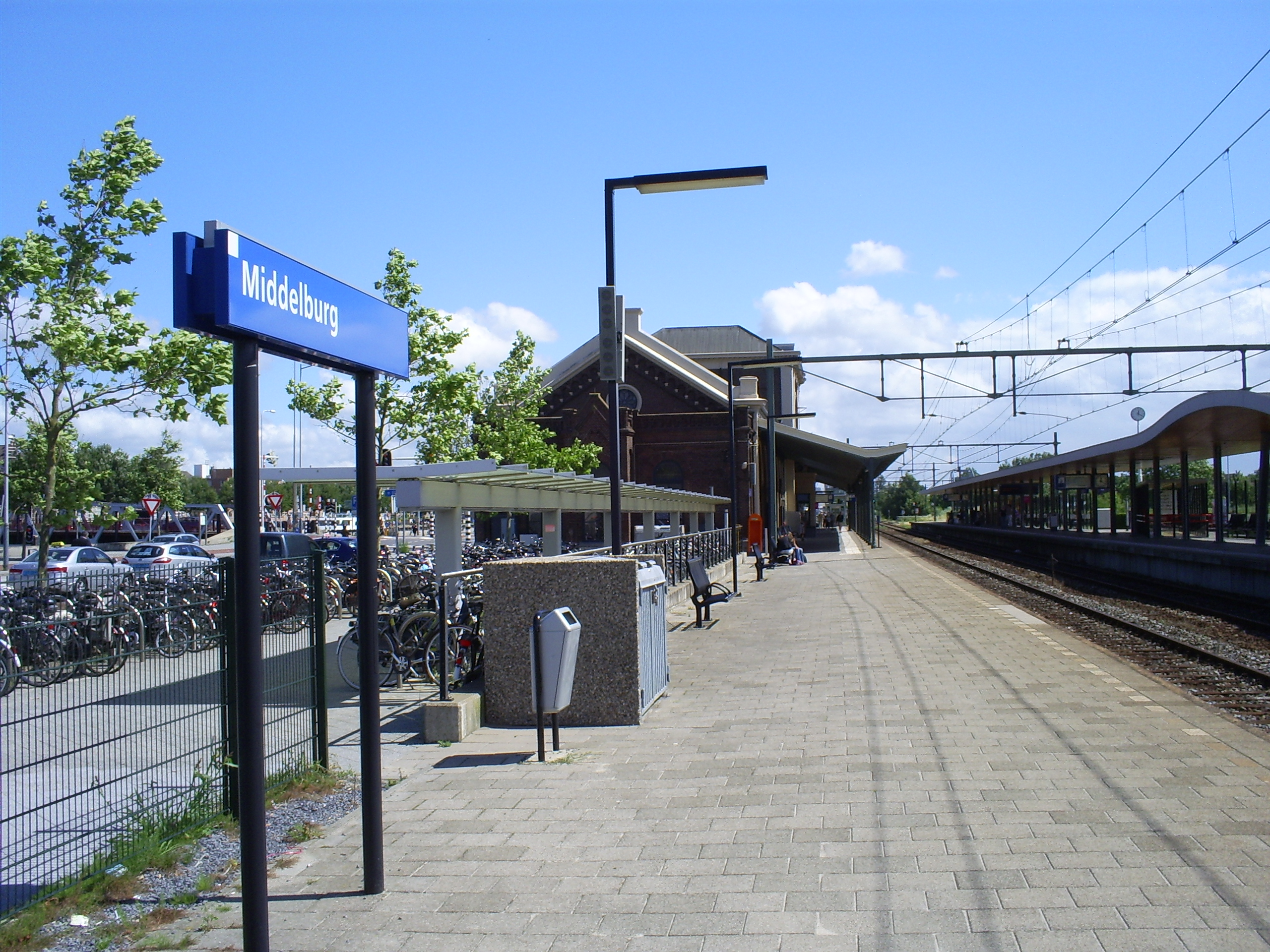

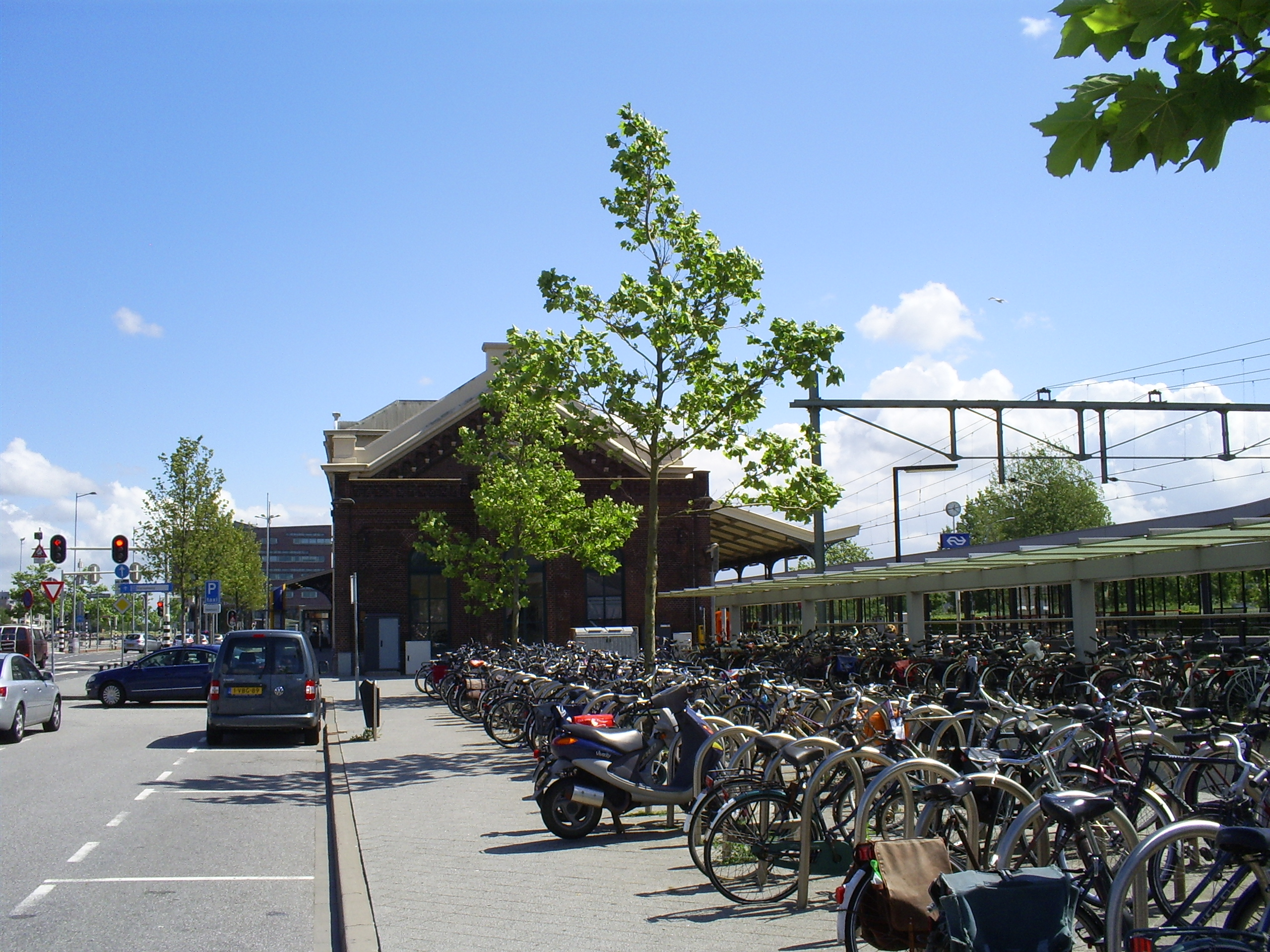

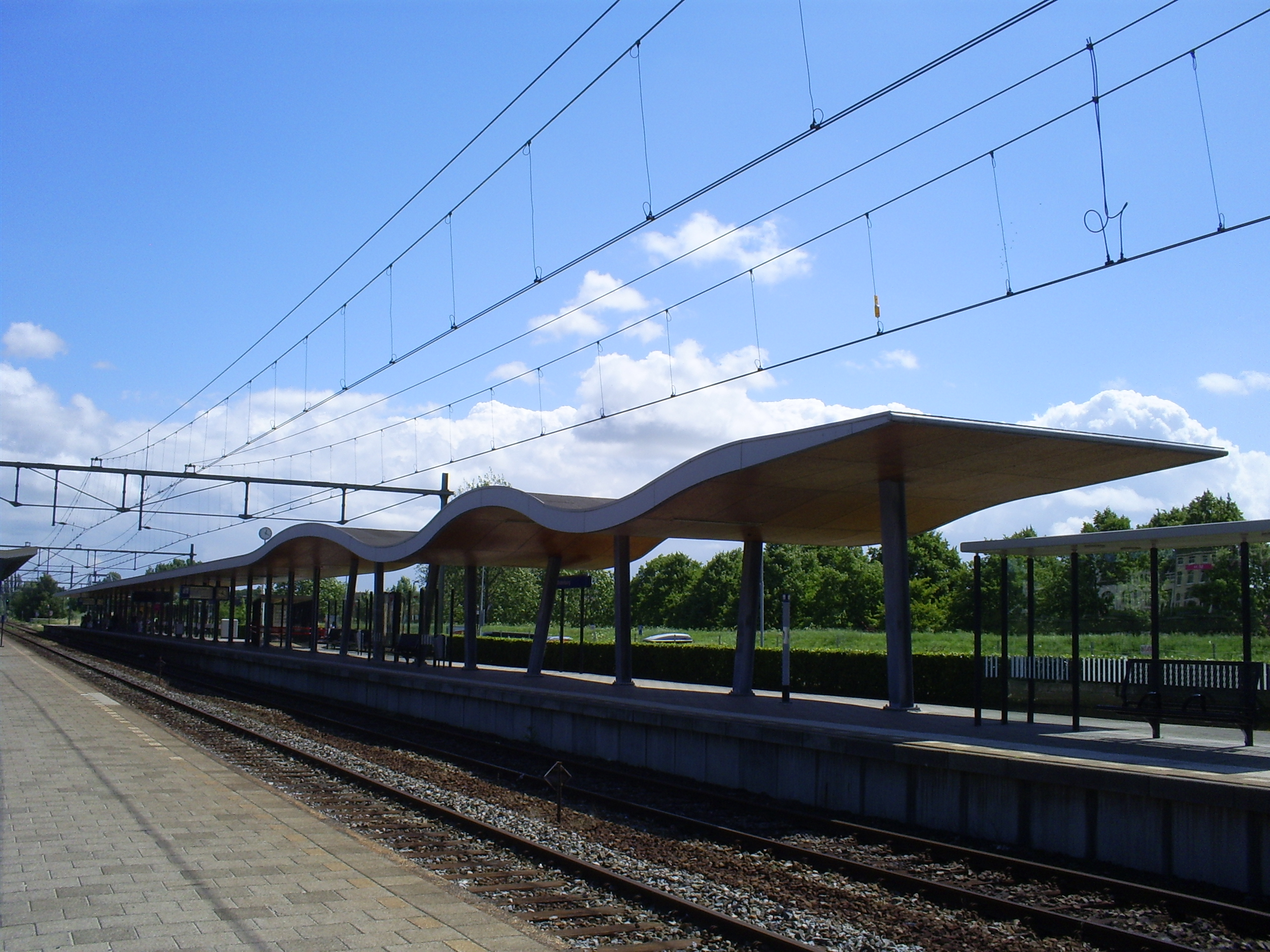
