= Vlissingen Souburg railway station =

Railway station in the Netherlands

Vlissingen Souburg
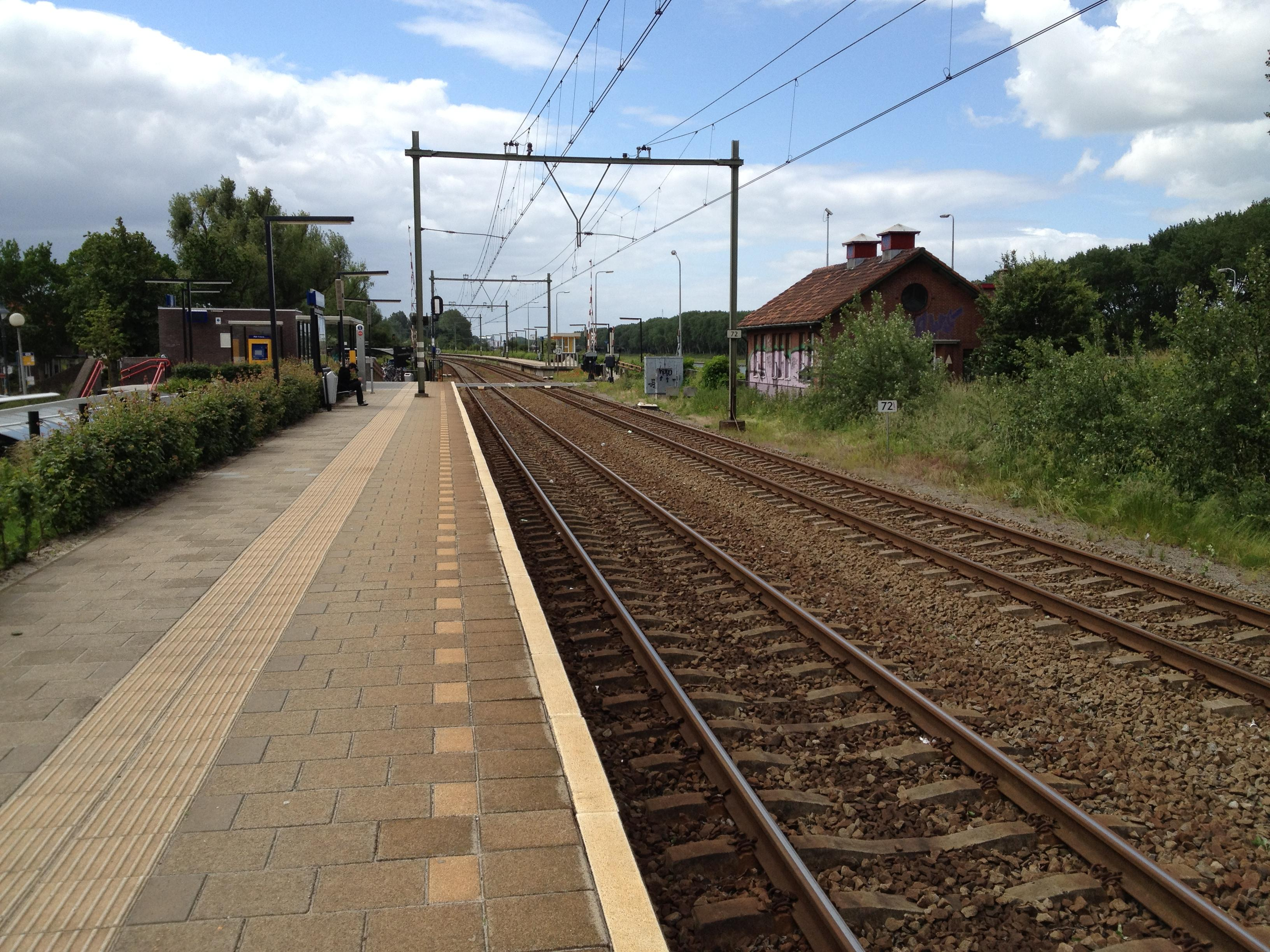

General information
- Location: Netherlands
- Coordinates: 51°27′53″N 3°35′43″E
- Line: Roosendaal–Vlissingen railway
- Connections: Connexxion: 58, 633

Other information
- Station code: Vss

History
- Opened: 31 May 1986

Services
Preceding station	Nederlandse Spoorwegen	Following station
Vlissingen Terminus	NS Intercity 2200	Middelburg towards Amsterdam Centraal
Location
- Location within Netherlands

Vlissingen Souburg (English: Flushing Souburg) is a railway station located in Oost-Souburg, Netherlands. The station was opened on 31 May 1986 and is located on the Roosendaal–Vlissingen railway. It is the westernmost station in the Netherlands. The train services are operated by Nederlandse Spoorwegen.

== History ==
Vlissingen Souburg plays an important complementary role in relation to the station at Vlissingen and serves Oost-Souburg also the northern outskirts of Vlissingen. The station is located along the Canal through Walcheren, near the swing bridge which connects Oost-Souburg, West-Souburg and the Vlissingen neighbourhood of Westerzicht .

The station was opened in 1986 and is a typical suburban station. There are two platforms, which do not lie opposite each other, but located on either side of the level crossing. On the eastern platform there was originally a station building with waiting area and ticket office; a standard design of architect Hans Bak. In 2007 the building was demolished; the staffed ticket office had closed four years earlier. It has broadened the platform on the site of the former building.

There are several unguarded bike racks and bike lockers available. There is parking for cars.

== Train service ==
The station is served by the following service(s):

- 2x per hour intercity service Amsterdam - Haarlem - Leiden - The Hague - Rotterdam - Dordrecht - Roosendaal - Vlissingen

== Gallery ==
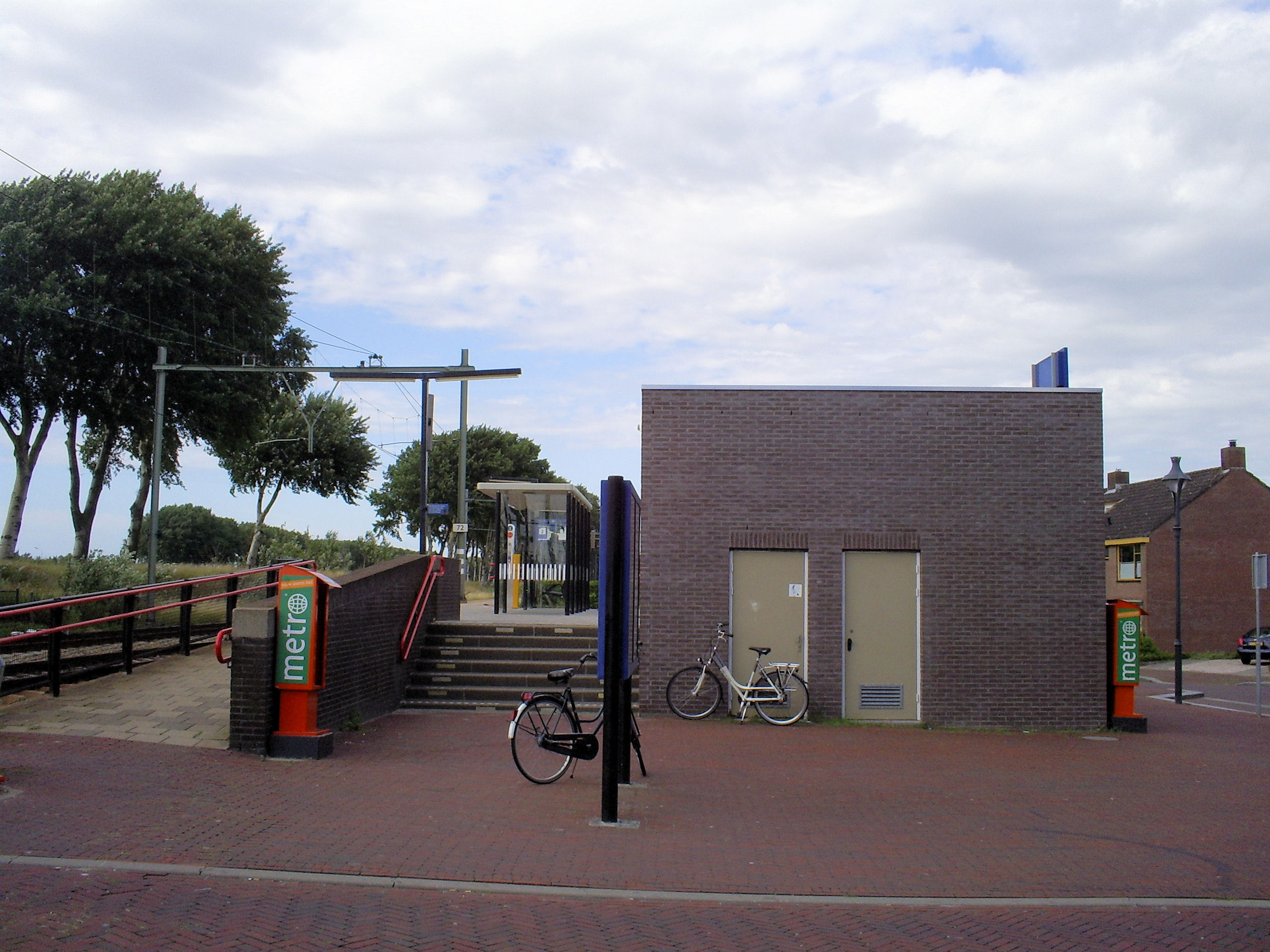

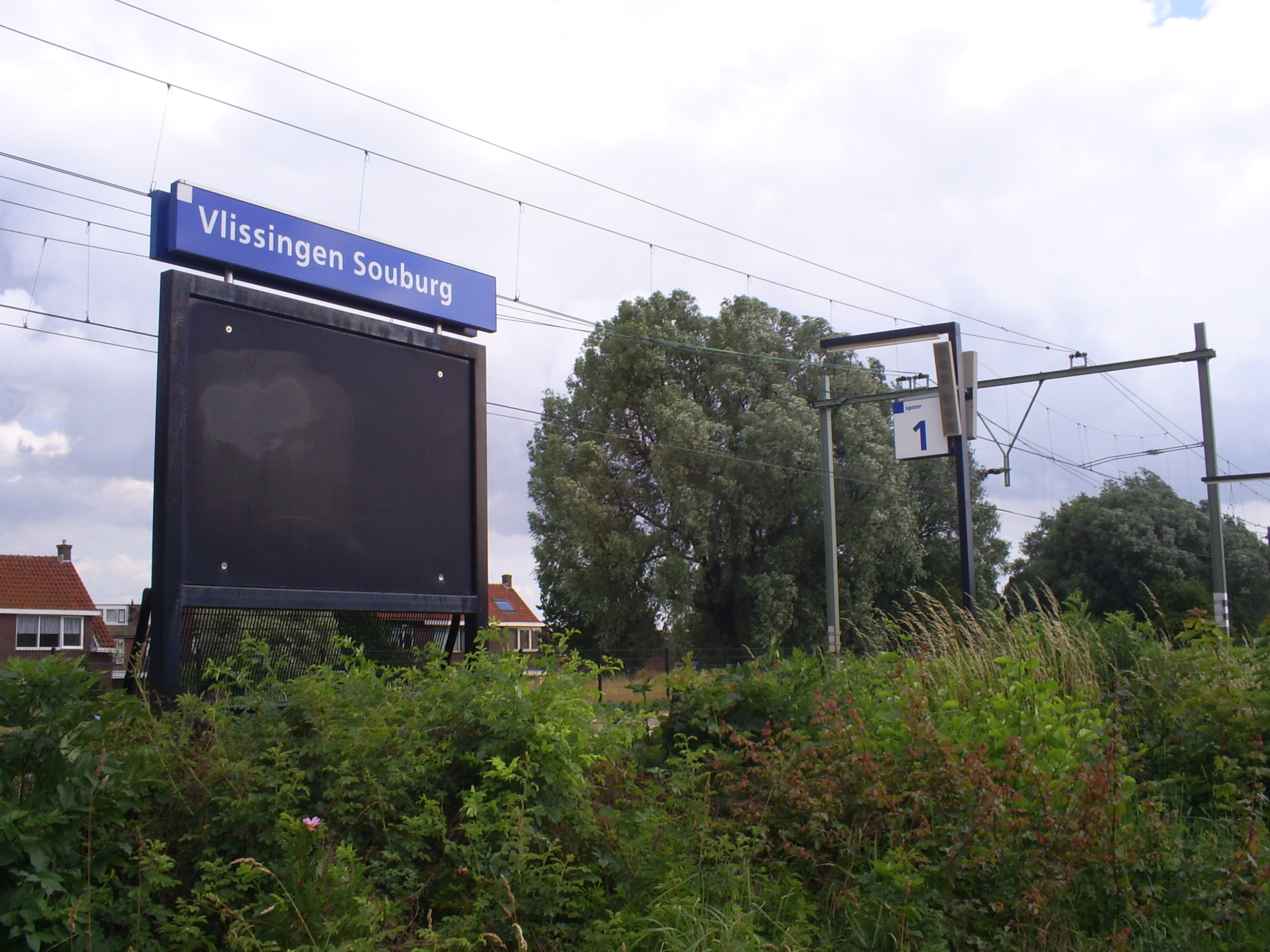

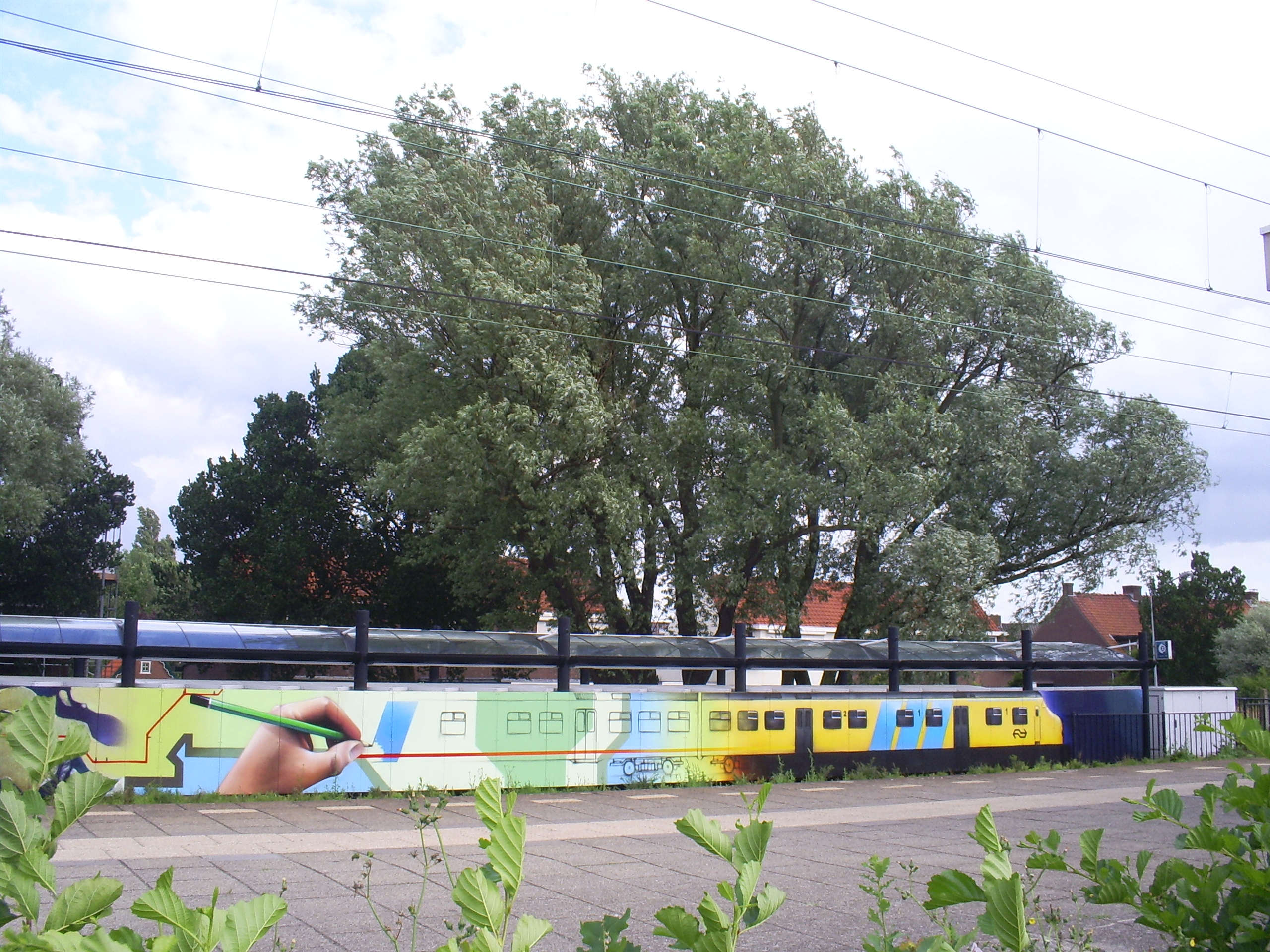

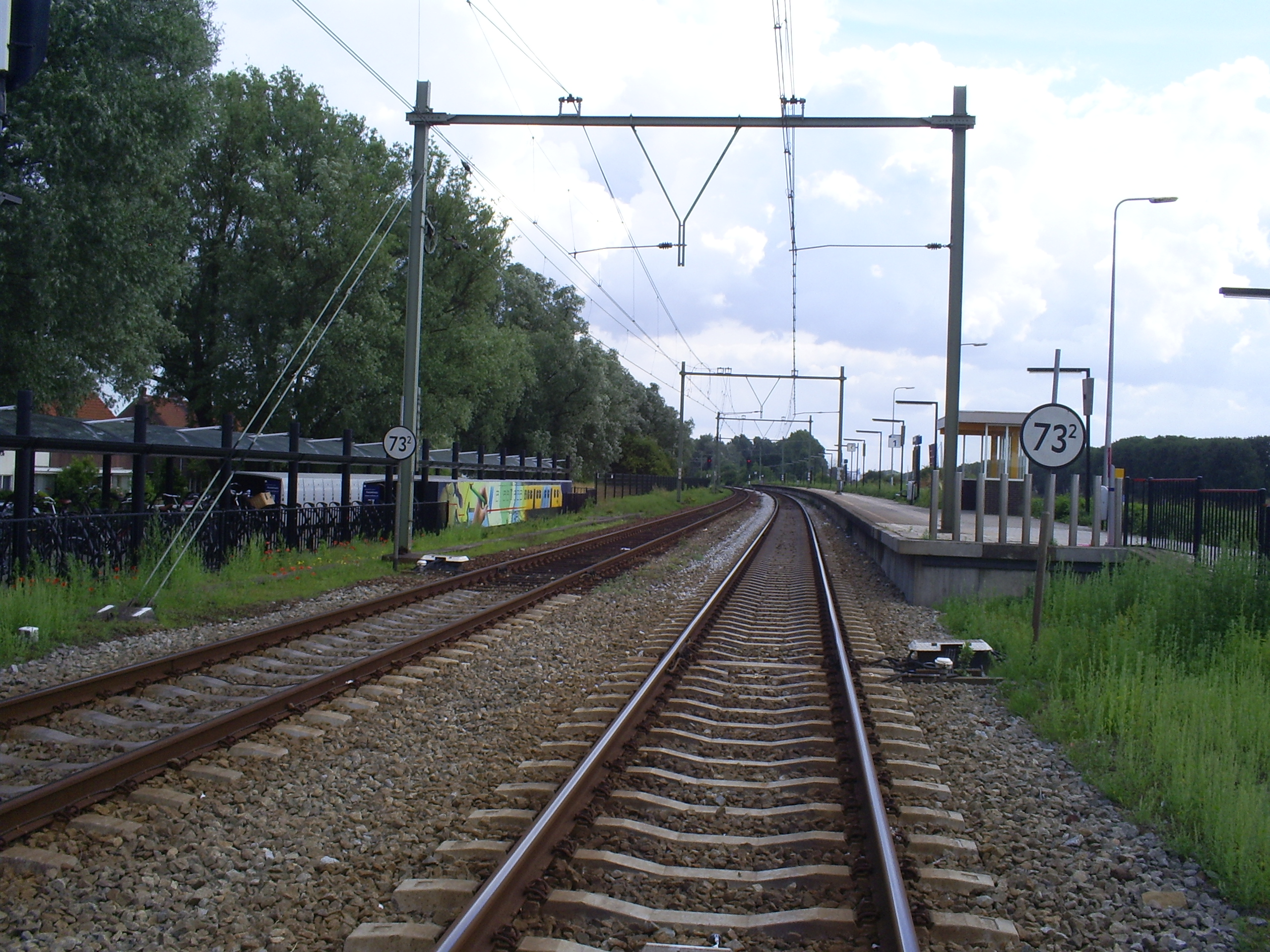

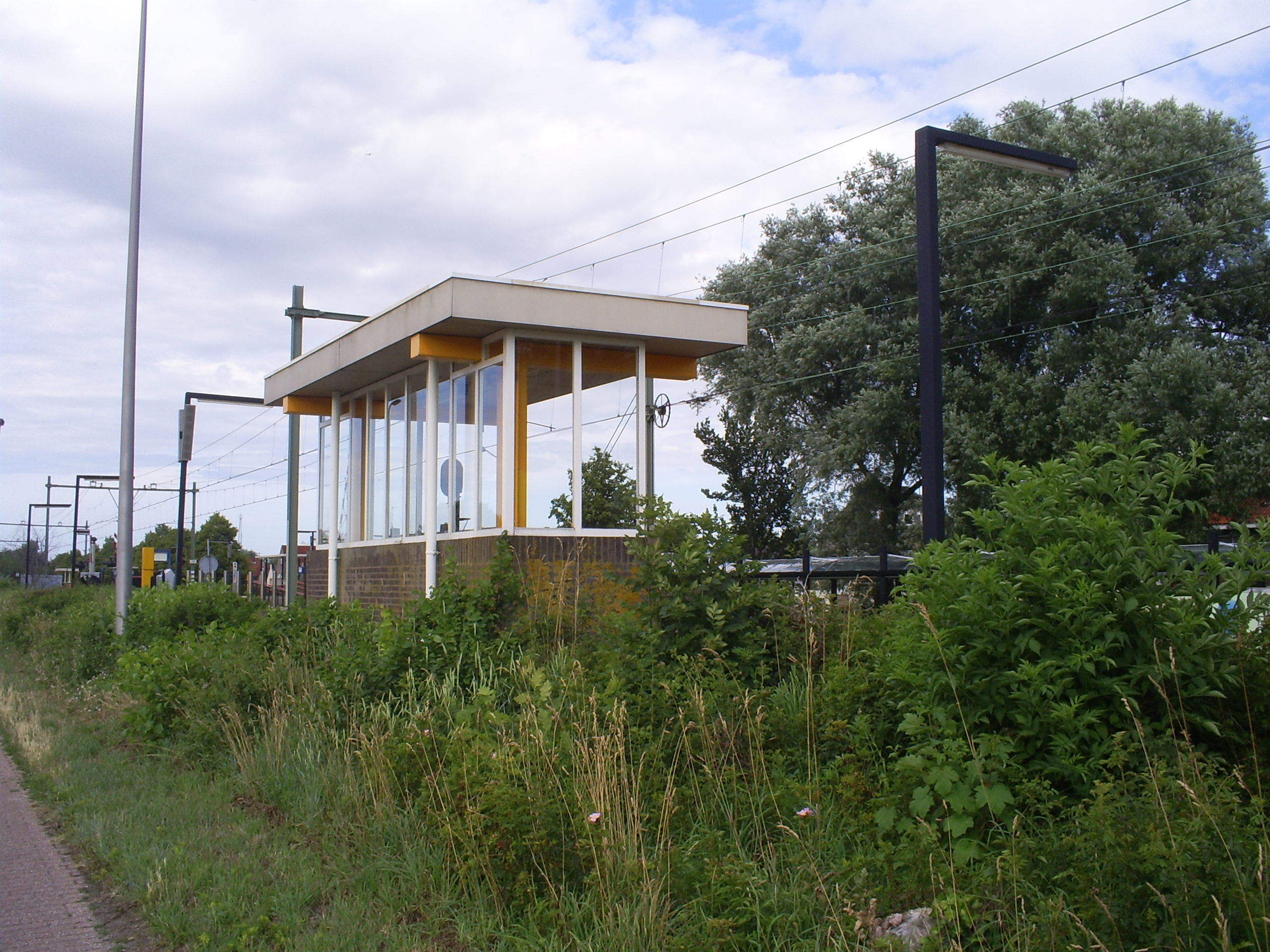
