= Kapelle-Biezelinge railway station =

Railway station in the Netherlands

Kapelle-Biezelinge
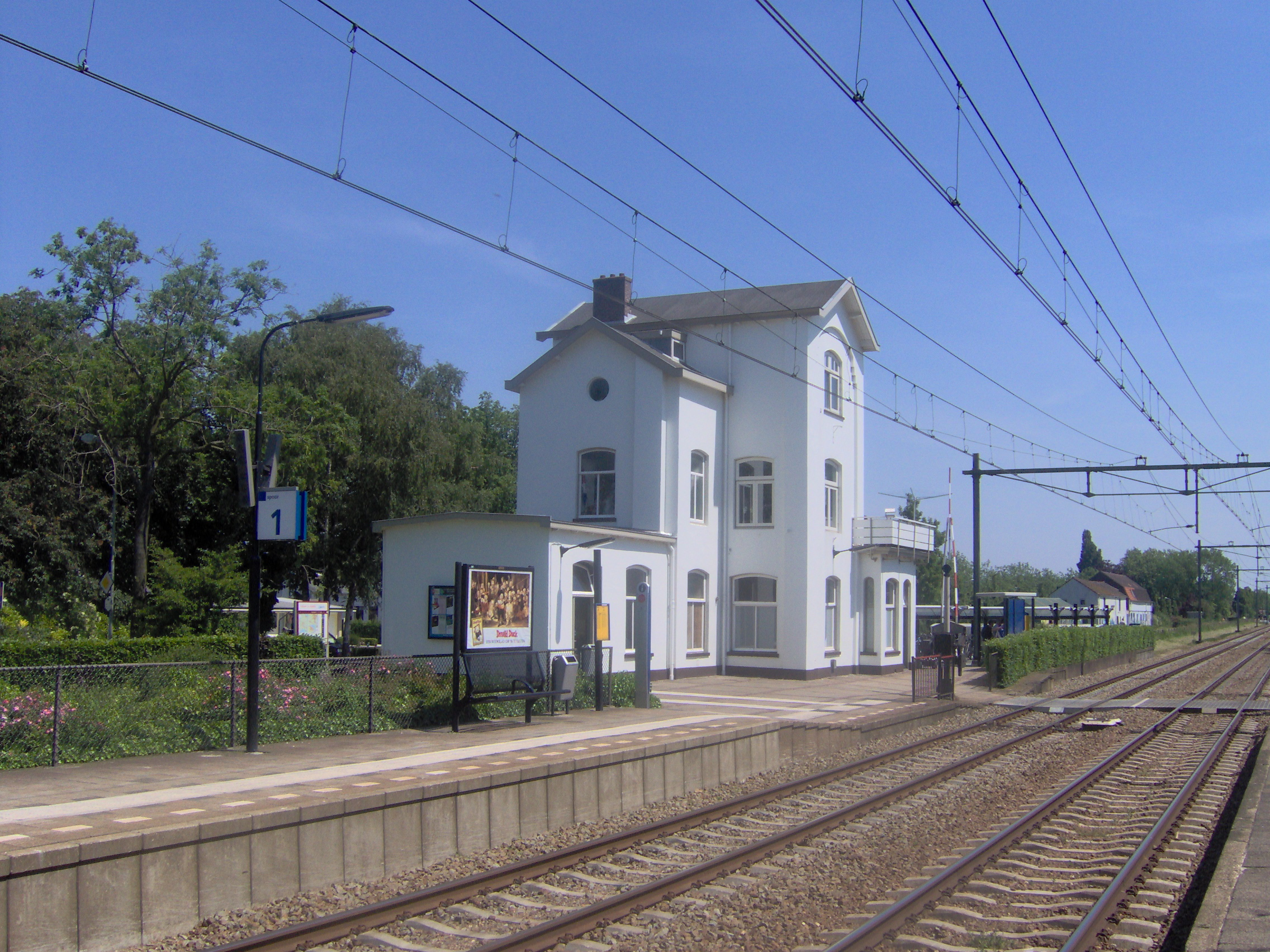

General information
- Location: Netherlands
- Coordinates: 51°28′49″N 3°57′26″E
- Line: Roosendaal–Vlissingen railway
- Connections: Connexxion: 599

Other information
- Station code: Bzl

History
- Opened: 1 July 1868

Services
Preceding station	Nederlandse Spoorwegen	Following station
Goes towards Vlissingen	NS Intercity 2200	Kruiningen-Yerseke towards Amsterdam Centraal
Location
- Location within Netherlands

Kapelle-Biezelinge is a railway station located in Kapelle and near the housing area of Biezelinge, The Netherlands. The station was opened on 1 July 1868 and is located on the Roosendaal–Vlissingen railway. The train service is operated by Nederlandse Spoorwegen.

== Destinations ==
The following major destination is possible from Kapelle-Biezelinge:

Vlissingen, Middelburg, Goes, Bergen op Zoom and Roosendaal.

== Train service ==
The following services currently call at Kapelle-Biezelinge:

- 2x per hour intercity service Amsterdam - Haarlem - Leiden - The Hague - Rotterdam - Dordrecht - Roosendaal - Vlissingen

== Bus service ==
Bus Service 28 stops 100 metres (330 ft) east of the station at bus stop van Wingen.
