= Roosendaal–Vlissingen railway =

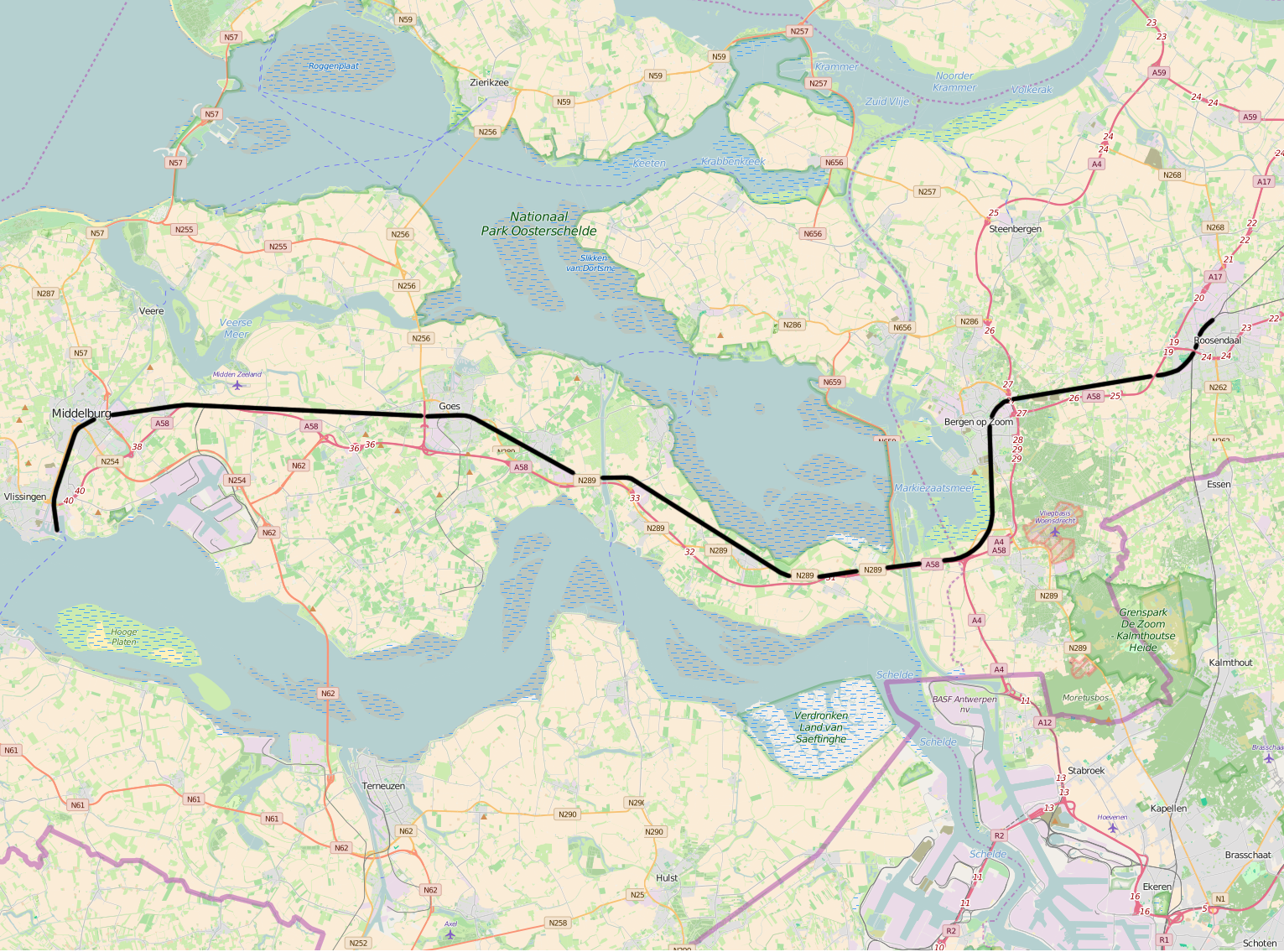

Overview
- Other name: Staatslijn F
- Owner: ProRail
- Locale: Netherlands
- Termini: Roosendaal; Vlissingen

Service
- Operator(s): Nederlandse Spoorwegen

History
- Opened: 1863 (Roosendaal - Bergen op Zoom)
- Completed: 1873

Technical
- Line length: 74.4 km (46.2 mi)
- Track gauge: 1,435 mm (4 ft 8 1/2 in) standard gauge
- Electrification: 1.5kV DC
- Operating speed: 140 km/h (87 mph)
- Signalling: ATB-EG

The Roosendaal–Vlissingen railway is a railway line in the Netherlands running from Roosendaal to Vlissingen passing through the provinces of North Brabant and Zeeland. It is also known as Staatslijn F.

== Train services ==
The following services are operating as of 2023:

Train	From	Via	To	Freq.	Remarks
Intercity 2200	Amsterdam Centraal	Amsterdam Sloterdijk - Haarlem - Heemstede-Aerdenhout - Leiden Centraal - Den Haag Laan van NOI - Den Haag HS - Delft - Schiedam Centrum - Rotterdam Centraal - Dordrecht - Roosendaal - Bergen op Zoom ( - Rilland-Bath - Krabbendijke - Kruiningen-Yerseke - Kapelle-Biezelinge) - Goes ( - Arnemuiden) - Middelburg ( - Vlissingen Souburg)	Vlissingen	2/hour	1 train per hour stops at all stations between Roosendaal and Vlissingen. This trains forms a half-hourly service with the Sprinter 6100.
Sprinter 6100	Roosendaal	Bergen op Zoom - Rilland-Bath - Krabbendijke - Kruiningen-Yerseke - Kapelle-Biezelinge - Goes - Arnemuiden - Middelburg - Vlissingen Souburg	Vlissingen	1/hour	Forms a half-hourly service with the Intercity 2200 stopping at all stations between Roosendaal and Vlissingen.

Freight transport occurs between Roosendaal and the Sloe industrial area in Vlissingen.
