= Vlissingen railway station =

Terminus railway station in Vlissingen, Netherlands

Vlissingen
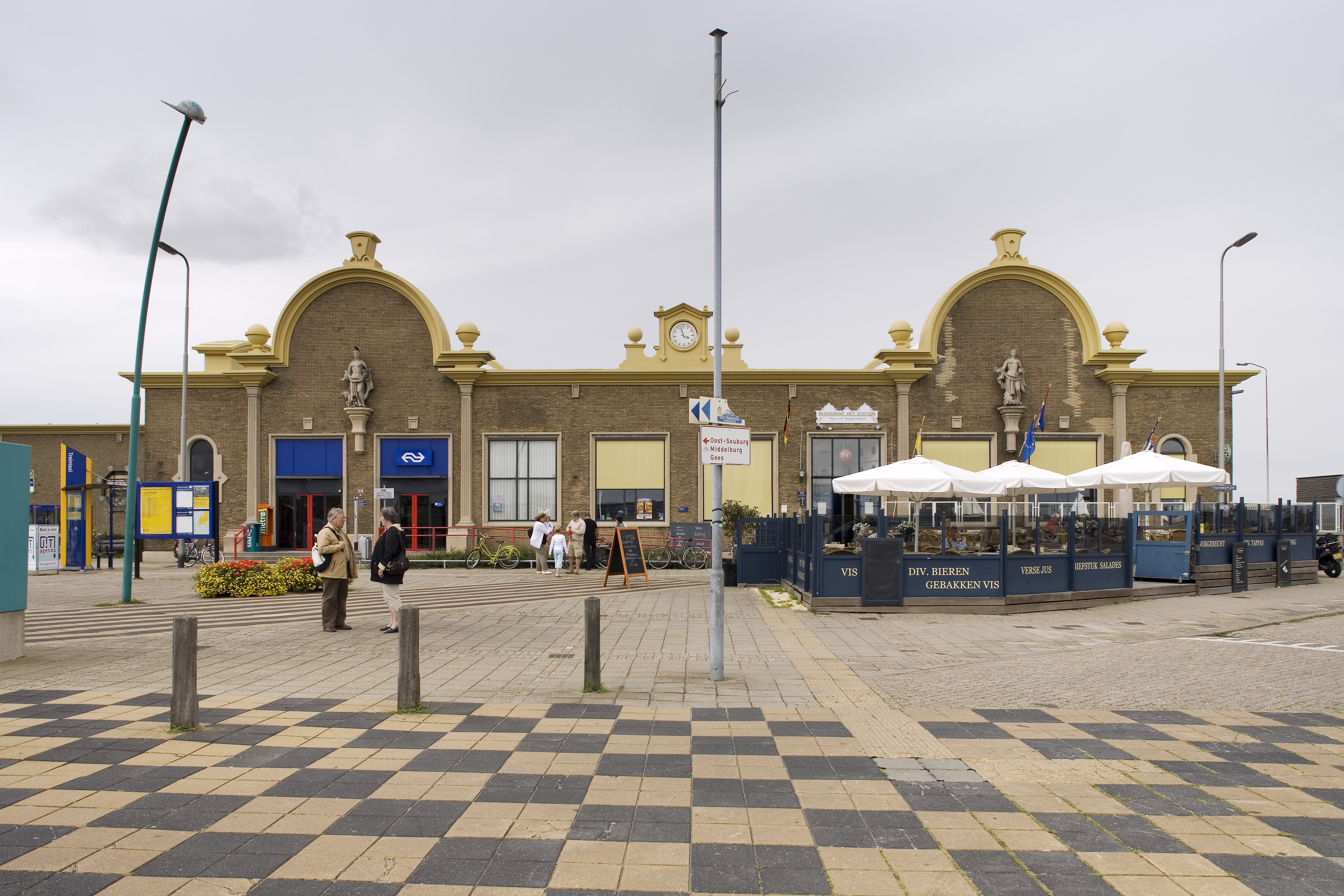

General information
- Location: Netherlands
- Coordinates: 51°26′39″N 3°35′45″E
- Line: Roosendaal–Vlissingen railway
- Platforms: 3
- Connections: Westerschelde Ferry Vlissingen-Breskens; Connexxion: 56, 57, 58, 864

Other information
- Station code: Vs

History
- Opened: 1 September 1873

Services
| Preceding station | Nederlandse Spoorwegen | Following station |
|---|---|---|
| Terminus | NS Intercity 2200 | Vlissingen Souburg towards Amsterdam Centraal |
| Terminus | NS Intercity 2300 Mon-Fri until 20:00 | Middelburg towards Amsterdam Centraal |
Location
- Location within Netherlands

Vlissingen (English name: Flushing) is a terminus railway station in Vlissingen, Netherlands. The station opened on 1 September 1873. The station is at the western end of the Roosendaal–Vlissingen railway and has 3 platforms. This station is less than 100 metres (330 ft) short of being the westernmost station in the Netherlands: that is Vlissingen Souburg, the second station in Vlissingen. The station Vlissingen was formerly called Station Vlissingen-Haven.

The station was largely destroyed in World War II. A new station was built in 1950, designed by Sybold van Ravesteyn, using some parts of the 19th century structure such as the platforms.

The train services are operated by Nederlandse Spoorwegen and the bus services by Connexxion.

== History ==
=== First station (1872-1892) ===
On 1 September 1873 Vlissingen Port was opened on the site of the current station. It was a simple station, mainly consisting of some platforms, and intended mainly for connection to the ferry. At that time the second station of Vlissingen was Vlissingen Town, regarded as the main station. This station was opened a year earlier, on 1 November 1, 1872, and was closer to the centre of town, at the Keersluisbrug along the Canal through Walcheren. The operation of two nearby stations in the port of Vlissingen was too expensive in relation to the limited use, and Vlissingen Town station was closed on 18 July 1894.

=== Second station (1892-1944) ===
In 1892 a much larger building was constructed in the style of the Renaissance, whose entrance was located diagonally on the south-west corner. The building included a royal waiting room for the Dutch monarchy. The station had three platforms provided with a canopy, of which the pillars and a portion of the canopy remain. The building was inaugurated on 15 September 1894. Five years later, in 1899, however, there was a major incident when a steam locomotive from Amsterdam with faulty brakes broke through the platform and into the station buffet. This accident two conductors' lives.

In 1944 Vlissingen Port was irreparably damaged during a bombing raid.

=== Third station (1950-present) ===
Reconstruction took place between October 1949 and September 1950 to a design by architect Sybold van Ravesteyn (1889-1983), whose neo-baroque style is clearly recognisable in the building. The official opening took place on 18 December 1950. Parts of platforms, platform canopy and wall work were retained from the pre-war station. After the war, they also removed the additive 'port' of the name and the station was simply called Vlissingen.

In the eastern part of the main building is a station buffet, with a small raised terrace in front with low stone balustrade. On the west side there is a separate wing with a bicycle facility, behind a free-standing office building. All these parts are attached to the booking hall via the adjacent part of the platforms with each other. The building includes Ravesteyn's characteristic details, like round tilted windows, decorations on the cornices and statues on the facade.

On the outer walls of the station are four ceramic images by Jo Uiterwaal (1897-1972) with representations that refer to the railway and the province of Zeeland. At the entrance of the bicycle facility is the municipality of Vlissingen stone planter with sculpted NS logo and inscription 'Vlissingen 1950'. There is a statue commemorating the electrification of the Zeeland line, manufactured by Philip ten Klooster and unveiled on 17 April 1957.

On the east side of the booking hall were originally ticket offices. In June 2004, these closed, and in late 2010 were replaced by a kiosk. For a long time on the west side of the booking hall there was a bureau de change; after the closure of this at the end of 2001 this part of the station was brought back to its original state.

On 18 March 2010 the station building was designated a national monument and is one of the few designed by Van Ravesteyn station buildings that were not demolished.

== Function ==
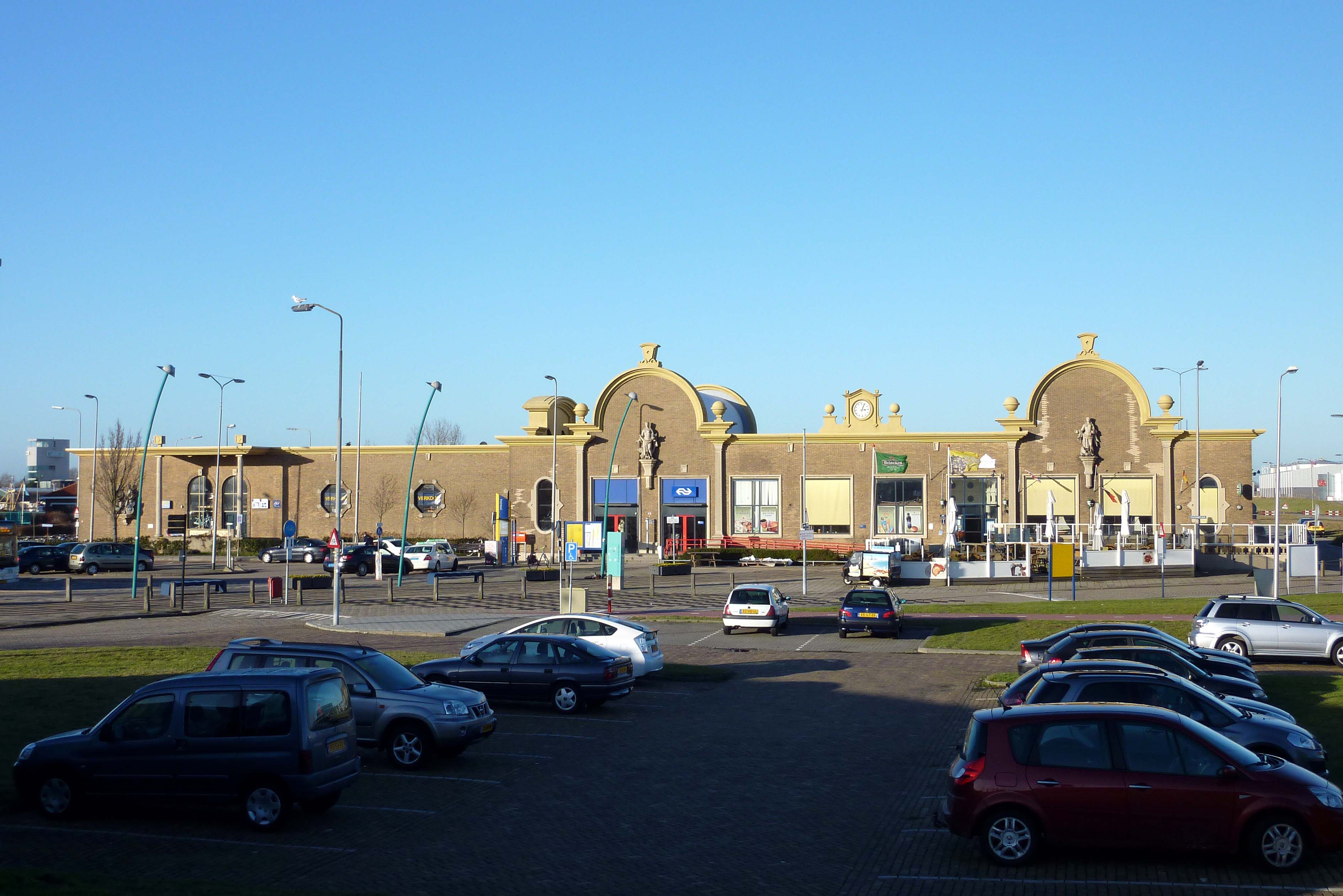
Station Vlissingen

The station in Vlissingen played an important role in the first half of the twentieth century in the connection with the United Kingdom because of the connection with the ferry from the Zeeland Steamship Company. From 1881 until the First World War D-trains (international express trains) travelled over the Zeeland line, where one could travel from London via Vlissingen to Berlin.

Now the station plays an important role connecting Vlissingen to western Zeelandic Flanders, by means of a pedestrian and bicycle ferry to Breskens, operated by Veolia Transport Fast Ferries.

The location near the harbour means there is a greater distance to the city centre. There have been suggestions to move the station to the north. The station would then be near to the HZ University of Applied Sciences, around which the municipality of Vlissingen wants to develop as a centre of knowledge and innovation. This is approximately the same location as where the former station Vlissingen Town was. The plans to move the station met with great resistance in Zeelandic Flanders, because the immediate transition between ferry and train would be lost.

Since the 2013 revision of the railway timetable there are a few direct trains to Leeuwarden and Groningen in the evenings and on Sunday morning. Vlissingen station is directly connected to eight provincial capitals, namely Middelburg, The Hague and Lelystad, and several times a day also Assen, Zwolle, Leeuwarden and Groningen. On Wednesday a runs train to Haarlem.

== Train service ==
The station is served by the following service(s):

- 2x per hour intercity service Amsterdam - Haarlem - Leiden - The Hague - Rotterdam - Dordrecht - Roosendaal - Vlissingen (local service between Roosendaal and Vlissingen)
- 2x per weekday intercity service Roosendaal - Vlissingen (express service between Roosendaal and Vlissingen in the peak direction, only stopping at Middelburg, Goes and Bergen op Zoom. Splits from/combines with the regular Amsterdam - Vlissingen intercity service at Roosendaal)

== Bus services ==
The following bus lines stop at the station:

- 56 Vlissingen Fast Ferrys/Station - Oost-Souburg Station - Middelburg Station

== Gallery ==
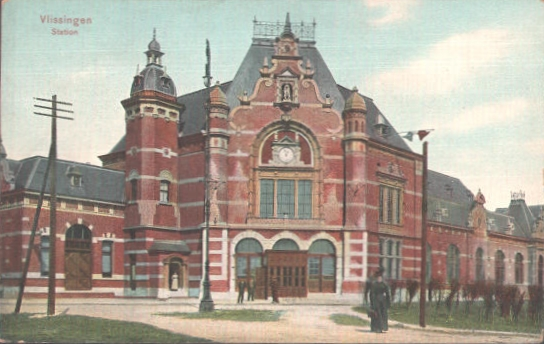
The second station, c. 1900

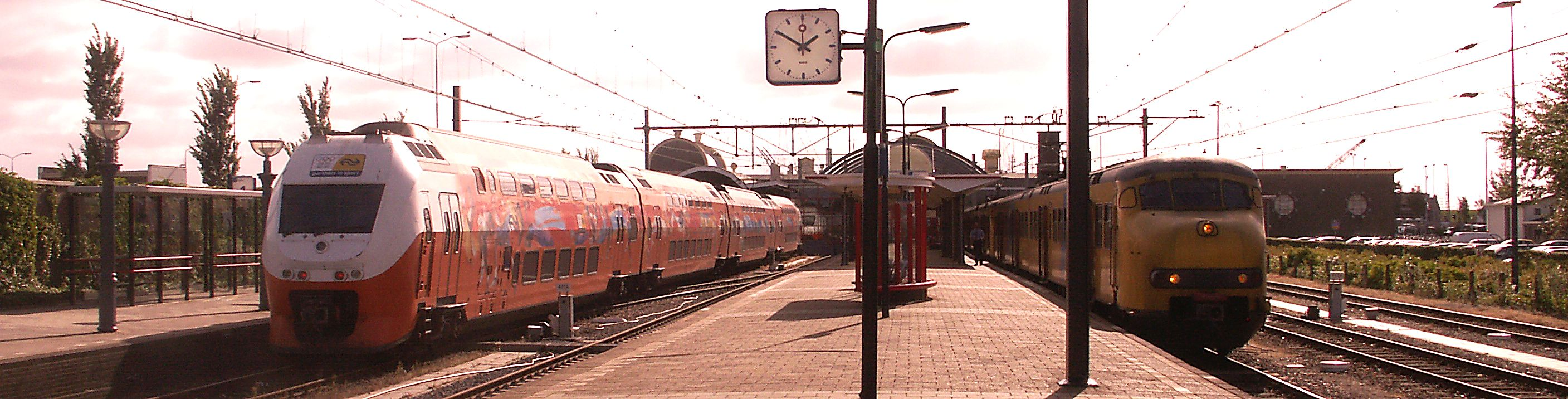
Trains on the island platform at Vlissingen

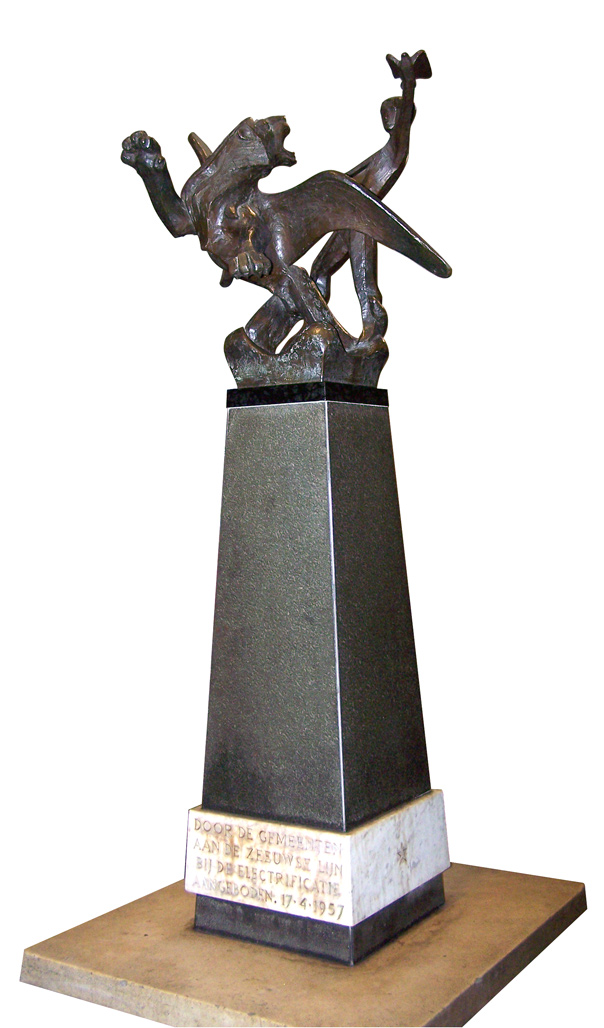
Statue in the booking hall, 1957

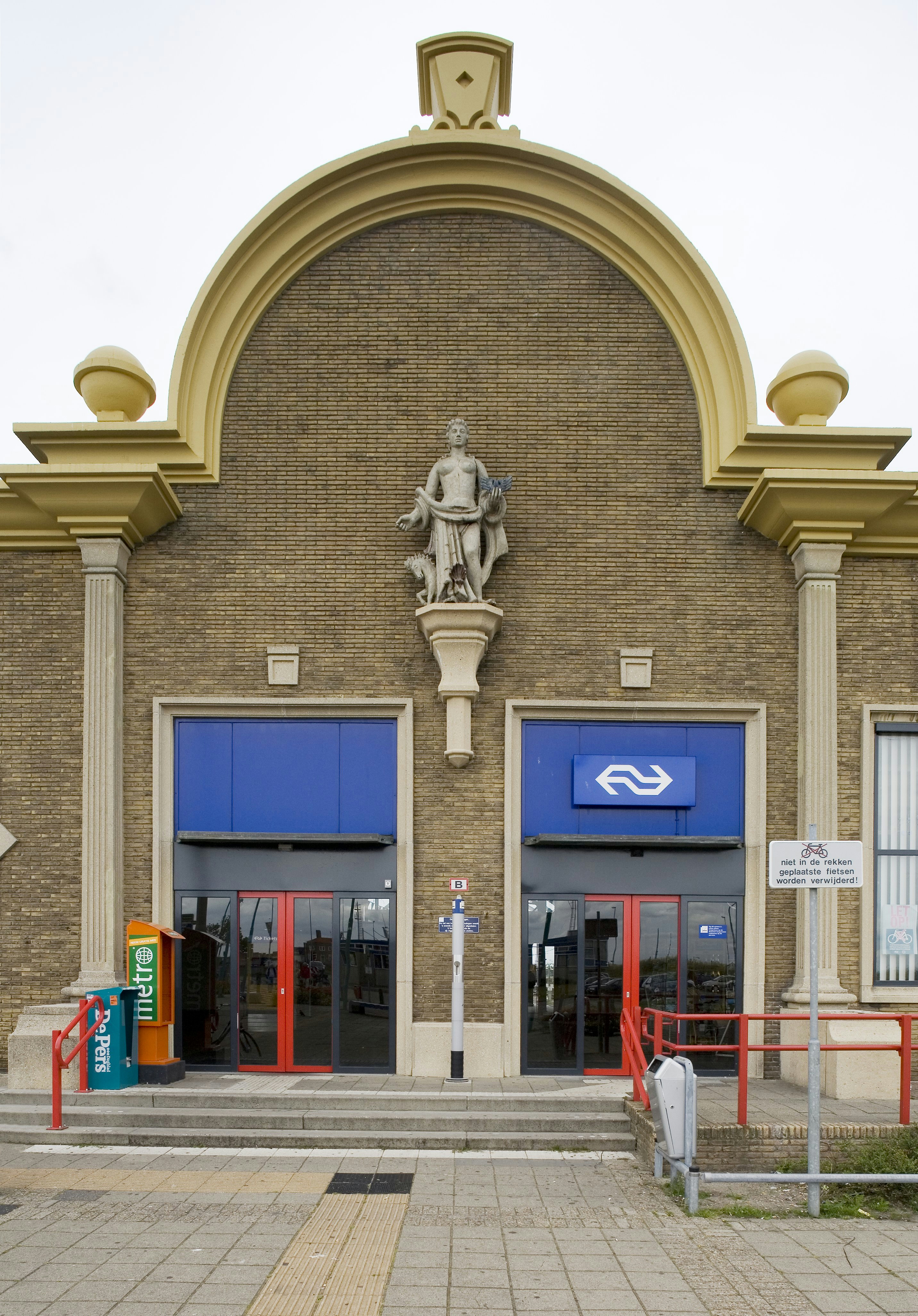
Facade detail, entrance of Vlissingen station in 2007

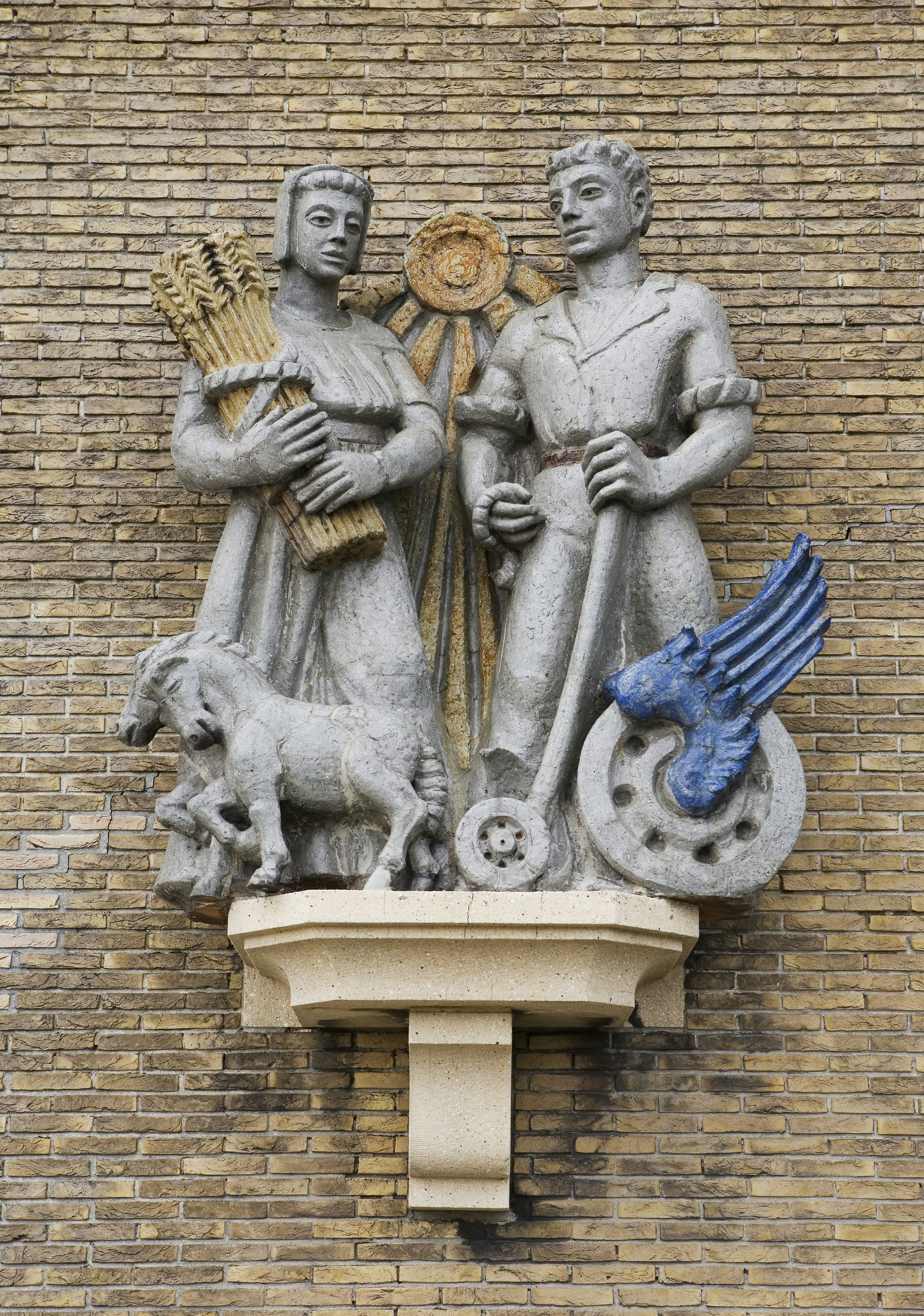
Facade detail, Vlissingen station in 2007

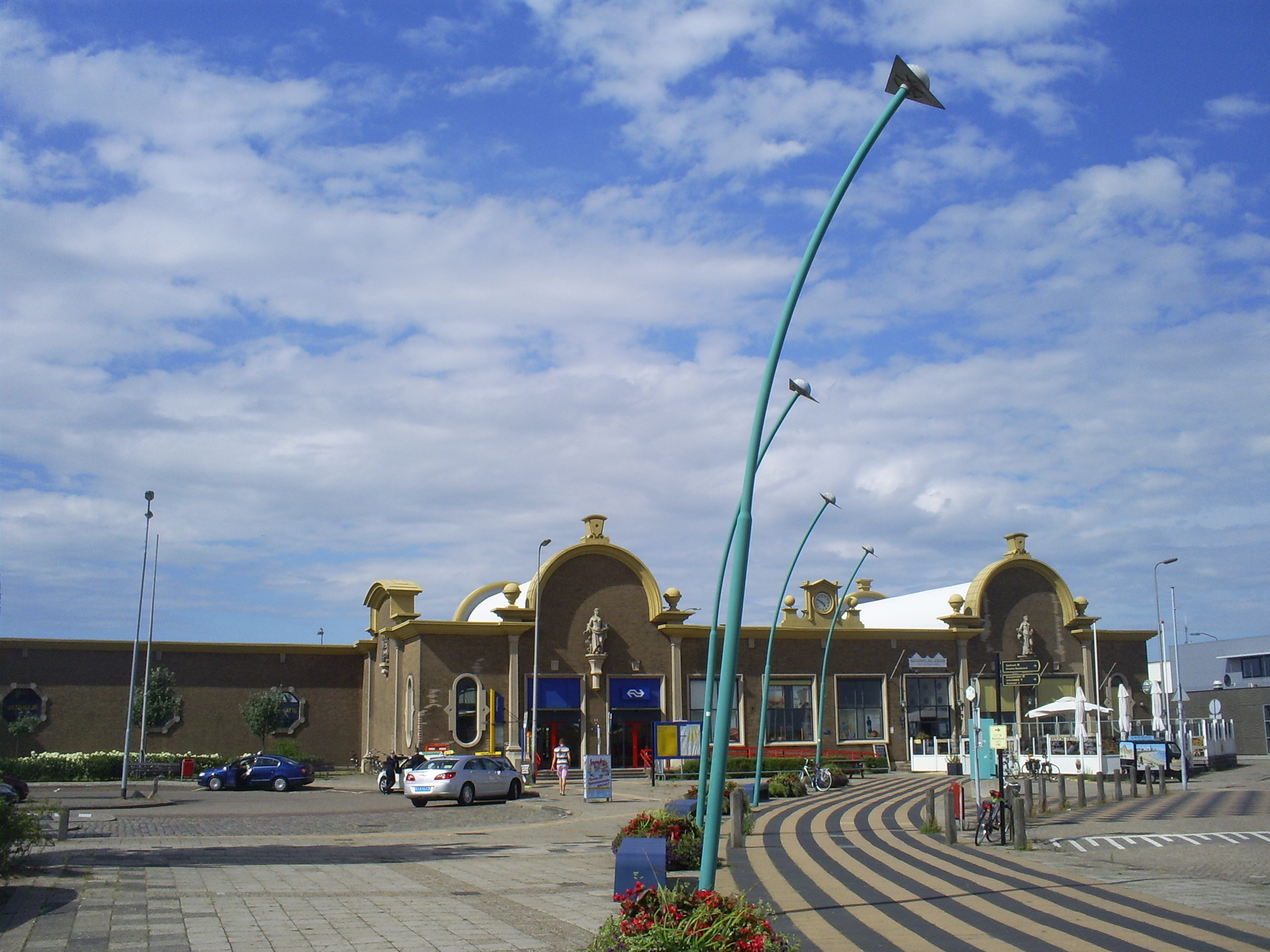

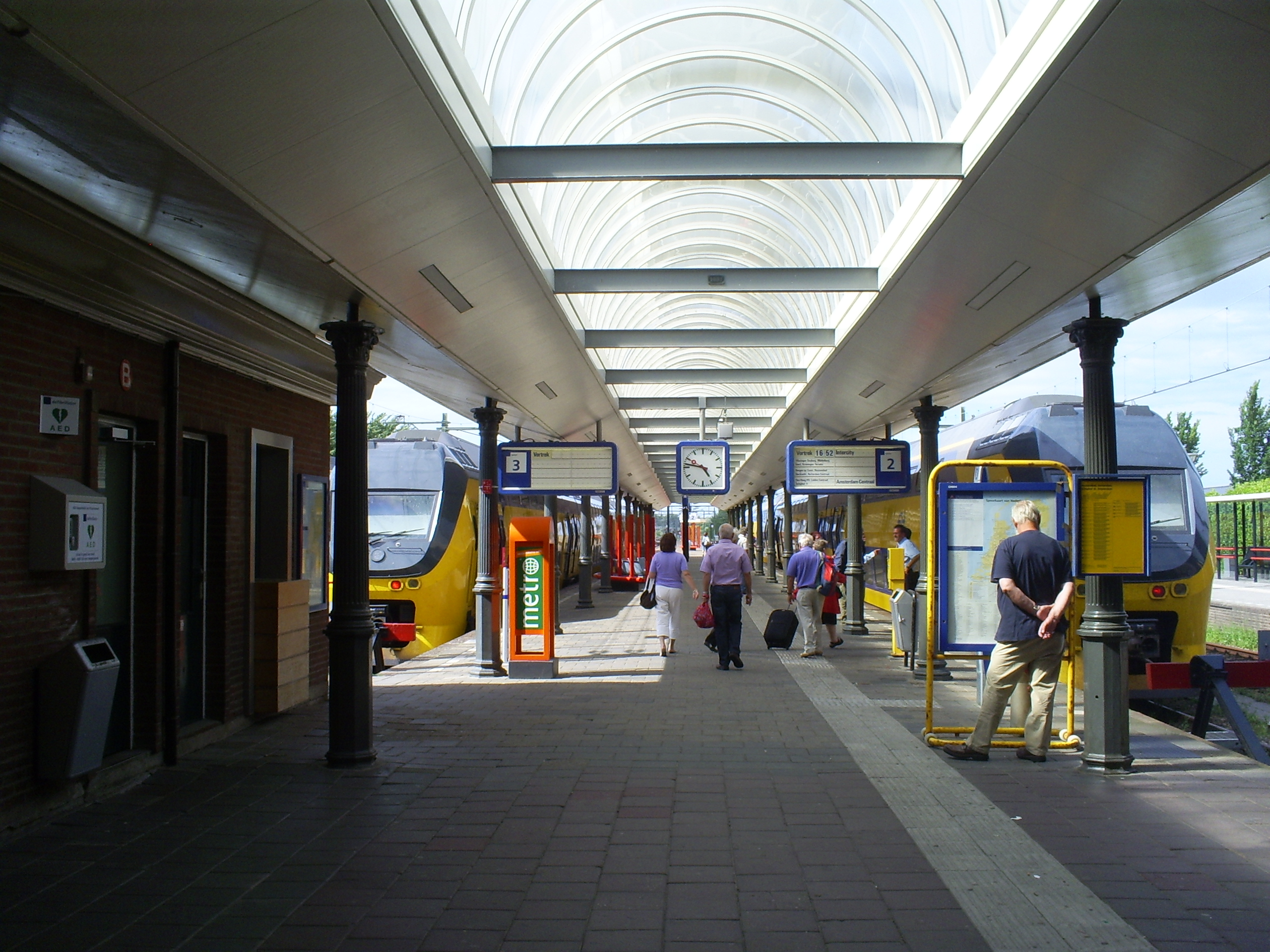

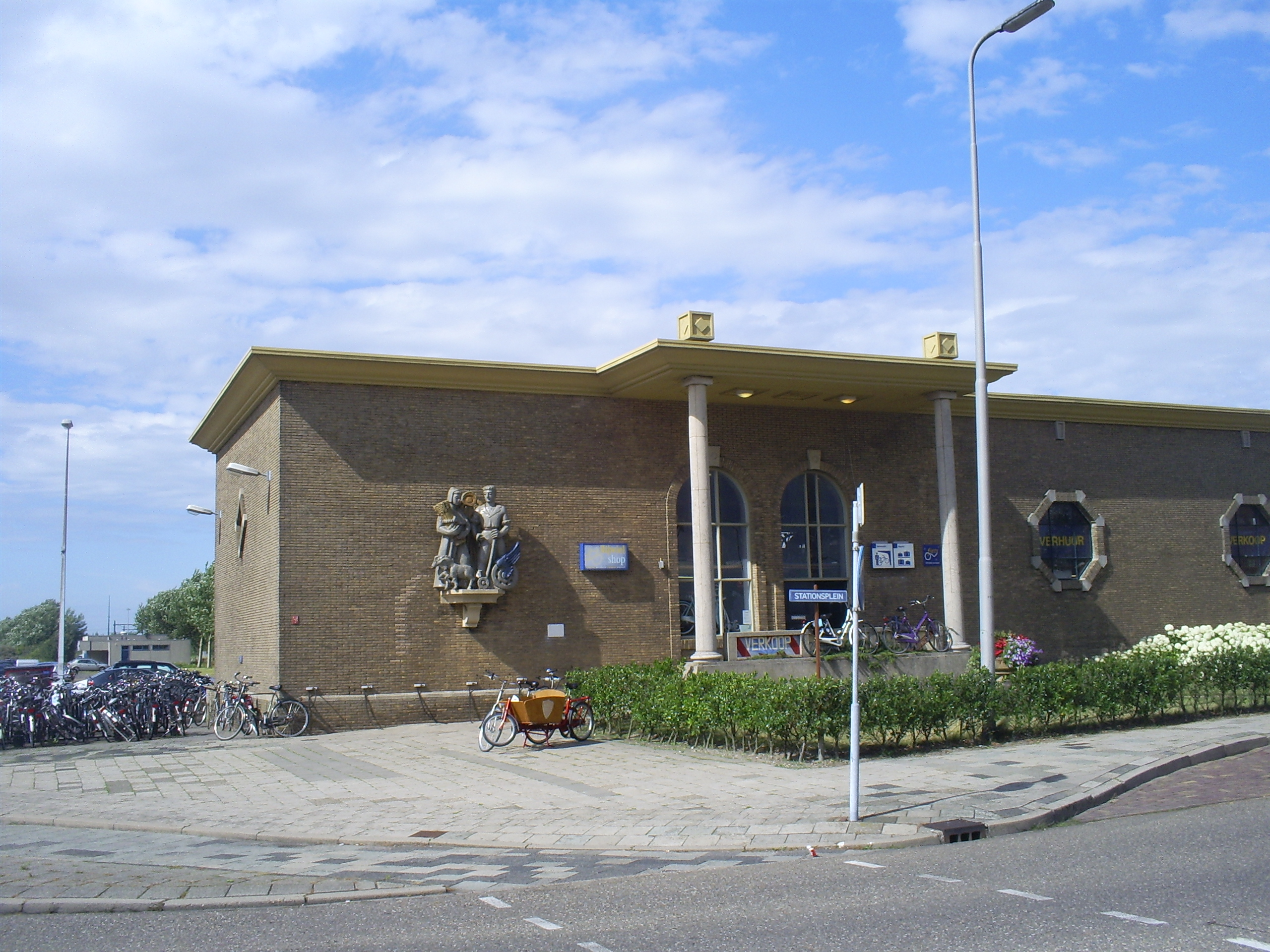

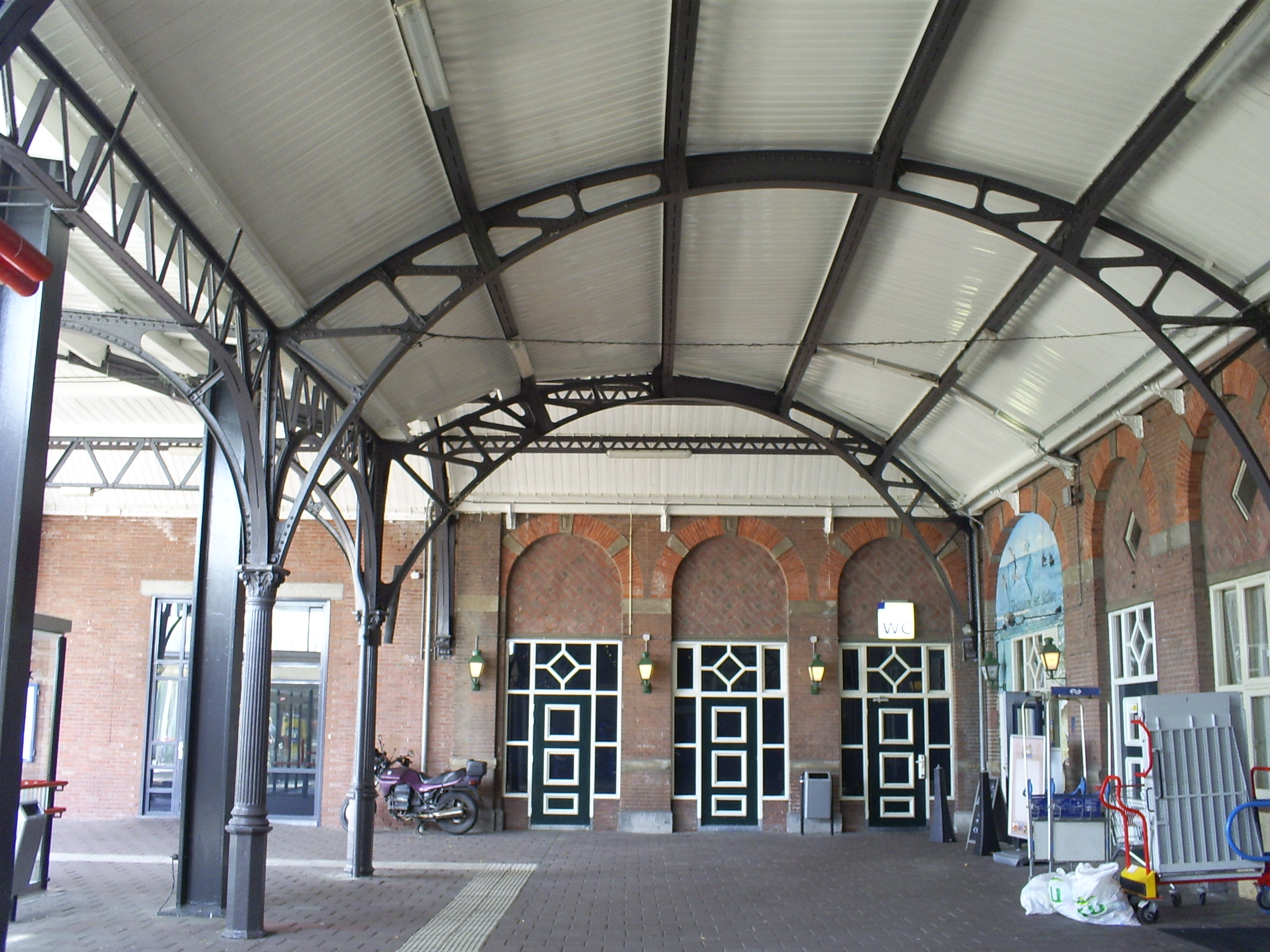

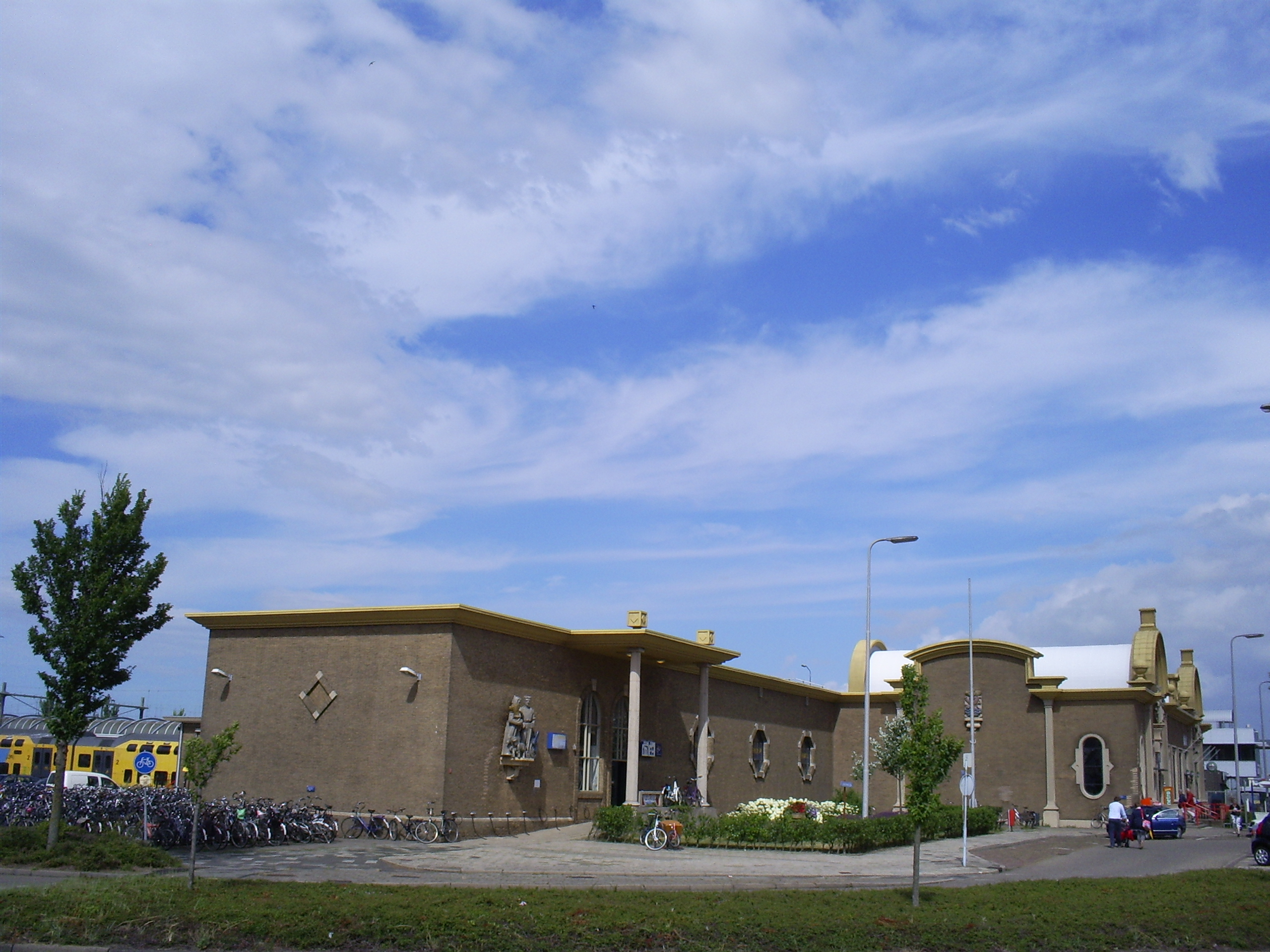

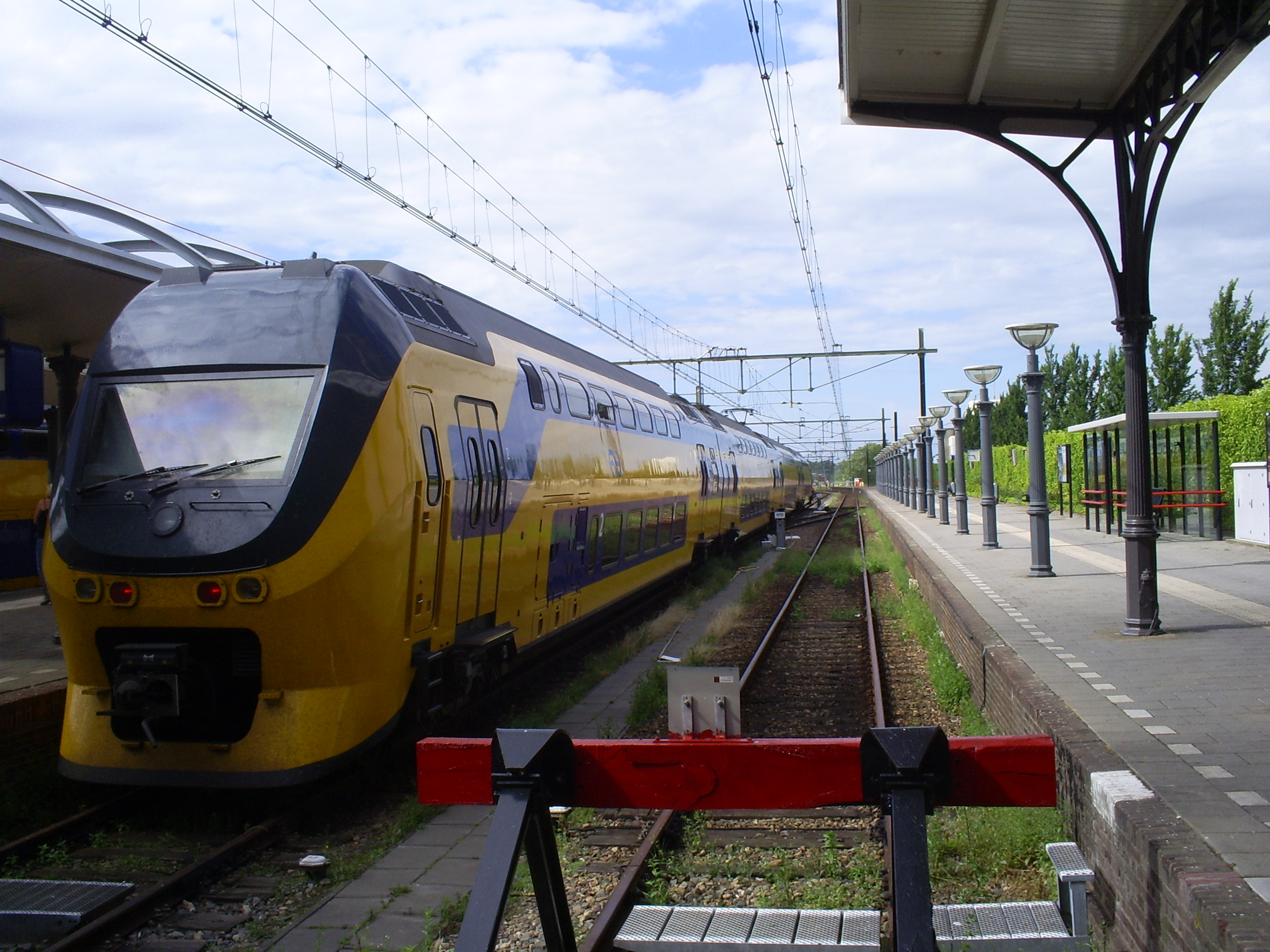

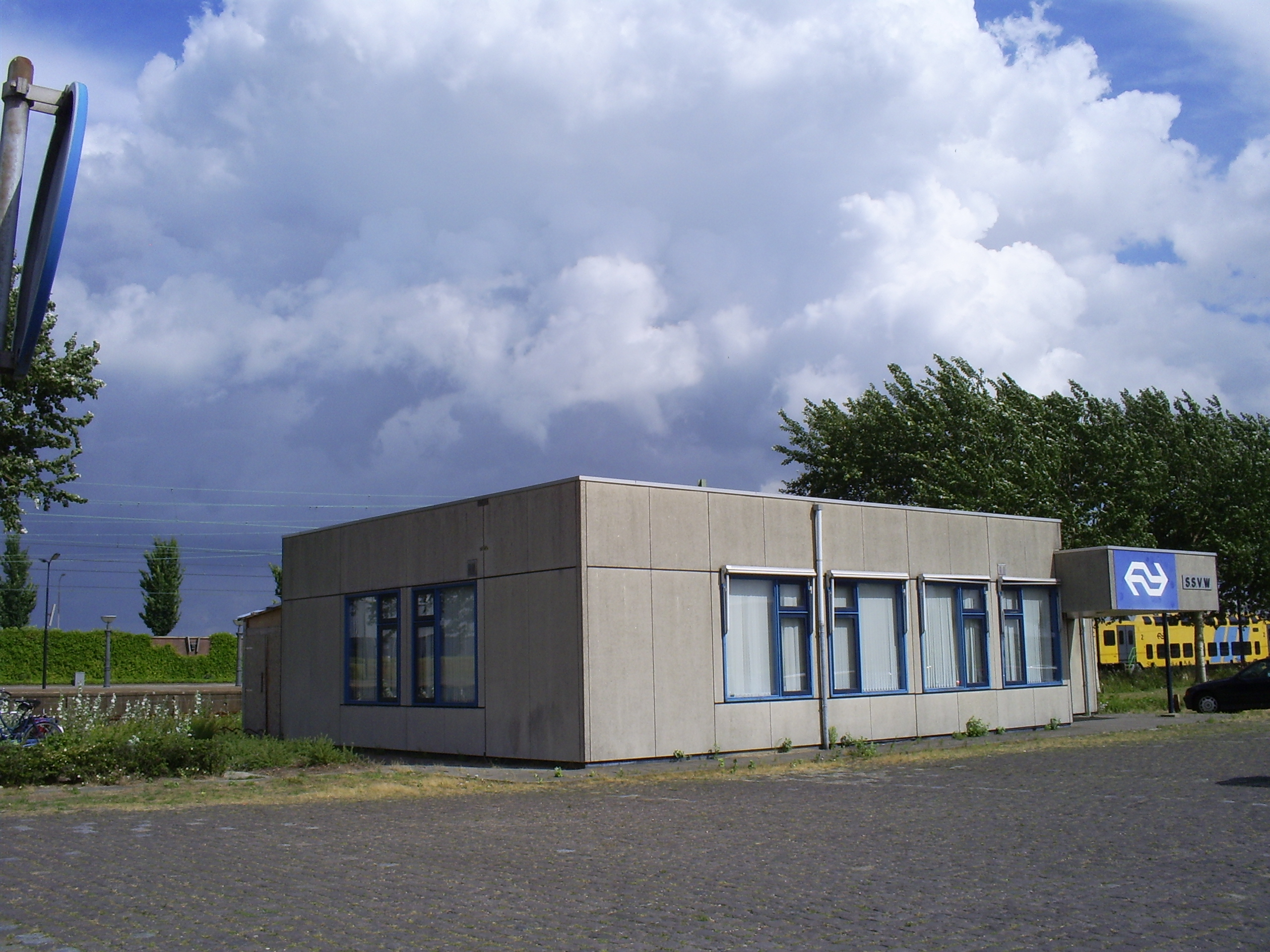
