= Inundation of Walcheren =

Intentional inundation of Walcheren

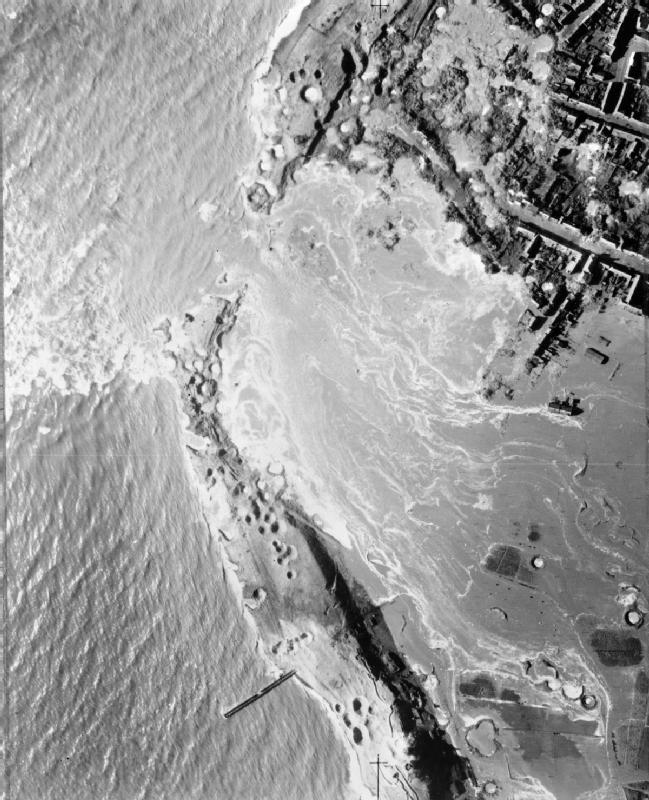
Aerial picture of the breach in the sea dike at Westkapelle after the 3 October 1944 bombardment.

The Inundation of Walcheren was the intentional, but uncontrolled (Note: Controlled military inundations have been a feature of Dutch military defense for centuries. An example are the two Hollandic Water Lines in the period from the 17th century up to the Second World War. Inundations were an important part of the Dutch Grebbe line in 1939. But these military inundations were always "controlled" in three important respects: they were always reversible (pumping stations being present to drain the water after the inundation was no longer necessary); the civilian population was always evacuated beforehand; and the use of salty sea water was avoided to minimize the ecological impact. The plan of the Walcheren inundation had none of these aspects.) military inundation, effected by bombing the sea dikes of the former island of Walcheren in Zeeland by the Allies on and after 3 October 1944 in the context of Operation Infatuate during the Battle of the Scheldt after the Allied Invasion of Normandy during World War II. Though the inundation was justified by military necessity, it is controversial whether it was proportionate in view of the predictable devastating effects for the civilian population, and the ecology of the island. The fact that the breaches in the sea dikes of the island remained open for a very long time (until October 1945), subjecting the island to the full impact of the twice-daily tides, caused severe damage to agricultural land and infrastructure, and severe hardship for the civilian population. Leaving the breaches open for such a long time, which was unavoidable due to the war-time lack of resources making closing impossible, subjected them to scouring by the tides, that widened and deepened them to such an extent that closing them eventually became extremely difficult, necessitating the development of new dike-building techniques, such as the use of caissons. The last breach was closed on 23 October 1945 and the draining of the island took until early 1946. Only after that could rebuilding the infrastructure and reconstructing the housing stock and the island's economy start. Walcheren was spared during the North Sea Flood of 1953 that devastated many other parts of Zeeland.

== Background ==
The rapid advance of the Allied armies in early September 1944 had created a logistics problem: the supply lines from the improvised ports in Normandy to the front had become too long. Using the port of Antwerp would solve this problem, but after the Allied liberation of this city on 3–4 September 1944, the banks of the Scheldt Estuary were still in the hands of the German army, allowing them to block shipping to Antwerp. Especially the former island of Walcheren, at the mouth of the Western Scheldt had become a bastion, bristling with long-range coastal batteries that controlled the sea approaches. In turn this made clearing the mine fields sown by the Germans in the shipping channel to Antwerp by mine sweepers impossible. Clearing Walcheren therefore became a military necessity.

== Planning Operation Infatuate ==
The task to clear the island was given to the First Canadian Army, commanded by lieutenant-general Guy Simonds. The planning for the operation by the Planning Section of the First Canadian Army started on 19 September 1944. Initially, an infantry attack across the island of Zuid-Beveland and the Sloedam, that connected it with Walcheren, supported by airborne landings on both sides of this causeway was foreseen. Though the infantry attack would eventually be implemented in the Battle of Walcheren Causeway, the airborne landings were ruled out, because Operation Market Garden already exhausted the available airborne forces. The Planning Section had initially ruled out an amphibious operation, but general Simonds put that option in play again, though he recognized its drawbacks. Initially he preferred a strategic air offensive, in which the RAF Bomber Command was to "completely flood all parts of the island below high water level" and "systematically attack, day and night, to destroy defenses and wear out the garrison by attrition."

This idea immediately met with opposition. The commander of the airborne army ruled out an airborne operation. (Note: This made an alternative plan for a glider-borne attack on the model of the 1940 German attack on the Belgian fort Eben-Emael moot in any case.) Canadian Combat engineer staff opined that bombing the sea dike at Westkapelle, on the western tip of the island, would not suffice to flood the island. Simonds' superior, lieutenant-general Harry Crerar, was highly skeptical of the plan, but he was soon removed from the scene by illness. Simonds was therefore able to drive through his preference for inundating the island. He based this preference on three considerations: he thought it would undermine the morale of the German 70th Infantry division that manned the defenses of the island (Note: Though this unit was a reserve division, composed of personnel that was earmarked for light duties due to gastro-intestinal disorders;) he hoped to submerge the German military installations on the island; (Note: Though these installations were mainly placed on high ground that would not be submerged by even the highest spring tides.) and to make an integrated German defense impossible. (Note: But the Atlantic Wall of which the Walcheren installations were a part, was based on the concept of independent bases, just because of the eventuality that they would become isolated.) The main objection against these considerations (apart from them not being based on fact) was that inundating the island would hamper the attackers even more than the defenders, as the inundation made tank warfare impossible. (Note: Dutch historians Klep and Schoenmaker concluded in their 1995 study that from a military point of view the advantages of the military inundation were on balance quite minimal.)Despite this obvious downside, the Supreme Allied Commander, general Dwight D. Eisenhower, gave his consent to (the concept behind) the operation on 1 October 1944. In his memoirs he opined:

These breaches, permitting the sea to flood critical sections of the defences, were of great usefulness in an operation that throughout presented unusual difficulties.

It is remarkable that such a decision was not referred to the political level. Eisenhower did not consult the Dutch government-in-exile, despite the fact that Dutch Prime Minister Pieter Sjoerds Gerbrandy, who had got wind of the planned inundation, demanded to see British Prime Minister Winston Churchill about the matter. But Churchill denied any knowledge of the plan.

== Breaching the sea walls ==
Bomber Command attacked the sea dike near Westkapelle on 3 October 1944, dropping 1270 tonnes of bombs on the dike and the village. This breached the dike and killed 152 civilians. The Royal Air Force had dropped leaflets the day before, warning civilians to evacuate, but they had nowhere to go. Many people sheltered in a windmill that was obliterated by a direct hit. As the Canadian engineers had predicted, this breach was not sufficient to flood the island. Therefore, on 7 October, 100 RAF bombers attacked the Nolle dijk (Note: The dike's name derives from the French-built Fort de Nolle (French name Montebello; 1811) whose ruins were still part of the dike in 1944) West of Vlissingen, and the dike near Ritthem, to the east of the canal through Walcheren. This did not contribute to flooding the area west of that natural obstacle, which meant that flooding this area served no military purpose. All of this proved not sufficient and therefore on 11 October the dike between Veere and Vrouwenpolder on the North coast of the island was also bombed and breached, followed by a second bombardment of the breach at Westkapelle on 17 October.

== Military operations ==
While the inundations were slowly but steadily taking effect the RAF bombed German artillery positions. As these were built to withstand aerial bombardment, these generally remained without result, though a few bunkers were taken out by chance direct hits. The bombings killed 40 civilians in Biggekerke and 20 in Vlissingen.

On 1 November 1944 the amphibious landing near Vlissingen commenced. Though initially the landing of 4th Commando remained unopposed, resistance thereafter stiffened, and it was not until 3 November before the last German resistance on the Vlissingen Boulevard (Note: Because the shipping channel in the Scheldt gets very close to shore in this part of Vlissingen, this was an area of particular strategic significance.) was overcome.

The same day the landing at Westkapelle commenced, performed by 41 Commando, 47 Commando, 48 Commando, and 10 Commando, the latter composed of Belgian and Norwegian troopers. Here the German fire was very effective: the landing force lost 172 killed and 200 wounded. The landing was supported by a large Allied flotilla, consisting of 28 ships, including the battleship HMS Warspite and two monitors. German coastal batteries sank nine gunships and damaged ten others. The fire HMS Warspite laid down on the coastal batteries was very effective but (Note: In aiming at a coastal battery near Domburg, gun-layers mistook the reference point of the local water tower for that of a church steeple.) resulted in several 15-inch shells landing in the middle of the town of Domburg, killing 50 civilians. The commandos cleared with some difficulty the dune area between Domburg and Oostkapelle. On 3 November the final resistance was broken, and the Westkapelle landing force made contact with the force in Vlissingen.

The third part of the plan of attack was a frontal assault on the German positions behind the Sloe dam. The Canadian attack started during the night of 31 October, but it was soon blocked. It took two more nights before on 2 November the 5th Canadian Infantry Brigade managed to establish a bridgehead. The Canadians lost 34 killed, 105 wounded and 2 missing-in-action. British losses were 19 killed and 50 wounded. This operation was supported by artillery posted near Breskens across the Scheldt. This inadvertently fired upon the village of Arnemuiden, an official Red-Cross-protected place under the Geneva Convention, for 36 hours, causing 46 civilian dead. To exploit the bridgehead the 156th and 157th brigades performed small amphibious operations to successfully circumvent the German blocking forces at the end of the causeway.

On 5 November 1944 general Wilhelm Daser, the commander of the German 70th Infantry division, surrendered Middelburg, after a column of amphibious 'Buffalo' tracked vehicles approached the city. The last pockets of German resistance on the island were cleared on 8 November.

== The inundation and its consequences ==
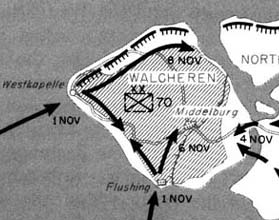
Map of the inundated areas on Walcheren

The topography of Walcheren is similar to an atoll, without the coral reef. The rim is formed by a wide zone of high dunes. The "lagoon" in the middle is normally dry land, but was filled in after the inundation was completed. But it was a shallow lagoon, where certain parts remained permanently dry (this is where one would find the towns, like Middelburg and Souburg), other parts were permanently submerged (especially the "dip" around Aagtekerke in the center of the island), and other parts periodically flooded at high tide, and fell dry at low tide. (Note: The difference between high and low tide is 4 meters on average at Vlissingen.) There were enormous movements of water during the changes in tides, that had to stream through the breaches in the dikes, widening and deepening them constantly.

Because the filling of this "lagoon" only proceeded gradually, most people escaped drowning. But the livestock were not so lucky. When Walcheren was liberated 600 cows out of a total of 9,800 survived, and 500 horses out of 2,500.

The effect on the soil was more insidious. The salty seawater caused salinization that made the erstwhile very fertile Zeeland clay completely infertile for years to come. Furthermore, the soil was "rearranged" by the churning water, scraping 50 cm off the top soil in certain places, and obliterating drainage ditches, roads, bridges, and vegetation. Buildings were damaged both by the brute force of the waves, and the more insidious effects of infusion of salt in bricks, not to mention the mould. According to one source, of 19,000 dwellings, 3,700 were destroyed, 7,700 had severe damage, and 3,600 sustained minor damage.

These statistics should be put in the context of total war damage as a consequence of inundations, as other parts of the Netherlands had also been inundated in the course of World War II, mostly by the German Wehrmacht, like the inundations of other parts of Zeeland, like Zeelandic Flanders, Zuid-Beveland, Tholen, and Schouwen-Duiveland, and the Inundation of the Wieringermeer (though this was a fresh-water inundation). In the spring of 1945 77,100 ha of Dutch arable land had been submerged by sea water, of which 43,180 ha in the province of Zeeland. Of this Zeeland total 16,100 ha was located in Walcheren.

=== Case study: the "water time" in Koudekerke ===
The experiences of the civilian population during the period after the hostilities ended, and life more or less returned to "normal," of course differed from location to location. An example is the municipality of Koudekerke (with the village of that name as its administrative center) which is located halfway between Vlissingen and Westkapelle on the Southern coast of Walcheren. Its website has a very detailed history of the events during the period from the preparatory aerial bombardments in September, through the breaching of the dikes, and the fighting to clear the Atlantic Wall installations, to finally what the locals call the watertijd ("Water Time"), that lasted until the island was reclaimed from the sea. The following is an excerpt of that website's narrative.

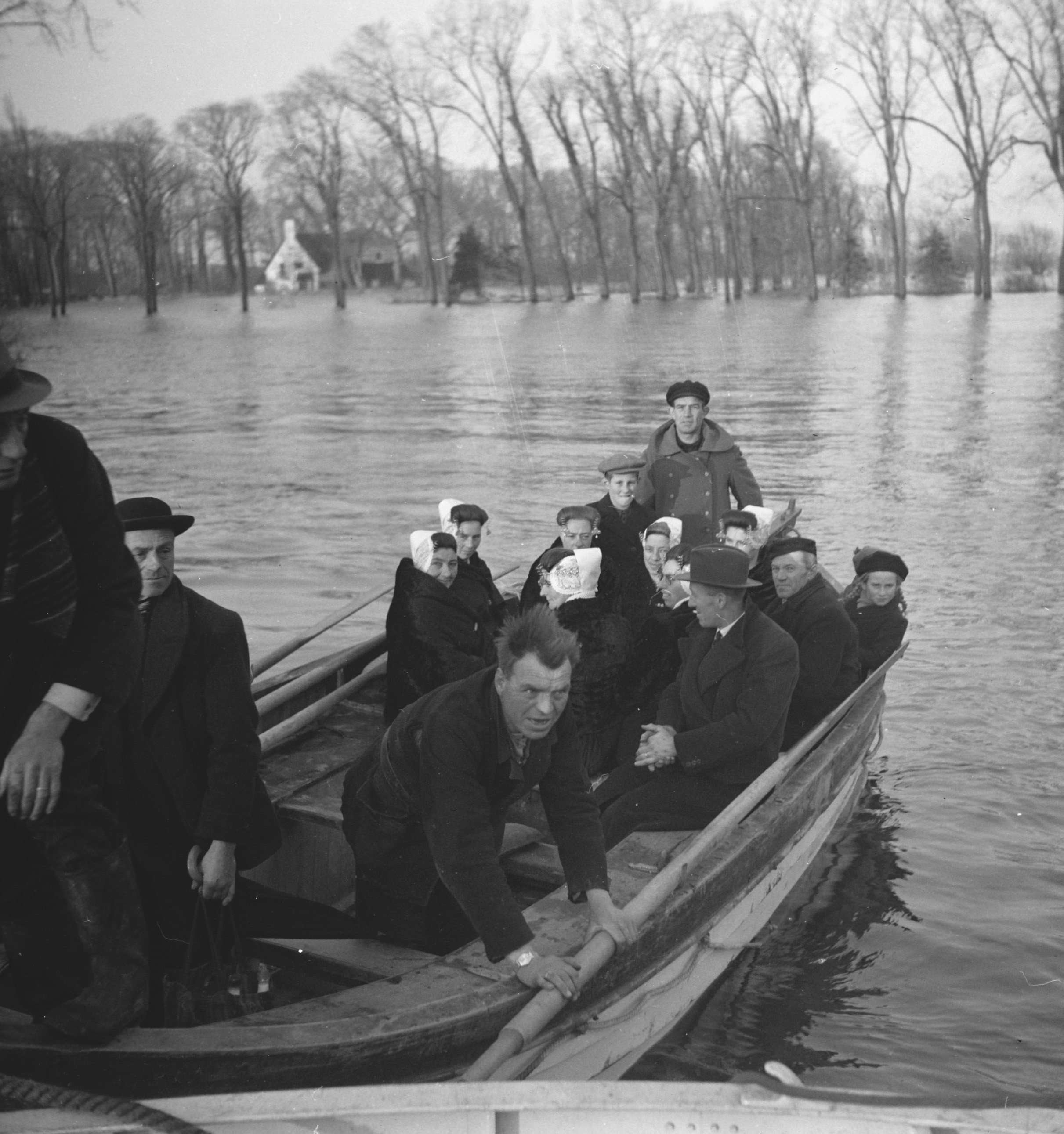
Women in traditional Zeeland regional attire being transported across the inundated area

The slow pace of the inundation after 2 October, in which the water crept closer and closer with every high tide, until it eventually covered most of the surroundings of the village, and even the outer buildings, left time to organize the rescue of the harvest that had just finished before the inundation started. Agricultural products were transported from the individual farms to the church in the village center, that was one of the highest points in the neighborhood. Many cows could be rescued by putting them on improvised elevated platforms in the stables, and hay (also recently harvested) could likewise be put in attics. But many animals had to be subjected to what were administratively called "emergency slaughters" (all killing of livestock was regulated under the Rationing regulations, and needed special permission).

The attics of the houses were in any case the places where most people put their furniture, and started to dwell, as the ground floors became uninhabitable. Improvised jetties were built to allow dry-footed passage from house to house in the village. Transportation further afield was done with a regular "ferry service" to Vlissingen organised by the Provincial Ferry Service, that used life-boats from the passenger ship Willem Ruys that happened to be in the Vlissingen shipyard for maintenance at the time.

Freight was transported to and from Middelburg by the two local courier services, who forgot that they were competitors for the duration. Potable water was daily transported by horse cart at low tide from a German bunker that held a 5,000 gallon tank or cistern to the village center, where people would get their daily allowance.

The deserted, but well-stocked German bunkers were also a rich hunting ground for food and other supplies that were made "prize of war" ("the Allied troops were solely interested in the liquor stores") and were integrated in the official Distribution Service by the local government, enabling the population to use its ration books. The nutrition situation actually improved a bit, compared to the weeks before the inundation. Walcheren thus escaped the Dutch famine that later would devastate Occupied Holland, especially after the sea approaches to Antwerp had been cleared of naval mines, and shipping supplies to the port came online. (Note: The fact that the civilian population in Walcheren had to be supplied via the military supply channels, and so formed a burden on the supply for military purposes is, from hindsight, another reason why the inundation would seem to have been a bad decision, even from a military point of view.) Though the rations were also from time to time augmented by cargo washed ashore from ships that occasionally hit stray mines.

But despite this successful improvisation, the situation would have become untenable if a large part of the "nonessential" population had not been evacuated to other places in liberated Zuid-Beveland and North Brabant after the hostilities in those areas ended. (Note: The following is a quote from a report on the situation from a Civil-Affairs officer: "The semi-inundated villages of the island also were crowded with refugees, even the upper stories of houses whose ground floors were covered with two feet of water being used to the extent that whole families of up to twelve people were living in one room… Public utilities with one exception were not functioning: there was no rain water (rain water only from house cisterns was available), practically all wells were salted: there was no electric light or power; there were however limited supplies of gas in certain urban areas up to 1 hr. per diem at low pressure; there were no telephone facilities; the railroad was out of commission; the FLUSHING-MIDDELBURG-VEERE canal was tidal, due to the destruction of all locks and badly blocked, whilst the only road into Walcheren island was so damaged as to be available only for essential military traffic".) The lack of electricity and the impossibility of normal heating must have made life hard to bear in the winter months in this inundated village. And even after the island had been drained, and electric power generation had been fully restored, in many cases people had to await the rewiring of their homes, before they could use electricity again, a process that took until far in 1946.

== Closing the breaches and draining the island ==
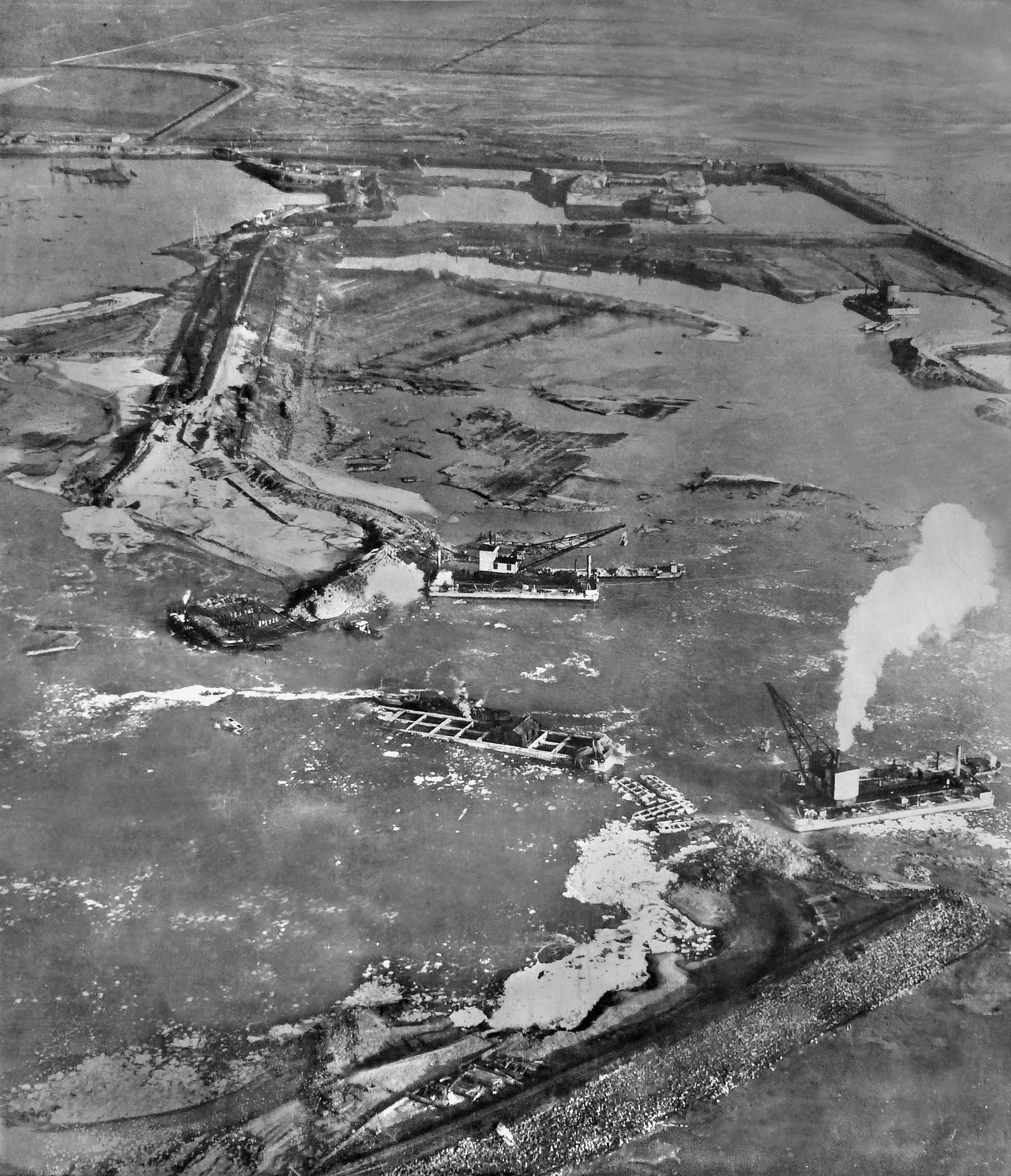
Closing the breach near Ritthem in February 1946

Immediately after the German surrender, attempts to close the breaches in the dikes started, with the formation of the Dienst Droogmaking Walcheren (Service for the Reclamation of Walcheren). This organisation was set up by Rijkswaterstaat to oversee the repair works, and was led by Pieter Philippus Jansen. Due to a lack of dike-building materials, (Note: Like e.g. willow-brushwood for fascine-mats that in the Netherlands usually formed the foundation for dikes) heavy construction equipment, and skilled dike workers, and the damage to roads, bridges and other infrastructure, and the impediment of extensive minefields in the access areas, those attempts were doomed to fail. Only in the summer of 1945, after the end of hostilities in Europe, and when these deficiencies had been addressed, could the closing of the breaches start in earnest.

Difficulties in commencing the rehabilitation works included the fact that many dredgers were still located in areas of the occupied Netherlands, and around 25% of the Dutch dredging fleet had been confiscated and transported to Germany. Works at the main breach locations were divided up between four contractors.

By October 1945, the contractors and Rijkswaterstaat had managed to assemble a fleet of 14 suction dredgers and bucket dredgers, 135 barges, 61 tugboats, 73 landing craft, 19 floating cranes, 52 bulldozers and draglines along with motor vehicles and other equipment.

A particular problem was that by that time the breaches had become so wide and deep, that normal earth-moving operations were unable to overcome the strength of the tidal flows. The total width of the breaches had grown to three kilometers. The depth of the tidal trenches was tens of meters in places. For this reason new techniques of hydraulic engineering had to be developed. To block the deepest parts of the breaches surplus caissons, originally built for the Phoenix breakwaters of the Mulberry harbours, were given a new application. Although there was an initial reluctance on the part of some of the contractors to use these units, their eventual implementation proved so successful that similar units would later be used on the closure of the Brielse Maasdam in 1950 and the Braakman in 1952. Once the strength of the tidal flow was thus broken, more traditional techniques could be successfully employed.

The breach of the Nolle dijk near Vlissingen was first filled on 3 September 1945, but the dike broke again three weeks later. This breach was finally closed on 2 October 1945, almost exactly a year after it was formed. The breach at Westkapelle was closed on 12 October, followed by the Veere breach on 23 October. The area east of the canal through Walcheren took longer. The breach at Fort Rammekens near Ritthem was finally closed on 5 February 1946.

In the period between May 18, 1945 to February 2, 1946 (almost 9 months) around 4 million m3 of sand, 140,000,000 kg of rocks, 3,600,000 bundles of wicker were used. In addition to the many hands, huge machinery was involved in carrying out the repairs. This included 12 suction dredgers and 20 tugs.

But by closing the breaches only the tidal movement was stopped. The mass of water still had to be removed. The Dutch experience with the draining of the recently reclaimed Wieringermeer and Noordoostpolder would seem to point to using pumping stations. But the capacity of the existing pumping stations, used for the normal draining of accumulated precipitation, was insufficient. Therefore an ingenious method was used to let nature take its course. A breach was made in the western levee of the canal through Walcheren, that formed the eastern border of the flooded area. By simply opening the locks at either end of the canal in Veere and Vlissingen at ebb tide, the bulk of the water mass was drained by mid-December 1945. Thereafter the existing pumping stations were able to drain the remaining water, though it was necessary to reopen the preexisting drainage ditches and canals, that had silted up. The island was "dry" again in early 1946.

== Aftermath ==
Only then could the Wederopbouw (the post-War era of reconstruction) for Walcheren begin. One "advantage" of the fact that the landscape had been "erased" by the flood was that the usual resistance against mandatory re-allocation of agricultural parcels, known as land consolidation, was more easily overcome. A comprehensive re-allocation scheme was implemented in the immediately following years, with a doubling of average parcel size as a positive outcome. Meanwhile desalinization restored the productivity of the land. From the 1950s Walcheren became one of the most productive agricultural areas in the Netherlands.

Ironically, when the North Sea Flood of 1953 devastated the rest of Zeeland, Walcheren was for the large part spared.

In 1977 Protocol I, amending the Geneva Conventions with respect to the protection of the victims of armed conflict was adopted. Art. 53 and 56 outlaw attacks with intent to destroy on dams and dikes. The protocol has been ratified by 174 contracting parties, including Canada (1990), the Netherlands (1987) and the UK (1998).

An account of the work done to repair the breaches and reclaim the island from the sea is given in the historical novel Het verjaagde water by A. den Doolaard.

== Gallery ==
Newsreel, dated October 1945: Overview of the situation on Walcheren five months after the end of WWII. The island is still submerged for the most part after the breaching of the dikes in October 1944. A boat trip around the inundated ares shows the inflicted damage.

Newsreel, dated December 1945: Shows the situation after the closing of the breaches. Certain submerged areas have become dry again. Orchards and farmland have changed into dead soil; roads have been destroyed; tombstones in a cemetery have been overturned; houses have collapsed; the dry area is covered in a thick layer of silt. People are busy cleaning up everywhere.

Newsreel, dated February 1946: various images of areas in reclaimed Walcheren.

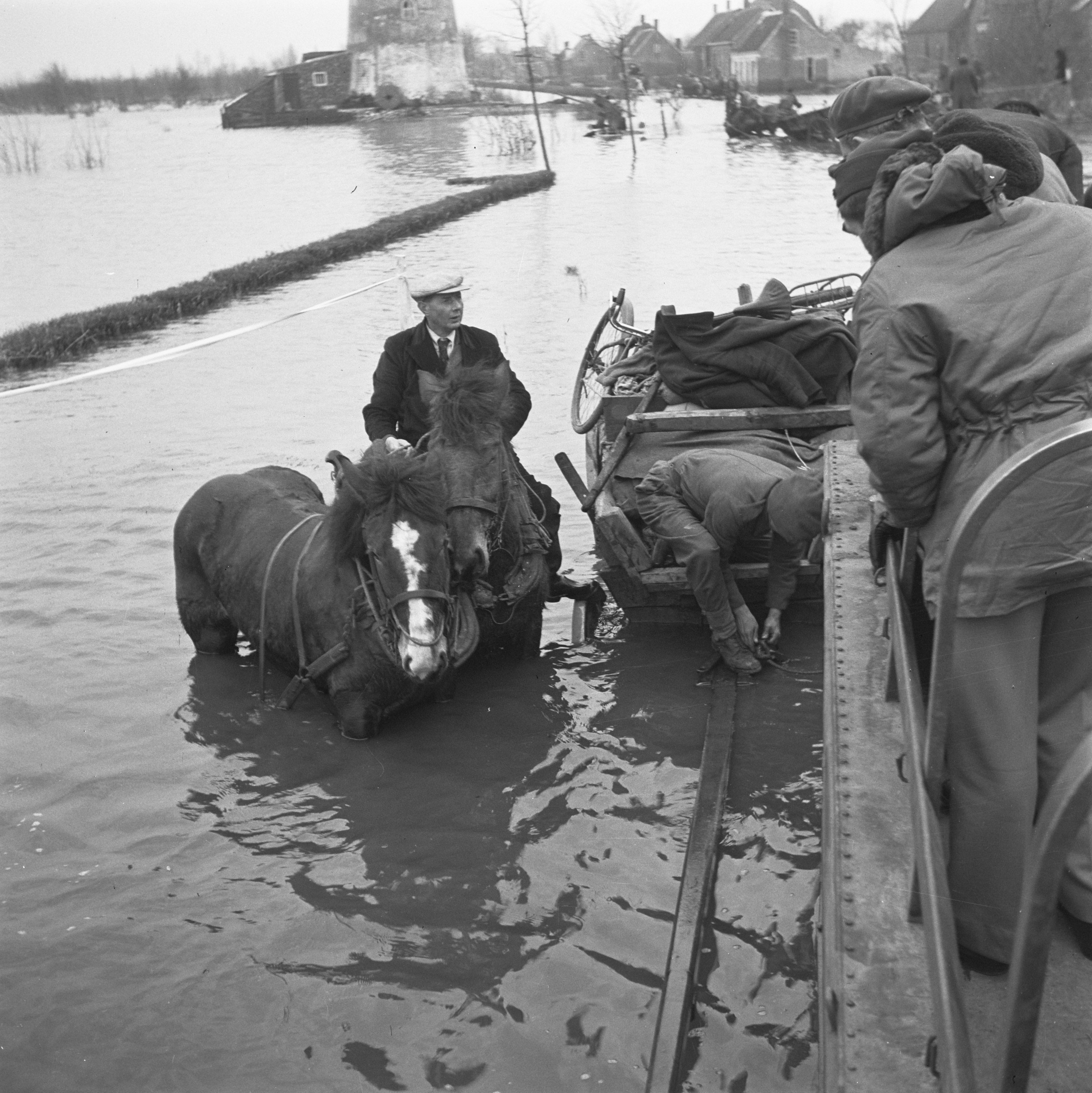
Minister Clement Attlee visiting inundated Walcheren in March 1945

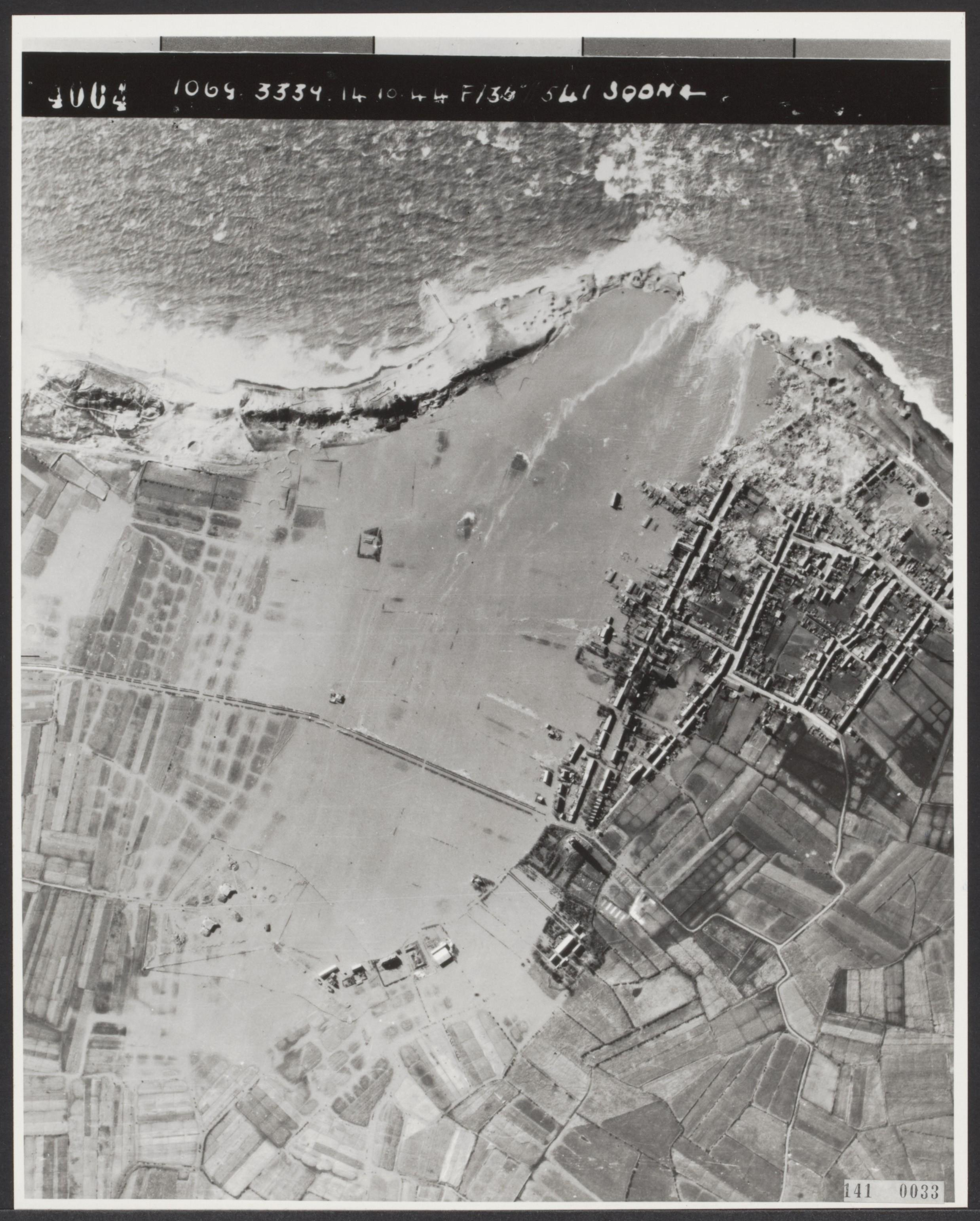
The bombed dike near Westkapelle

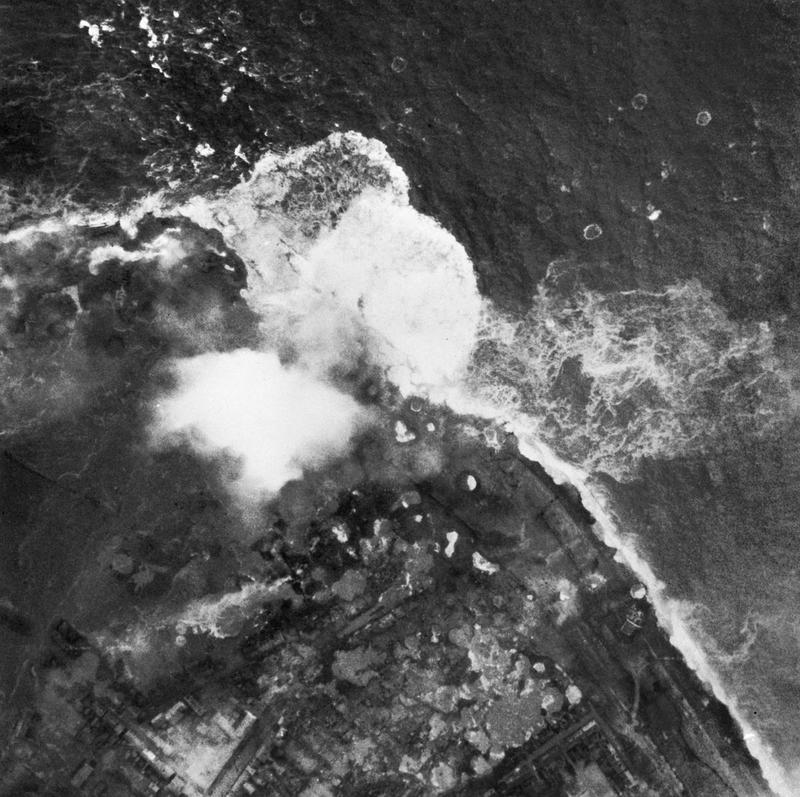
Aerial photograph of bombs exploding on dike on 3 October 1944

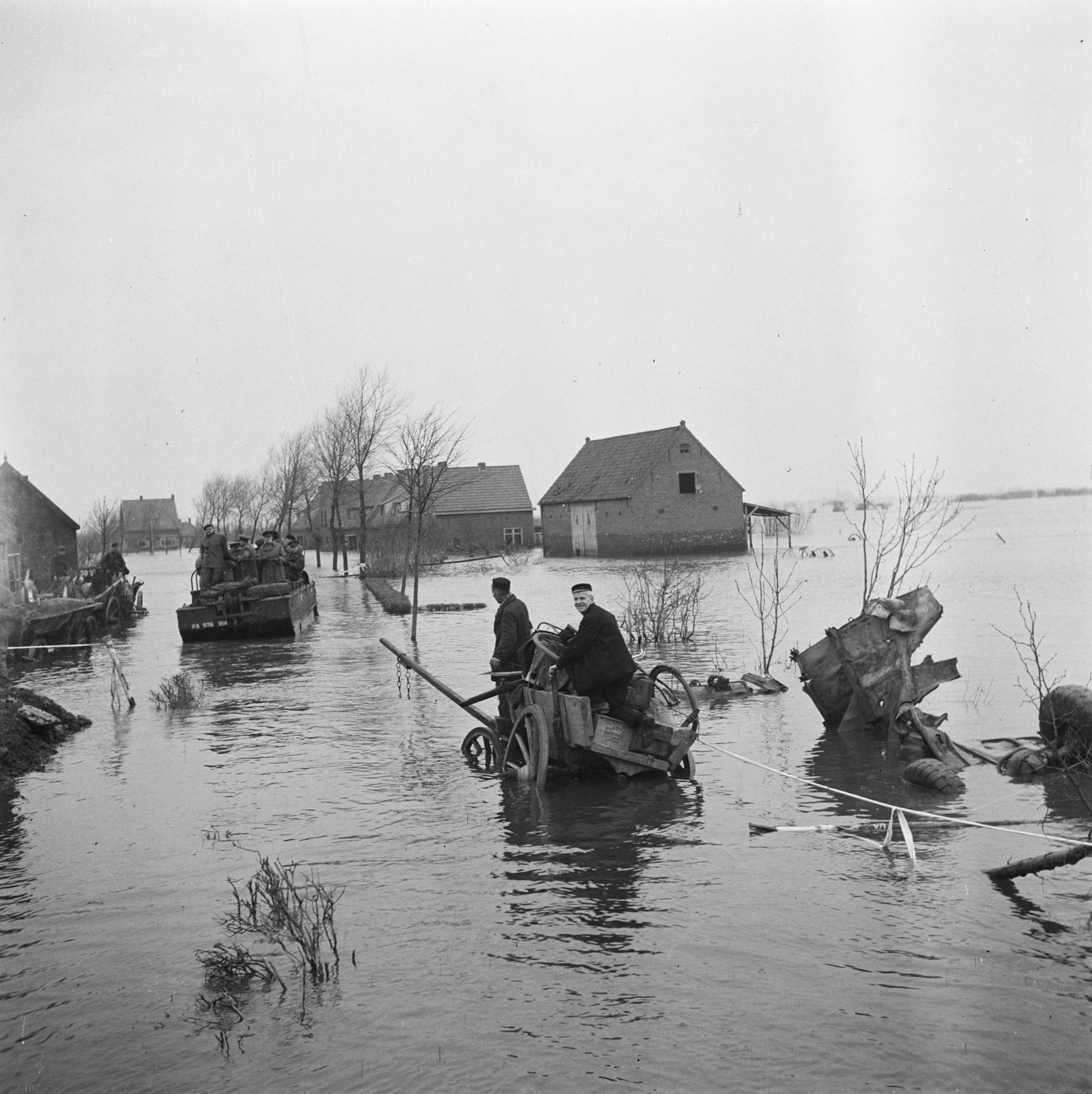
People making the best of it in spring 1945

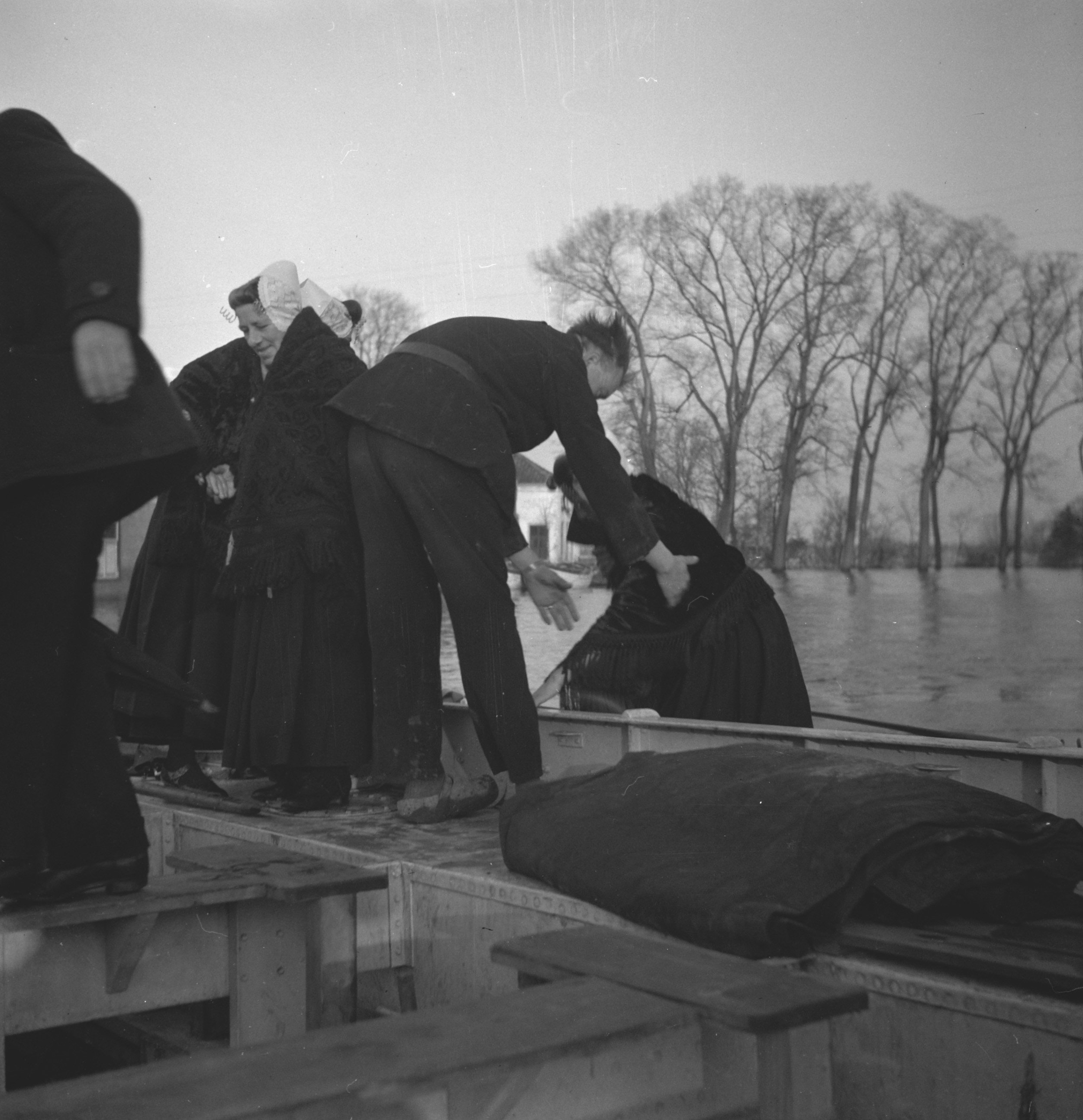
Women in traditional regional attire in Middelburg

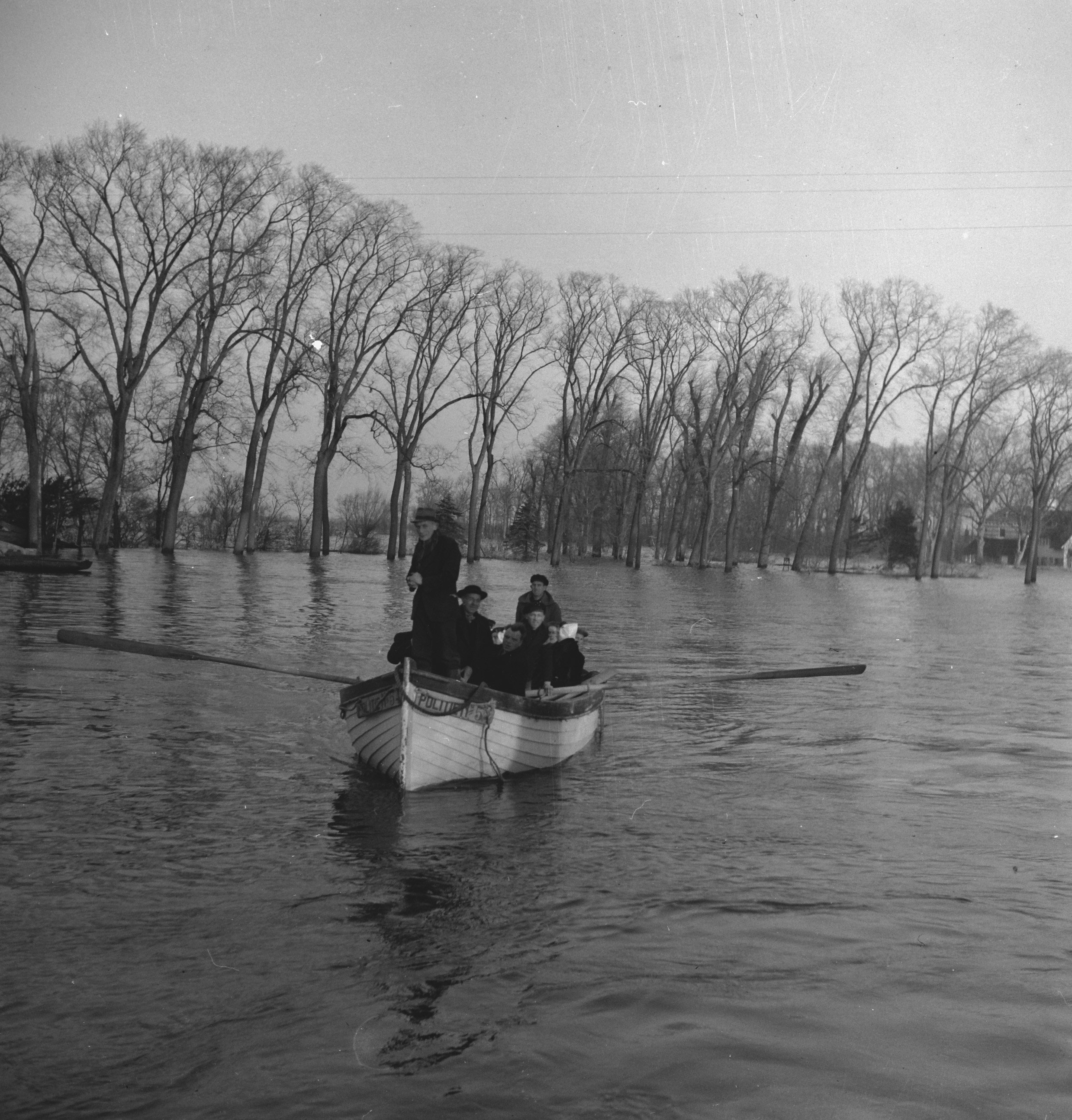
Middelburg, February 1945

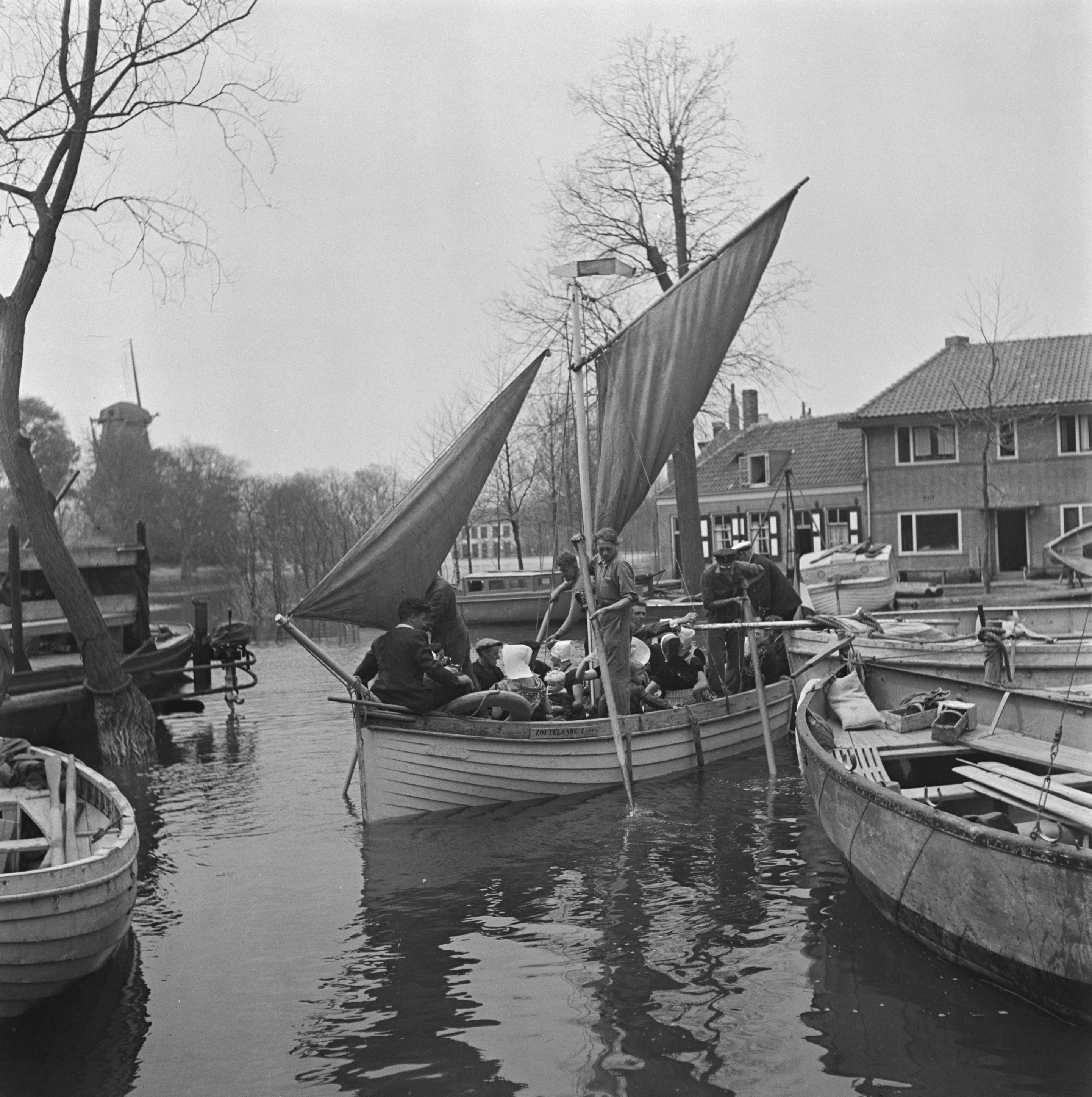
Improvised ferry.

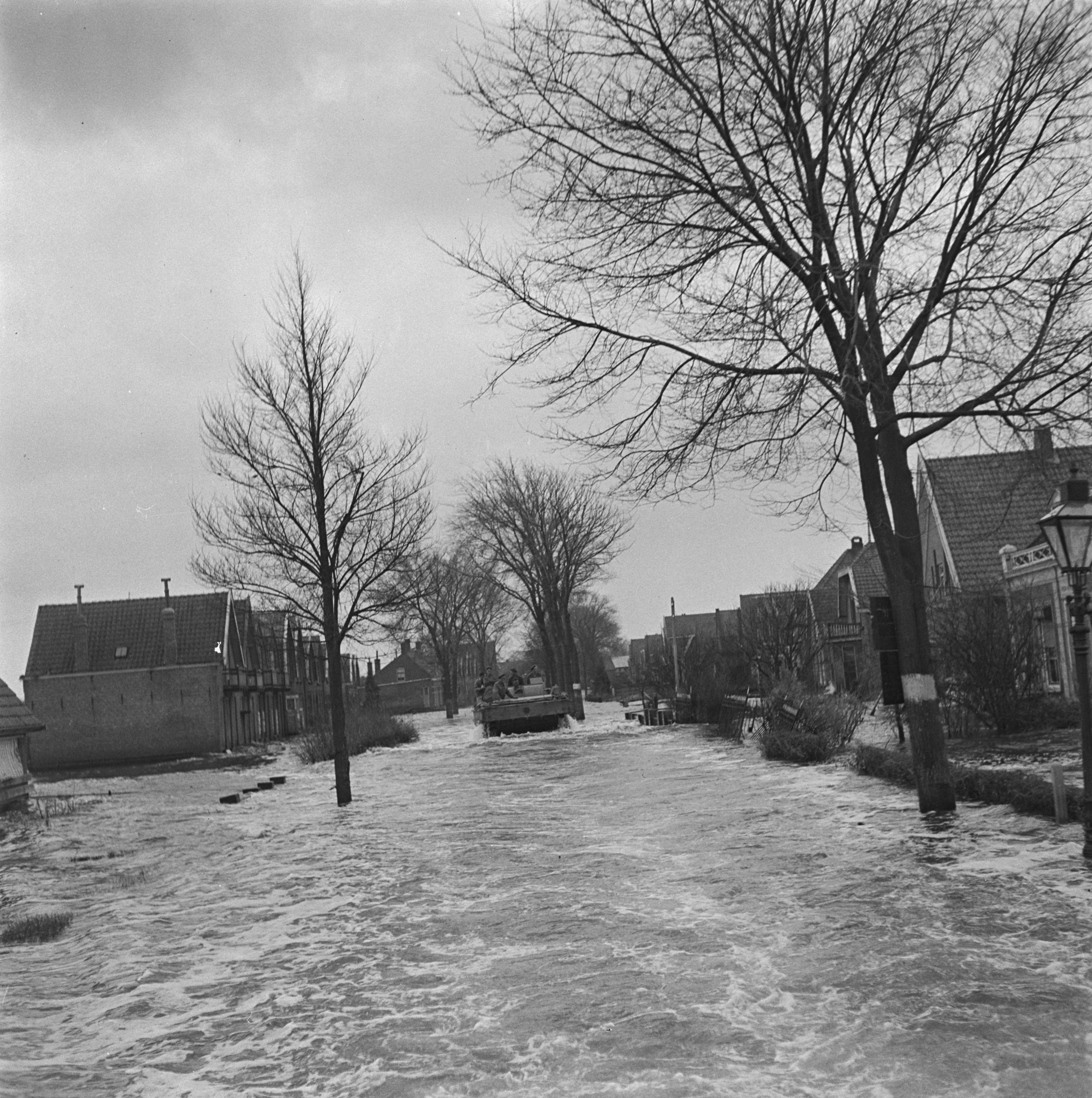
Terrapin traversing a submerged village street.

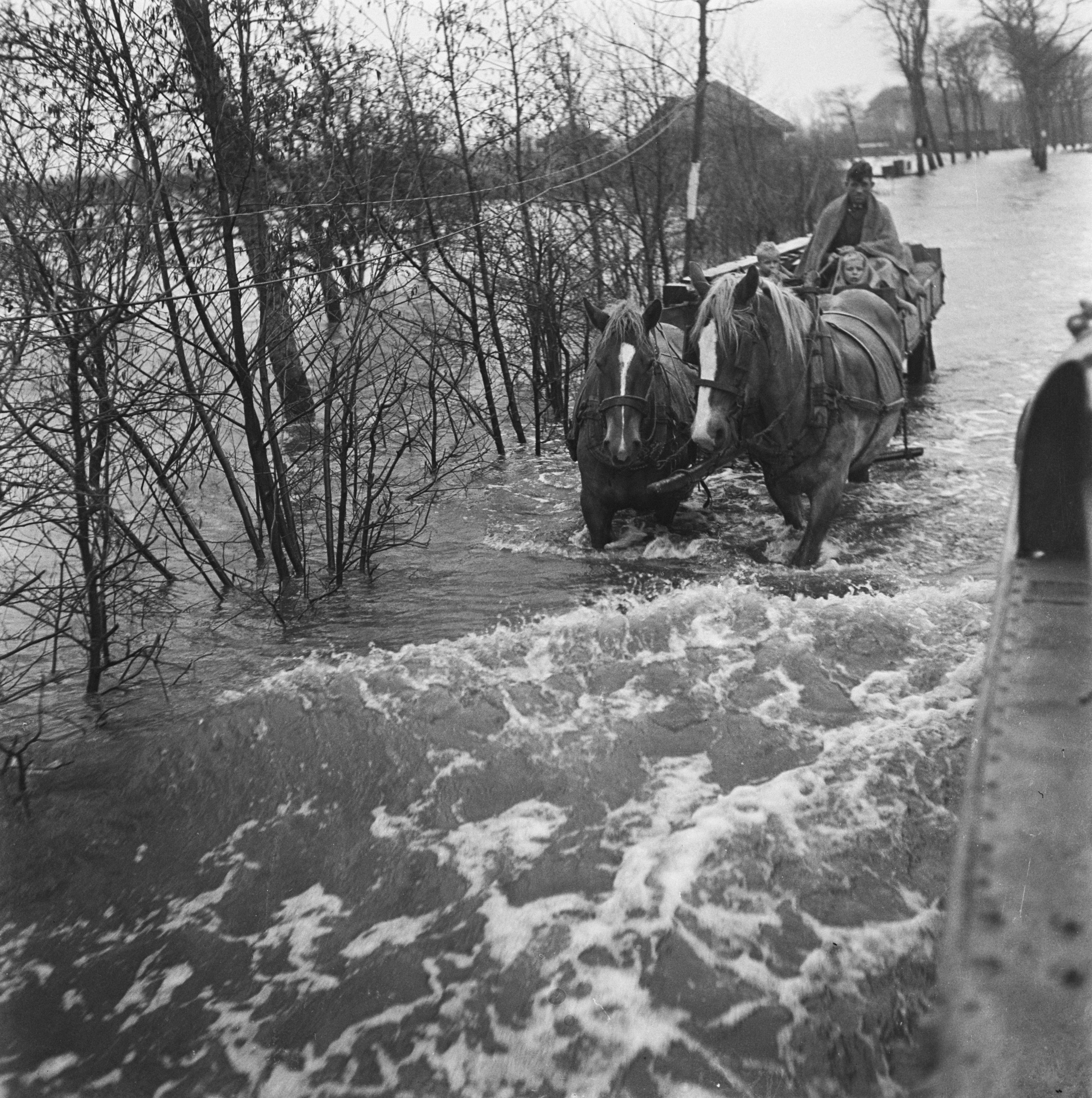
DUKW passing a horsecart.

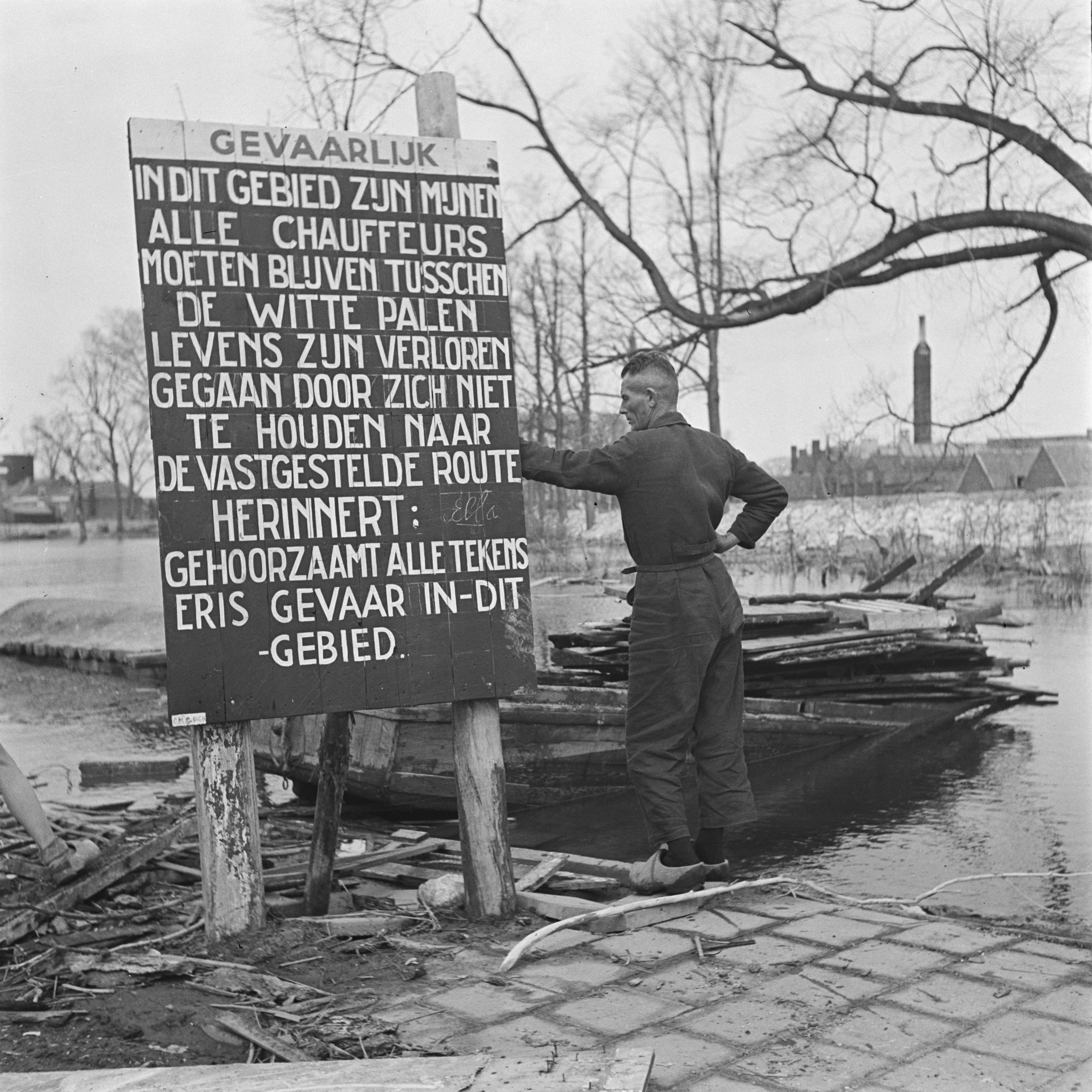
Warning sign for minefield in inundated area.

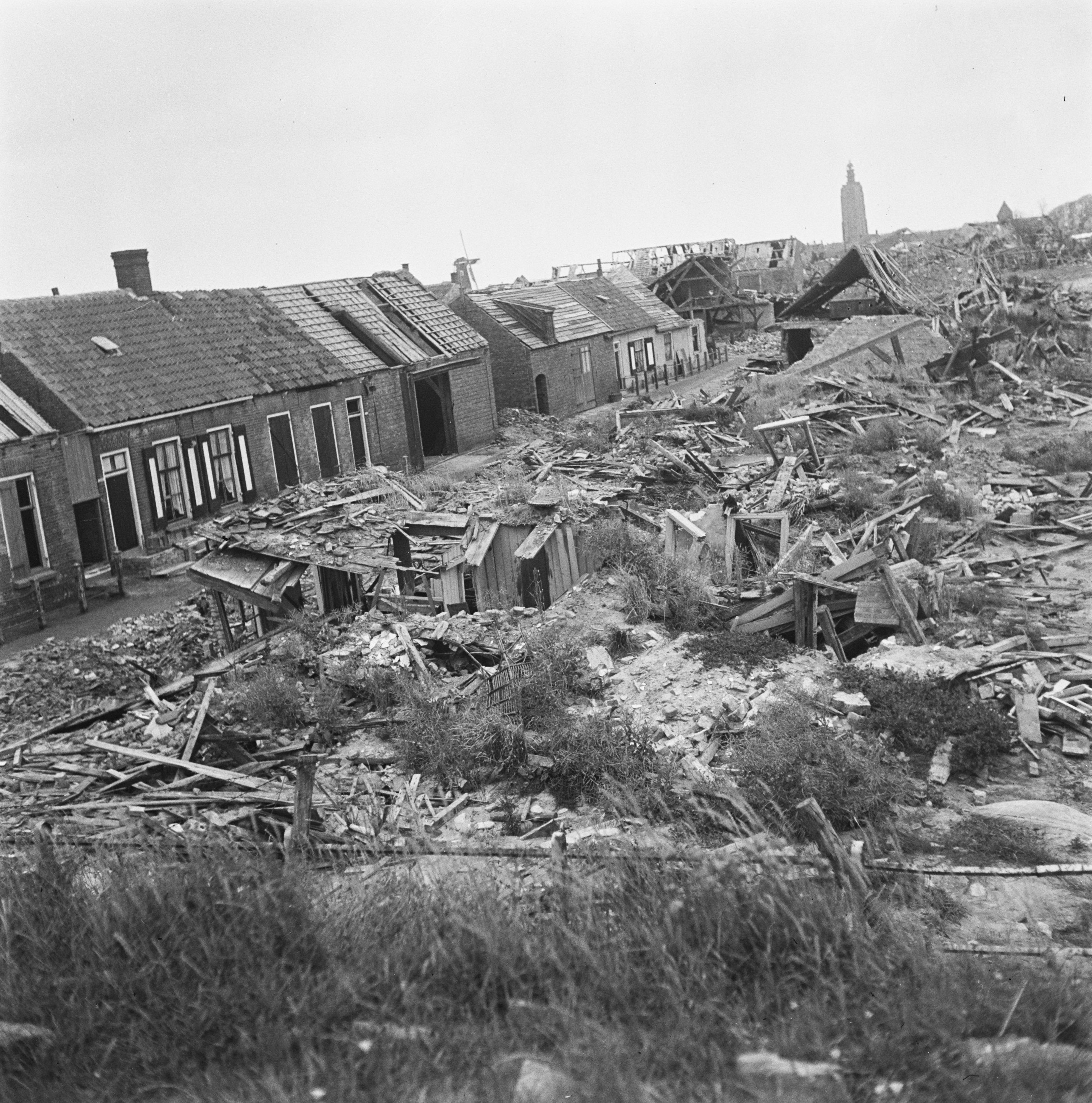
Devastation in Westkapelle after bombardment.

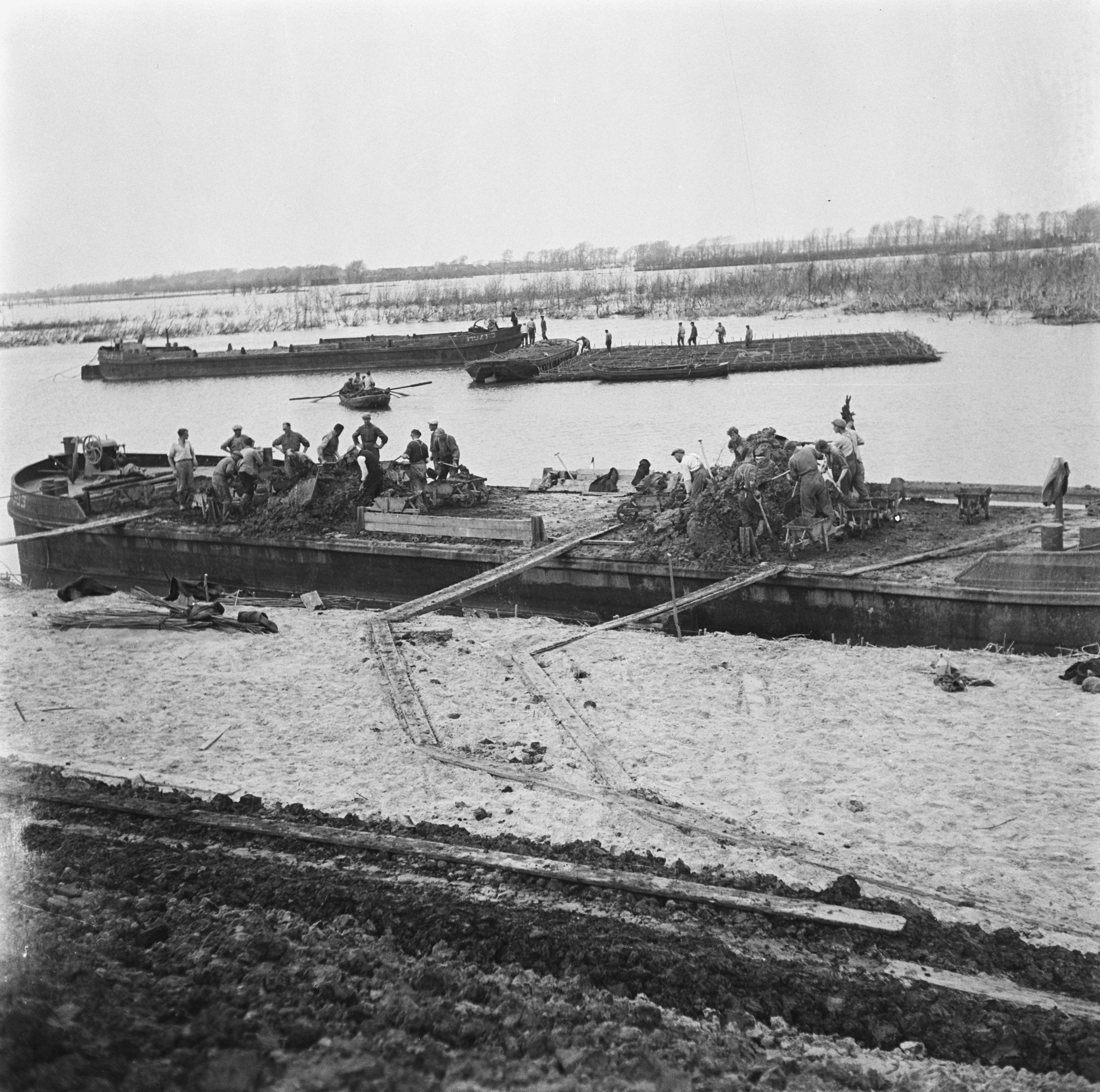
Closing the breach at the Nolledijk in Vlissingen, October 1945

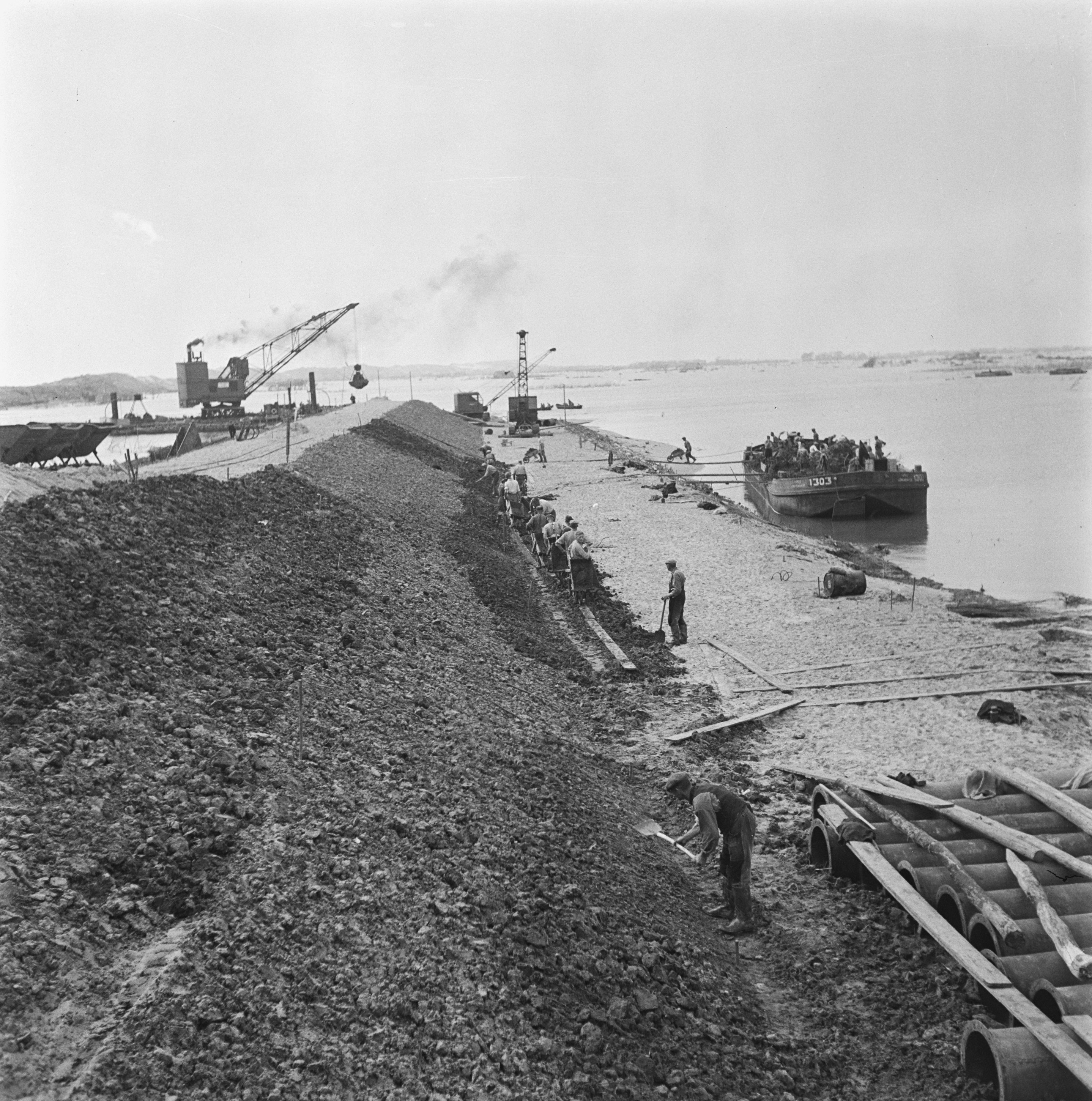
Building a dam in Vlissingen

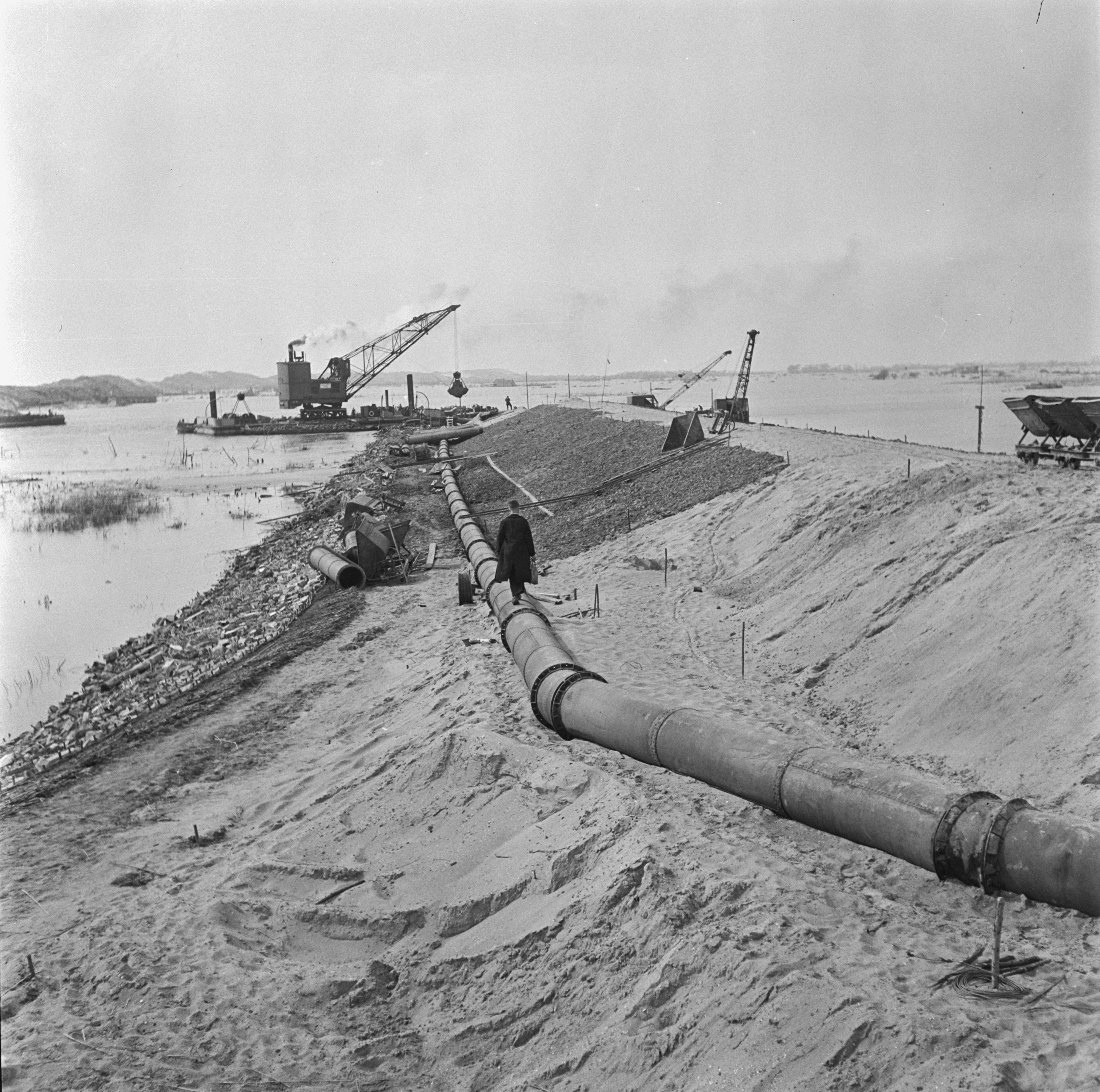
Rebuilding the dike in Vlissingen. The pipeline transports a sand-water slurry.

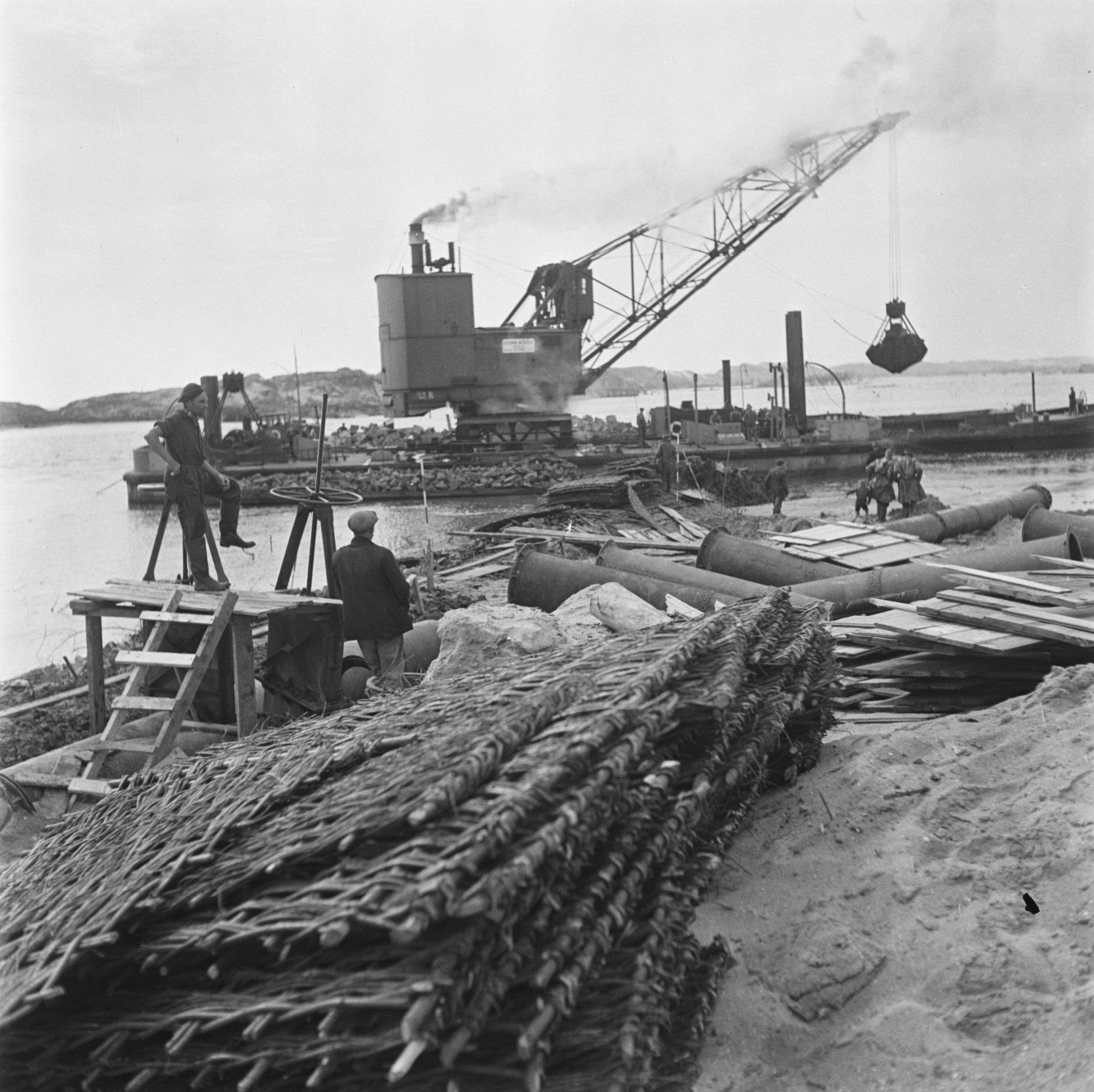
A floating steam derrick at the closing of the Nolledijk breach in Vlissingen. A brushwood fascine in the foreground

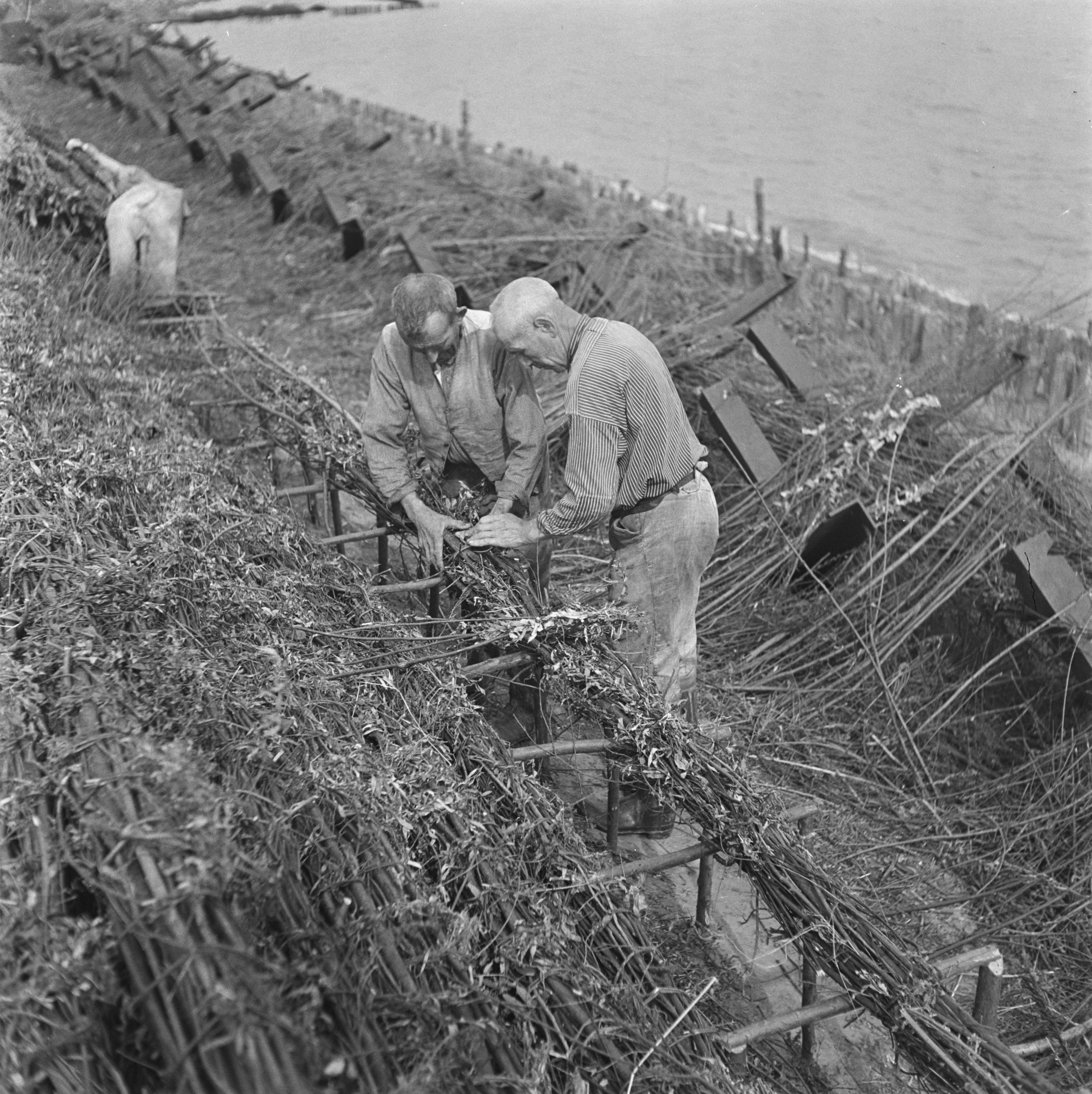
Laborers preparing a brushwood fascine; in the background obstacles for landingcraft as part of the Atlantic Wall.

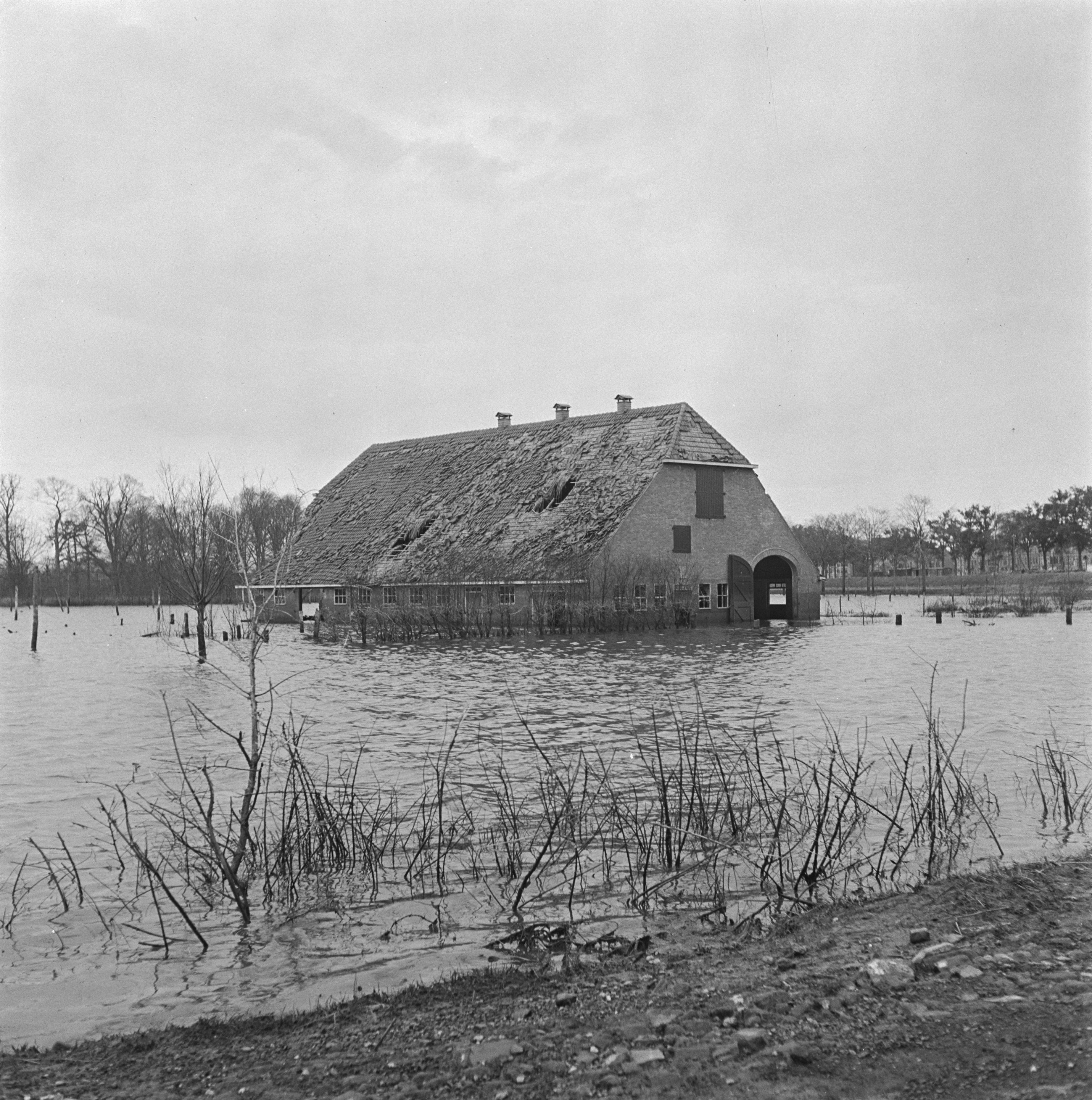
Submerged barn

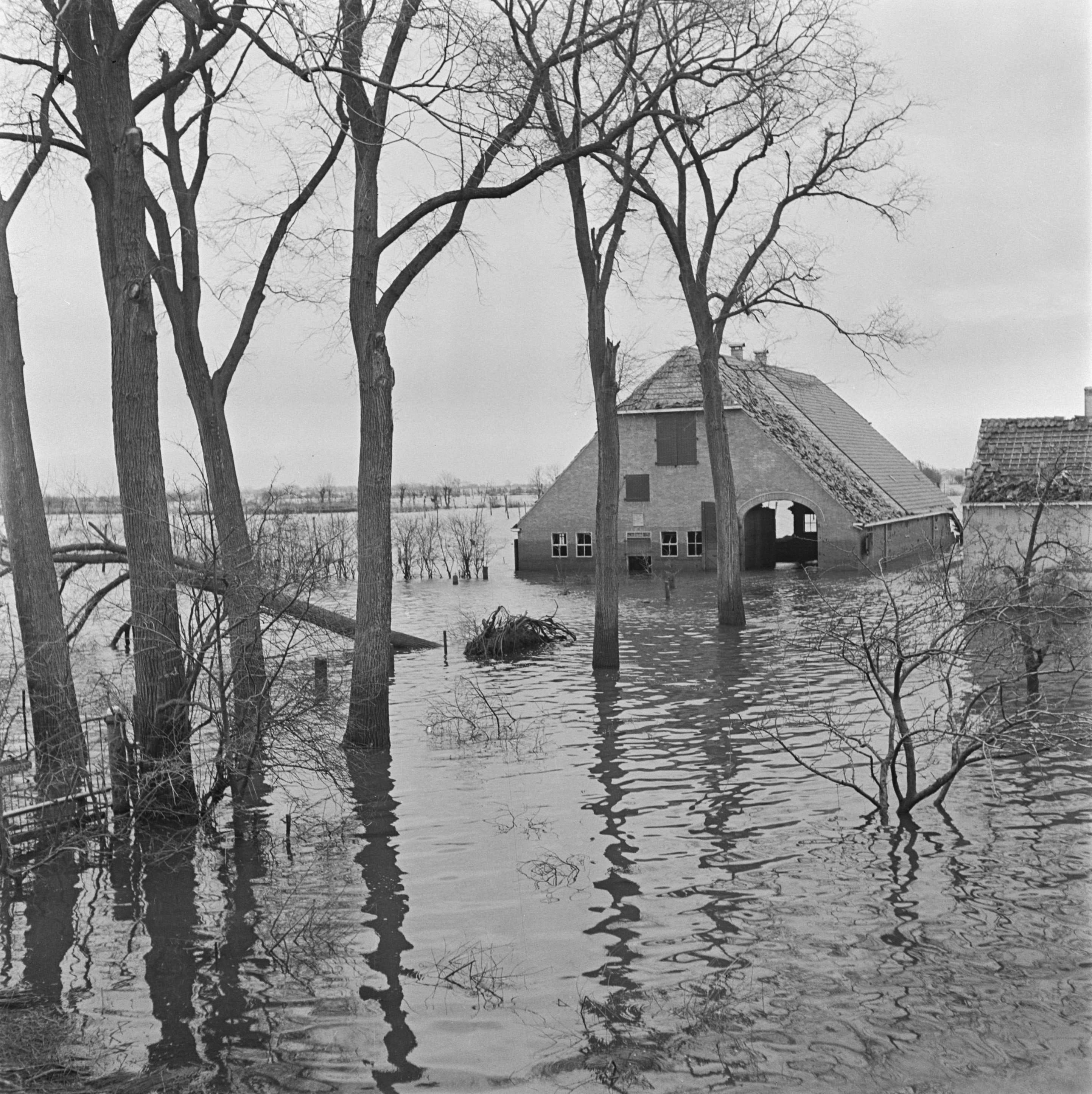
Submerged farmhouse

== See also ==
- Inundation of the Wieringermeer

== Sources ==
- Bollen, H. and J. Kuiper-Abee (1985). Worsteling om Walcheren (in Dutch). Uitgeverij Terra-Zutphen. ISBN 90-6255-228-5.
- Copp, T. (2007). Cinderella Army: The Canadians In Northwest Europe, 1944-1945.
- Gent, T. van (2005). The Allied Assault on Walcheren, 1944 in: C. Steenman-Markusse, and A. van Herk (eds.), Building Liberty: Canada and World Peace, 1945-2005. Barkhuis. pp. 11–30. ISBN 9789077922057.
- Goodlet, K.W. (2013). " "Reduced to the banks of mud from which they were reclaimed": The province of Zeeland, war and reconstruction, 1940-1945, in: Can. J. of Netherlandic Studies/Rev. can. d'études néerlandaises 34.2" (PDF). Canadian Association for the Advancement of Netherlandic Studies/Association canadienne pour l'avancement des études néerlandaises. pp. 29–56.
- Klep, C. and B. Schoenmaker (1995). De bevrijding van Nederland. Oorlog op de flank 1944-1945 (in Dutch). Den Haag: Sdu. ISBN 90-12-08191-2.
- "Zeeland". Tweede Wereldoorlog. Een portal over de Tweede Wereldoorlog met lesmateriaal, bronnen, digitale tentoonstellingen en activiteiten in het land. (in Dutch).
