= Inundation of the Wieringermeer =

Coordinates: 52.890°N 5.076°E

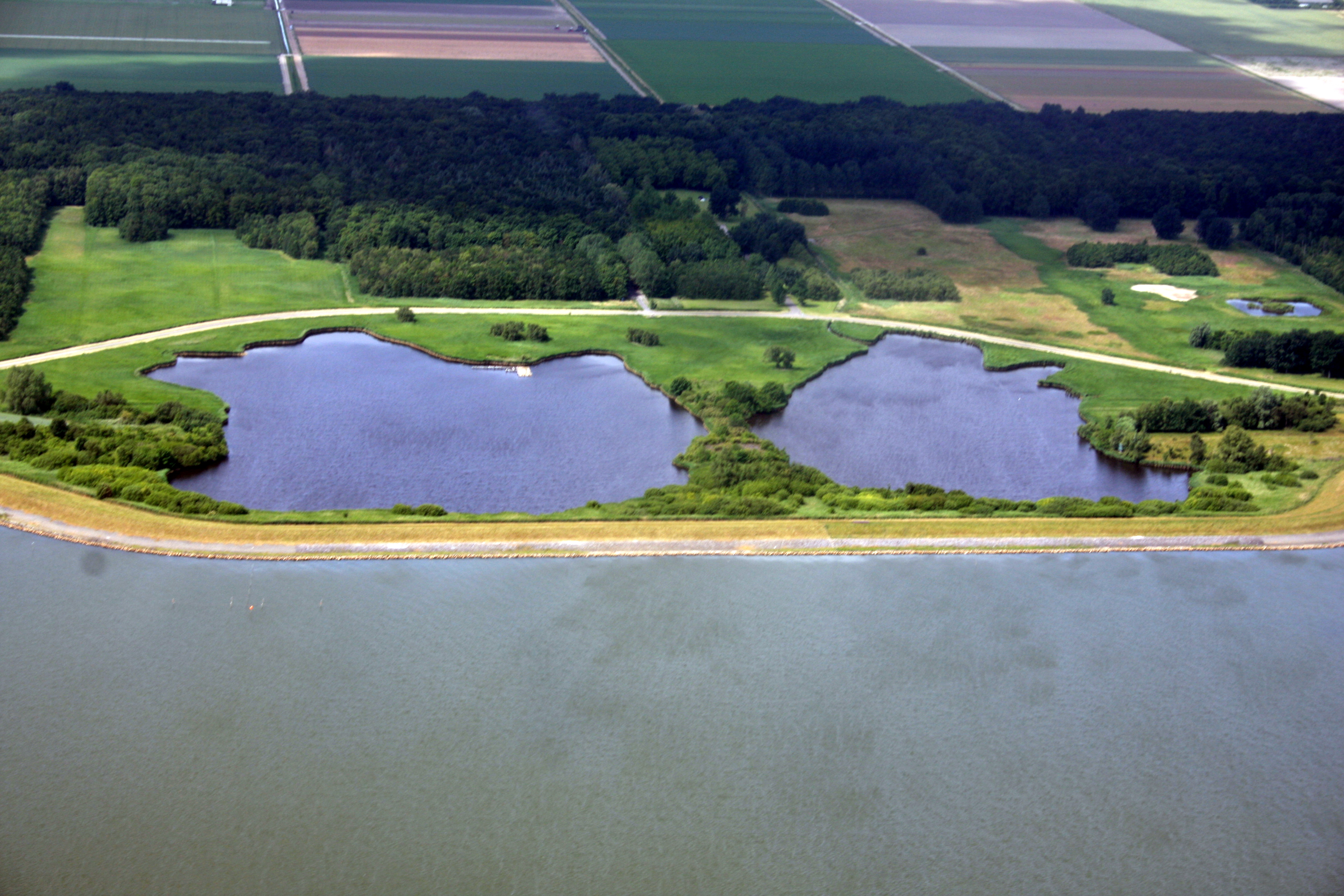
Position where the dike burst took place

On 17 April 1945, the retreating German occupying forces inundated the polder of Wieringermeer, the Netherlands.

== Preparations ==
In 1945 German forces occupying the Netherlands planned to destroy the Zuiderzee Works to cover their retreat. Military reasons for this are still unclear, but it may have been done to deny the Allies a landing area for airborne troops or gliders. In preparation for this flooding, the water level of the IJsselmeer was deliberately raised. The level in the IJsselmeer was 3.62 m (12 ft) above the ground level of Wieringerpolder at the site of the breach, and varied between 3.12–5.12 metres (10–17 ft) above, across the polder. Inundation had already been used on some Dutch polders but this strategic inundation was shallow and was done by stopping the drainage pumping or allowing water to flow backwards through the pumping stations to give a shallow flooding. The rapid and deep tactical inundation planned for the Wieringerpolder, done by the destruction of a dyke, was new. It was known that even an explosive breach would not be enough, and it would be the enlargement of the breach by the water itself which would cause the most damage.

In late February or early March 1945 Dutch workers started to undermine the dike around the polder under German command. The location is near the farm of Beetstra, in the dike with the IJsselmeer. Deep holes were dug in the dike both at the bottom and at the top of the dike. In these holes explosives would be put. The work was progressing slowly since none of the workers were motivated. In April, the work came to a complete stop.

On April 10, German officers came and inspected the work. New workers were sought and 25 to 50 people were taken from Schagen during a razzia to work on the digging. After a week, the holes were deep enough and explosives were installed. Each hole was loaded with 1,000 kg (2,200 lb) of explosives; unexploded bombs from British and American aircraft were used.

== Flooding ==
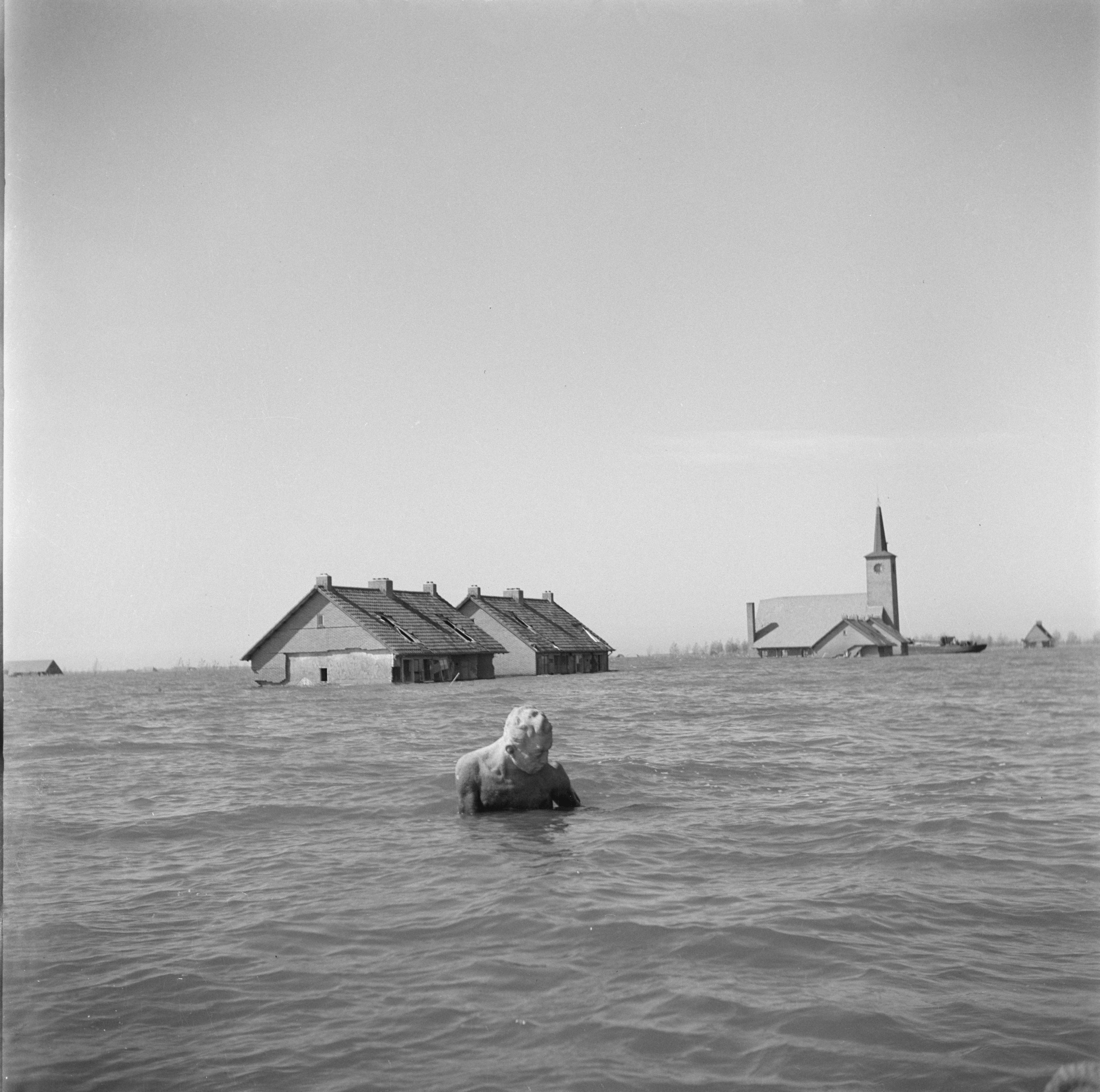
Effect of the flooding on the Wieringermeer. The breach was closed by December 1945. The figure in the foreground is a statue called De Maaier (The Mower) which still stands in the town square of Wieringerwerf.

On 17 April at 12.15 am, the explosives were detonated. The 7,000 people in the Wieringermeer and an estimated 1,000 to 2,000 refugees had to leave the polder. Within 48 hours, the entire polder was full with water, with an average depth of 3.75 m (12 ft)

The initial breaches were small, about 20 m (66 ft) wide and only 1 m (3 ft 3 in) below water level. These increased over the following hours until two huge pits were scoured out, the northern one 160 m (525 ft) wide and 23.5 m (77 ft) deep and the southern hole 200 m (656 ft) wide and 30 m (98 ft) deep.

No one was killed as the polder slowly submerged again (the inhabitants had been warned), but the high water and a subsequent storm destroyed most of the infrastructure built in the previous decade. Buildings were not generally badly damaged by the flooding, but by the storms later.

As civilians left the flooding polder through the military checkpoints, the Resistance member A.C. de Graaf, of Wieringermeer, was captured and then shot whilst trying to escape.

== Reconstruction ==
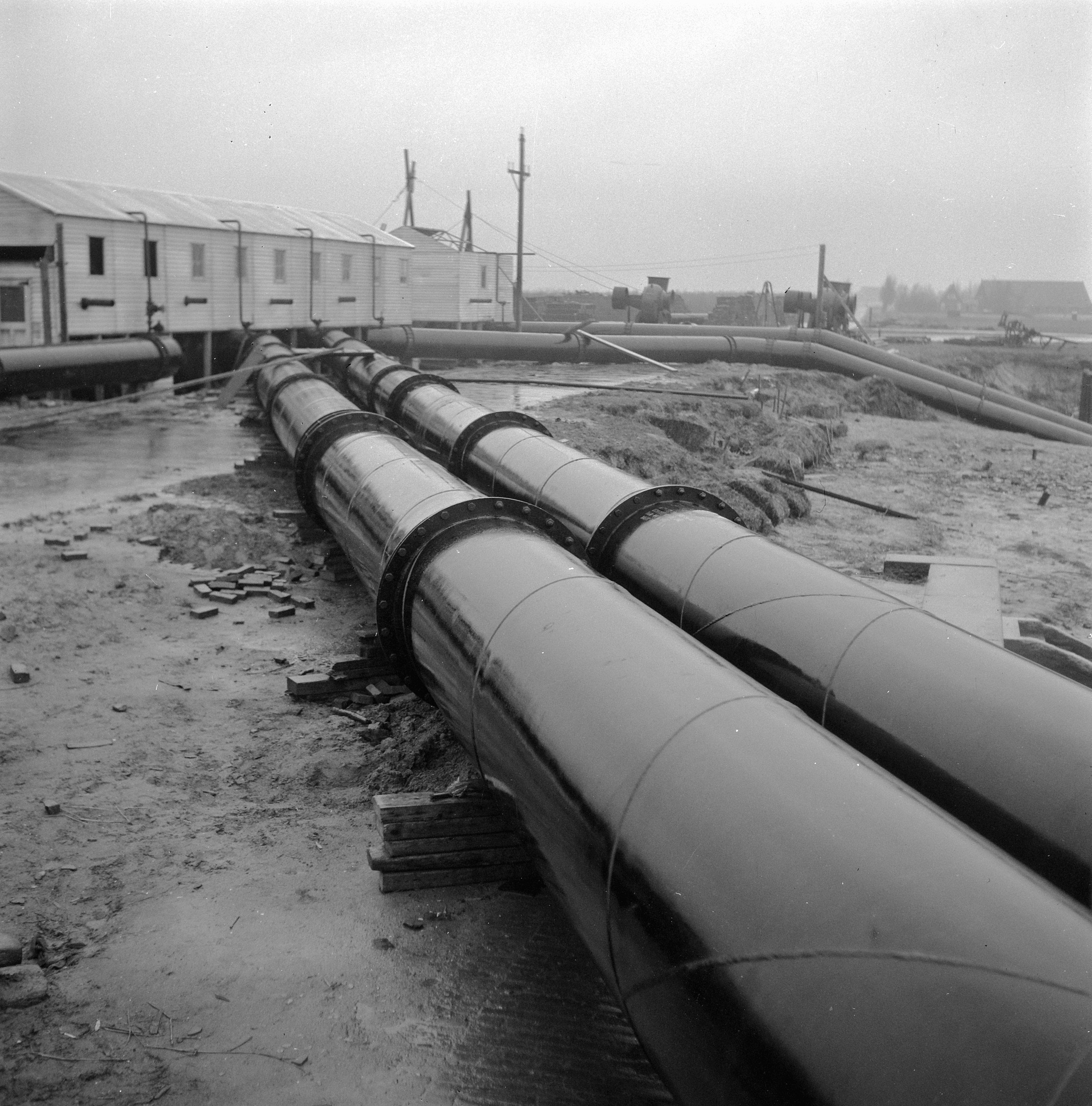
Pumping station at Medemblik in December 1945

Reconstruction followed quickly after the German retreat; by the end of 1945, the polder was declared drained again. The floodwater was fresh water, so the land did not have to be desalinated again. Rebuilding of roads and bridges, houses and farms, was greatly facilitated by the experience of building them the first time. Some building materials were re-used: three million roof tiles were salvaged, many by removing them from the roofs of flooded buildings, also lightening the load on their weakened structures.

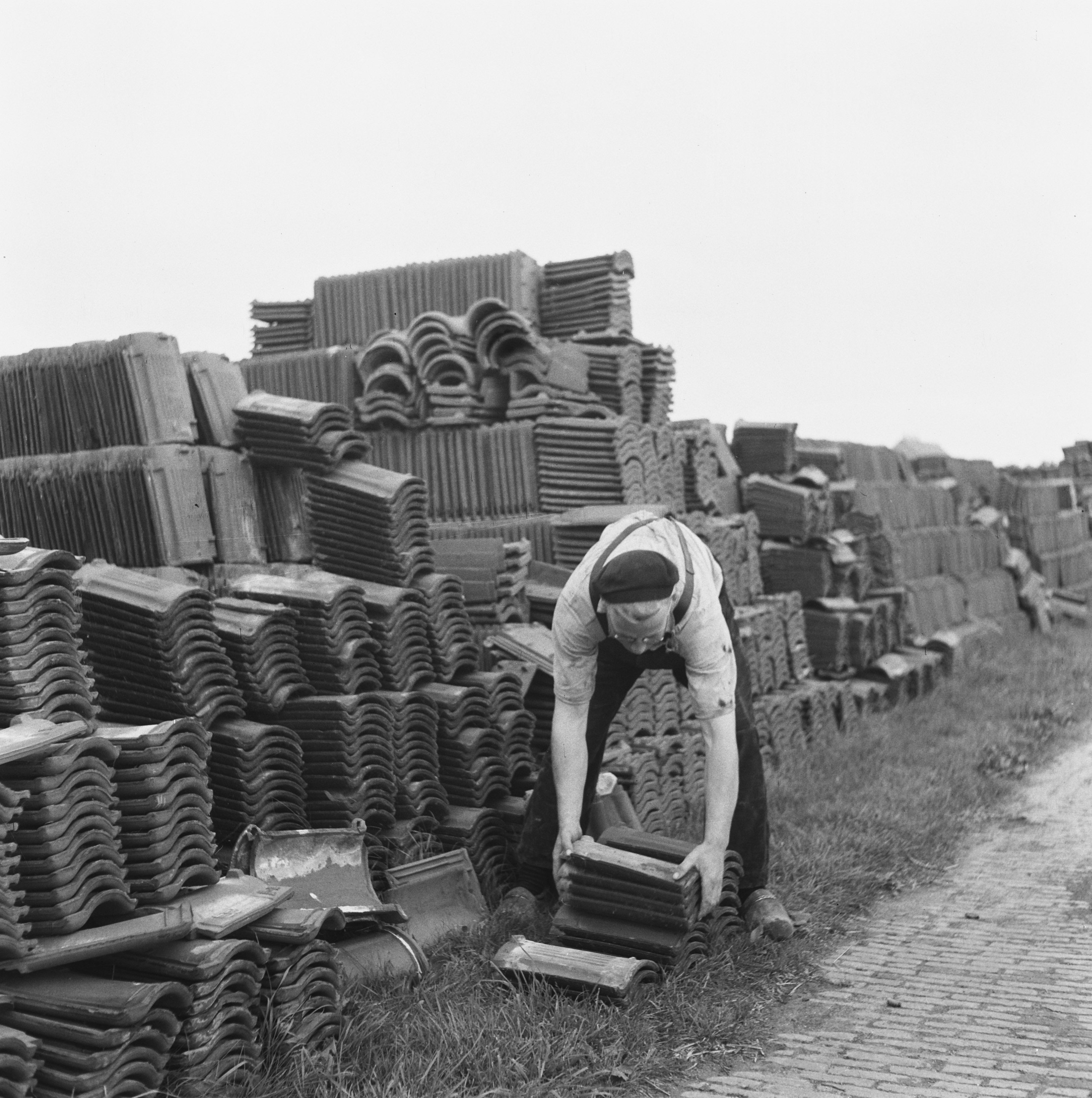
Recovering roof tiles during the reconstruction

The pits remain today, with areas of 3.7 ha (9.1 acres) and 5.4 ha (13 acres). Owing to their size and the infill needed, the dyke was not restored to its original line, passing through where the two flooded pits are, but now went outside this by 144 m (472 ft) and with the perimeter road inside them. The replacement dyke was also built to a simpler standard than the original: when first built, this had been a sea dyke protecting from the sea of the Zuider Zee. After the construction of the Afsluitdijk, this was now just the calmer water of the IJsselmeer.

== See also ==
- Inundation of Walcheren

== Sources ==
- J. J. Bosman and P. C. Bosman, De polder onder water, het verslag van de onderwaterzetting van de Wieringermeerpolder in 1945, Free Media, 1995
- Hoes, Olivier (2011). "Inundatie van de Wieringermeer in april 1945" [Inundation of the Wieringermeer in April 1945, Reconstruction of the dyke breach and flooding] (PDF). Tijdschrift voor Waterstaatsgeschiedenis [Magazine for water management history] (in Dutch) (20).
