= Wieringerwerf =

- Town
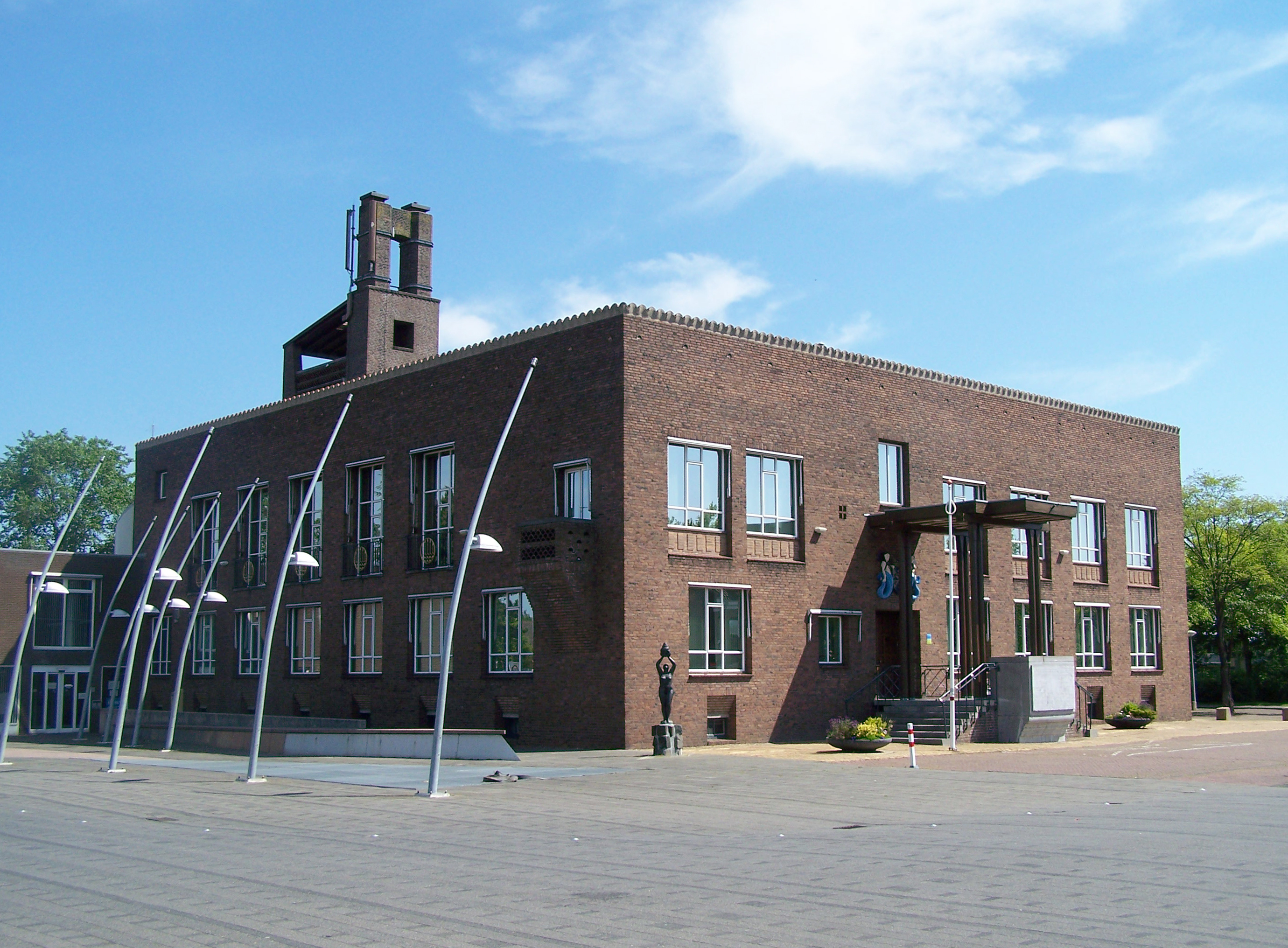
- Former town hall

- Location in the Netherlands Location in the province of North Holland in the Netherlands
- Coordinates: 52°51′2″N 5°1′22″E
- Country: Netherlands
- Province: North Holland
- Municipality: Hollands Kroon

Area
  - Town: 69.46 km^{2} (26.82 sq mi)
- Elevation: −4.1 m (−13 ft)

Population (2025)
  - Town: 6,150
  - Density: 88.5/km^{2} (229/sq mi)
  - Urban: 5,435
  - Rural: 715
- Time zone: UTC+1 (CET)
  - Summer (DST): UTC+2 (CEST)
- Postal code: 1771
- Dialing code: 0227

Wieringerwerf is a town in the Dutch province of North Holland. It is a part of the municipality of Hollands Kroon, and lies about 21 kilometres (13 mi) southeast of Den Helder. It is situated in a polder. The elevation of the village is 4 metres (13 ft) below sea level. Dikes and pumping engines keep the land dry.

== History ==
In 1936 the construction of the village began, a few years after the reclamation of the polder. Because of an employment project that was subsidised by the state, inhabitants from all over the country came to the Wieringermeer to help build an infrastructure. In only short time houses, shops, churches and schools rose in Wieringerwerf. Near the town a "terp" was built, an artificial hill that could serve as a refuge in case of an eventual bursting of the IJsselmeer dike.

On 1 July 1941 Wieringermeer became an independent municipality. On 29 September of the same year, the first inhabitants of the new land gave a memorial to the new mayor and aldermen. This statue, entitled De Maaier (The Mower), can be found on a square in the town centre. The inscription says: "Here a future was built, keep building."

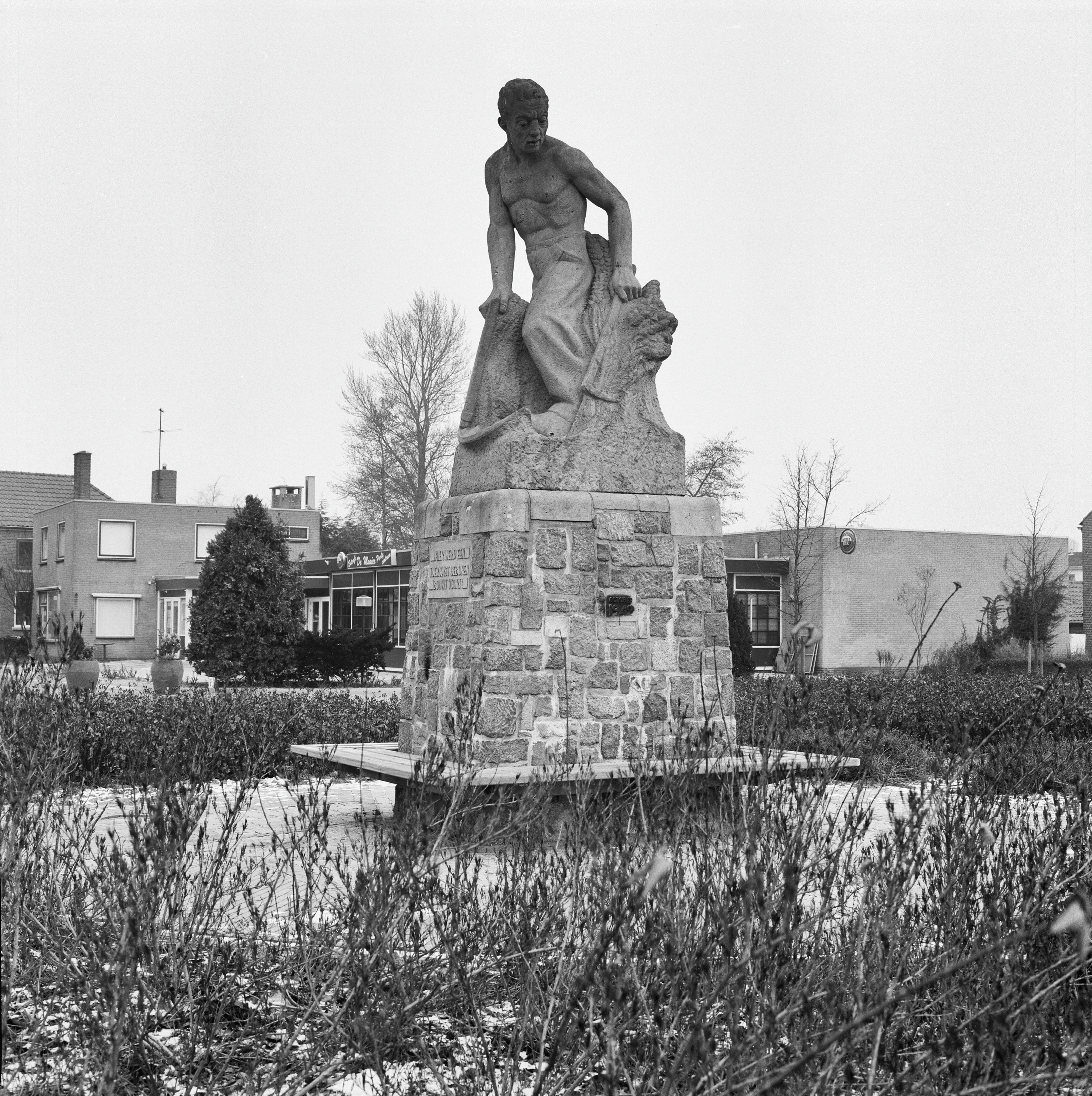
De Maaier (The Mower). When the dam that held back the waters of the IJsselmeer was breached in 1945, the water came up to the figure's shoulders.

On 17 April 1945 the Germans bombed the dike and within two days the complete polder was all water again (see also inundation of the Wieringermeer). Most inhabitants fled inland to higher ground, but a few found their refuge on the man-made terp. On 11 December 1945 the polder was reclaimed again, so the building of Wieringerwerf could start for a second time. Nowadays, a monument and a deep pool still mark the location of the bursting.

In the decades after the reconstruction Wieringerwerf always had a growing population. Several quarters were built around the town centre. The town is still growing, so the inscription of the statue De Mower still finds a response.

== Statistics ==
In 2001, the town of Wieringerwerf had 5661 inhabitants. The built-up area of the town was 1.36 square kilometres (0.53 mi^{2}), and contained 2285 residences. The wider statistical area of Wieringerwerf has a population of around 5700.
