= Ritthem =

- Village
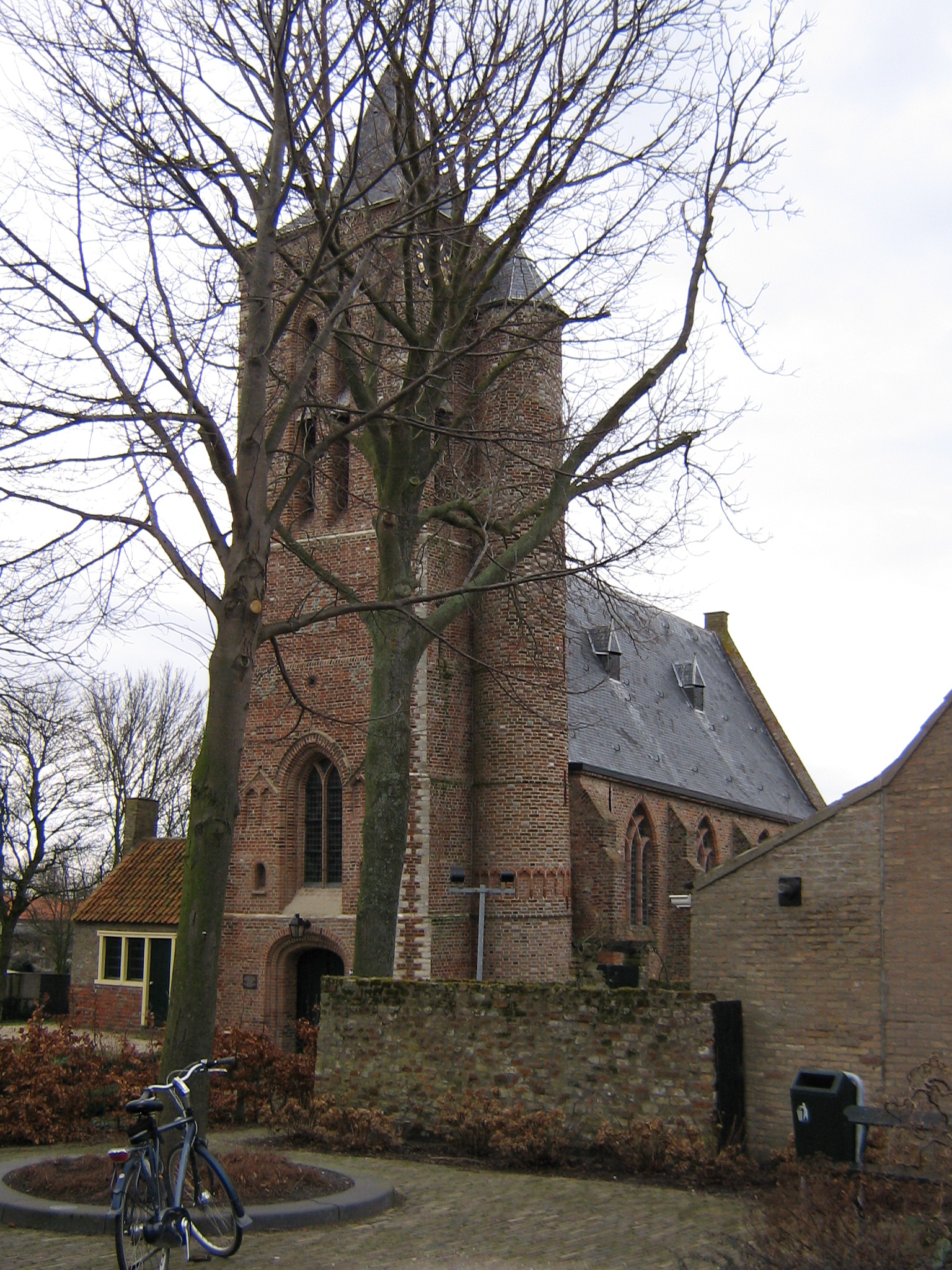
- Church of Ritthem

- Coat of arms

- Location in the province of Zeeland in the Netherlands Ritthem (Netherlands)
- Coordinates: 51°27′5″N 3°37′34″E
- Country: Netherlands
- Province: Zeeland
- Municipality: Vlissingen

Area
  - Total: 0.31 km^{2} (0.12 sq mi)
- Elevation: 5.0 m (16.4 ft)

Population (2021)
  - Total: 385
  - Density: 1,200/km^{2} (3,200/sq mi)
- Time zone: UTC+1 (CET)
  - Summer (DST): UTC+2 (CEST)
- Postal code: 4389
- Dialing code: 0118

Ritthem is a village in the Dutch province of Zeeland. It is located in the municipality of Vlissingen, about 4 kilometres east of the city.

== History ==
The village was first mentioned in 1235 as Rithem, and means "settlement near reed". Ritthem is an incomplete circular church village which developed in the Middle Ages on a ridge.

The Dutch Reformed church is a single aisled church with a leaning tower from the 14th century. The 16th century nave was damaged in 1572 during the Dutch Revolt and rebuilt in 1611 without a choir.

Ritthem was home to 362 people in 1840. Ritthem was a separate municipality until 1966, when it was merged with Vlissingen.

== Fort Rammekens ==
Fort Rammekens was built between 1547 and 1556 by orders of Mary of Hungary to control the Westerschelde (Antwerp) and the former Sloe (Middelburg). The fort was a near triangular shape. It was modified and extended several times. The last modification was by Napoleon in 1810 who added nine casemates on the seaside. In 1863, it was decommissioned and used as a ammunition depot. During World War II, it was used by the Germans as part of Landfront Vlissingen and the Atlantic Wall. In 1944, the dyke was bombed by the Allies, and filled up with caissons in 1945.

== Gallery ==
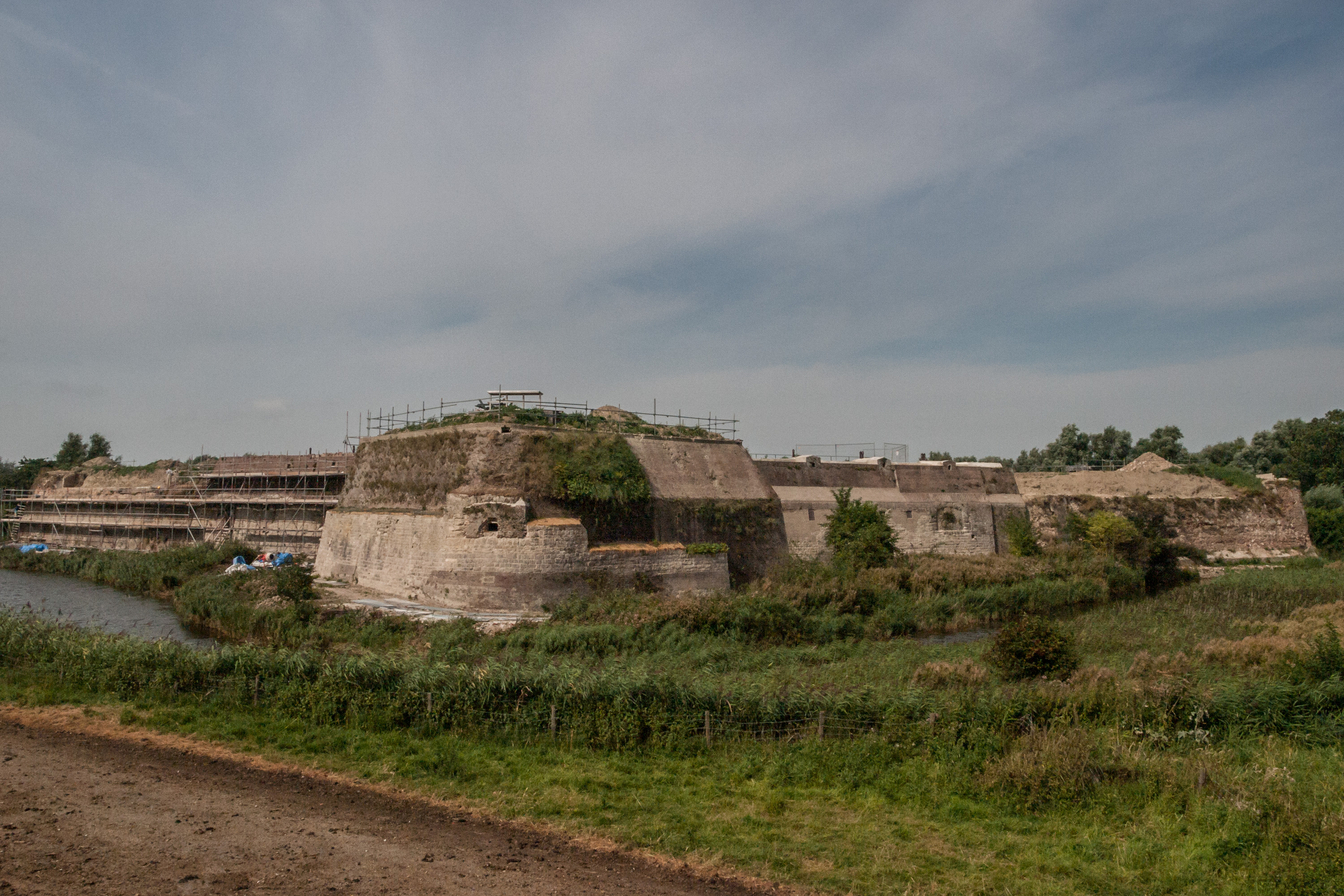
Fort Rammekens

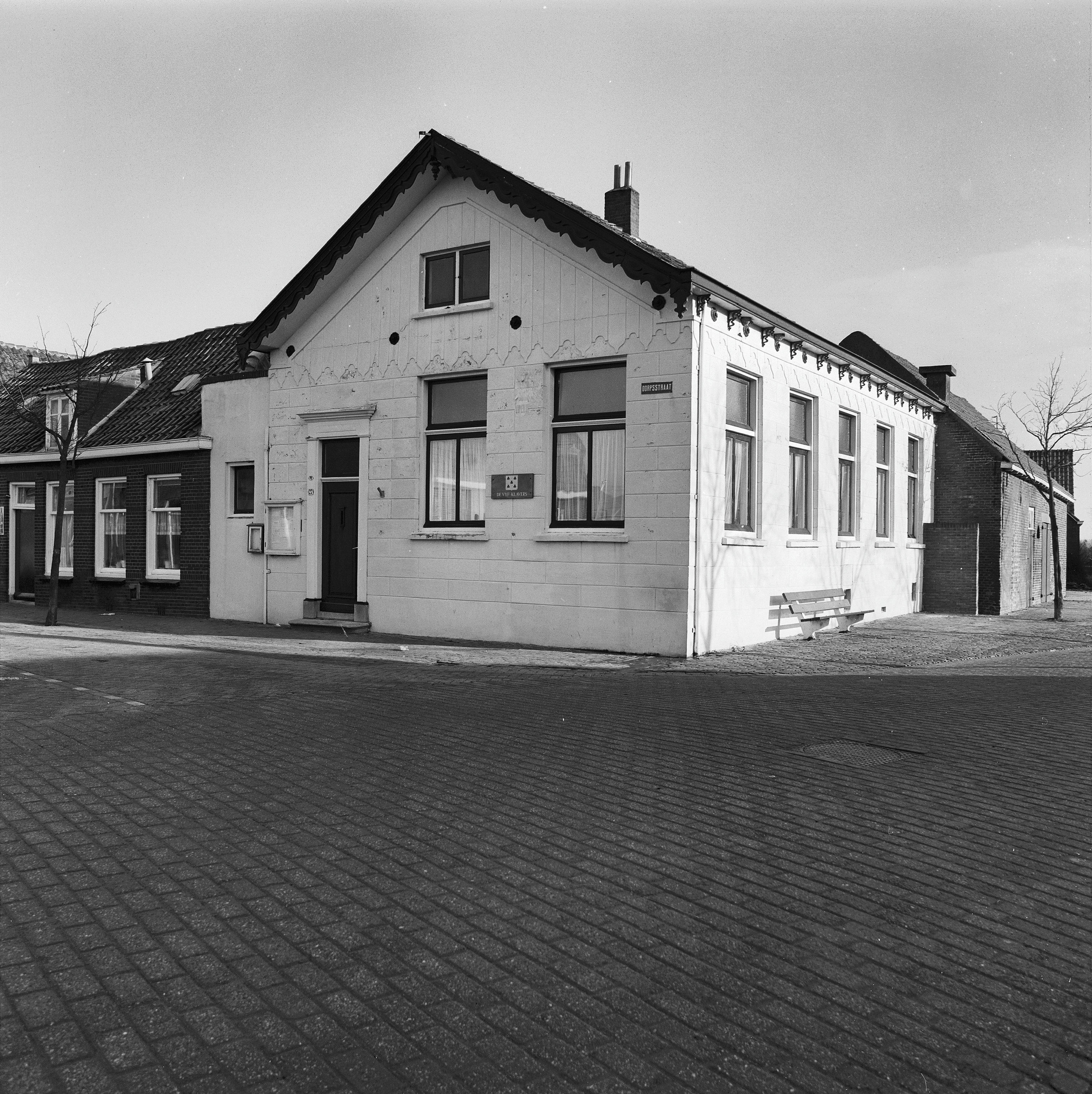
Street view of Ritthem's Dorpsstraat 27.
