= List of shipwrecks in December 1850 =

The list of shipwrecks in December 1850 includes ships sunk, foundered, wrecked, grounded, or otherwise lost during December 1850.

== 1 December ==
List of shipwrecks: December 1850
Ship	State	Description
Cinq Frères	France	The lugger was wrecked on the Marguerites.
Clytha	United Kingdom	The barque was abandoned in the Atlantic Ocean. Her crew were rescued by Renfrewshire (United Kingdom). Clytha was on a voyage from Quebec City, Province of Canada, British North America to Cork. She was taken in to Queenstown, County Cork in a derelict condition on 16 February 1851.
Confidence	United Kingdom	The brig was in collision with USS Constitution (United States Navy) and sank in the Strait of Gibraltar with the loss of her captain. Survivors were rescued by USS Constitution.
Constante	Kingdom of the Two Sicilies	The brig was driven ashore in the Aran Islands, County Galway, United Kingdom. She was on a voyage from Odesa to Limerick, United Kingdom. She was refloated and towed in to Galway in a leaky condition.
Elizabeth Young	United Kingdom	The ship ran aground in the Cockle Gat, off the coast of Norfolk. She was on a voyage from London to South Shields, County Durham. She was refloated.
Frederic	France	The ship struck Gruen's Rocks, in the Channel Islands, and sank. Her crew were rescued. She was on a voyage from Bayonne, Basses-Pyrénées to Rouen, Seine-Inférieure.
Rosetta Joseph	United Kingdom	The barque was wrecked on a reef in the Pacific Ocean. All on board were rescued. She was on a voyage from San Francisco, California, United States to Sydney, New South Wales.
Two Brothers	United Kingdom	The ship was driven ashore at Dungarvan, County Waterford. She was on a voyage from Cardiff, Glamorgan to Cork. She was refloated on 5 December.

== 2 December ==
List of shipwrecks: 2 December 1850
Ship	State	Description
Belfast	(United Kingdom of Great Britain and Ireland) Bermuda	The brigantine was driven ashore and wrecked in Savannes Bay, Saint Lucia. Her crew were rescued. She was on a voyage from New York, United States to Saint Vincent.
Catharina, and Thomas Ellah	Grand Duchy of Oldenburg; Lübeck	Catharina collided with Thomas Ellah and foundered off Bolderāja, Russia. Her crew were rescued by Thomas Ellah, which put in to Bolderāja in a sinking condition.
Falcone	Austrian Empire	The brig capsized at Cardiff, Glamorgan, United Kingdom and was severely damaged.
Lord Lambton	United Kingdom	The brig ran aground on the Corton Sand, in the North Sea off the coast of Suffolk. She was on a voyage from London to South Shields, County Durham and/or Newcastle upon Tyne, Northumberland. She was refloated and resumed her voyage.
William	United Kingdom	The schooner was wrecked at Strangford, County Antrim. Her crew were rescued. She was on a voyage from Liverpool, Lancashire to London.
Young Henry	(United Kingdom of Great Britain and Ireland) British North America	The schooner was wrecked at St. Peter's, Nova Scotia.

== 3 December ==
List of shipwrecks: December 1850
Ship	State	Description
Epervier	France	The ship was driven ashore on Ameland, Friesland, Netherlands. Her crew survived. She was on a voyage from Stockholm, Sweden to Saint-Malo, Ille-et-Vilaine.
Isabella	United Kingdom	The ship was driven ashore 2 nautical miles (3.7 km) west of Fraserburgh, Aberdeenshire. She was on a voyage from Inverness to Newcastle upon Tyne, Northumberland. She was refloated and put in to Fraserburgh for repairs.
Jeune Arnandel	France	The ship was driven ashore at the Pointe de Grave, Gironde. she was on a voyage from Bordeaux, Gironde to Nantes, Loire-Inférieure.
Mitton Hill	United Kingdom	The ship was driven ashore at Redcar, Yorkshire. She was on a voyage from King's Lynn, Norfolk to Hartlepool, County Durham. She was refloated and resumed her voyage.
Orion	United Kingdom	The ship was driven ashore and severely damaged at Flamborough Head, Yorkshire. She was on a voyage from South Shields, County Durham to Venice, Kingdom of Lombardy–Venetia.
Sarah Jane	United Kingdom	The ship was driven ashore at Wexford. She was on a voyage from Liverpool, Lancashire to Dungarvan, County Waterford. She was later refloated and completed her voyage
Speedy Packet	United Kingdom	The ship was run down and sunk by Cornelia (United Kingdom) with the loss of five of her seven crew. She was on a voyage from Liverpool to Malta.

== 4 December ==
List of shipwrecks: 4 December 1850
Ship	State	Description
Merovee	Flag unknown	The ship was driven ashore south of Donna Nook, Lincolnshire, United Kingdom.
La Meuse	France	The ship was driven ashore and wrecked at Genver, Cornwall, United Kingdom with the loss of one life. She was on a voyage from Calcutta, India to Havre de Grâce, Seine-Inférieure.
Mountaineer	United Kingdom	The ship struck the pier at Whitby, Yorkshire and was damaged. She was on a voyage from Quebec City, Province of Canada, British North America to Whitby.
Victoria	United Kingdom	The ship ran aground at Poole, Dorset. She was on a voyage from Quebec City to Poole. She was refloated and towed in to Poole.
William	United Kingdom	The ship was driven ashore and wrecked near Belfast, County Antrim. She was on a voyage from Liverpool, Lancashire to Londonderry.

== 5 December ==
List of shipwrecks: 5 December 1850
Ship	State	Description
Amelia	Prussia	The full-rigged ship ran aground on the Goodwin Sands, Kent, United Kingdom. She was on a voyage from Cardiff, Glamorgan, United Kingdom to Danzig. She was refloated and resumed her voyage.
Eleanor	United Kingdom	The ship capsized and sank during a squall in the Irish Sea off St. Bees Head, Cumberland. Her crew were rescued. She was on a voyage from Dublin to Whitehaven, Cumberland.
Enterprise	United Kingdom	The ship struck a sunken rock and sank at Stornoway, Isle of Lewis, Outer Hebrides with the loss of one life. She was on a voyage from Ullapool, Ross-shire to Stornoway. She was refloated on 1 October 1851 and taken in to Stornoway.
Maria	United Kingdom	The ship ran aground on the Whitby Rock. She was refloated and resumed her voyage.
Minerva	United Kingdom	The ship was driven ashore at Whitby, Yorkshire. She was refloated.
Orion	United Kingdom	The ship was driven ashore at Flamborough Head, Yorkshire. She was refloated and taken in to Bridlington, Yorkshire. She departed under tow for Hull on 13 December.

== 6 December ==
List of shipwrecks: 6 December 1850
Ship	State	Description
Eldorado	(United Kingdom of Great Britain and Ireland) British North America	The ship ran aground and sank at Saint John, New Brunswick. She was on a voyage from Saint John to Liverpool, Lancashire. She was refloated and put back to Saint John, where she was repaired.
Emma Sherratt	(United Kingdom of Great Britain and Ireland) South Australia	The ship was wrecked on Turtle Island. Her crew were rescued. She was on a voyage from San Francisco, California, United States to Adelaide.
Susan	United Kingdom	The ship ran aground and was damaged in the River Avon. She was on a voyage from Demerara, British Guiana to Bristol, Gloucestershire. She was refloated and taken in to Bristol.
Vrienden	Netherlands	The ship ran aground at Newport, Monmouthshire, United Kingdom. She was on a voyage from Rotterdam, South Holland to Manila, Spanish East Indies.
William Lord	United States	The ship departed from Savannah, Georgia for Liverpool, Lancashire, United Kingdom. No further trace, presumed foundered with the loss of all hands.
Wisthal	United Kingdom	The sloop was driven ashore at Penzance, Cornwall.

== 7 December ==
List of shipwrecks: 7 December 1850
Ship	State	Description
Ariel	United Kingdom	The schooner was wrecked on the Bondicar Rocks, on the coast of Northumberland. She was on a voyage from Dunkirk, Nord, France to Leith, Lothian.
Etje Mabia	Netherlands	The ship was driven ashore at Prerow, Prussia. Her crew were rescued. She was on a voyage from Danzig to Amsterdam, North Holland.
Industry	United Kingdom	The ship was driven ashore at Flamborough Head, Yorkshire. She was refloated and resumed her voyage.
Jessie	United Kingdom	The ship was driven ashore at Gilleleje, Denmark. She was on a voyage from Køge, Denmark to Leith, Lothian. She was refloated and taken in to Helsingør, Denmark.
Oriental	United States	The schooner was lost off Fast Point, Prince Edward Island, British North America. Her crew were rescued.
Providence	United Kingdom	The ship ran aground on the Brest Rock, off the coast of Ayrshire. She was refloated and taken in to Ayr.
Sally	United Kingdom	The ship was driven ashore at Killiness Point, Wigtownshire. Her crew were rescued. She was on a voyage from Liverpool, Lancashire to Newcastle upon Tyne, Northumberland.

== 8 December ==
List of shipwrecks: 8 December 1850
Ship	State	Description
Ariel	United Kingdom	The schooner was wrecked on the Bondicar Rocks, on the coast of Northumberland. She was on a voyage from Dunkirk, Nord to Leith, Lothian.
Fear-Not	United Kingdom	The ship was driven ashore at Redcar, Yorkshire. She was on a voyage from Maldon, Essex to Middlesbrough, Yorkshire. She was refloated on 9 December and resumed her voyage.
Golden Grove	(United Kingdom of Great Britain and Ireland) British North America	The ship was wrecked on a reef north of Grand Bahama, Bahamas. Her crew were rescued. She was on a voyage from Saint John's, Newfoundland to Havana, Cuba.
Humayoon	United Kingdom	The full-rigged ship was destroyed by fire in position (54°58′S 74°30′W), in the Pacific Ocean, 65 nautical miles (120 km) off Noir Island, Chile. Her crew were rescued by Symmetry (United Kingdom).
Lucifer	Bremen	The barque was abandoned in the Atlantic Ocean. Her crew were rescued. She was on a voyage from South Shields, County Durham, United Kingdom to Cartagena, Spain.
Ripley	United Kingdom	The ship was driven ashore west of Wells-next-the-Sea, Norfolk. She was refloated and resumed her voyage.
Tagliaferro	Spain	The ship was abandoned in the Atlantic Ocean. Her crew were rescued. She was on a voyage from New York, United States to Cádiz.
Thetis	United Kingdom	The ship was in collision with Lavinia (United Kingdom) off Pladda and was consequently beached at Kilcreggan, Argyllshire. She was on a voyage from Belfast, County Antrim to Greenock, Renfrewshire. She was later refloated and taken in to Dalmuir, Dunbartonshire.

== 9 December ==
List of shipwrecks: 9 December 1850
Ship	State	Description
Amistad	Spain	The brig was lost off Cubana, Cuba. Her crew were rescued. She was on a voyage from Havana to Campeche, Mexico.
Clio	United Kingdom	The schooner was driven ashore and damaged at Sheringham, Norfolk. She was on a voyage from Stockton-on-Tees, County Durham to London. She was refloated and resumed her voyage in a leaky condition, but consequently put in to Harwich, Essex.
Don	(United Kingdom of Great Britain and Ireland) British North America	The schooner was wrecked at Whitehead, Nova Scotia. Her crew were rescued.
Jacob Perkins	United States	The ship was driven ashore and wrecked on Smith Island, Washington. She was on a voyage from Manila, Spanish East Indies to Boston, Massachusetts.
John Bull	United Kingdom	The ship was abandoned in the Atlantic Ocean. Her crew were rescued by Elizabeth Holderness (United Kingdom). John Bull was on a voyage from Quebec City, Province of Canada, British North America to Plymouth, Devon. Her stern came ashore on Bere Island, County Cork on 27 December.
Kalama	Kingdom of Hawaii	The schooner was wrecked on a reef off Honolulu.
West Hoe	United Kingdom	The ship was driven ashore at Penzance, Cornwall. She was on a voyage from Dover, Kent to Penzance. She was refloated the next day.

== 10 December ==
List of shipwrecks: 11 December 1850
Ship	State	Description
Charles Carroll	United States	The ship was abandoned in the Atlantic Ocean. Her crew were rescued by Pacific (flag unknown). Charles Carroll was on a voyage from Liverpool, Lancashire, United Kingdom to Charleston, South Carolina.
James Bryce	United Kingdom	The schooner was wrecked near Balcarry. Her crew were rescued. She was on a voyage from Glasgow, Renfrewshire to Garlieston, Wigtownshire.
Princess Royal	United Kingdom	The ship struck a rock in The Maidens and was holed. She consequently put in to Londonderry. She was on a voyage from Liverpool to Brazil.
Superior	United Kingdom	The ship departed from Marseille, Bouches-du-Rhône, France for Falmouth, Cornwall. No further trace, presumed foundered with the loss of all hand.

== 11 December ==
List of shipwrecks: 11 December 1850
Ship	State	Description
Corinthian Lass	United Kingdom	The ship was driven ashore in the Bosphorus. She had been refloated by 8 January 1851 and subsequently resumed her voyage.
Elizabeth Annett	United Kingdom	The brig ran aground on the Barber Sand, in the North Sea off the coast of Norfolk. She was on a voyage from London to South Shields, County Durham. She was refloated and taken in to Great Yarmouth, Norfolk.
Emma	United Kingdom	The barque was abandoned in the Atlantic Ocean 370 nautical miles (690 km) west of the Isles of Scilly (47°00′N 14°30′W). Her crew were rescued by the brig Caroline (United Kingdom). Emma was on a voyage from North Shields, County Durham to Constantinople, Ottoman Empire.
Montcalm	United Kingdom	The ship was driven ashore on Lady Isle, in the Firth of Clyde. She was refloated and found to be leaky.
Nelly	United Kingdom	The sloop ran aground at Redcar, Yorkshire. She was on a voyage from Sunderland, County Durham to Wisbech, Cambridgeshire. She was refloated and resumed her voyage.
Phœnix	United Kingdom	The ship ran aground on the Kish Bank, in the Irish Sea off the coast of County Dublin and was damaged. She was on a voyage from Liverpool, Lancashire to Maranhão, Brazil. She was refloated and taken in to Dublin in a leaky condition.
Sarah Millidge	United Kingdom	The ship ran aground near Shelburne, Nova Scotia, British North America. She was on a voyage from Liverpool to Halifax, Nova Scotia. She was refloated and put in to Shelburne, where she arrived on 13 December.
Swallow	United Kingdom	The ship was driven ashore west of Newhaven, Sussex. She was on a voyage from Plymouth, Devon to Hull, Yorkshire. She was refloated.

== 12 December ==
List of shipwrecks: 12 December 1850
Ship	State	Description
Damascus	Kingdom of Sardinia	The brig sprang a leak and was beached on Spanish Harbor Key, Florida, United States. Her crew were rescued. She was on a voyage from New Orleans, Louisiana, United States to Genoa.
Emma	United Kingdom	The ship was driven ashore at Flamborough Head, Yorkshire. She was refloated and resumed her voyage.
Jane	United Kingdom	The schooner foundered in the North Sea 5 nautical miles (9.3 km) east by south of Souter Point, Northumberland. Her crew were rescued. She was on a voyage from Newcastle upon Tyne, Northumberland to Southwold, Suffolk.
Jan van Hoorn	United Kingdom	The ship ran aground on the Banjaard Sand, in the North Sea off the coast of Zeeland. She was on a voyage from Batavia, Netherlands East Indies to Rotterdam, South Holland. She was refloated and taken in to Brouwershave, Zeeland.
John and Jane	United Kingdom	The ship was driven ashore at Flamborough Head. She was refloated and resumed her voyage.
John Bryant	United Kingdom	The ship caught fire whilst on a voyage from Savannah, Georgia, United States to Liverpool, Lancashire. She put in to Kingstown, County Dubli and was subsequently taken in tow for Liverpool.
Marie	France	The ship ran aground at Barfleur, Manche. She was on a voyage from Havre de Grâce, Seine-Inférieure to Cap-Haïtien, Haiti. She was refloated and taken in to Cherbourg, Seine-Inférieure.
Oceanus	Stettin	The ship was driven ashore on Rügen, Prussia. She was on a voyage from Stettin to Calais, France. She was refloated on 14 December and put in to Swinemünde.
Plough	United Kingdom	The ship was wrecked on the Nave Stone Rock, off the coast of County Durham. She was on a voyage from Aberdeen to Newcastle upon Tyne, Northumberland.
Sylvanus	United Kingdom	The ship ran aground on the Haisborough Sands, in the North Sea off the coast of Norfolk. She was on a voyage from South Shields, County Durham to London. She was refloated and taken in to Great Yarmouth, Norfolk in a leaky condition.
True Briton	United Kingdom	The schooner was driven ashore at Flamborough Head. She was on a voyage from Great Yarmouth to Seaham, County Durham. She was refloated the next day and resumed her voyage in a leaky condition, having taken on extra hands.

== 13 December ==
List of shipwrecks: 13 December 1850
Ship	State	Description
Albatross	United Kingdom	The steamship ran aground at Dublin. She was on a voyage from Liverpool, Lancashire to Dublin.
Albion	United Kingdom	The schooner was driven ashore at Wells-next-the-Sea, Norfolk. She was on a voyage from Louth, Lincolnshire to London.
Challenger	United Kingdom	The ship was driven out to sea from Mogador, Morocco and was abandoned by her crew. She was subsequently reboarded and taken in to Mogador.
Earl Grey	United Kingdom	The ship ran aground on the Brigg Rocks and was damaged. She was refloated and put in to Belfast, County Antrim in a leaky condition.
Escurial	France	The brig was driven ashore at Mogador.
Flora	Stettin	The ship was driven ashore between "Falmbo" and Ystad, Sweden. She was on a voyage from Stettin to London. She was refloated and put in to Helsingør, Denmark.
Lord Glenelg	United Kingdom	The brig was driven ashore at Flamborough Head, Yorkshire. She was on a voyage from London to Sunderland, County Durham. She was refloated and resumed her voyage.
Louise	France	The brig ran aground and was severely damaged at Mogador. She was on a voyage from Marseille, Bouches-du-Rhône to Mogador.
New Fair Trader	United Kingdom	The ship ran aground on the Maplin Sands, in the North Sea off the coast of Essex.
Nimble	United Kingdom	The ship was abandoned off Mogador and drifted out to sea.
Rose	United Kingdom	The ship sank off Mogador.
Terpsichore	United Kingdom	The ship was driven ashore at Mogador.
Vitto	Austrian Empire	The full-rigged ship was abandoned off Mogador and drifted out to sea.

== 14 December ==
List of shipwrecks: 14 December 1850
Ship	State	Description
Hebe	United Kingdom	The schooner was abandoned in the Atlantic Ocean. Her crew were rescued by Rhine (France). Hebe was on a voyage from Newfoundland, British North America to Livorno, Grand Duchy of Tuscany.
James	United Kingdom	The ship departed from Tralee, County Kerry for London. No further trace, presumed foundered with the loss of all hands.
John Bright	United Kingdom	The ship ran aground at the mouth of the Whangpoo. She was on a voyage from Newcastle upon Tyne, Northumberland to Shanghai, China.
John Dunn	United Kingdom	The ship collided with the brig Jemima (United Kingdom) and foundered off the Gunfleet Sand, in the North Sea off the coast of Essex. Her crew were rescued.
Loyalty	United Kingdom	The brig ran aground on the Whiting Sand, in the North Sea off the coast of Suffolk. She was refloated and anchored off Hollesley, Suffolk, where she foundered. Her seven crew were rescued by the smacks Aurora's Increase, Tryal and Wonder (all United Kingdom. Loyalty was on a voyage from Sunderland, County Durham to London.
Rose	United Kingdom	The ship ran aground and was damaged at Mogador, Morocco. She was on a voyage from Malta to Mogador.

== 15 December ==
List of shipwrecks: 15 December 1850
Ship	State	Description
Charlotte	(United Kingdom of Great Britain and Ireland) British North America	The ship ran aground and sank at Manawagonish, Nova Scotia. Her crew were rescued. She was on a voyage from Windsor, Nova Scotia to Eastport, Maine, United States.
Emma	Netherlands	The ship was driven ashore at Zoutelande, Zeeland, Netherlands. She was on a voyage from Africa to Antwerp, Belgium. She was consequently condemned.
Europe, and William Shepherd	United Kingdom	The barque Europe collided with William Shepherd and was abandoned in the North Sea with the loss of two of her crew. Survivors were rescued by William Shepherd. Europe was subsequently wrecked on the Gunfleet Sand, off the coast of Essex. William Shepherd put in to Great Yarmouth, Norfolk in a leaky condition.
Mersey	United Kingdom	The ship was wrecked in San Francisco Bay. Her crew were rescued. She was on a voyage from Liverpool, Lancashire to the Sandwich Islands.
Nanette	Belgium	The ship sprang a leak and sank off "Cape Varga". Her crew were rescued.
Paziente Giovanni	Austrian Empire	The barque struck a sunken wreck in the North Sea between the Galloper Sand and the Kentish Knock and was damaged. She was on a voyage from Newcastle upon Tyne, Northumberland, United Kingdom to Venice, Kingdom of Lombardy–Venetia. Pursuit (United Kingdom) towed her in to Lowestoft, Suffolk, United Kingdom in a leaky condition.
Sophie	France	The ship was wrecked in the Bay of Intel with the loss of all but one of her crew. She was on a voyage from Nantes, Loire-Inférieure to Senegal.
Susanna	United Kingdom	The schooner ran aground on the Gunfleet Sand. She was on a voyage from South Shields, County Durham to Whitstable, Kent. She was refloated and taken in to Great Yarmouth in a leaky condition.
Volante	United Kingdom	The steamship sank at Dartmouth, Devon. She was refloated on 26 December.

== 16 December ==
List of shipwrecks: 16 December 1850
Ship	State	Description
Wave	United Kingdom	The brig ran aground on the Holm Sand, in the North Sea off the coast of Suffolk. Whilst aground, she was run into by Magnet (United Kingdom) and further damaged. Wave was on a voyage from the River Tees to London. She was refloated and taken in to Lowestoft, Suffolk in a leaky condition.

== 17 December ==
List of shipwrecks: 17 December 1850
Ship	State	Description
Alonzo	United Kingdom	The ship was in collision with Christiana (United Kingdom) and sank in the Swin, off the coast of Essex. Her crew were rescued by Violet (United Kingdom).
Anna	United Kingdom	The schooner was driven ashore and wrecked at Barassie, Ayrshire. Her crew were rescued.
Jane	United Kingdom	The ship ran aground on the Newcombe Sand, in the North Sea off the coast of Suffolk. She was refloated the next day and taken in to Lowestoft, Suffolk in a sinking condition.
Maria	United Kingdom	The brig was wrecked on the Naas Sands, Glamorgan with the loss of all hands. She was on a voyage from Swansea to Cardiff.

== 18 December ==
List of shipwrecks: 18 December 1850
Ship	State	Description
Aurora	(flag) Kingdom of Hanover	The ship was driven ashore and damaged at Jever.
Isabella	United Kingdom	The ship sprang a leak whilst of a voyage from Newcastle upon Tyne, Northumberland to Perth. She put in to Staxigoe, Highland.
Liberty	United Kingdom	The brig ran aground on the Rough Sand, in the North Sea off the coast of Suffolk. She was on a voyage from Newcastle upon Tyne to London. She was refloated and anchored off Corton, Suffolk.
Mountaineer	United Kingdom	The ship was beached in Dunmanus Bay. She was on a voyage from Quebec City, Province of Canada, British North America to Newport, Monmouthshire.
Solon	United Kingdom	The ship ran aground on the Newcombe Sand, in the North Sea off the coast of Suffolk. She was refloated.
Susan	United Kingdom	The ship was driven ashore and severely damaged at Tresco, Isles of Scilly. She was on a voyage from Newport, Monmouthshire to Plymouth, Devon.
Wilhelm	Netherlands	The galiot was driven ashore in a capsized condition in St. George's Bay, France. Crew presumed lost.
Zufreidenheit	Kingdom of Hanover	The ship was driven ashore at Jever.

== 19 December ==
List of shipwrecks: 19 December 1850
Ship	State	Description
Adelaide	United Kingdom	The ship was wrecked in the Sesarga Islands, Spain with the loss of sixteen of the seventeen people on board. Her captain was the only survivor. She was on a voyage from Bristol, Gloucestershire to Saint Vincent.
Constantine	United Kingdom	The ship was driven ashore 4 nautical miles (7.4 km) from Roquetas de Mar, Spain. She was on a voyage from Alexandria, Egypt to Liverpool, Lancashire. She floated off but consequently sank. Her crew and a passenger were rescued.
Courageux	France	The schooner was driven ashore and wrecked at Port Eynon, Glamorgan, United Kingdom.
Eduardo	Spain	The ship ran aground and was wrecked at Bilbao. She was on a voyage from Tarragona to Bilbao.
Maria	United Kingdom	The ship was driven ashore at Great Yarmouth, Norfolk.
Roelfina	Netherlands	The ship was driven ashore at Berry Head, Devon, United Kingdom. Her crew were rescued. She was on a voyage from Amsterdam, North Holland to Bilbao, Spain.
Union	United Kingdom	The ship was in collision with a brig in the North Sea. She was assisted in to Bridlington, Yorkshire, where she sank.

== 20 December ==
List of shipwrecks: 20 December 1850
Ship	State	Description
Æron	United Kingdom	The ship struck rocks and sank in Broad Sound. Her crew were rescued. She was on a voyage from Llanelly, Glamorgan to Cardigan.
Charlotte Maria	United Kingdom	The ship was driven ashore at Cabreta Point, Spain. She was on a voyage from Liverpool, Lancashire to Brindisi, Kingdom of the Two Sicilies. She was refloated on 24 December and taken in to Málaga, Spain in a leaky condition.
Hannah Brewer	(United Kingdom of Great Britain and Ireland) British North America	The barque capsized at Saint John, New Brunswick.
Johan	Sweden	The barque was wrecked on the English Bank, in the River Plate. She was on a voyage from the Cape Verde Islands to Buenos Aires, Argentina.
Osprey	United States	The barque departed from Havre de Grâce, Seine-Inférieure, France for Philadelphia, Pennsylvania. No further trace, presumed foundered with the loss of all hands.
Prima Vera	(United Kingdom of Great Britain and Ireland) British North America	The ship was driven ashore near Louisbourg, Nova Scotia. She was on a voyage from the Gut of Canso to Halifax, Nova Scotia. She was declared a total loss.

== 21 December ==
List of shipwrecks: 21 December 1850
Ship	State	Description
Brave	United Kingdom	The ship was driven ashore and severely damaged at Brora, Sutherland. She was refloated.
Countess of Yarborough	(United Kingdom of Great Britain and Ireland) New South Wales	The ship ran aground on the Sow and Pigs Shoal. She was on a voyage from Sydney to Adelaide, South Australia.
Florence	United Kingdom	The full-rigged ship was abandoned in the Atlantic Ocean. Her crew were rescued by Montrose (United Kingdom). Florence was discovered the next day by the steamship Madrid (Spain) and the smack Rising Sun (United Kingdom). She was taken in to A Coruña, Spain.
Sultana	United Kingdom	The brig was damaged at Mogador, Morocco. She was consequently condemned.

== 22 December ==
List of shipwrecks: 22 December 1850
Ship	State	Description
Helen Mar	United States	The schooner was wrecked on rocks between the Vaughn Island and Green Island, Maine. Her crew were rescued.
Ophir	United States	The ship was wrecked on the Nantucket Shoals, in the Atlantic Ocean off the coast of Massachusetts with the loss of all hands. She was on a voyage from New York to Yarmouth, Massachusetts.
Susan Taylor	United States	The schooner was driven ashore and wrecked on Green Island, Maine.
Wave	United States	The schooner was driven ashore and wrecked at Cape Porpoise, Maine. Her crew were rescued.

== 23 December ==
List of shipwrecks: 23 December 1850
Ship	State	Description
Ada	(United Kingdom of Great Britain and Ireland) British North America	The ship was driven ashore and wrecked at Race Point. She was on a voyage from LaHave, Nova Scotia to Boston, Massachusetts, United States.
Emmy	Hamburg	The ship was wrecked in the Cape Verde Islands. All on board survived. She was on a voyage from Hamburg to California, United States. The passengers of the Hamburgh ship Emmy, from Hamburgh, bound to California, wer taken into Rio by the American bark Clara, C. Bell, t he ship having been wrecked at the Cape Verde on the 23d of December last. (All text) ------ https://www.thetimes.com/tto/archive/article/1851-04-16/8/4.html
Gipsy	United Kingdom	The schooner was driven ashore at Southport, New York, United States. She was on a voyage from Saint Andrews, New Brunswick to Bath, Maine, United States.
Helen	United Kingdom	The ship ran aground on Scroby Sands, Norfolk. She was on a voyage from Newcastle upon Tyne, Northumberland to Bahia, Brazil. She was refloated and taken in to Great Yarmouth, Norfolk.
Magnet	United Kingdom	The ship was driven ashore and wrecked in Sea Bear Bay, Argentina.
Norden	Norway	The schooner was driven ashore. She was refloated and towed in to Stockholm, Sweden by the steamship Hercules (Sweden), where she sprang a leak and sank.
Nordenskiold	Norway	The ship was driven ashore and damaged near Tromsø. She was on a voyage from Altona to Tromsø. She was refloated and completed her voyage.
Susan	United States	The ship departed from Cette, Hérault for New Orleans, Louisiana. No further trace, presumed foundered with the loss of all hands.

== 24 December ==
List of shipwrecks: 24 December 1850
Ship	State	Description
Ada	United States	The ship was driven ashore near the Race Point Lighthouse, Massachusetts. She was on a voyage from Le Havre, Seine-Inférieure, France to Boston, Massachusetts.
Asia	United Kingdom	The ship was driven ashore at Yedikule, Ottoman Empire. She was on a voyage from Constantinople, Ottoman Empire to Cork or Falmouth, Cornwall. She was refloated and taken in to "Stenia" for repairs.
Cristina	Sweden	The schooner was wrecked off "Thornley", Denmark with the loss of twenty of her 23 crew. She was on a voyage from Grangemouth, Stirlingshire, United Kingdom to Malmö.
Louisa	Denmark	The ship ran aground on the Swinebottoms, in the Baltic Sea off the coast of Denmark. She was on a voyage from Batavia, Netherlands East Indies to Copenhagen. She had become a wreck by 31 December.
Maria	Netherlands	The ship was wrecked on Ameland, Friesland. She was on a voyage from Amsterdam, North Holland to Hamburg.
Reubens	Belgium	The barque struck a rock off Buena Vista and was wrecked. Her crew were rescued. She was on a voyage from Antwerp to Singapore.

== 25 December ==
List of shipwrecks: 25 December 1850
Ship	State	Description
Brinder	United Kingdom	The smack was abandoned in the Irish Sea. She was on a voyage from Fleetwood, Lancashire to Belfast, County Antrim. She was towed back to Fleetwood in a derelict condition.
Krone	United Kingdom	The brig was wrecked on the Rhyddlan Patches, in the Irish Sea off the coast of Denbighshire. She was on a voyage from Chester, Cheshire to Palermo, Sicily.
New Hope	United Kingdom	The ship was driven ashore at Porthdinllaen, Caernarfonshire. She was on a voyage from Cardiff, Glamorgan to Liverpool, Lancashire.

== 26 December ==
List of shipwrecks: 26 December 1850
Ship	State	Description
Antina Elsina	Belgium	The ship was driven ashore and severely damaged at Valkinisse, Zeeland, Netherlands. She was on a voyage from Messina, Sicily to Antwerp.
Home	United States	The ship was driven ashore on Hog Island, New York City. She was on a voyage from Fall River, Massachusetts to New York City. She was refloated the next day.
Isabella	United Kingdom	The ship was driven ashore at Flamborough Head, Yorkshire. She was refloated.
Josephine	Sweden	The ship departed from Newcastle upon Tyne, Northumberland, United Kingdom for Oran, Algeria. No further trace, presumed foundered with the loss of all hands.

== 27 December ==
List of shipwrecks: 27 December 1850
Ship	State	Description
Antina Elsina	Belgium	The ship ran aground on the Valkenisse Bank, in the North Sea. She was on a voyage from Messina, Sicily to Antwerp. She was refloated on 19 January 1851 and towed in to Antwerp.
Carolina	Norway	The ship was driven ashore 10 nautical miles (19 km) north of Bergen. She was on a voyage from St. Ubes, Portugal to Christiansand.
Clemence	France	The ship was driven ashore near Cette, Hérault. Her crew were rescued. She was on a voyage from Toulon, Var to Licatat, Sicily.
Comet	United Kingdom	The schooner was in collision with the barque Midlothian (United Kingdom) and sank in the Atlantic Ocean. Her crew were rescued by Midlothian. Comet was on a voyage from Whitstable, Kent to São Miguel Island, Azores.
Elida	Sweden	The ship was driven ashore on Suur-Pakri, Russia. She was on a voyage from Wismar to Stockholm.
Sultana	United States	The ship ran aground and capsized at Boston, Massachusetts. She was refloated the next day and placed under repair.
Vesta	Duchy of Holstein	The ship was in collision with a steamship in the English Channel off Dungeness, Kent and was damaged. She put in to Dover, Kent in a leaky condition and ran aground there. She was on a voyage from Santa Cruz to Flensburg.

== 28 December ==
List of shipwrecks: 28 December 1850
Ship	State	Description
Afina Jonker	Netherlands	The ship was driven ashore on Terschelling, Friesland. She was on a voyage from Danzig to Amsterdam, North Holland.
Panope	United Kingdom	The ship was driven ashore near Missolonghi, Greece. She was on a voyage from Patras, Greece to London. She was refloated and resumed her voyage.
Prima Vera	(United Kingdom of Great Britain and Ireland) British North America	The ship was driven ashore and wrecked near Louisbourg, Nova Scotia. She was on a voyage from Canso to Halifax.

== 29 December ==
List of shipwrecks: 29 December 1850
Ship	State	Description
John and Mary	United Kingdom	The ship ran aground on the Trindle Reef, in the Baltic Sea off the coast of Sweden. She was on a voyage from Gothenburg, Sweden to London. She was refloated and put back to Gothenburg in a waterlogged condition.
Liberia	(United Kingdom of Great Britain and Ireland) British North America	The ship was driven ashore near "Marie-Joseph", She was on a voyage from Port aux Basque, Newfoundland to Halifax, Nova Scotia.

== 30 December ==
List of shipwrecks: 30 December 1851
Ship	State	Description
Bernard	United Kingdom	The brig ran aground on the Corton Sand, in the North Sea off the coast of Suffolk. She was refloated and taken in to Great Yarmouth, Norfolk.
Clara	United Kingdom	The barque was wrecked on the Cobden Rock, off Barbados. Her crew were rescued. She was on a voyage from Newport, Monmouthshire to Kingston, Jamaica.
John and Margaret	United Kingdom	The brig was driven ashore near Red Head, Florida, United States.
Mersey	United Kingdom	The barque was driven ashore and wrecked at North Head, California, United States. Her crew were rescued.
Seraskier	France	The ship was driven ashore at Barber's Point, in the Dardanelles. She was on a voyage from Marseille, Bouches-du-Rhône to Constantinople, Ottoman Empire and Odesa.
Victor	Norway	The ship ran aground and sank off Öland, Sweden. Her crew were rescued. She was on a voyage from Bergen to Lund, Sweden.

== 31 December ==
List of shipwrecks: 31 December 1850
Ship	State	Description
Anna and Paul	Prussia	The ship was driven ashore at Hela. She was on a voyage from Königsberg to Stettin. She was refloated and taken in to Danzig for repairs.
Robert	Prussia	The ship was driven ashore and wrecked 24 nautical miles (44 km) from Memel. Her crew were rescued. She was on a voyage from Memel to Wisbech, Cambridgeshire, United Kingdom.
Shannon	United Kingdom	The schooner was wrecked at Rhoscolyn, Anglesey with the loss of a crew member. She was on a voyage from Saint-Gilles to Liverpool, Lancashire.
Sylphide	Sweden	The brig was wrecked in the Dry Tortugas. She was on a voyage from New Orleans, Louisiana, United States to Trieste.

== Unknown date ==
List of shipwrecks: Unknown date in December 1850
Ship	State	Description
Anna Petronella	Russia	The ship was driven ashore at the Fort de Nolle, Vlissingen, Zeeland, Netherlands. She was on a voyage from Riga to Antwerp, Belgium. She was consequently condemned.
Augusta	United Kingdom	The ship was driven ashore in the Salween River.
Brenda	United Kingdom	The smack ran aground at Peel, Isle of Man and was abandoned. She was subsequently towed in to Fleetwood, Lancashire, where she arrived on 26 December.
Clara	France	The ship was wrecked at Ormanlı, Ottoman Empire, before 14 December. Her crew were rescued. She was on a voyage from Taganrog, Russia to an English port.
Clyde	(United Kingdom of Great Britain and Ireland) Gambia Colony and Protectorate	The ship was abandoned in the Atlantic Ocean. Her crew were rescued by Louisa (United Kingdom). Clyde was on a voyage from London to Bathurst.
Diana	Prussia	The ship was abandoned in the Atlantic Ocean. Her crew were rescued by Olivier (France). Diana was on a voyage from South Shields, County Durham, United Kingdom to New York City, United States.
Duchess of Kent	United Kingdom	The ship foundered before 12 December. Her crew were rescued by Mary Seaton (United Kingdom). Duchess of Kent was on a voyage from Saldanha Bay to Cork.
Edouard	France	The ship was wrecked at Cape Trenton before 19 December. Her crew were rescued. She was on a voyage from Rouen, Seine-Inférieure to Paris.
Enterprise	United Kingdom	The ship ran aground off the Rammekens Castle, Zeeland, Netherlands. She was on a voyage from Antwerp, Belgium to Guatemala.
Euphrosyne	(United Kingdom of Great Britain and Ireland) British North America	The ship was wrecked near Arichat, Nova Scotia. She was on a voyage from Arichat to Salem, Massachusetts, United States.
George and Richard	United Kingdom	The brig ran aground and was wrecked off Montevideo, Uruguay. Her crew were rescued.
Georgiana	United Kingdom	The ship was wrecked on The Skerries, in the Irish Sea off the coast of County Antrim before 23 December. She was on a voyage from Dublin to Gloucester.
Gustaf Adolf	Russia	The ship departed from Falmouth, Cornwall for Limerick, United Kingdom. No further trace, presumed foundered with the loss of all hands.
Isabella	United Kingdom	The ship was abandoned in the North Sea. Her crew were rescued. She was on a voyage from Whitby, Yorkshire to London. She was taken in to Margate, Kent.
Liverpool	United Kingdom	The steamship ran aground and sank off Texel, North Holland. Her crew were rescued. She was on a voyage from London to Bremen.
Locheil	United Kingdom	The ship was lost off Saint Domingo before 24 December.
Minatchy	France	The ship was driven ashore at Santa Maria, Réunion before 21 December.
Minnet	United Kingdom	The ship was driven ashore near "Lerhamn", Sweden. She was refloated and taken in to Landskrona, where she arrived on 19 December.
Monantum	United Kingdom	The ship was destroyed by fire in the Pacific Ocean before 15 December. Her crew were rescued by Symmetry (United Kingdom).
Nemorin	France	The brig was wrecked on the Jenni Kale Bank, off the coast of the Ottoman Empire, before 14 December.
Neptune	France	The ship was wrecked on Minorca, Spain on 28 or 29 December. Her crew were rescued. She was on a voyage from Saint Laurent, Province of Canada, British North America to Marseille, Bouches-du-Rhône
Nonatum	United Kingdom	The ship was destroyed by fire in the Pacific Ocean. Her crew were rescued by Symmetry (United Kingdom).
Puakelahua	Chile	The schooner struck a sunken rock and sank at Hanapepe, Sandwich Islands. Her crew survived.
Proteus	Prussia	The ship foundered off the Shetland Islands, United Kingdom before 18 December. She was on a voyage from Sunderland, County Durham, United Kingdom to New York, United States.
Rose	United Kingdom	The schooner was driven ashore on the French coast between 24 and 31 December. She was on a voyage from Dunkirk, Nord, France to London.
Waldron	United States	The full-rigged ship caught fire and was abandoned off "Carcars Island". She was on a voyage from Baltimore, Maryland to California.
