= Huis der Boede =

Dutch country house

Coordinates: 51°28′23″N 3°33′41″E

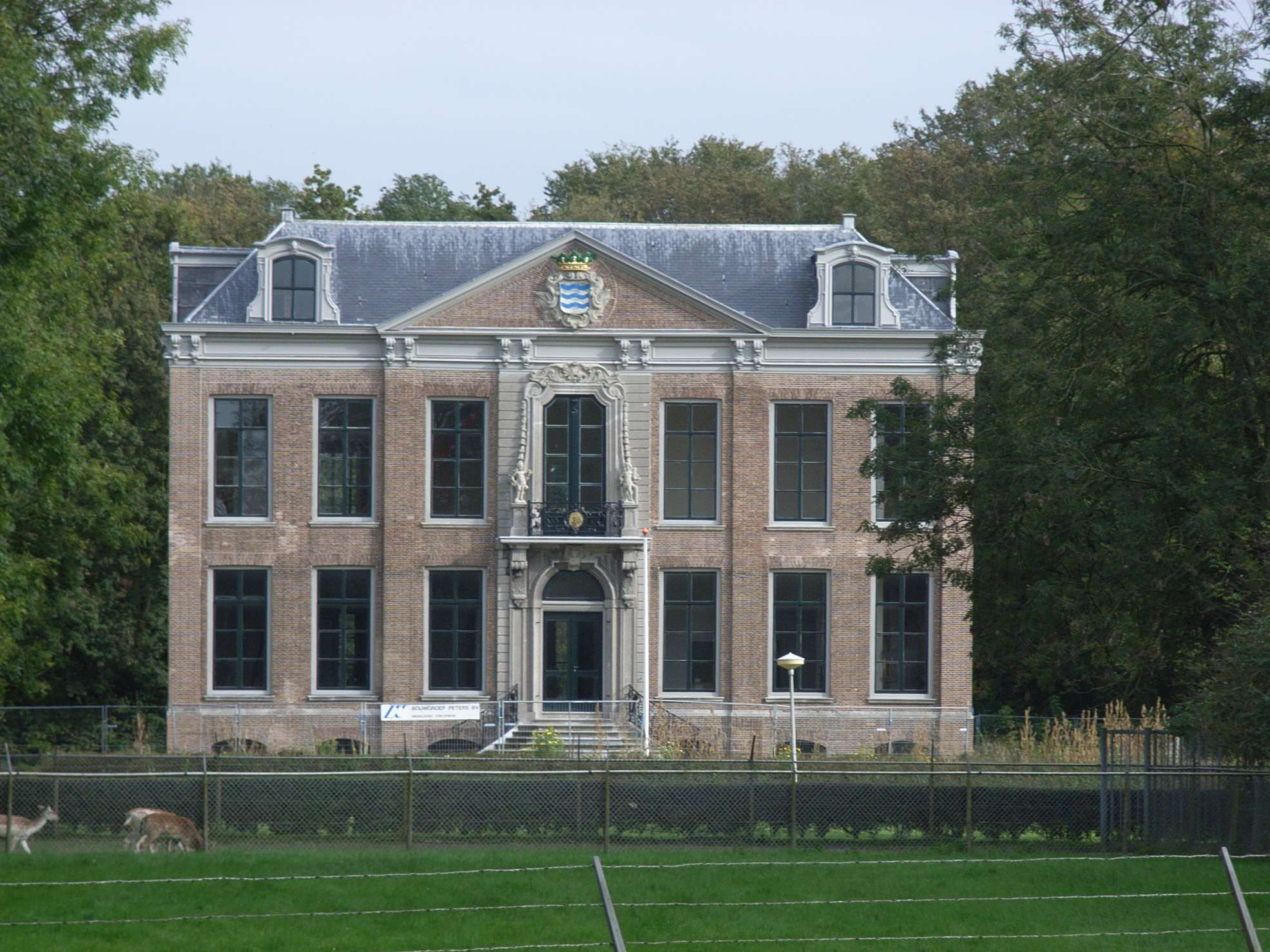
Front view

Huis der Boede is a country house near Koudekerke in the Dutch province of Zeeland, erected in 1745 for J. van Mandere, mayor of Vlissingen. For its design, he commissioned the Antwerp architect and sculptor Jan Pieter van Baurscheidt the Younger.
