= Biggekerke =

- Village
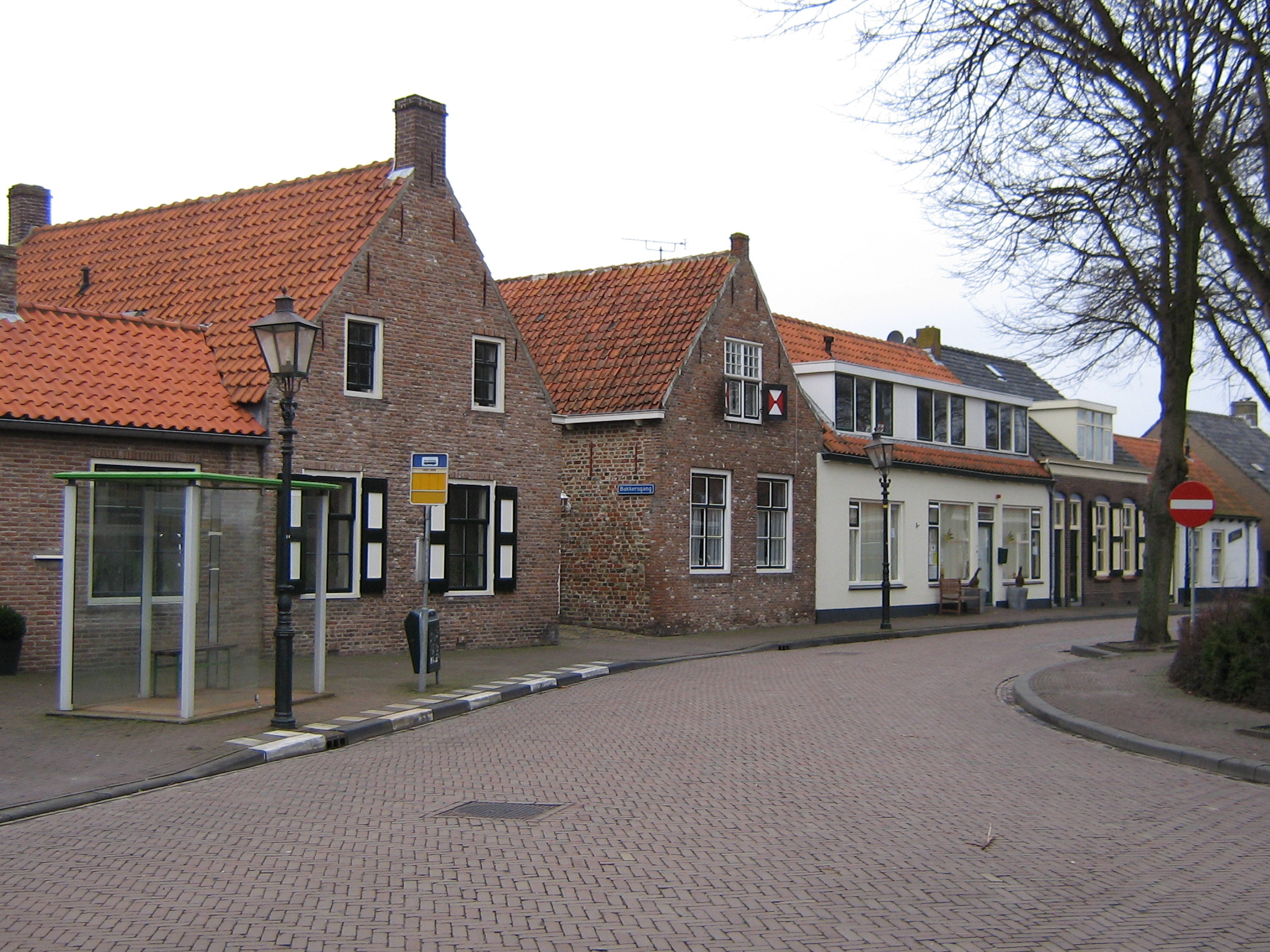
- Street view

- Coat of arms

- Location in the province of Zeeland in the Netherlands Biggekerke (Netherlands)
- Coordinates: 51°29′54″N 3°31′31″E
- Country: Netherlands
- Province: Zeeland
- Municipality: Veere

Area
  - Total: 21.34 km^{2} (8.24 sq mi)
- Elevation: 2.9 m (9.5 ft)

Population (2021)
  - Total: 1,550
  - Density: 72.6/km^{2} (188/sq mi)
- Time zone: UTC+1 (CET)
  - Summer (DST): UTC+2 (CEST)
- Postal code: 4521
- Dialing code: 0115

Biggekerke is a village in the Dutch province of Zeeland. It is a part of the municipality of Veere, and lies about 6 km northwest of Vlissingen.

== History ==
The village was first mentioned in 1231 as Bigghenkerka, and means "(private) church of Biggo (person)". Biggekerke is a circular church village. It used to be a heerlijkheid and had a castle. The castle was destroyed in 1433 by Middelburg as ordered by Philip the Good.

The Dutch Reformed church is a single aisled church. The tower dates from around 1400. The nave was probably constructed in the 17th century. The grist mill Brassers Molen was built in 1712 by the city of Vlissingen and leased for seven year periods. The wind mill has remained in service throughout its existence, but was restored multiple time.

Biggekerke was home to 467 people in 1840. In 1943, the Widerstandsnest Carmen was built in the dunes near Biggekerke as part of the Atlantic Wall. It was captured by the Allies in 1944. The village was bombarded on 17 September 1944 which resulted in the death of 45 citizens.

Biggekerke used to a separate municipality until 1966 when it was merged into Valkenisse. In 1997, it became part of Veere.

== Gallery ==
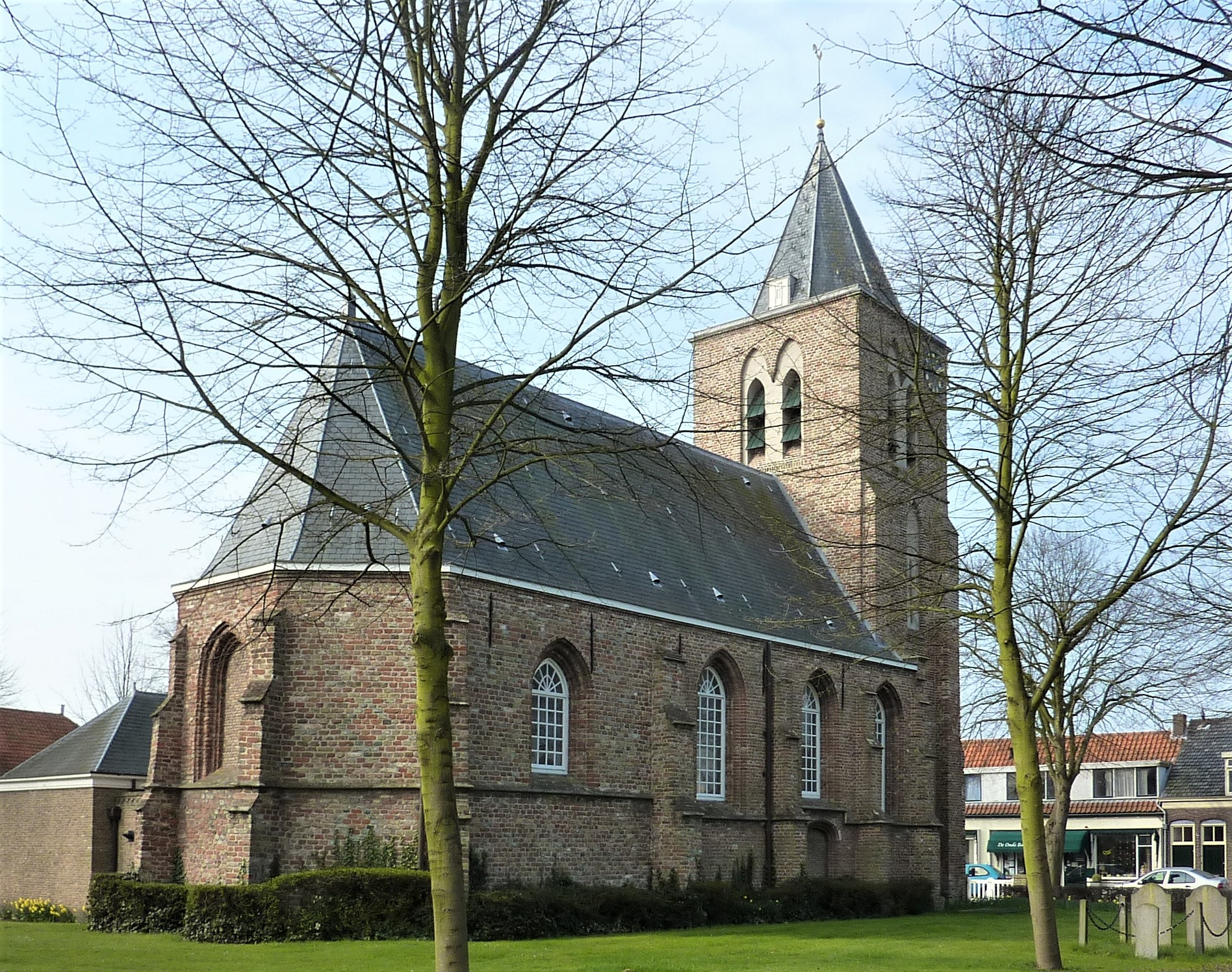
Dutch Reformed church

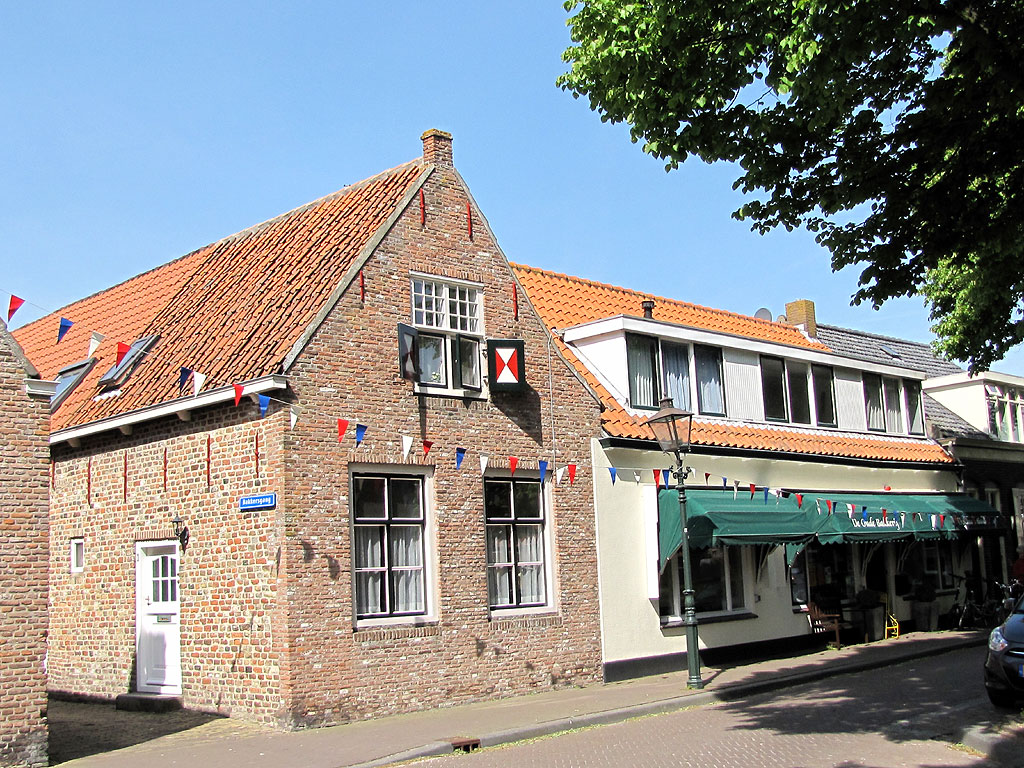
Houses in Biggekerke

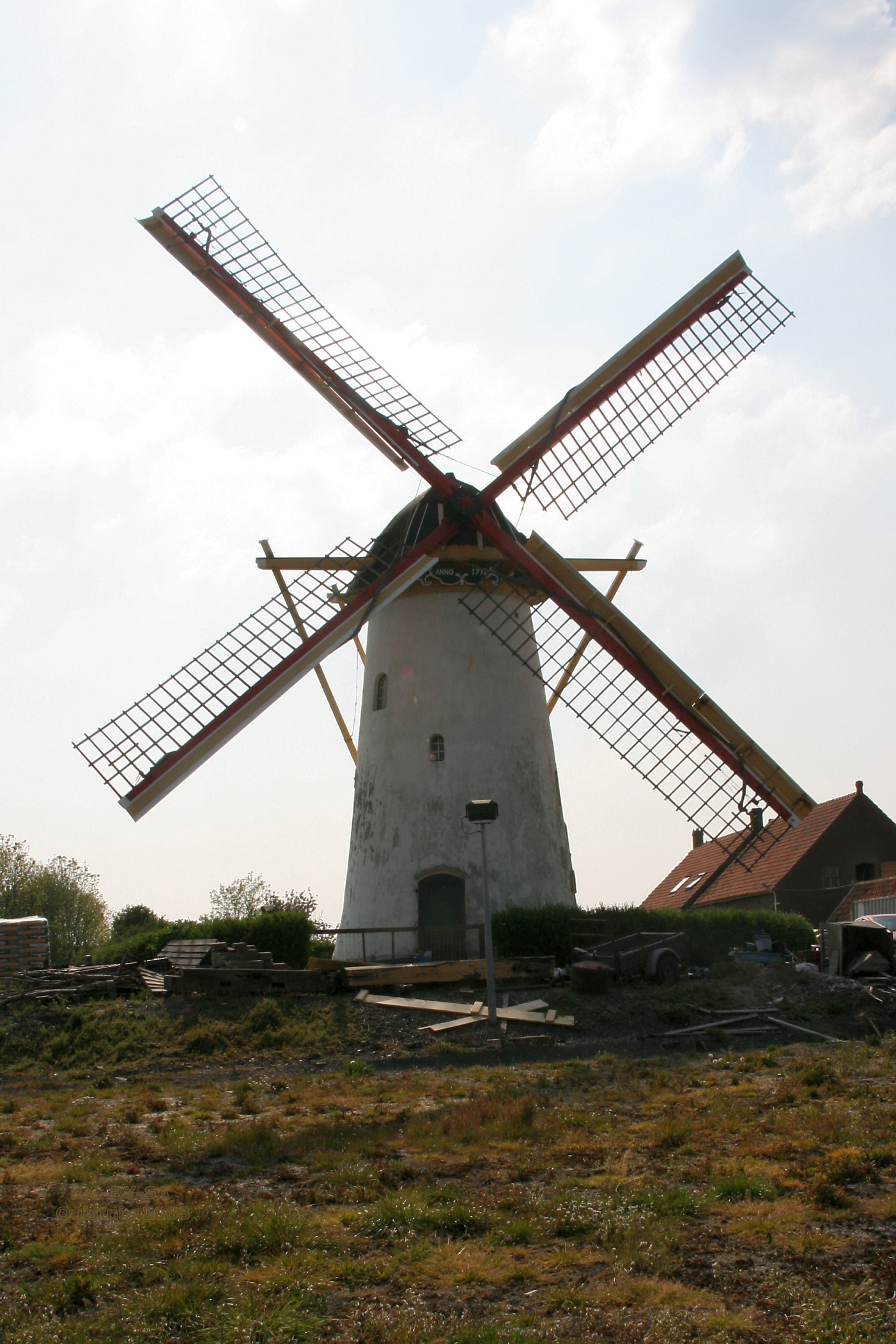
Wind mill Brassers Molen

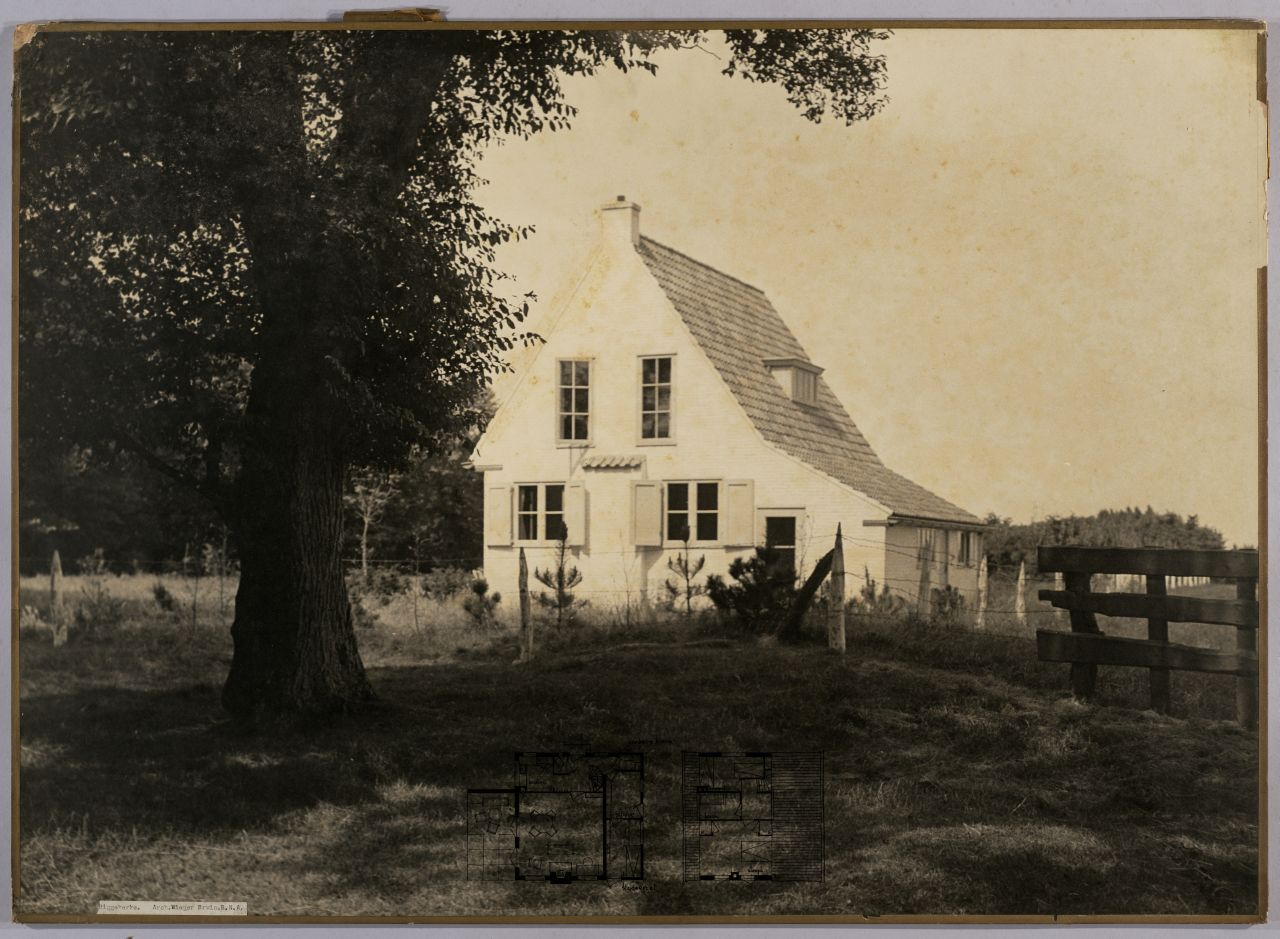
Country house (early 20th century)
