= Koudekerke =

- Village
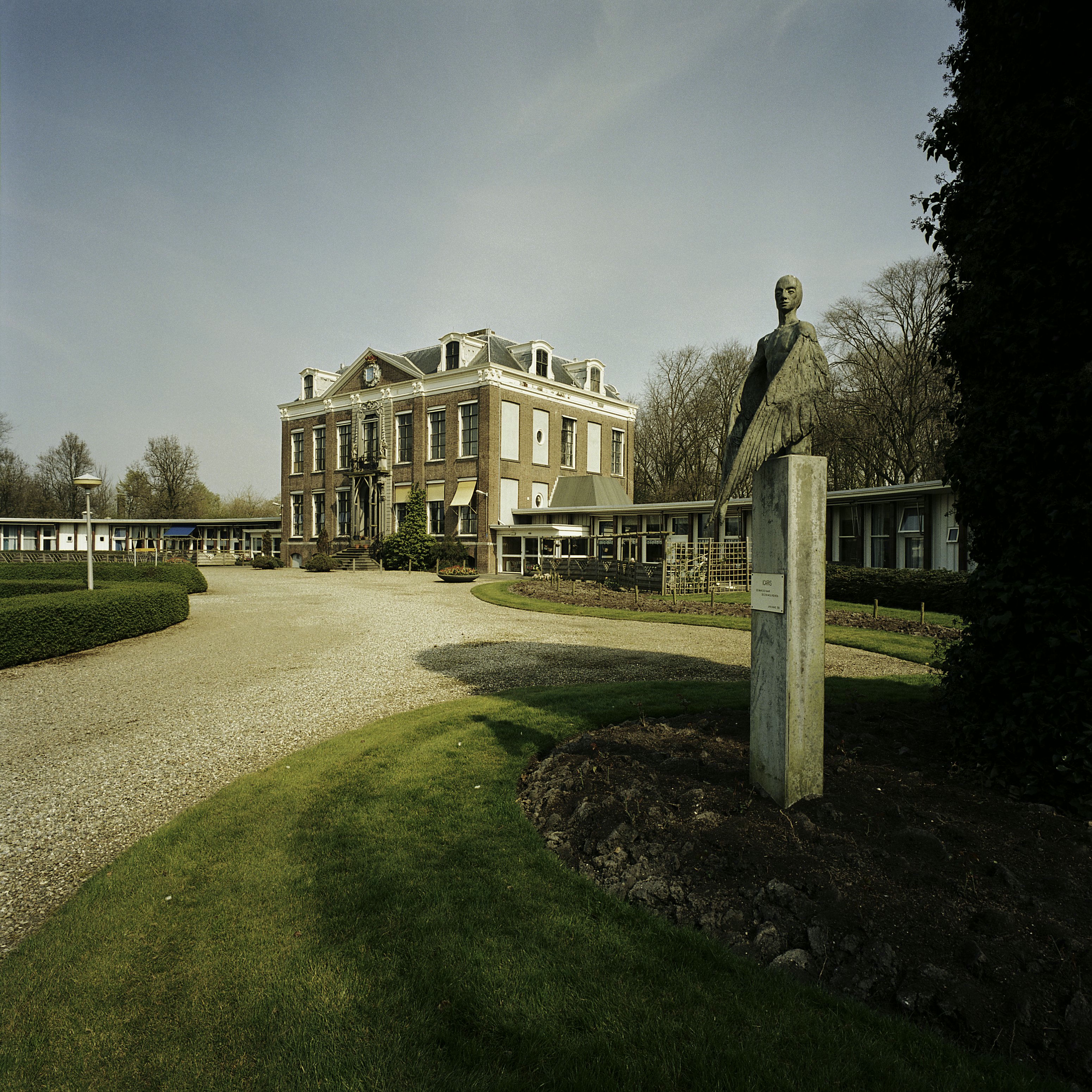
- Huis der Boede

- Coat of arms

- Location in the province of Zeeland in the Netherlands Koudekerke (Netherlands)
- Coordinates: 51°29′51″N 3°33′10″E
- Country: Netherlands
- Province: Zeeland
- Municipality: Veere

Area
  - Total: 11.57 km^{2} (4.47 sq mi)
- Elevation: 2.1 m (6.9 ft)

Population (2021)
  - Total: 3,280
  - Density: 283/km^{2} (734/sq mi)
- Time zone: UTC+1 (CET)
  - Summer (DST): UTC+2 (CEST)
- Postal code: 4371
- Dialing code: 0118

Koudekerke (Zeelandic: Koukerke) is a village in the region of Walcheren in the Dutch province of Zeeland. It is a part of the municipality of Veere. As of 2018, the census reported the village has a population of 3,419, making it the largest settlement in Veere. The built-up area of the village was 0.55 km², and contained 1,133 residences.

== History ==
The village was first mentioned between 1181 and 1210 as Coldekirca, and means "abandoned church". Koudekerke is a circular church village which developed in the Middle Ages on a ridge.

The Dutch Reformed church is an aisleless church with ridge turret which was built in the mid-17th century as a replacement of the medieval church. Huis der Boede is manor house built in 1733 Louis XIV style on the location of a 13th-century estate. In 1950, it became a retirement home. The carriage house was demolished in 1970.

Koudekerke was home to 1.211 people in 1840. On 1 November 1941, part of the Koudekerke was annexed by Middelburg. In 1944, the land was inundated and the population was evacuated.

After World War II, it became a commuter village. The nearby hamlet of Dishoek became the tourist centre due to its beaches, and contains holiday homes, campsites and hotels. Koudekerke was an independent municipality until 1966, when it was merged into Valkenisse. In 1997, it was merged into Veere.

== Gallery ==
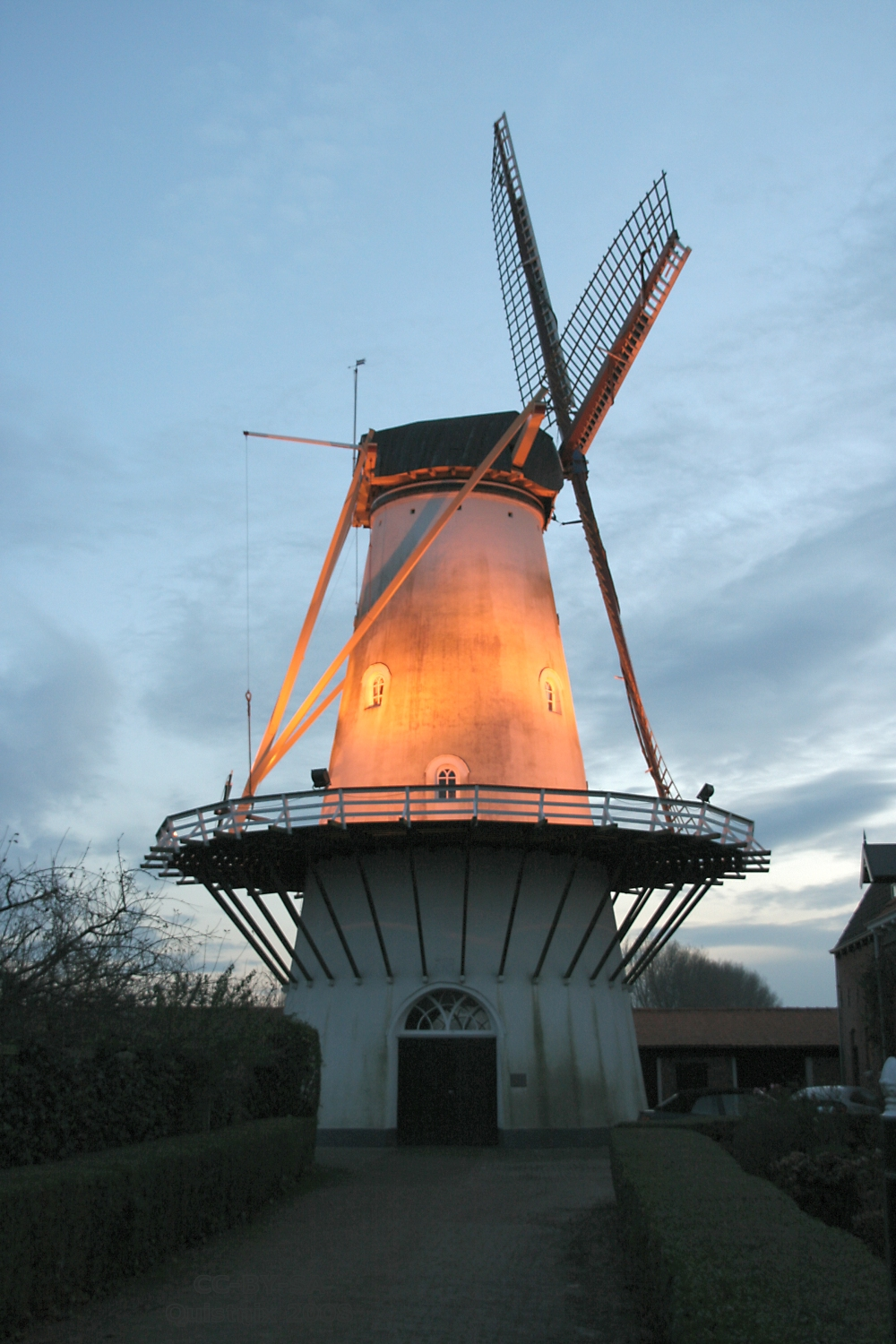
Windmill "De Lelie"

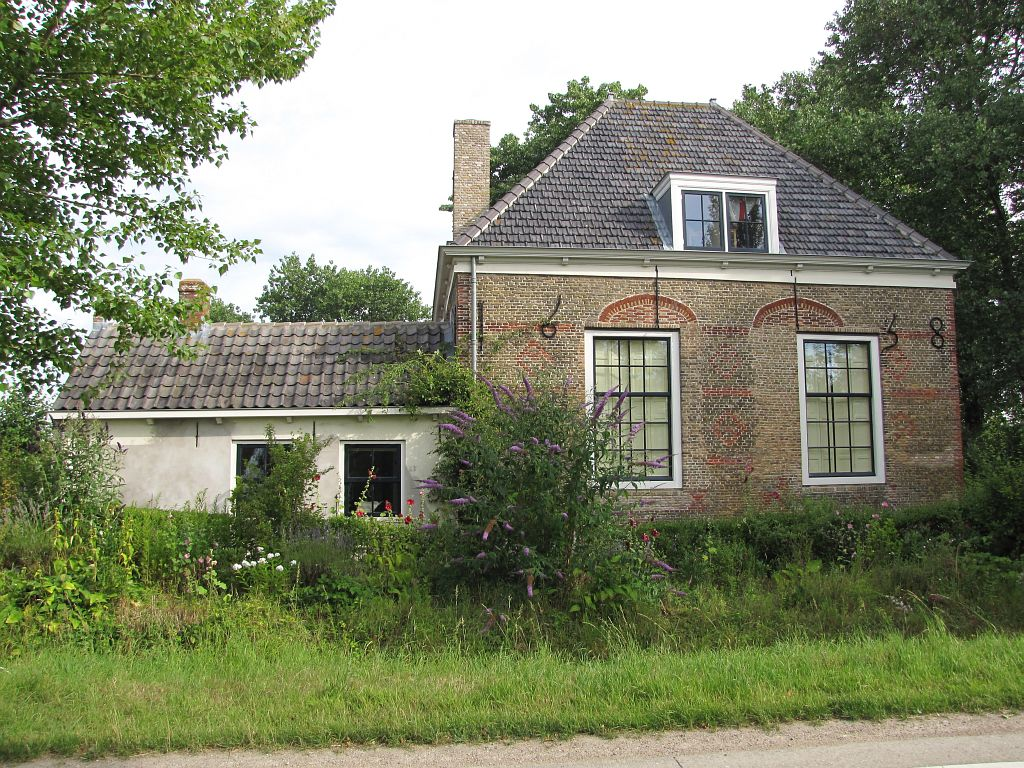
Farmhouse at Dishoekseweg

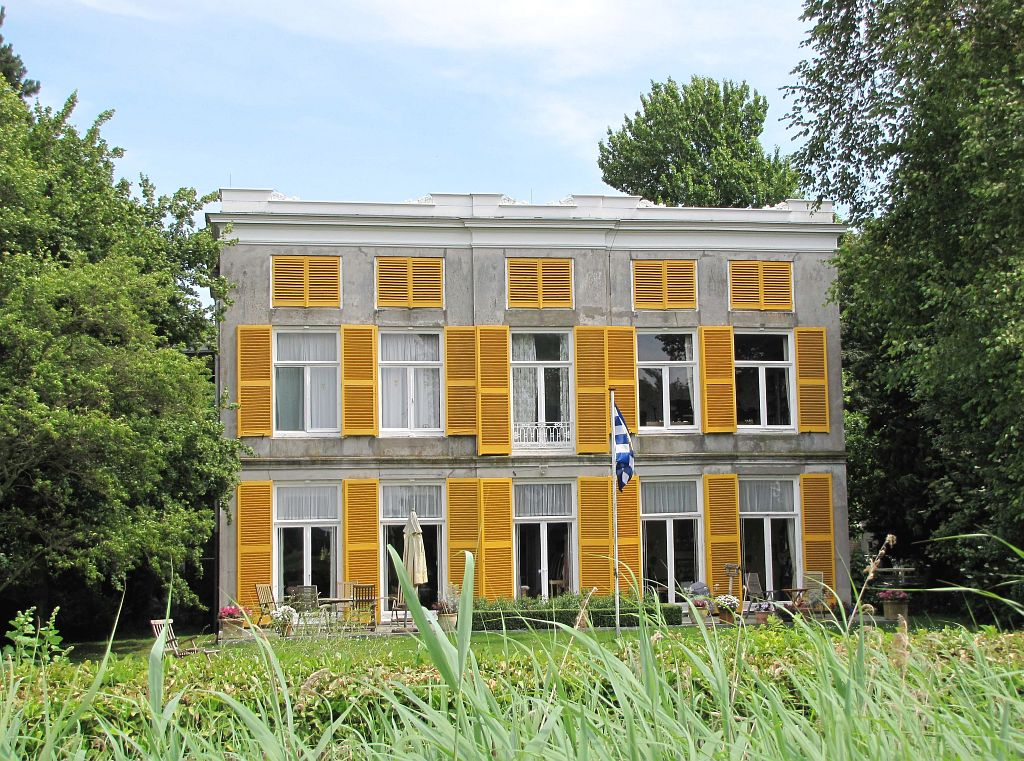
Huis Moesbosch

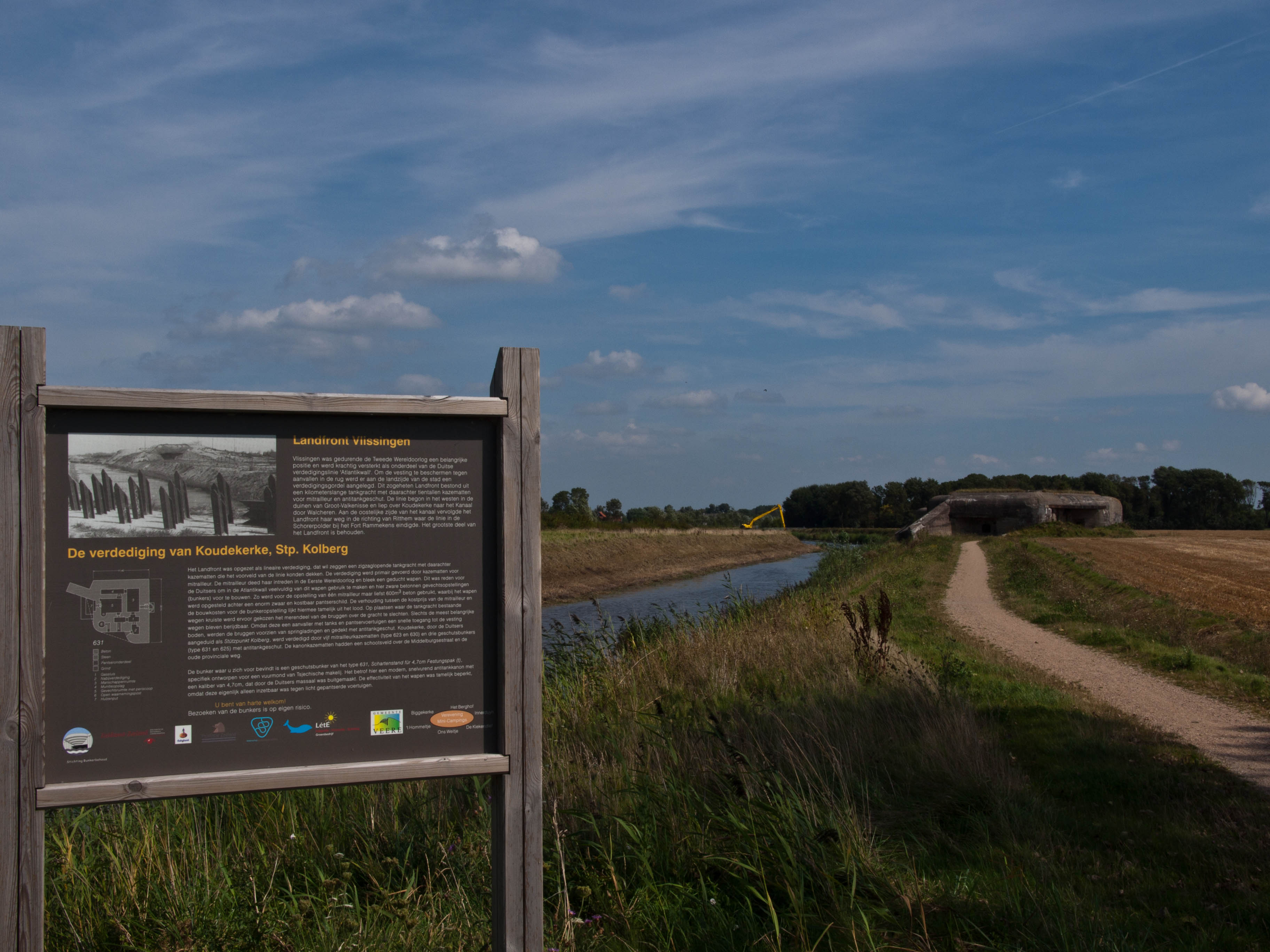
German Bunker from WWII in Koudekerke
