= Zoutelande =

- Village
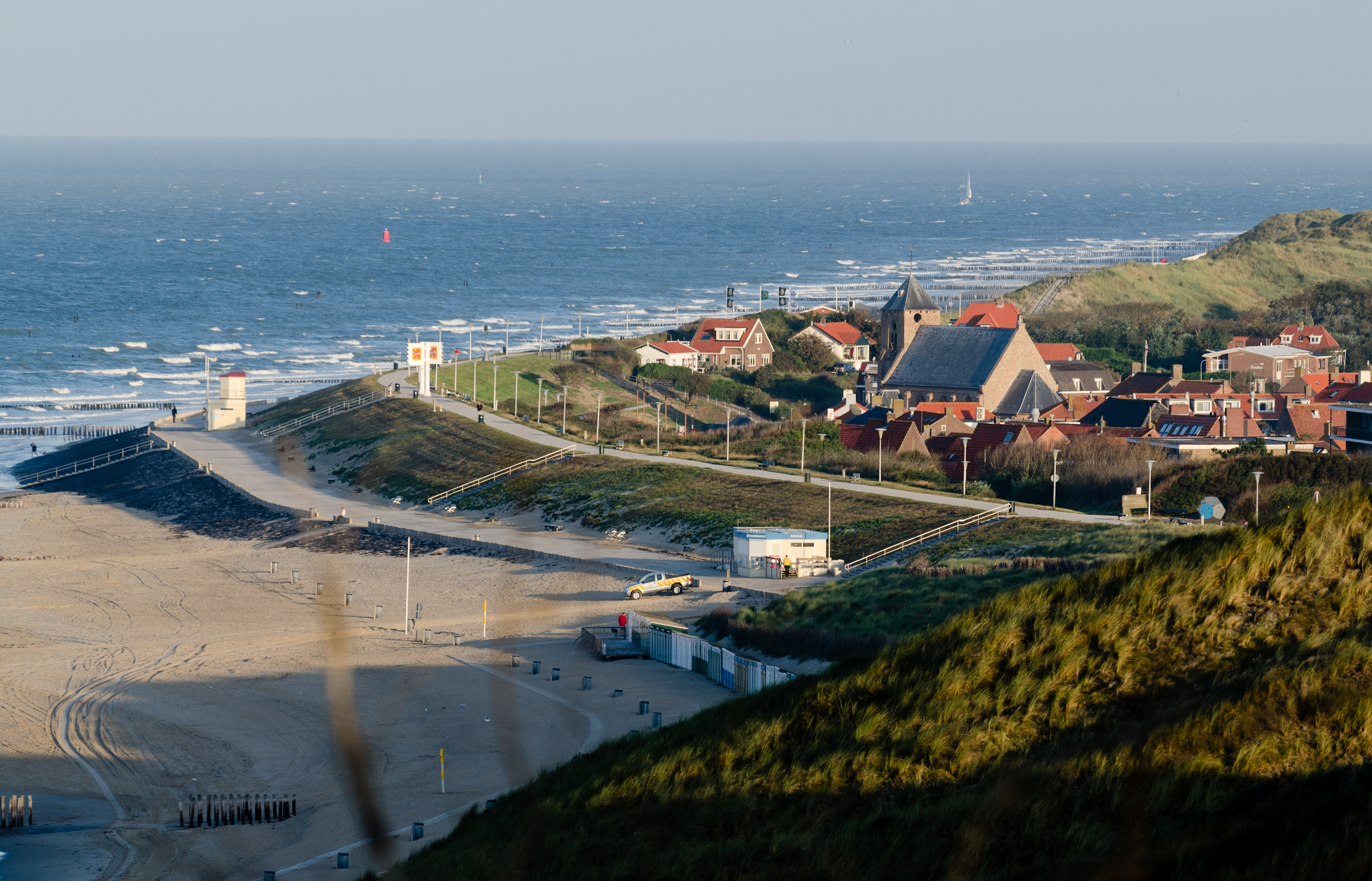

- Coat of arms

- Location in the province of Zeeland in the Netherlands Zoutelande (Netherlands)
- Coordinates: 51°30′5″N 3°29′5″E
- Country: Netherlands
- Province: Zeeland
- Municipality: Veere

Area
  - Total: 7.40 km^{2} (2.86 sq mi)
- Elevation: 1.0 m (3.3 ft)

Population (2021)
  - Total: 1,660
  - Density: 224/km^{2} (581/sq mi)
- Time zone: UTC+1 (CET)
  - Summer (DST): UTC+2 (CEST)
- Postal code: 4374
- Dialing code: 0118

Zoutelande (Zeelandic: Zóetelande) is a village in the southwestern Netherlands. It is located in the municipality of Veere, Zeeland, between Dishoek and Westkapelle on the former island Walcheren. On 1 January 2005 it had 1,556 inhabitants. Originally, Zoutelande was mainly an agricultural village. The village's character changed slowly into a tourist resort as the demand for beach recreation rose from about the middle of the 19th century.

Zoutelande was a separate municipality until 1966, when it became a part of the new municipality Valkenisse.

Nowadays, tourism is Zoutelande's most important source of existence. Zoutelande, together with the beach of Dishoek and Westkapelle, are often called "Zeeland's Rivièra", after the famous south-coast of France. It is one of Zeeland's most-visited coasts, and one of the few places in the Netherlands where the beach faces south. Plenty of rooms, studios, bungalows and apartments are available to thousands of visitors every summer; most of the tourists are of German origin, although other nationalities are also widely represented. The remaining agriculture in the area benefits of the demand for accommodation in the form of mini-campings. Bicycle-rental, beachfront establishments, hotels, B&Bs, shops and a boulevard are all to be found in and around the village.

Like Domburg, Zoutelande was a favorite among Dutch painters, like Ferdinand Hart Nibbrig, Piet Mondriaan and Jan Toorop who praised its sky. It is said that the reflection of the sun on the water colors the sky more brilliantly and transparently than anywhere else.

Zoutelande was the subject of a 2017 song of the same name by Dutch rock band BLØF featuring Belgian singer Geike Arnaert; the song's popularity brought some increased interest in the village.

== Monuments ==
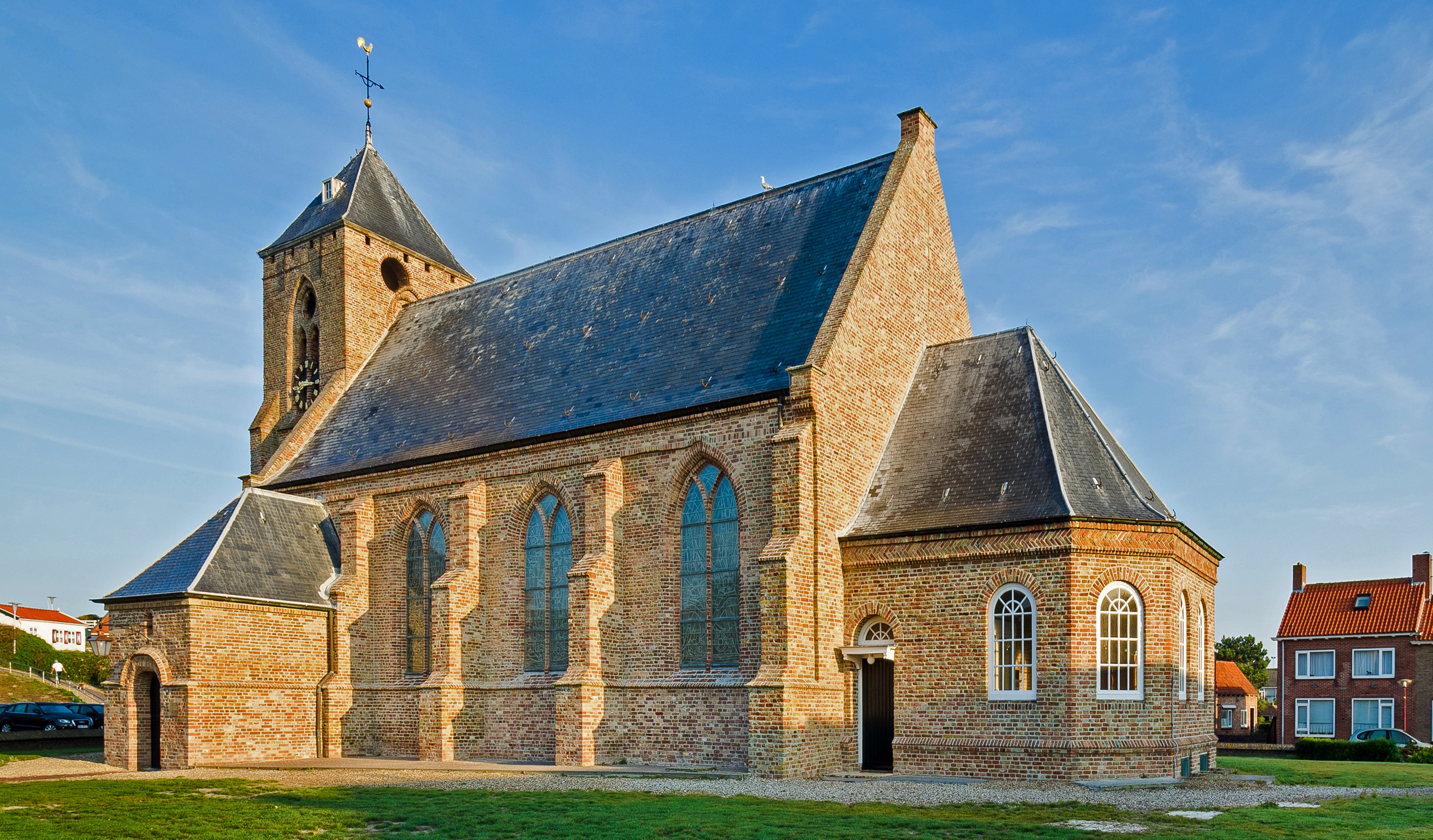
Church of Zoutelande

Zoutelande has several monuments, among them the Dutch Reformed Church with a tower in which fragments of late 13th century brick gothic can be found. In about 1500 the church was formed into a hall church. In 1573 the church was returned to its original state through war damage during the Eighty Years' War. It is estimated that the tower and church got their present shape in about 1738. In 1950 a restoration took place. The parish of the church is connected through legend with Saint Willibrord.

Unfortunately an old monument, the Willibrord Well, was lost due to the building of the present sea dyke. The well, created by Willibrord and dating from the sixteenth century, according to the legend contained healing water. Because of the building of a new dyke in the 1960s, slightly further inland than the old row of dunes, part of the town had to be demolished. This is the reason why the church, which originally stood in the center of the village, is now almost at the foot of the dyke. In 1984 a new well was built to remember the legend.

Zoutelande also has a windmill. It is a round, brick-built corn mill that originates from 1722.
