= Dishoek =

- Neighbourhood
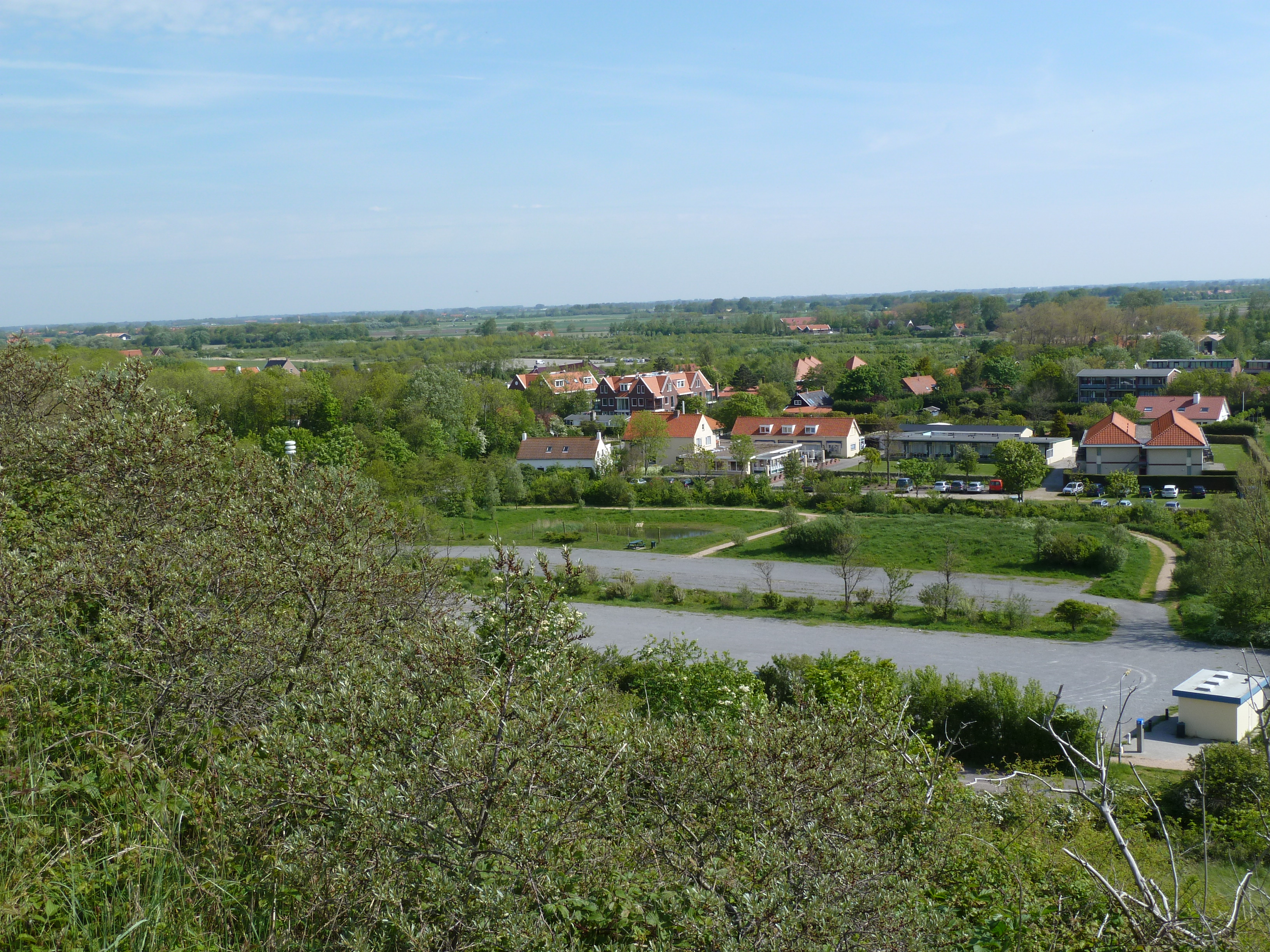
- View on Dishoek

- Location in the province of Zeeland in the Netherlands Dishoek (Netherlands)
- Coordinates: 51°28′17″N 3°31′25″E
- Country: Netherlands
- Province: Zeeland
- Municipality: Veere

Area
  - Total: 0.34 km^{2} (0.13 sq mi)
- Elevation: 2.1 m (6.9 ft)

Population (2021)
  - Total: 150
  - Density: 440/km^{2} (1,100/sq mi)
- Time zone: UTC+1 (CET)
  - Summer (DST): UTC+2 (CEST)
- Postal code: 4371
- Dialing code: 0118
- Website: https://koudekerke-dishoek.nl

Dishoek is a neighbourhood of Koudekerke in the Dutch province of Zeeland. It is a part of the municipality of Veere, and lies about 4 km west of Vlissingen.

The hamlet of Dishoek near Koudekerke became a seaside resort due to its beaches, and contains holiday homes, campsites and hotels.
