= Valkenisse, Walcheren =

Coordinates: 51°29′20″N 3°30′56″E

Valkenisse is a former municipality in the Dutch province of Zeeland, on the peninsula of Walcheren.

Valkenisse was created in 1966 in a merger of Biggekerke, Koudekerke and Zoutelande, and existed until 1997, when it was merged into Veere.

The municipality was named after the two hamlets Groot-Valkenisse and Klein-Valkenisse.
