= List of cities, towns and villages in Zeeland =

This is a list of settlements in the province of Zeeland, in the Netherlands.

Name	Municipality	Coordinates	
Aagtekerke	Veere	51°33′N 3°31′E	
Aardenburg	Sluis	51°16′N 3°27′E	
Abbekinderen	Kapelle	51°29′N 3°55′E	
Absdale	Hulst	51°16′N 4°00′E	
Akkerput	Sluis	51°21′N 3°28′E	
Anna Jacobapolder	Tholen	51°38′N 4°08′E	
Arnemuiden	Middelburg (Z.)	51°30′N 3°40′E	
Axel	Terneuzen	51°16′N 3°55′E	
Baalhoek	Hulst	51°22′N 4°05′E	(VUGA 1997)
Baarland	Borsele	51°25′N 3°53′E	
Baarsdorp	Borsele	51°29′N 3°50′E	
Baken	Schouwen-Duiveland	51°44′N 3°50′E	(VUGA 1997)
Bakendorp	Borsele	51°25′N 3°54′E	
Bakkersdam	Sluis	51°18′N 3°29′E	
Balhofstede	Sluis	51°18′N 3°37′E	
Bath	Reimerswaal	51°24′N 4°13′E	
Beldert	Schouwen-Duiveland	51°41′N 3°59′E	
Biervliet	Terneuzen	51°20′N 3°41′E	
Biezelinge	Kapelle	51°29′N 3°58′E	
Biezen	Sluis	51°15′N 3°28′E	
Biggekerke	Veere	51°30′N 3°32′E	
Blauwewijk	Goes	51°31′N 3°51′E	
Boerengat	Terneuzen	51°20′N 3°47′E	(VUGA 1997)
Boerenhol	Sluis	51°23′N 3°32′E	
Borssele	Borsele	51°25′N 3°44′E	
Botshoofd	Tholen	51°33′N 4°14′E	
Bouchauterhaven	Terneuzen	51°16′N 3°43′E	
Boudewijnskerke	Veere	51°31′N 3°29′E	
Breezand	Veere	51°35′N 3°37′E	
Breskens	Sluis	51°24′N 3°33′E	
Brigdamme	Middelburg (Z.)	51°31′N 3°36′E	(VUGA 1997)
Brijdorpe	Schouwen-Duiveland	51°43′N 3°53′E	
Brouwershaven	Schouwen-Duiveland	51°44′N 3°55′E	
Bruinisse	Schouwen-Duiveland	51°40′N 4°06′E	
Burgh	Schouwen-Duiveland	51°41′N 3°44′E	
Burghsluis	Schouwen-Duiveland	51°41′N 3°45′E	
Buttinge	Veere	51°31′N 3°34′E	
Cadzand	Sluis	51°22′N 3°24′E	
Cadzand-Bad	Sluis	51°23′N 3°23′E	
Clinge	Hulst	51°16′N 4°05′E	
Colijnsplaat	Noord-Beveland	51°36′N 3°51′E	
De Groe	Goes	51°29′N 3°54′E	
De Knol	Terneuzen	51°19′N 3°48′E	(VUGA 1997)
De Muis	Terneuzen	51°14′N 3°54′E	
De Munte	Sluis	51°19′N 3°30′E	
Den Osse	Schouwen-Duiveland	51°44′N 3°54′E	Former hamlet.
De Rand	Tholen	51°33′N 4°07′E	
De Ratte	Terneuzen	51°14′N 3°53′E	
De Sterre	Terneuzen	51°13′N 3°53′E	
Dijkhuisjes	Schouwen-Duiveland	51°43′N 3°57′E	
Dijkwel	Kapelle	51°29′N 3°56′E	
Dishoek	Veere	51°28′N 3°31′E	
Domburg	Veere	51°34′N 3°30′E	
Draaibrug	Sluis	51°18′N 3°26′E	
Dreischor	Schouwen-Duiveland	51°41′N 3°59′E	
Drie Hoefijzers	Hulst	51°15′N 4°00′E	
Drieschouwen	Terneuzen	51°15′N 3°55′E	
Driewegen	Borsele	51°25′N 3°48′E	
Driewegen	Terneuzen	51°21′N 3°39′E	
Duivenhoek	Hulst	51°21′N 4°06′E	
Eede	Sluis	51°15′N 3°27′E	
Eendragt	Terneuzen	51°21′N 3°54′E	(VUGA 1997)
Eindewege	Goes	51°30′N 3°49′E	
Elkerzee	Schouwen-Duiveland	51°44′N 3°51′E	
Ellemeet	Schouwen-Duiveland	51°44′N 3°49′E	
Ellewoutsdijk	Borsele	51°23′N 3°49′E	
Emmadorp	Hulst	51°20′N 4°09′E	
Eversdijk	Kapelle	51°28′N 3°57′E	
Gapinge	Veere	51°33′N 3°38′E	
Gawege	Reimerswaal	51°25′N 4°06′E	
Geersdijk	Noord-Beveland	51°34′N 3°46′E	
Goes	Goes	51°30′N 3°53′E	
Goessche Sas	Goes	51°32′N 3°56′E	Former hamlet. (VUGA 1997)
Graauw	Hulst	51°20′N 4°06′E	
Graszode	Borsele	51°29′N 3°47′E	
Griete	Terneuzen	51°21′N 3°53′E	
Grijpskerke	Veere	51°32′N 3°34′E	
Groede	Sluis	51°23′N 3°30′E	
Groenendijk	Hulst	51°22′N 4°01′E	
Groot-Abeele	Vlissingen	51°28′N 3°37′E	
Groot-Valkenisse	Veere	51°30′N 3°30′E	
Haamstede	Schouwen-Duiveland	51°42′N 3°45′E	
Halfeind	Hulst	51°17′N 4°07′E	
Hansweert	Reimerswaal	51°27′N 4°00′E	
Hasjesstraat	Terneuzen	51°19′N 3°46′E	(VUGA 1997)
Heikant	Hulst	51°15′N 4°01′E	
Heille	Sluis	51°16′N 3°25′E	
Heinkenszand	Borsele	51°28′N 3°49′E	
Hengstdijk	Hulst	51°21′N 4°00′E	
Het Oudeland	Borsele	51°28′N 3°48′E	
Het Oudeland	Tholen	51°31′N 4°12′E	
Hoedekenskerke	Borsele	51°25′N 3°55′E	
Hoek	Terneuzen	51°19′N 3°47′E	
Hoofdplaat	Sluis	51°22′N 3°40′E	
Hoogedijk	Terneuzen	51°20′N 3°46′E	
Hoogeweg	Sluis	51°22′N 3°38′E	
Hulst	Hulst	51°17′N 4°03′E	
IJzendijke	Sluis	51°19′N 3°37′E	
Isabellahaven	Terneuzen	51°17′N 3°43′E	
Kalisbuurt	Tholen	51°34′N 4°12′E	(VUGA 1997)
Kampen	Hulst	51°21′N 3°58′E	
Kamperhoek	Hulst	51°21′N 3°58′E	
Kamperland	Noord-Beveland	51°34′N 3°42′E	
Kapelle	Schouwen-Duiveland	51°39′N 3°58′E	
Kapelle	Kapelle	51°29′N 3°57′E	
Kapellebrug	Hulst	51°15′N 4°04′E	
Kats	Noord-Beveland	51°34′N 3°53′E	
Kattendijke	Goes	51°31′N 3°57′E	
Keizerrijk	Hulst	51°20′N 3°58′E	
Kerkwerve	Schouwen-Duiveland	51°41′N 3°54′E	
Kijkuit	Terneuzen	51°17′N 3°58′E	
Klakbaan	Sluis	51°22′N 3°36′E	Former hamlet. (VUGA 1997)
Klein-Brabant	Sluis	51°19′N 3°31′E	
Klein Mariekerke	Veere	51°31′N 3°32′E	
Klein-Valkenisse	Veere	51°29′N 3°31′E	
Kleverskerke	Middelburg (Z.)	51°31′N 3°40′E	
Kloetinge	Goes	51°30′N 3°55′E	
Kloosterzande	Hulst	51°22′N 4°01′E	
Knaphof	Borsele	51°28′N 3°46′E	
Knuitershoek	Hulst	51°24′N 3°58′E	
Koekoek	Borsele	51°25′N 3°49′E	
Koewacht	Terneuzen	51°14′N 3°58′E	
Koninginnehaven	Sluis	51°19′N 3°43′E	
Kortgene	Noord-Beveland	51°33′N 3°48′E	
Koudekerke	Veere	51°29′N 3°33′E	
Krabbendijke	Reimerswaal	51°26′N 4°07′E	
Krabbenhoek	Hulst	51°18′N 4°06′E	
Kreverhille	Hulst	51°29′N 3°59′E	
Krommenhoeke	Veere	51°31′N 3°32′E	
Kruiningen	Reimerswaal	51°27′N 4°02′E	
Kruisdijk	Sluis	51°23′N 3°33′E	
Kruisdorp	Hulst	51°22′N 4°02′E	
Kruishoofd	Sluis	51°23′N 3°28′E	Former hamlet. (VUGA 1997)
Kruispolderhaven	Hulst	51°21′N 4°06′E	
Kuitaart	Hulst	51°21′N 4°02′E	
Kwadendamme	Borsele	51°26′N 3°53′E	
Kwakkel	Terneuzen	51°20′N 3°56′E	
Lammerenburg	Vlissingen	51°28′N 3°34′E	(VUGA 1997)
Lamswaarde	Hulst	51°21′N 4°03′E	
Langeweegje	Borsele	51°26′N 3°53′E	
Lewedorp	Borsele	51°30′N 3°45′E	
Looperskapelle	Schouwen-Duiveland	51°44′N 3°52′E	
Luntershoek	Hulst	51°18′N 3°59′E	
Maagd van Gent	Sluis	51°17′N 3°41′E	
Maaidijk	Sluis	51°20′N 3°30′E	
Maalstede	Kapelle	51°29′N 3°58′E	
Magrette	Terneuzen	51°17′N 3°54′E	
Malland	Tholen	51°34′N 4°06′E	
Marolleput	Sluis	51°21′N 3°29′E	
Mauritsfort	Terneuzen	51°18′N 3°47′E	
Meliskerke	Veere	51°31′N 3°31′E	
Middelburg	Middelburg (Z.)	51°30′N 3°37′E	
Moershoofde	Sluis	51°15′N 3°31′E	
Molembaix	Veere	51°33′N 3°34′E	
Molenhoek	Hulst	51°19′N 4°03′E	
Molentje	Sluis	51°21′N 3°35′E	Former hamlet. (VUGA 1997
Molenvliet	Tholen	51°32′N 4°12′E	
Monnikendijk	Goes	51°30′N 3°57′E	
Moriaanshoofd	Schouwen-Duiveland	51°41′N 3°51′E	
Mosselhoek	Tholen	51°31′N 4°12′E	
Nieuw-Abeele	Middelburg (Z.)	51°29′N 3°36′E	(VUGA 1997)
Nieuwdorp	Borsele	51°28′N 3°44′E	
Nieuwemolen	Terneuzen	51°14′N 3°56′E	
Nieuw- en Sint Joosland	Middelburg (Z.)	51°29′N 3°39′E	
Nieuwerkerk	Schouwen-Duiveland	51°39′N 4°00′E	
Nieuwerkerke	Schouwen-Duiveland	51°42′N 3°53′E	
Nieuwesluis	Sluis	51°24′N 3°30′E	
Nieuw-Haamstede	Schouwen-Duiveland	51°43′N 3°42′E	
Nieuwland	Middelburg (Z.)	51°29′N 3°39′E	Now part of Nieuw- en Sint-Joosland
Nieuwland	Sluis	51°20′N 3°38′E	
Nieuwlandsche Molen	Terneuzen	51°20′N 3°40′E	
Nieuw-Namen	Hulst	51°18′N 4°10′E	
Nieuwvliet	Sluis	51°22′N 3°28′E	
Nieuwvliet-Bad	Sluis	51°23′N 3°27′E	
Nisse	Borsele	51°27′N 3°51′E	
Noordeinde	Goes	51°30′N 3°55′E	
Noordgouwe	Schouwen-Duiveland	51°42′N 3°56′E	
Noordstraat	Hulst	51°23′N 4°01′E	
Noordwelle	Schouwen-Duiveland	51°43′N 3°48′E	
Nummer Een	Sluis	51°23′N 3°36′E	
Onder de Molen	Tholen	51°34′N 4°12′E	
Oostburg	Sluis	51°20′N 3°29′E	
Oostburgsche Brug	Sluis	51°20′N 3°28′E	
Oostdijk	Reimerswaal	51°27′N 4°05′E	
Oosterland	Schouwen-Duiveland	51°39′N 4°02′E	
Oostkapelle	Veere	51°34′N 3°33′E	
Oost-Souburg	Vlissingen	51°28′N 3°36′E	
Ossenisse	Hulst	51°23′N 3°59′E	
Oudedorp	Middelburg (Z.)	51°28′N 3°40′E	
Oudeland	Sluis	51°20′N 3°36′E	
Oudelande	Borsele	51°24′N 3°51′E	
Oude Polder	Terneuzen	51°13′N 3°52′E	
Oude Stoof	Hulst	51°21′N 3°59′E	
Oud-Sabbinge	Goes	51°32′N 3°48′E	
Oud-Vossemeer	Tholen	51°34′N 4°12′E	
Ouwerkerk	Schouwen-Duiveland	51°38′N 3°59′E	
Overslag	Terneuzen	51°12′N 3°53′E	
Ovezande	Borsele	51°26′N 3°49′E	
Paal	Hulst	51°21′N 4°06′E	
Paradijs	Terneuzen	51°20′N 3°46′E	(VUGA 1997)
Passluis	Terneuzen	51°14′N 3°49′E	
Patrijzenhoek	Hulst	51°18′N 4°02′E	
Pauluspolder	Hulst	51°20′N 4°01′E	
Philippine	Terneuzen	51°17′N 3°46′E	
Plakkebord	Sluis	51°18′N 3°33′E	
Plankendorp	Noord-Beveland	51°34′N 3°43′E	Former hamlet. (VUGA 1997
Planketent	Goes	51°30′N 3°50′E	
Ponte	Sluis	51°19′N 3°37′E	
Ponte-Avancé	Sluis	51°18′N 3°38′E	
Poonhaven	Terneuzen	51°20′N 3°57′E	
Poortvliet	Tholen	51°33′N 4°09′E	
Poppendamme	Veere	51°31′N 3°33′E	
Posthoorn	Terneuzen	51°16′N 3°45′E	
Prosperdorp	Hulst	51°19′N 4°12′E	
Pyramide	Sluis	51°18′N 3°40′E	
Reedijk	Terneuzen	51°14′N 3°50′E	Former hamlet. (VUGA 1997
Renesse	Schouwen-Duiveland	51°44′N 3°46′E	
Retranchement	Sluis	51°21′N 3°23′E	
Reuzenhoek	Terneuzen	51°20′N 3°55′E	
Rijkebuurt	Borsele	51°28′N 3°47′E	
Rilland	Reimerswaal	51°25′N 4°11′E	
Ritthem	Vlissingen	51°27′N 3°38′E	
Rode Sluis	Terneuzen	51°13′N 3°55′E	
Roelshoek	Reimerswaal	51°26′N 4°08′E	
Roodenhoek	Sluis	51°22′N 3°38′E	
Roodewijk	Goes	51°32′N 3°52′E	
Roverberg	Hulst	51°20′N 4°04′E	
Ruischendegat	Hulst	51°20′N 3°58′E	
Sasput	Sluis	51°22′N 3°36′E	
Sas van Gent	Terneuzen	51°14′N 3°48′E	
Schapenbout	Terneuzen	51°17′N 3°53′E	
Schapershoek	Hulst	51°20′N 3°58′E	
Scharendijke	Schouwen-Duiveland	51°44′N 3°51′E	
Scheldevaartshoek	Hulst	51°19′N 4°05′E	
Schellach	Veere	51°31′N 3°39′E	
Scherpbier	Sluis	51°21′N 3°30′E	
Scherpenisse	Tholen	51°33′N 4°06′E	
Schoondijke	Sluis	51°21′N 3°33′E	
Schoondorp	Tholen	51°32′N 4°09′E	
Schore	Kapelle	51°28′N 4°00′E	
Schorebrug	Reimerswaal	51°28′N 4°01′E	
Schuddebeurs	Hulst	51°18′N 4°04′E	
Schuddebeurs	Schouwen-Duiveland	51°40′N 3°57′E	
Separatiedijk	Reimerswaal	51°26′N 4°12′E	Former hamlet. (VUGA 1997
Serooskerke	Schouwen-Duiveland	51°42′N 3°49′E	
Serooskerke	Veere	51°33′N 3°36′E	
's-Gravenpolder	Borsele	51°28′N 3°54′E	
's-Heer Abtskerke	Borsele	51°28′N 3°53′E	
's-Heer Arendskerke	Goes	51°29′N 3°49′E	
's-Heerenhoek	Borsele	51°27′N 3°46′E	
's-Heer Hendrikskinderen	Goes	51°30′N 3°52′E	
Sinoutskerke	Borsele	51°28′N 3°52′E	
Sint Annaland	Tholen	51°36′N 4°06′E	
Sint Anna ter Muiden	Sluis	51°19′N 3°22′E	
Sint Janskerke	Veere	51°31′N 3°30′E	
Sint Jansteen	Hulst	51°16′N 4°03′E	
Sint Kruis	Sluis	51°16′N 3°30′E	
Sint Laurens	Middelburg (Z.)	51°32′N 3°36′E	
Sint Maartensdijk	Tholen	51°33′N 4°05′E	
Sint Philipsland	Tholen	51°37′N 4°10′E	
Sirjansland	Schouwen-Duiveland	51°41′N 4°02′E	
Slijkplaat	Sluis	51°23′N 3°36′E	
Slikkenburg	Sluis	51°20′N 3°26′E	
Sluis	Tholen	51°38′N 4°06′E	
Sluis	Sluis	51°19′N 3°23′E	
Sluis De Piet	Goes	51°31′N 3°45′E	
Sluiskil	Terneuzen	51°17′N 3°50′E	
Smedekensbrugge	Sluis	51°16′N 3°27′E	
Spui	Terneuzen	51°18′N 3°53′E	
Statenboom	Hulst	51°17′N 4°07′E	
Stationsbuurt	Reimerswaal	51°25′N 4°10′E	
Stavenisse	Tholen	51°35′N 4°01′E	
Steenenkruis	Tholen	51°32′N 4°12′E	
Steenhoven	Sluis	51°20′N 3°32′E	
Steenovens	Terneuzen	51°18′N 3°55′E	
Stoppeldijkveer	Hulst	51°19′N 3°57′E	
Strijenham	Tholen	51°31′N 4°09′E	
Stroodorp	Noord-Beveland	51°34′N 3°44′E	
Stroodorpe	Terneuzen	51°16′N 3°50′E	(VUGA 1997)
Strooienstad	Hulst	51°22′N 3°59′E	
Stroopuit	Sluis	51°18′N 3°34′E	
Tasdijk	Hulst	51°21′N 4°01′E	
Terhofstede	Sluis	51°20′N 3°24′E	
Ter Hole	Hulst	51°19′N 4°02′E	
Terneuzen	Terneuzen	51°20′N 3°50′E	
Tervaten	Goes	51°30′N 3°55′E	
't Hoekje	Hulst	51°15′N 4°02′E	(VUGA 1997)
Tholen	Tholen	51°32′N 4°13′E	
't Jagertje	Hulst	51°18′N 4°04′E	
Tragel	Sluis	51°21′N 3°32′E	
Turkeye	Sluis	51°19′N 3°35′E	
't Vlaandertje	Borsele	51°27′N 3°48′E	
Vaartwijk	Terneuzen	51°17′N 3°54′E	
Val	Terneuzen	51°20′N 3°54′E	
Valeiskreek	Sluis	51°15′N 3°29′E	
Veere	Veere	51°33′N 3°40′E	
Veldzicht	Sluis	51°21′N 3°32′E	
Veldzicht	Sluis	51°18′N 3°38′E	
Vianen	Schouwen-Duiveland	51°37′N 4°00′E	Former hamlet. (VUGA 1997
Vijfhoek	Hulst	51°18′N 4°00′E	
Vlake	Reimerswaal	51°28′N 4°01′E	
Vlissingen	Vlissingen	51°27′N 3°34′E	
Vogelfort	Hulst	51°20′N 3°59′E	
Vogelwaarde	Hulst	51°19′N 3°58′E	
Völckerdorp	Reimerswaal	51°26′N 4°15′E	
Vrouwenpolder	Veere	51°35′N 3°37′E	
Vuilpan	Sluis	51°15′N 3°30′E	
Waanskinderen	Goes	51°30′N 3°56′E	
Waarde	Reimerswaal	51°25′N 4°04′E	
Walsoorden	Hulst	51°23′N 4°02′E	
Waterlandkerkje	Sluis	51°19′N 3°33′E	
Wemeldinge	Kapelle	51°31′N 4°00′E	
Werendijke	Veere	51°30′N 3°30′E	
Westdorpe	Terneuzen	51°14′N 3°50′E	
Westenschouwen	Schouwen-Duiveland	51°41′N 3°43′E	
Westhoek	Veere	51°28′N 3°33′E	Former hamlet. (VUGA 1997
Westkapelle	Veere	51°32′N 3°26′E	
Westkerke	Tholen	51°32′N 4°06′E	
West-Souburg	Vlissingen	51°28′N 3°35′E	(VUGA 1997)
Wilhelminadorp	Goes	51°32′N 3°54′E	
Wissekerke	Goes	51°30′N 3°51′E	
Wissenkerke	Noord-Beveland	51°35′N 3°45′E	
Wolphaartsdijk	Goes	51°32′N 3°49′E	
Wulpenbek	Terneuzen	51°19′N 3°49′E	
Yerseke	Reimerswaal	51°30′N 4°03′E	
Yersekendam	Reimerswaal	51°30′N 4°02′E	Former hamlet. (VUGA 1997
Zaamslag	Terneuzen	51°19′N 3°55′E	
Zaamslagveer	Terneuzen	51°19′N 3°56′E	
Zandberg	Hulst	51°18′N 4°06′E	
Zandplaat	Terneuzen	51°18′N 3°47′E	
Zandstraat	Terneuzen	51°16′N 3°49′E	
Zeedorp	Hulst	51°23′N 3°58′E	
Zeegat	Hulst	51°17′N 4°06′E	
Zierikzee	Schouwen-Duiveland	51°39′N 3°55′E	
Zijpe	Schouwen-Duiveland	51°39′N 4°06′E	Former hamlet. (VUGA 1997
Zonnemaire	Schouwen-Duiveland	51°43′N 3°57′E	
Zoutelande	Veere	51°30′N 3°29′E	
Zuiddorpe	Terneuzen	51°14′N 3°54′E	
Zuidzande	Sluis	51°20′N 3°27′E	
