= Rengerskerke en Zuidland =

Coordinates: 51°40′9″N 3°52′10″E

Rengerskerke en Zuidland is a former municipality in the Dutch province of Zeeland. It existed until 1813, when it was merged with Kerkwerve.

The municipality consisted of two domains, Rengerskerke and Zuidland. Rengerskerke used to be a village about 3 km northwest of Zierikzee, until it was destroyed by a flood in 1662. Zuidland was a polder with a number of villages: Simonskerke, Zuidkerke, Brieskerke, Sint Jacobskerke and the hamlet of 's Heer-Arentshaven. All of the villages were destroyed by floods in the 16th century. In the 19th century, the remaining part of Rengerskerke and Zuidland had a population of only 120.
