= Schouwen-Duiveland =

- Municipality
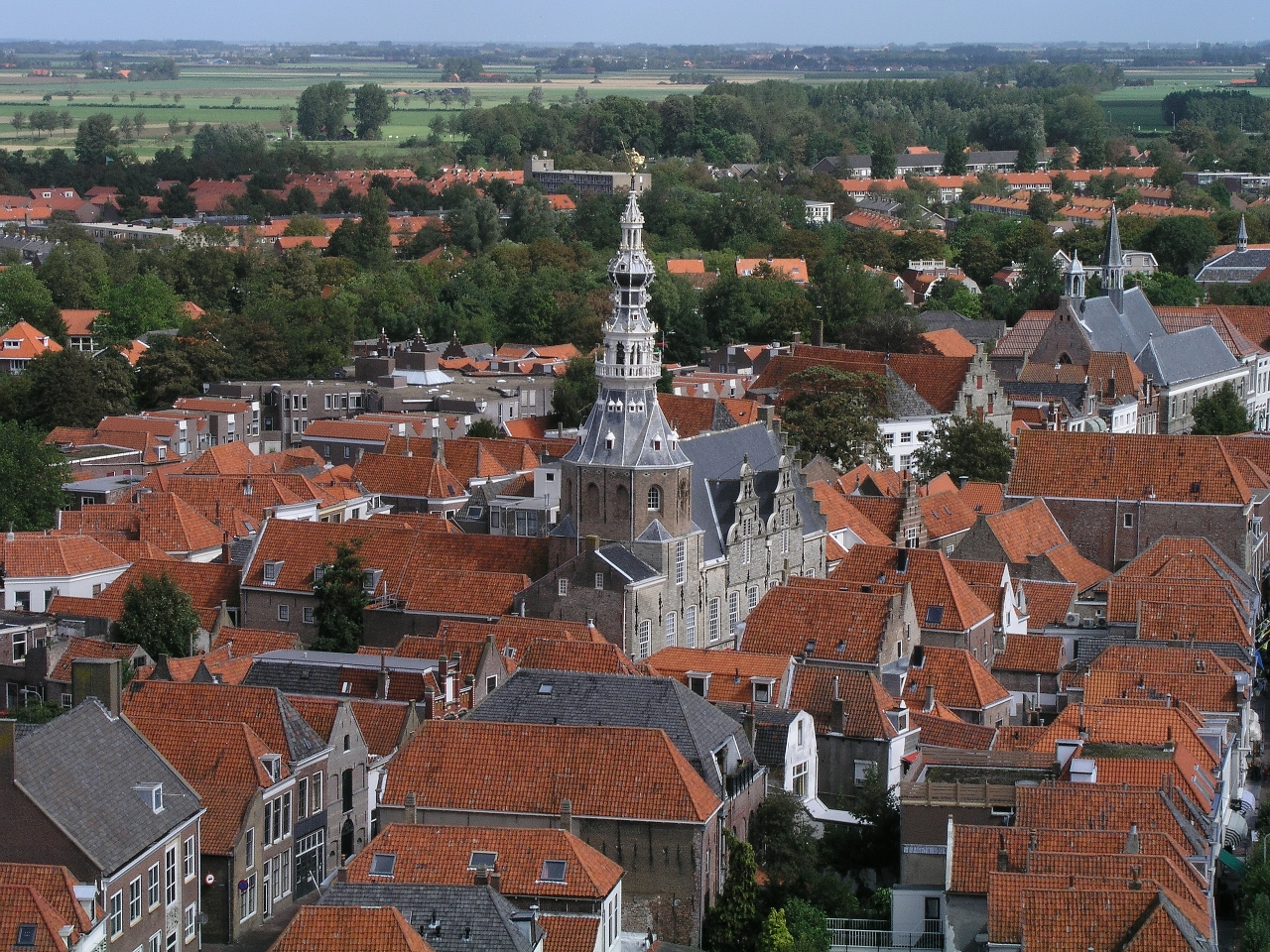
- Zierikzee city centre

- Flag Coat of arms

- Location in Zeeland
- Coordinates: 51°39′N 3°55′E
- Country: Netherlands
- Province: Zeeland
- Established: 1 January 1997

Government
  - Body: Municipal council
  - Mayor: Jack van der Hoek

Area
  - Total: 488.21 km^{2} (188.50 sq mi)
  - Land: 229.65 km^{2} (88.67 sq mi)
  - Water: 258.56 km^{2} (99.83 sq mi)
- Elevation: 0 m (0 ft)

Population (January 2021)
  - Total: 34,065
  - Density: 148/km^{2} (380/sq mi)
- Time zone: UTC+1 (CET)
  - Summer (DST): UTC+2 (CEST)
- Postcode: 4300–4329
- Area code: 0111
- Website: schouwen-duiveland.nl

Schouwen-Duiveland (Dutch pronunciation: [ˌsxʌu.ə(n) ˈdœyvəlɑnt]) is a municipality and an island in the southwestern Netherlands province of Zeeland. The municipality has 33,737 inhabitants (1 January 2016) and covers an area of 488.94 square kilometres (188.78 square miles) (of which 257.87 square kilometres (99.56 square miles) is water).

The northside of the island has two fixed connections to Goeree-Overflakkee, the Brouwersdam and the Grevelingen. The southside has two fixed connections to cross the Oosterschelde to North Beveland, the Stormvloed Kering or Oosterscheldedam, part of the Delta Works and the Zeeland Bridge. The island is mostly flat and is, besides a small area, below the sea level. On the western tip is a dune whose highest point is about 42 meters above sea level. The island is, in the summer, very popular with (German) tourists. The Renesse area is a popular holiday destination for young people.

The Brouwersdam is a dam, part of the Delta Works, from Schouwen-Duiveland to Goedereede, the west part of the island of Goeree-Overflakkee in South Holland.

== History ==
The island of Schouwen-Duiveland originally consisted of four islands: Schouwen, Duiveland, Dreischor, and Bommenede. Over the centuries it has been developed by both man and nature. The dam between Schouwen and Duiveland dates from 1610.

On 30 April 1900 the Rotterdam Tramway Company opened a steam tram line on the island running as public transport until 1 February 1953.

During the Second World War, Schouwen-Duiveland was the only Zeelandic island that remained under German occupation until May 1945. In December 1944, the Germans had declared their intent to deport all local men aged between 17 and 40. The local resistance fighters made plans to sabotage this by stealing all the registers on the island with the help of nearby Allies, who were preparing to liberate the island. However, ten local men were arrested and subsequently executed.

The North Sea flood of 1953 inundated large portions of the island and caused heavy damage. The island's steam tram line permanently ceased service, and was replaced by a bus line.

After the completion of the Brouwersdam in 1972 the island became a center of water sports. Surfing, sailing and diving are common activities on the North Sea beaches and the Grevelingenmeer.

== Geography ==
=== Topography ===
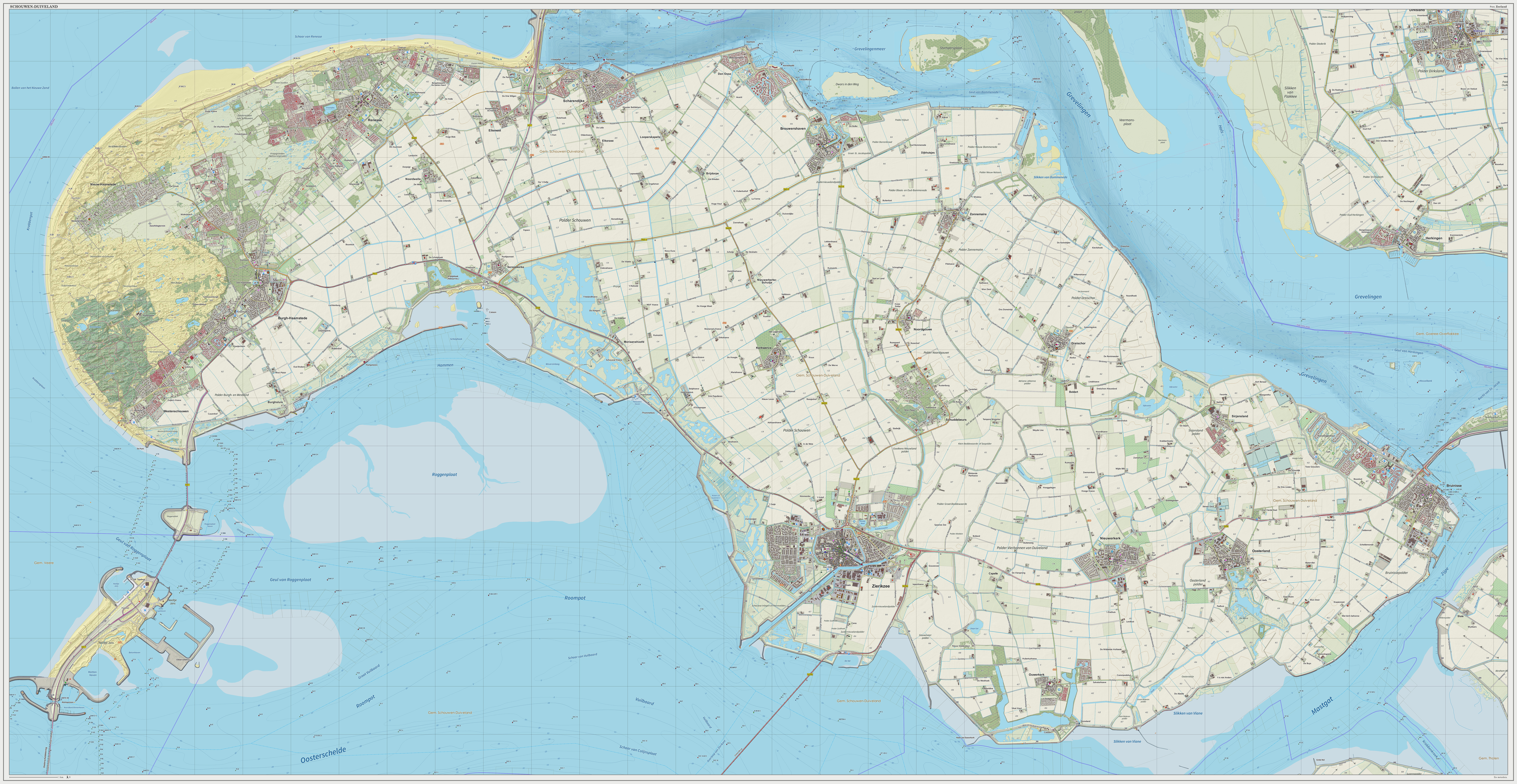
Map of the island of Schouwen-Duiveland, Sept 2014

=== Demography ===
The main population centres are listed in the tables below (as of 2021).

Zierikzee	11,630
Burgh-Haamstede	4,310
Bruinisse	3,775
Nieuwerkerk	2,720
Oosterland	2,310
Renesse	1,500
Brouwershaven	1,250
Scharendijke	1,260
Kerkwerve	990

Dreischor	975
Noordgouwe	790
Zonnemaire	755
Ouwerkerk	575
Sirjansland	345
Ellemeet	355
Noordwelle	310
Serooskerke	265

There are two places in Schouwen-Duiveland, Zierikzee and Brouwershaven, which in the past had gained city rights. Then there are the hamlets Looperskapelle, Moriaanshoofd, Nieuwerkerk, Nieuwerkerke, Schuddebeurs, Westenschouwen, Zierikzee, Beldert, Brijdorpe, Burghsluis, Capelle, Elkerzee and Nieuw-Haamstede. The town hall is in Zierikzee.

There is no village called Schouwen-Duiveland; the municipality takes its name from the island, which received its name when the former islands Schouwen and Duiveland (and Dreischor) were poldered together.

== Nature in Schouwen-Duiveland ==
A large number of nature reserves can be found on Schouwen-Duiveland. They are usually managed by Staatsbosbeheer. Most nature reserves are accessible to visitors. The areas are particularly suitable for bird watchers and cyclists. In the nature of Schouwen Duiveland, European special species such as avocet, curlew and plover can be found. Boswachterij Westerschouwen is the largest forest in the province of Zeeland. In addition to the nature in and around the Grevelingenmeer, the following nature reserves can be found on Schouwen-Duiveland:

- Boswachterij Westerschouwen (Westenshouwen Forest)
- Kop van Schouwen
- Slikken van Dijkwater
- Dorpsbos Sirjansland (Sirjansland Village Forest)
- Duinzoom
- Gadra
- Kakkersweel (Small lake between Kerkwerve & Noordgouwe)
- Karolingische Burcht
- Krekengebied Ouwerkerk
- Meeuwenduinen
- Naterskreek
- Plan Tureluur (Redshank reserve)
- Prunje
- Schelphoek (Wetland on site of former hamlet near Serooskerke)
- Schouwse Dijkbeemden
- Schuddebeurs (natuurgebied)
- De Steenzwaan (The Stone Swan - creek/wetlands near Nieuwerkerk)
- Vliegveld (natuurgebied)
- Vroongronden
- Zoeten en Zouten Haard

== Governance ==
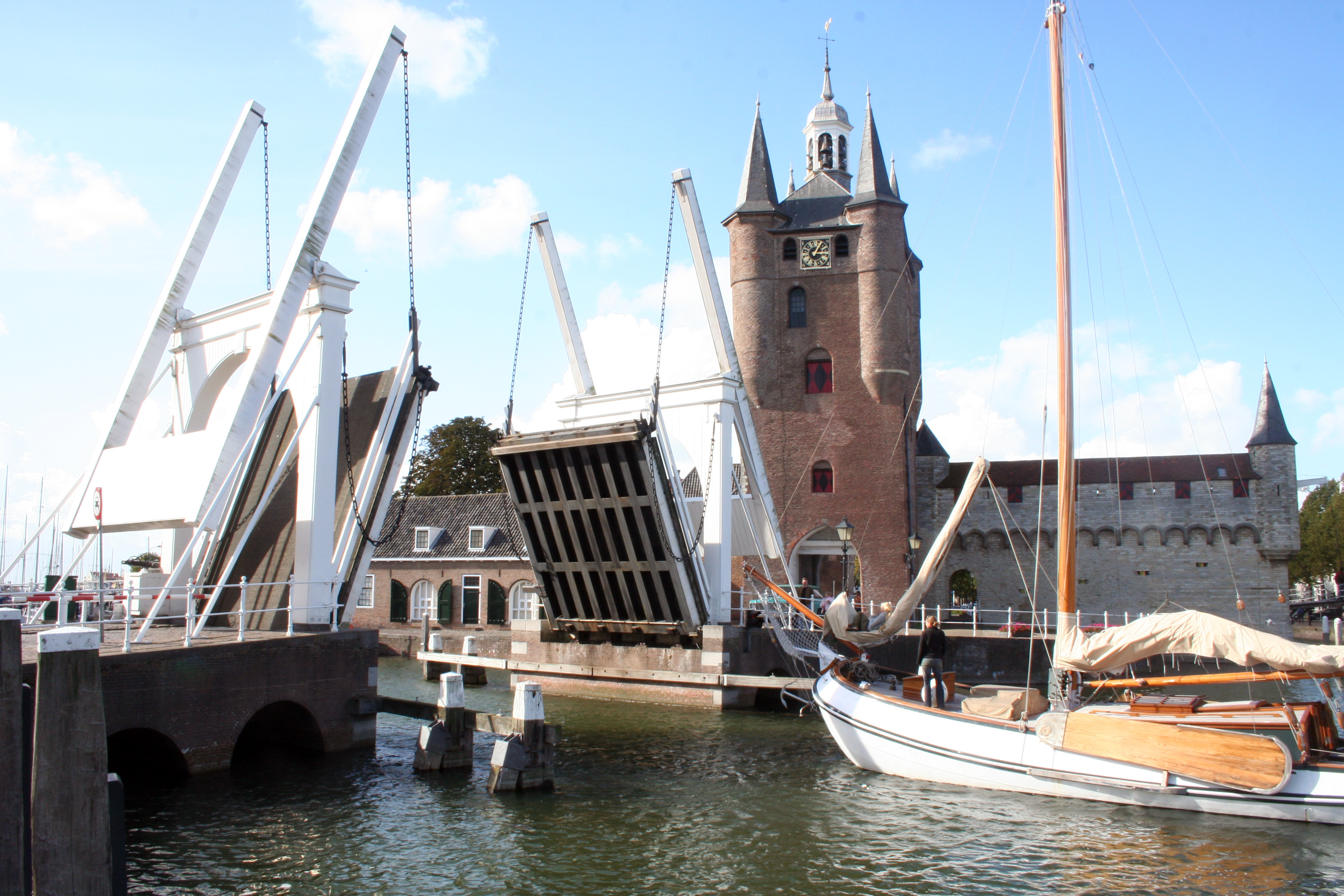
Lift bridge in Zierikzee

The municipality of Schouwen-Duiveland on 1 January 1997 came about after six municipalities were merged. These municipalities were Brouwershaven, Bruinisse, Duiveland, Middenschouwen, Westerschouwen and Zierikzee . These six municipalities were created on 1 January 1961 from a previous reclassification.

=== Municipal council ===
The council of Schouwen-Duiveland consists of 23 seats. Below is the composition of the council since 1997:

Partij	1997¹	2002	2006	2010	2014	2018	2022	2026
Leefbaar Schouwen-Duiveland	-	4	3	4	5	6 (8)	6	6
VVD	7	4	4	5	4	3 (2)	3	5
SGP	3	2	2	3	3	3	3	3
CDA	4	4	4	3	3	3 (4)	3	3
GroenLinks / PvdA (PRO)	-	-	-	-	-	-	-	2
D66	2	-	-	1	1	1	1	2
ChristenUnie	2	2	2	2	2	1 (0)	1	1
SP	-	-	-	-	2	2	1	1
PvdA	4	3	5	2	2	1	2	*
GroenLinks	1	1	1	1	-	-	-	*
Total	23	23	23	23	23	23	23	23

On 13 November 1996 ¹ reclassification elections were held. The first council was launched on 1 January 1997.
Explanations for the bracketed number of councillors for some parties between the 2018 and 2022 elections are below:

- A councilor of the VVD left the party in 2018 and joined Leefbaar Schouwen-Duiveland in 2019.
- A councilor of the ChristenUnie left the party in 2019 and joined the CDA
- A councilor of GroenLinks left the party in 2018 and continued under the name "Lijst Jet van Gent"
- "List Jet van Gent/ Hart voor Schouwen-Duiveland" merged with Leefbaar Schouwen-Duiveland in 2021"

* 2026: Joint list for GroenLinks and PvdA

=== Mayor & Aldermen ===
- Mayor Jack van der Hoek (None)
- Alderman Jacqueline Burg (Leefbaar SD)
- Alderman J.G. Smit, (PRO)
- Alderman G.R.J. van Heukelom (SGP)
- Alderman A.A. ten Cate (CDA)

== Culture ==
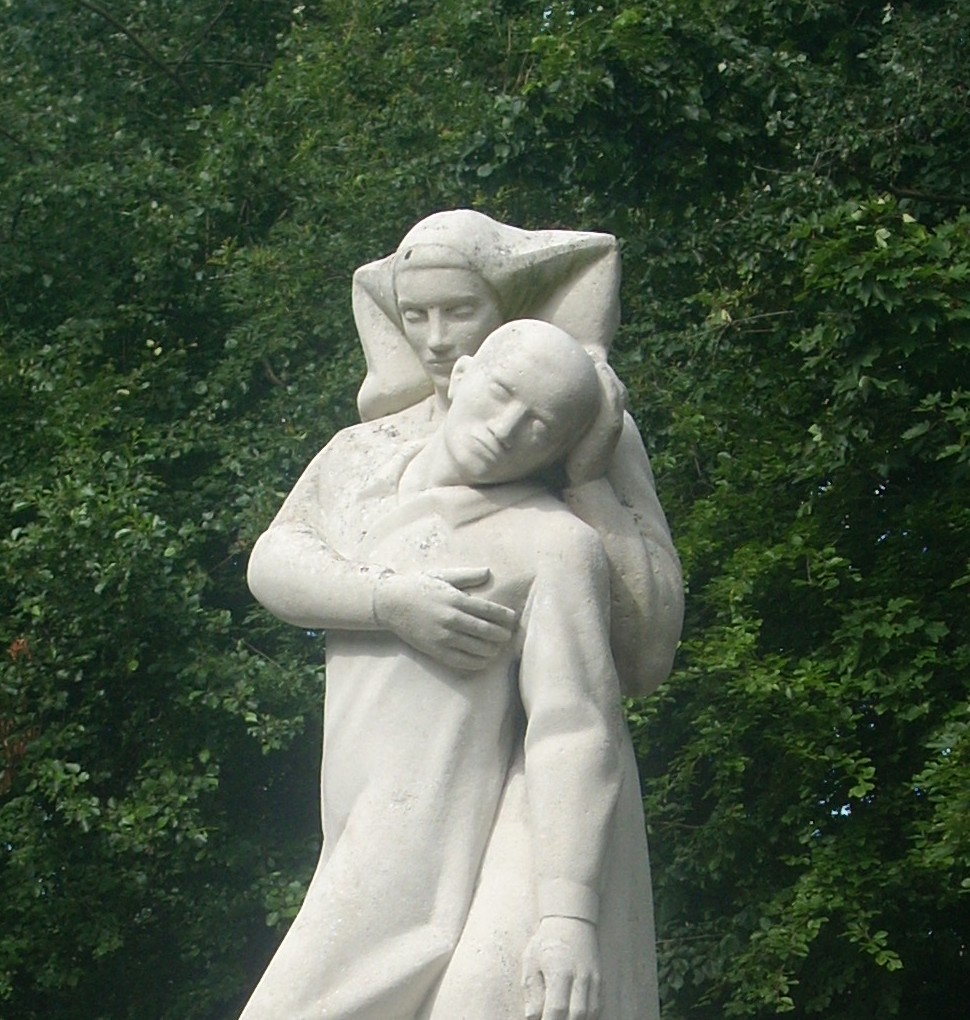
Renesse World War II and Occupation Victims Memorial

There are a number of national monuments in the municipality, including the war memorial at Oude Moolweg in Renesse and the Jewish Memorial on Caustraat in Zierikzee. The war memorial commemorates in particular the ten local resistance fighters executed by the Germans on 10 December 1944. It also commemorates all local citizens who died during the Second World War and the Police Actions in the Dutch East Indies.

The Westenschouwen mermaid was the main character in a saga set in Zeeland, relating to the village of Westenschouwen on the island. The saga predicts the decline and demise of this once prosperous village, with only the tower remaining. After the tower was demolished in 1845, the Plompe Tower was seen as the remaining tower of Westenschouwen. Plompe Tower is open to tourists and when the door of the tower is opened, the story of the mermaid is played automatically via a carousel. The mermaid is celebrated in the local coat of arms.

== Notable residents ==
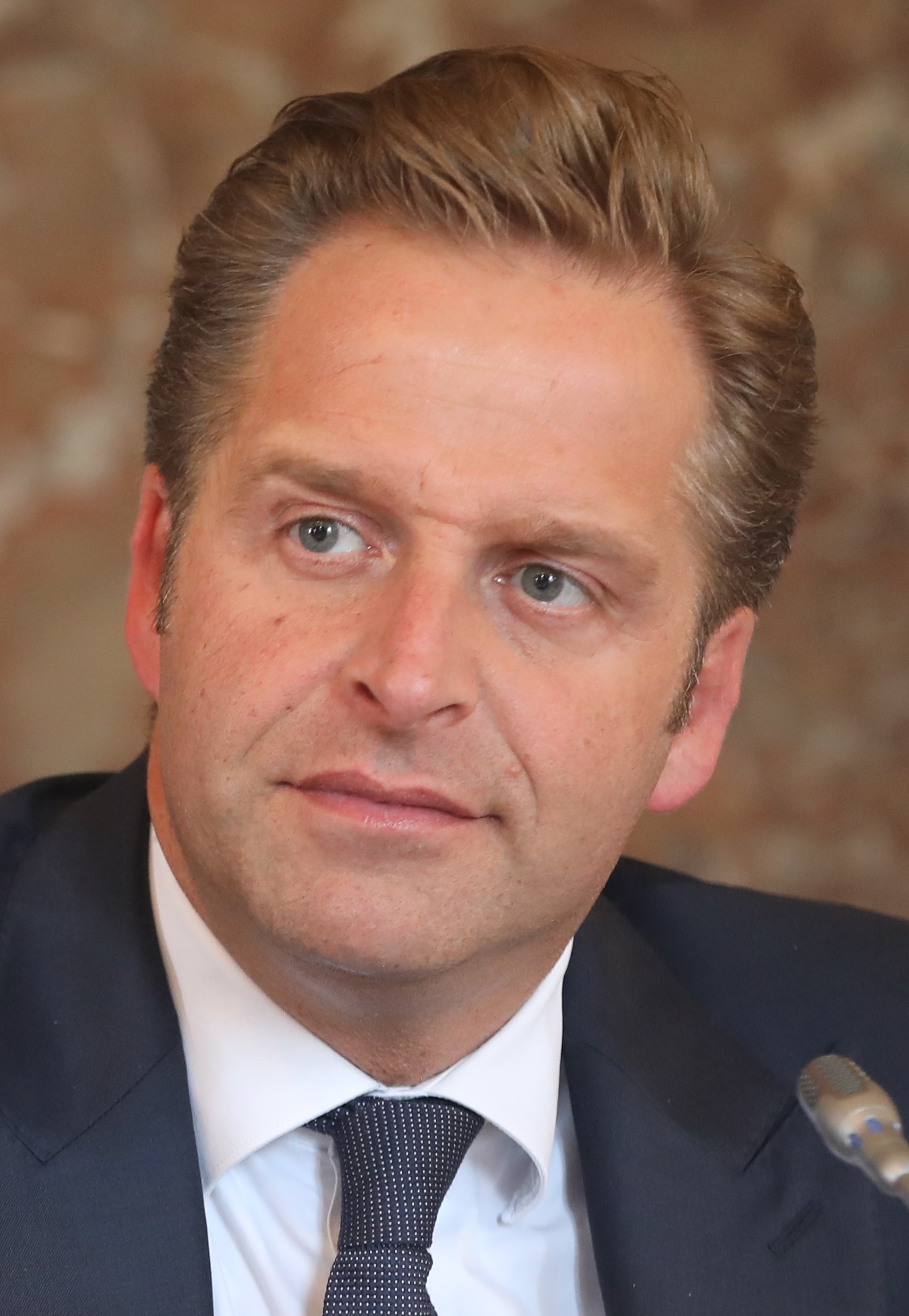
Hugo de Jonge, 2019

=== Public thinking & public service ===
- John III, Lord of Renesse (1249–1304) Zeeland nobleman and warrior
- Cornelius van Zierikzee (ca.1405 n Zierikzee – 1462) a Dutch priest, worked in Scotland
- Petrus Peckius the Elder (1529 in Zierikzee – 1589) jurist, wrote about maritime law
- Bonifacius de Jonge (1567 in Zierikzee – 1625) was Grand pensionary of Zeeland 1615-1625
- Joost Berman (1793 in Ouwerkerk – 1855) lawyer, judge, politician, poet, writer and editor
- Alexander Johan Berman (1828 in Zierikzee – 1886) the Dutch Reformed minister of Watergang
- Anton Constandse (1899 in Brouwershaven – 1983) an anarchist, author and journalist
- George van Heukelom (1949 – 2023) a politician
- Leen van Dijke (born 1955 in Oosterland) a retired politician
- Hugo de Jonge (born 1977 in Bruinisse) a politician and Deputy Prime Minister
- Rutger Bregman (born 1988 in Westerschouwen) a popular historian and author

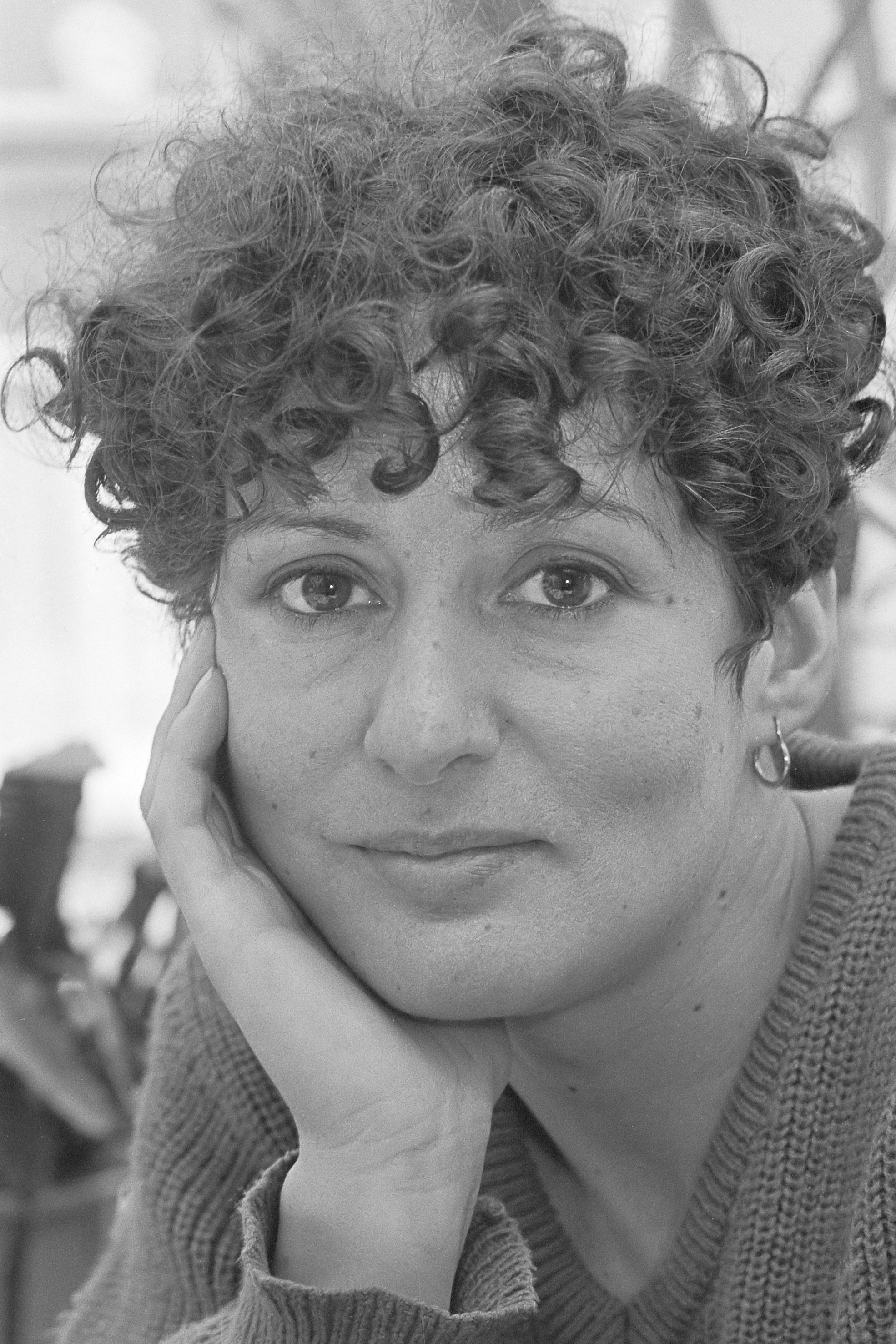
Digna Sinke, 1984

=== The arts ===
- Jacob Cats (1577 in Brouwershaven – 1660) a poet, humorist, jurist and politician, famous for his emblem books
- Charles Hofmann (1763 – 1823 in Zierikzee) a musician and composer
- Henry Van der Weyde (1838 in Zierikzee – 1924) Dutch-born English painter and photographer
- Leonard Ochtman (1854 in Zonnemaire – 1935) a Dutch-American Impressionist painter
- Digna Sinke (born 1949 in Zonnemaire) a film director, producer and screenwriter
- Jan van den Bosch (born 1950) TV presenter on RTL5
- Ester Naomi Perquin (born 1980) a poet, brought up in Zierikzee

=== Science & business ===
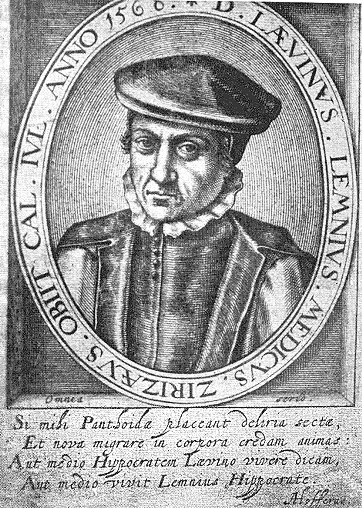
Levinus Lemnius, 1568

- Jacob Bellaert (born in Zierikzee) an early publisher of 17 books in Haarlem from 1483–1486
- Levinus Lemnius (1505 in Zierikzee – 1568 in Zierikzee) a physician and author
- Johannes Cornelis de Jonge (1793 in Zierikzee – 1853) Chief Archivist of the Dutch National Archives
- Johannes van de Velde Olivier (1795 in Serooskerke – 1845) a publisher, printer, bookbinder and bookseller
- Pieter de Looze (1811–1881) newspaper publisher, founded the Zierikzeesche Nieuwsbode
- Pieter Zeeman (1865 in Zonnemaire – 1943) a physicist who shared the 1902 Nobel Prize in Physics for their discovery of the Zeeman effect

=== Sport ===
- Adrie Koster (born 1954 in Zierikzee) a football manager
- Nelli Cooman (born 1964) 60 metres two-time World indoor champion, six-time European indoor champion and former world record holder. Lives in Nieuwerkerk

== Gallery ==
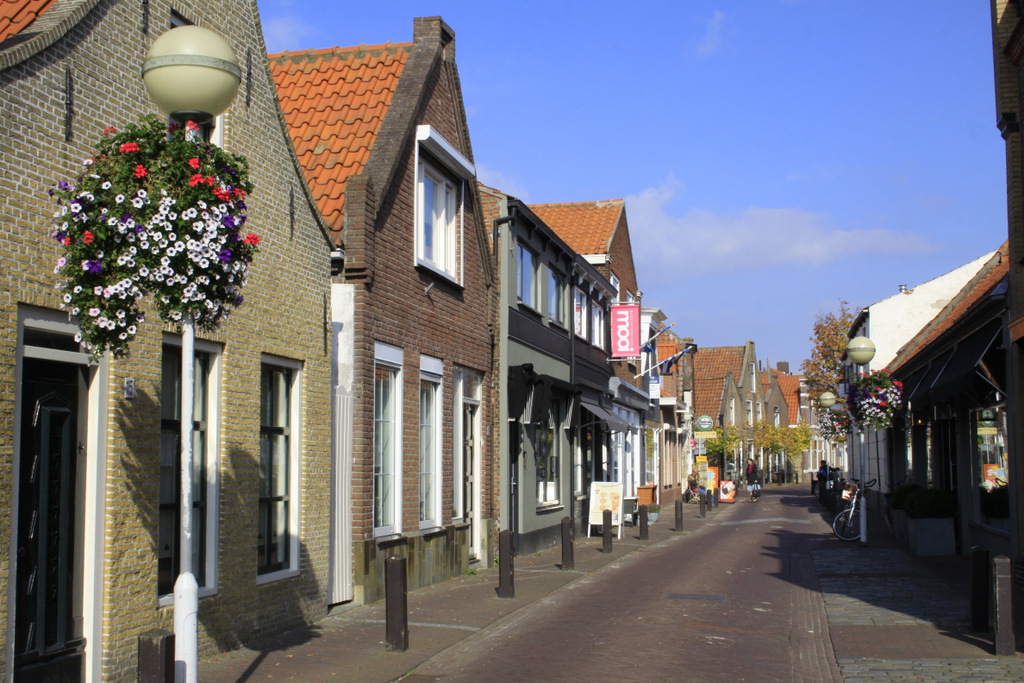
Street in the fishing village of Buinisse

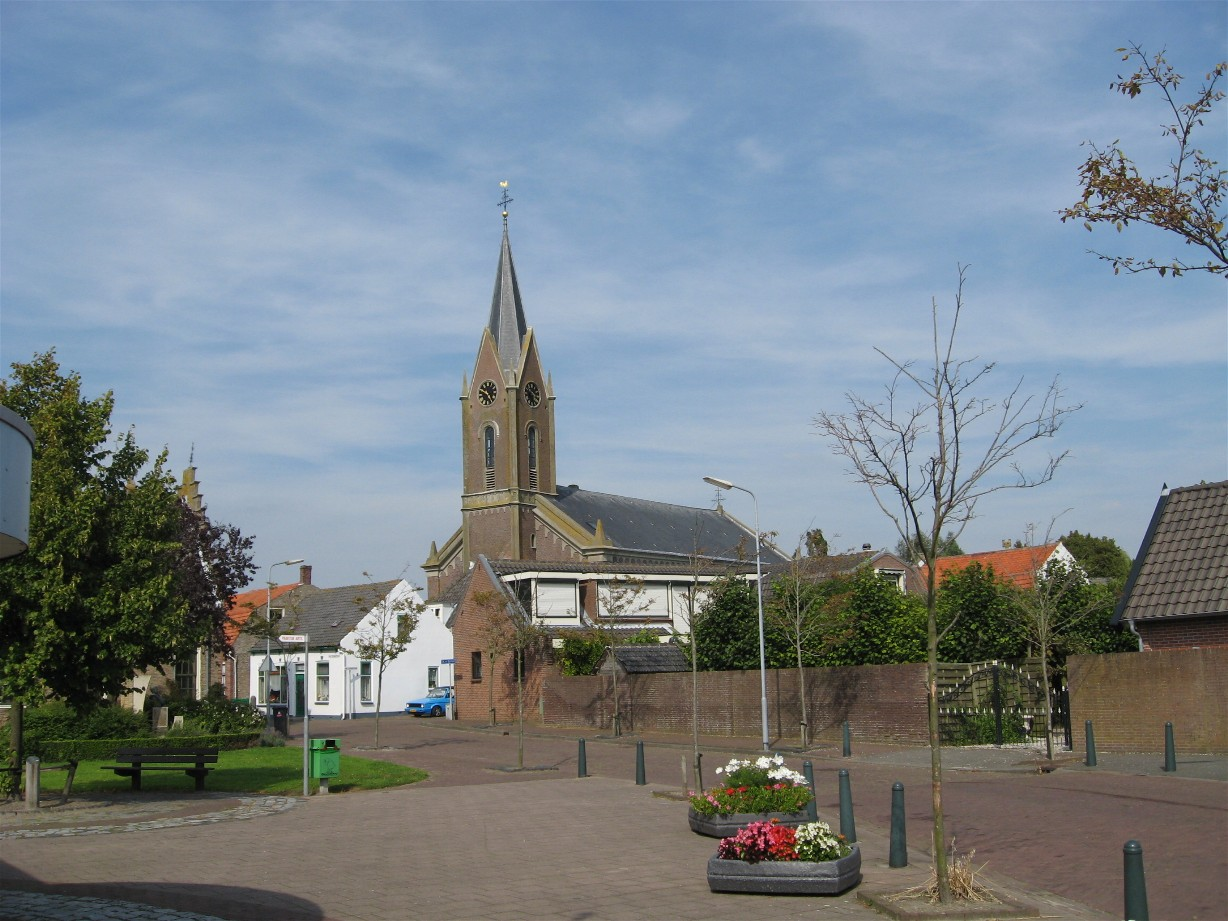
Zonnemaire

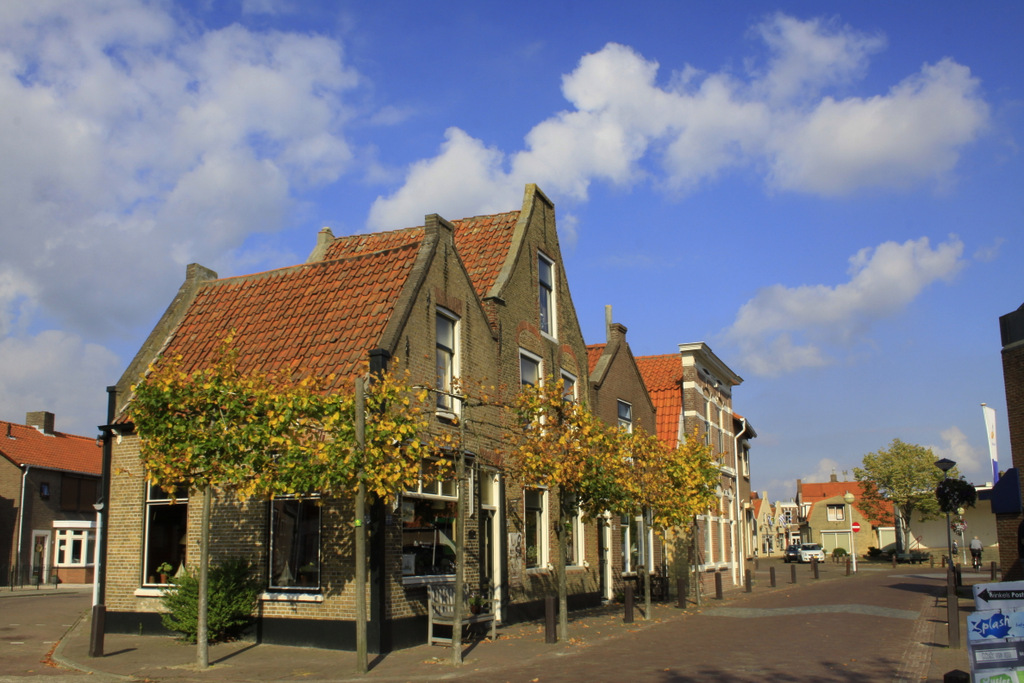
Aan de Korte Ring in Brunisse

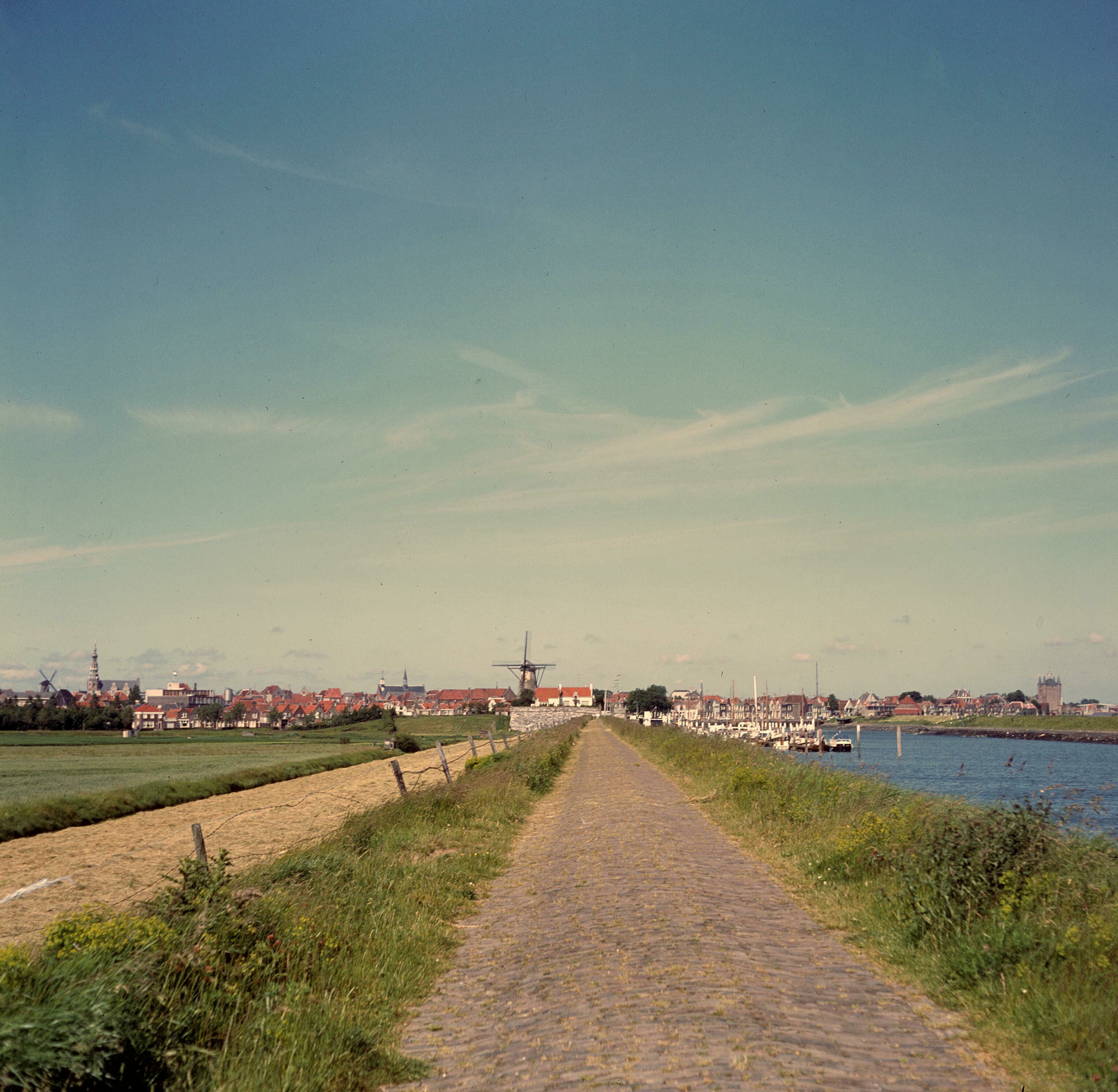
View of the town, seen from the Havendijk - Zierikzee
