= Moriaanshoofd =

- Hamlet
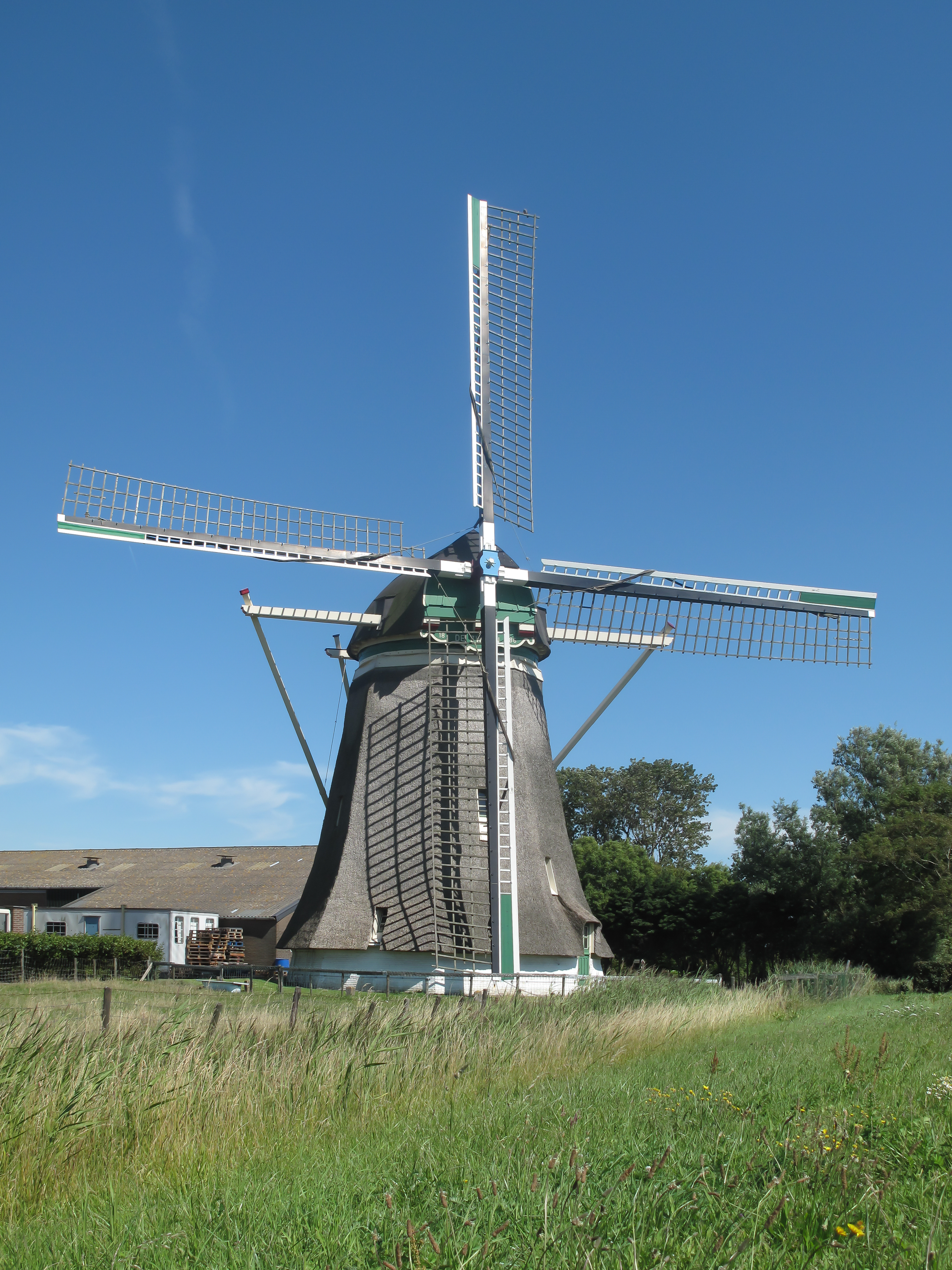
- Wind mill of Moriaanshoofd

- Location in the province of Zeeland in the Netherlands Moriaanshoofd (Netherlands)
- Coordinates: 51.6889°N 3.8492°E
- Country: Netherlands
- Province: Zeeland
- Municipality: Schouwen-Duiveland
- Time zone: UTC+1 (CET)
  - Summer (DST): UTC+2 (CEST)
- Postal code: 4321
- Dialing code: 0111

Moriaanshoofd is a hamlet in the Dutch province of Zeeland. It is a part of the municipality of Schouwen-Duiveland, and lies about 26 km southwest of Hellevoetsluis.

Moriaanshoofd is not a statistical entity, and the postal authorities have placed it under Kerkwerve. The hamlet consists of about 20 houses.
