= Charles Hofmann =

Dutch musician and composer

Franz Karl Hofmann, later Charles Hofmann (1763 – 24 May 1823) was a Dutch musician and composer.

== Bohemian background ==
Franz Karl Hofmann was born in Prague in 1763. Apart from the place and year of birth, virtually nothing is known about his Bohemian background. In Hofmann's youth, Bohemia was a part of the Habsburg monarchy.

== Dutch period ==
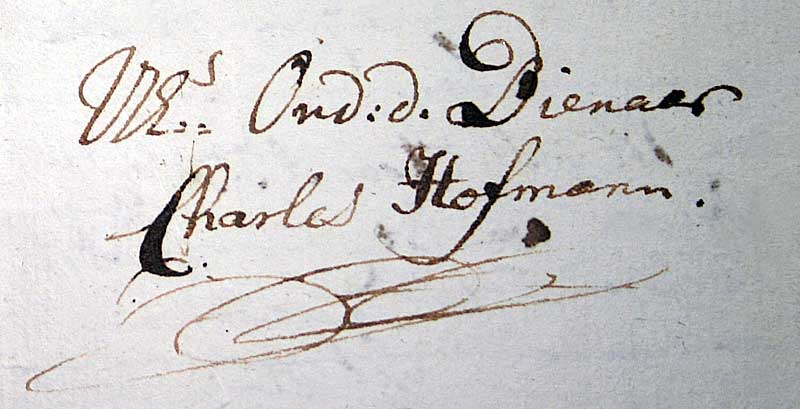
Signature of Charles Hofmann at the bottom of his letter from 20 May 1823, to the officer responsible for the Zierikzee 'schutterij' music corps, written shortly before his death.

Hofmann came to the Netherlands in his twenties. On 28 June 1787, he acquired the citizenship of the Dutch town of Zierikzee on the island of Schouwen-Duiveland. There, he earned a living by giving music lessons to children of the middle-class citizens and Latinised his name into Charles Hofmann (first name as pronounced in French). Ten years later, in 1797, the town council appointed him as 'kapelmeester' (music teacher and conductor) of the music corps (wind ensemble) of the 'schutterij' (voluntary city guard) of Zierikzee. Charles Hofmann would practise this post for a long time, until a few days before his death.

In 1805, the town council successfully tried to make Zierikzee more interesting for the musician Hofmann by appointing him as stadsmuziekmeester (music teacher recommended by the town government). This function was especially created for him, with an annual income attached to it.

One of Hofmann's compositions is the preserved arrangement of the Viennese song "O Mein lieber Augustin", of which the Dutch later would use the melody for the feast of Saint Nicholas. Hofmann's composition 'Air favorit O mein lieber Augustin, varié pour violon ...' concerns eight lively variations for violin, and was published by Plattner in Rotterdam in 1809. This composition was dedicated to the young gentleman Gualtherus Holtius of the village of Koudekerk aan den Rijn. In 1997 the work was discovered at the Netherlands Music Institute, where it had been preserved.

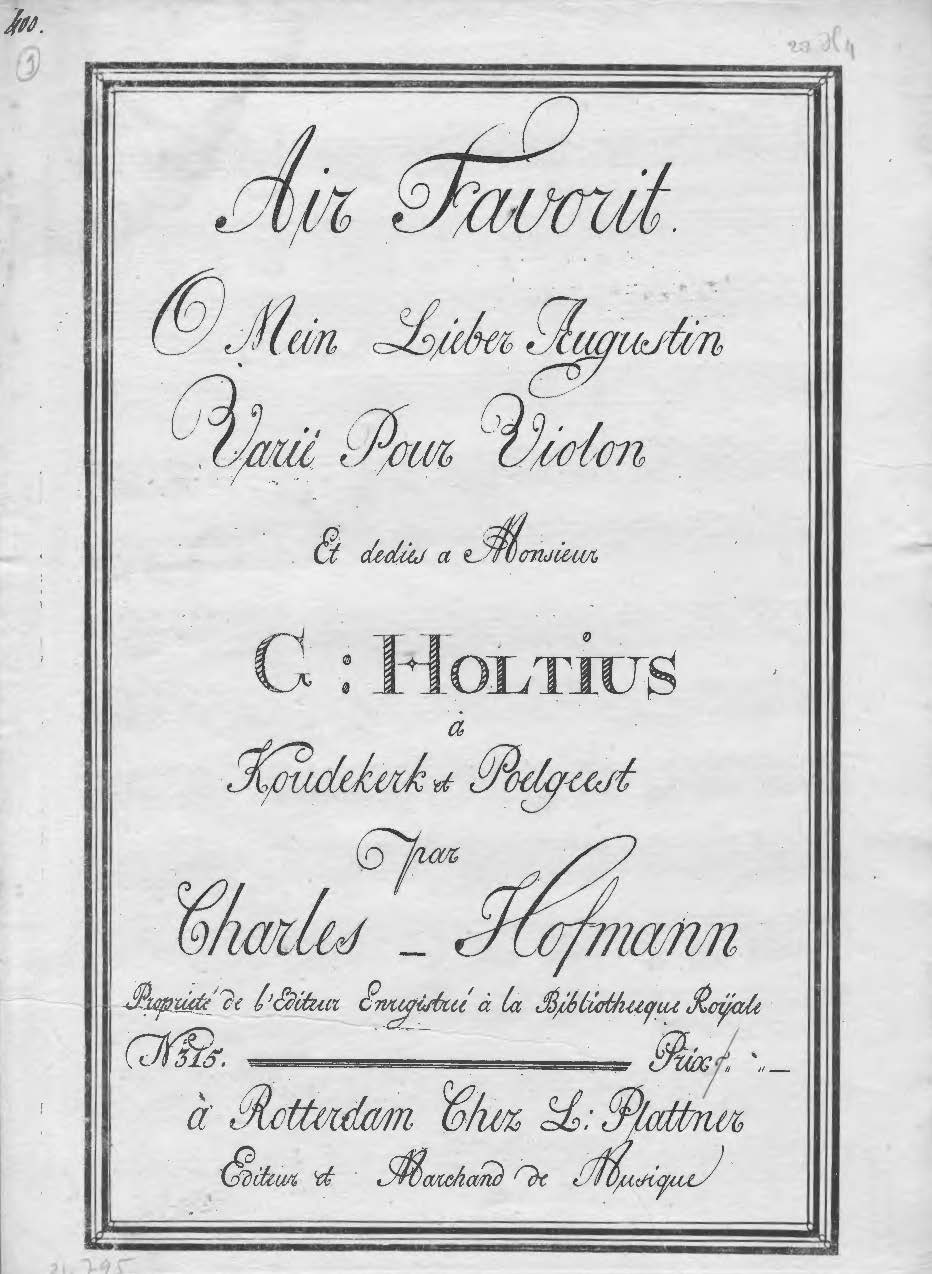
Frontispiece of the violin composition "Air Favorit" by Hofmann published by Lodewijk Plattner in Rotterdam in 1809.

In the years 1809–1822 Hofmann conducted balls in distinguished Zierikzee guest houses.

== Freemasonry years ==
In 1800, when the Zierikzee freemason clubhouse was put into service, Hofmann was initiated as a mason pupil with the title of 'frère à talent' (artistic functionary). A few years later he obtained the officer's rank of 'kapelmeester' at the lodge. For a freemasonry initiation ritual Hofmann wrote or used musical annotations for Schiller's Ode an die Freude, the famous poem Beethoven would use later for the final movement of his Ninth Symphony. Most probably Hofmann used just a manuscript for the ceremony. Unfortunately only the note about Hofmann's music document survived.

== Marriage ==
At the age of 36 Charles Hofmann married Johanna Catharina Broers of Zierikzee, in his domicile on 4 January 1809. Amidst their six children there was the eldest son Jan Thomas. Jan Thomas would later name his first born son Charles Augustijn after his father, almost certainly also referring to his published 1809 violin variations.

== Death ==
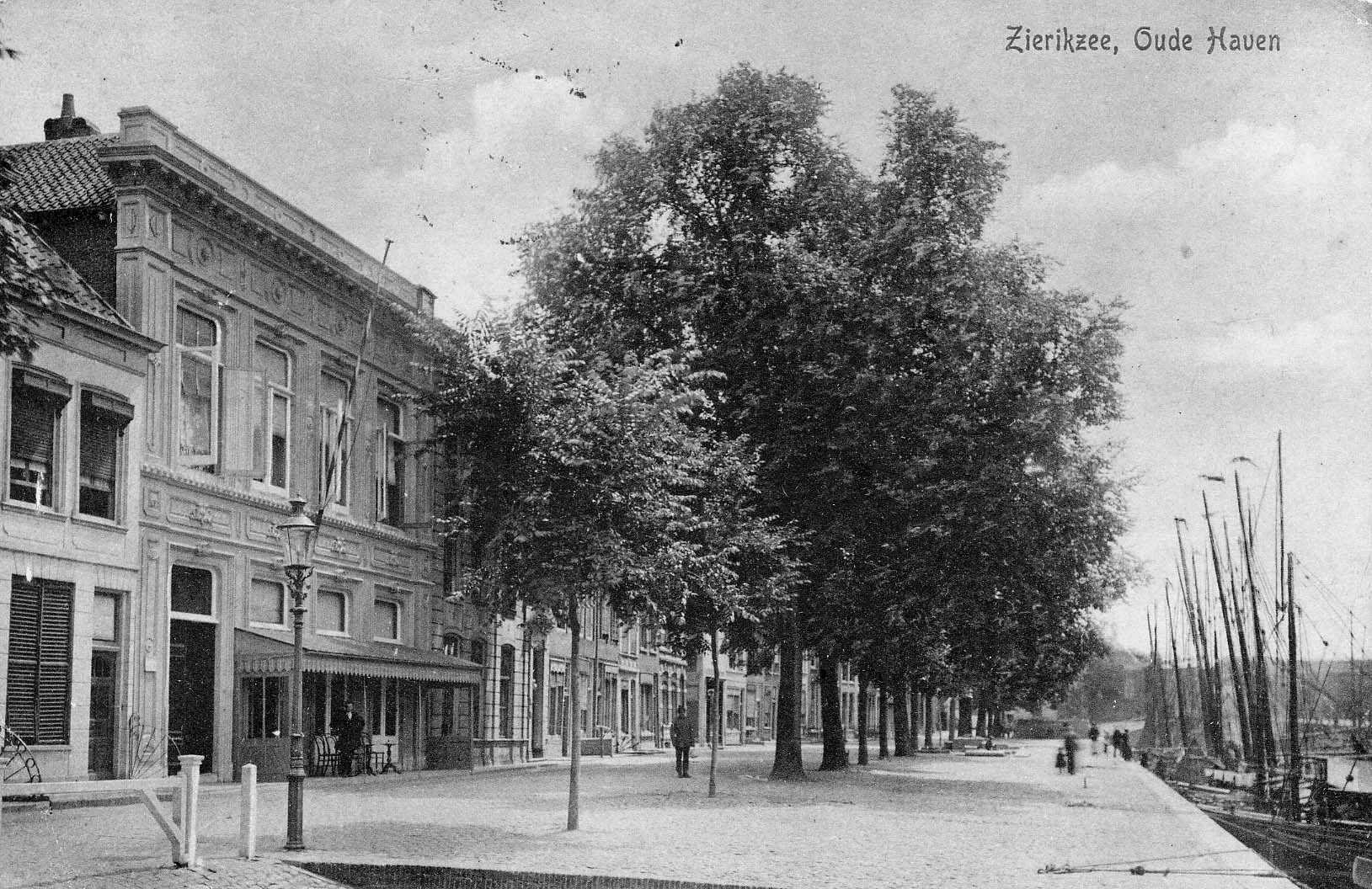
The dwelling of the Hofmann family at the Oude Haven in Zierikzee, about 1915. The large building on the right is the mentioned establishment.

At the beginning of the year 1823 Charles Hofmann requested the town council to dismiss him as leader of the 'schutterij' music corps. On 24 May 1823 he died at the age of 60 in his Zierikzee dwelling at Oude Haven 11. This house would become part of an establishment frequently used for music events in the subsequent century. Johanna Catharina, his wife, outlived her husband for 36 years, and died in 1859.

In the summer of the year of Hofmann's death the former staff musician from the town of Steenbergen, Magnus Eichner, succeeded Hofmann as leader of the corps of the Zierikzee 'schutterij'. The corps does still exist, albeit in another shape: as the Zierikzee royal music society ‘Kunst en Eer’.
