= Nieuwerkerke =

Nieuwerkerke Nieuwerkerke Schutje
- Hamlet
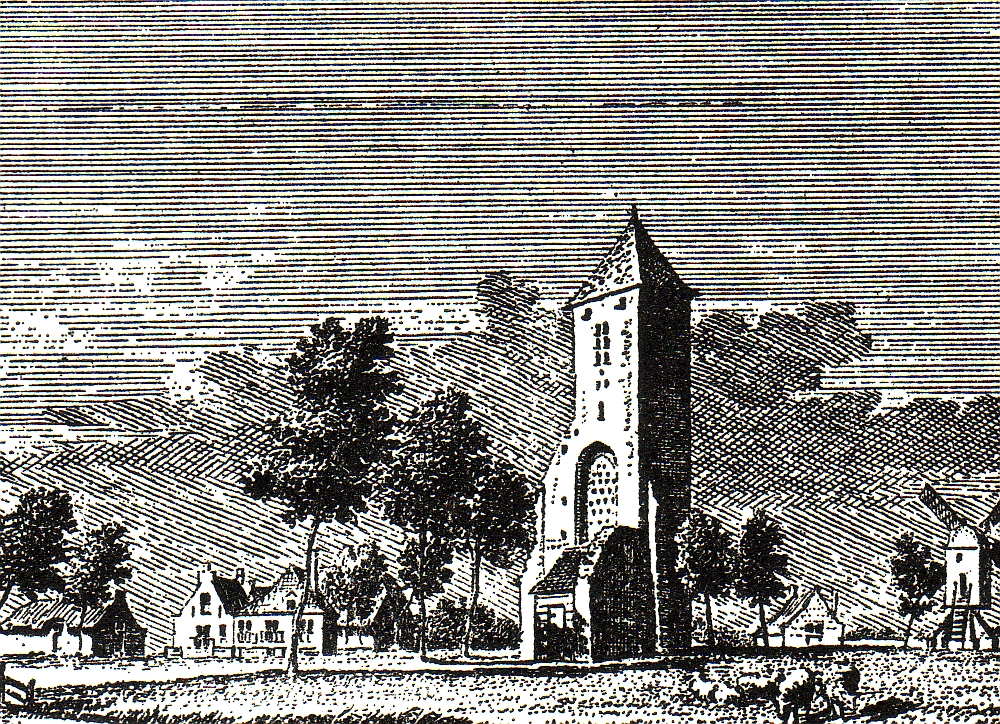
- Nieuwerkerke (1745)

- Location in the province of Zeeland in the Netherlands Nieuwerkerke (Netherlands)
- Coordinates: 51.6998°N 3.8906°E
- Country: Netherlands
- Province: Zeeland
- Municipality: Schouwen-Duiveland
- Time zone: UTC+1 (CET)
  - Summer (DST): UTC+2 (CEST)
- Postal code: 4321
- Dialing code: 0111

Nieuwerkerke (also: Nieuwerkerke Schutje) is a hamlet in the Dutch province of Zeeland. It is a part of the municipality of Schouwen-Duiveland, and lies about 3 km southwest of Brouwershaven.

Nieuwerkerke is not a statistical entity, and the postal authorities have placed it under Kerkwerve. It was home to 140 people in 1840. Nowadays, it consists of a handful of houses. Nieuwerkerken did have a church, but it was destroyed in 1576 by Spanish troops and never rebuilt.

Nieuwerkerke was a separate municipality until 1813, when it was merged with Kerkwerve.
