= Bruinisse =

- Village
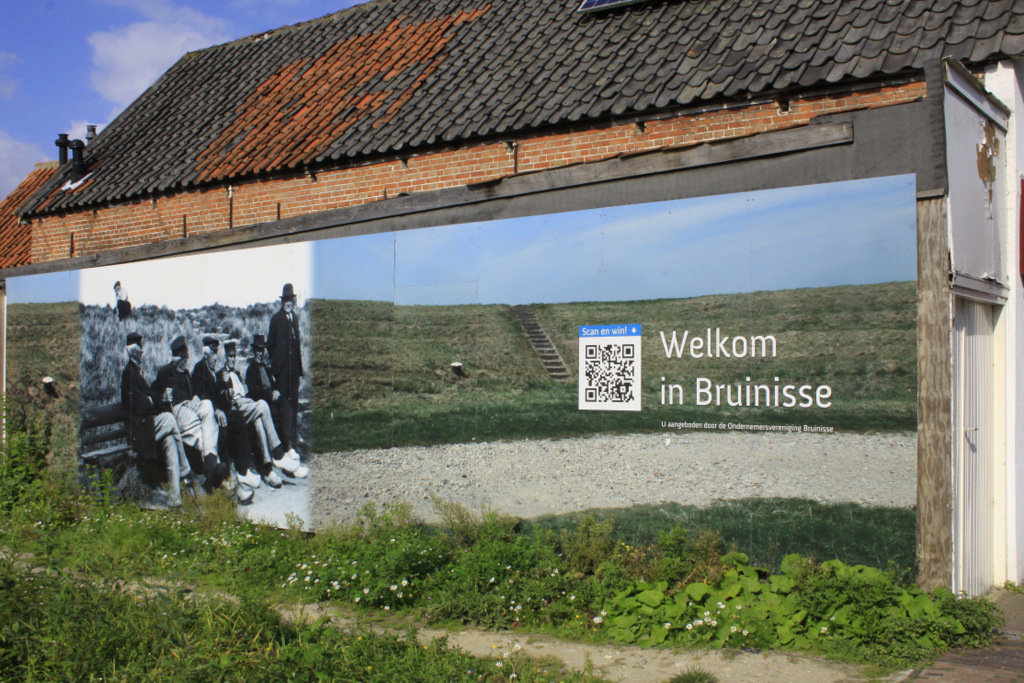
- Welkom in Bruinisse (Welcome to Bruinisse)

- Coat of arms

- Location in the province of Zeeland in the Netherlands Bruinisse (Netherlands)
- Coordinates: 51°39′37″N 4°5′36″E
- Country: Netherlands
- Province: Zeeland
- Municipality: Schouwen-Duiveland

Area
  - Total: 13.23 km^{2} (5.11 sq mi)
- Elevation: 0.8 m (2.6 ft)

Population (2021)
  - Total: 3,775
  - Density: 285.3/km^{2} (739.0/sq mi)
- Time zone: UTC+1 (CET)
  - Summer (DST): UTC+2 (CEST)
- Postal code: 4311
- Dialing code: 0111

Bruinisse is a village in the south-west of the Netherlands. It is located in the municipality of Schouwen-Duiveland, Zeeland.

== History ==
The village was first mentioned in 1480 or 1481 as "Brunesse ... noviter erecta", and is a combination of headland and mud. Bruinisse was originally an island. In 1452, Philip the Good gave permission to build dikes and polder the salt marshes. The polder was completed in 1468. Bruinisse is a front street village with half a ring road around the church. The economy was mainly based on mussel fishing. The harbour was extended in 1872 and 1912.

The Reformed Church is a neoclassic aisleless church built in 1904 as a replacement of the 1868 church. In 1962, it was restored and the entrance was moved to the side. Bruinisse was home to 1,430 people in 1840.

Bruinisse was severely damaged during World War II. On 12 February 1944, the land around Bruinisse was inundated by the Germans and bombed by the Allies on 5 January 1945 causing the destroying of many houses including the church from 1467. The village was flooded during the North Sea flood of 1953. In 1964, the Grevelingendam was built connecting Schouwen-Duiveland with Goeree-Overflakkee. A recreational centre with marina was constructed to the north-west of the village.

Bruinisse was a separate municipality until 1997, when it was merged into Schouwen-Duiveland.

== Gallery ==
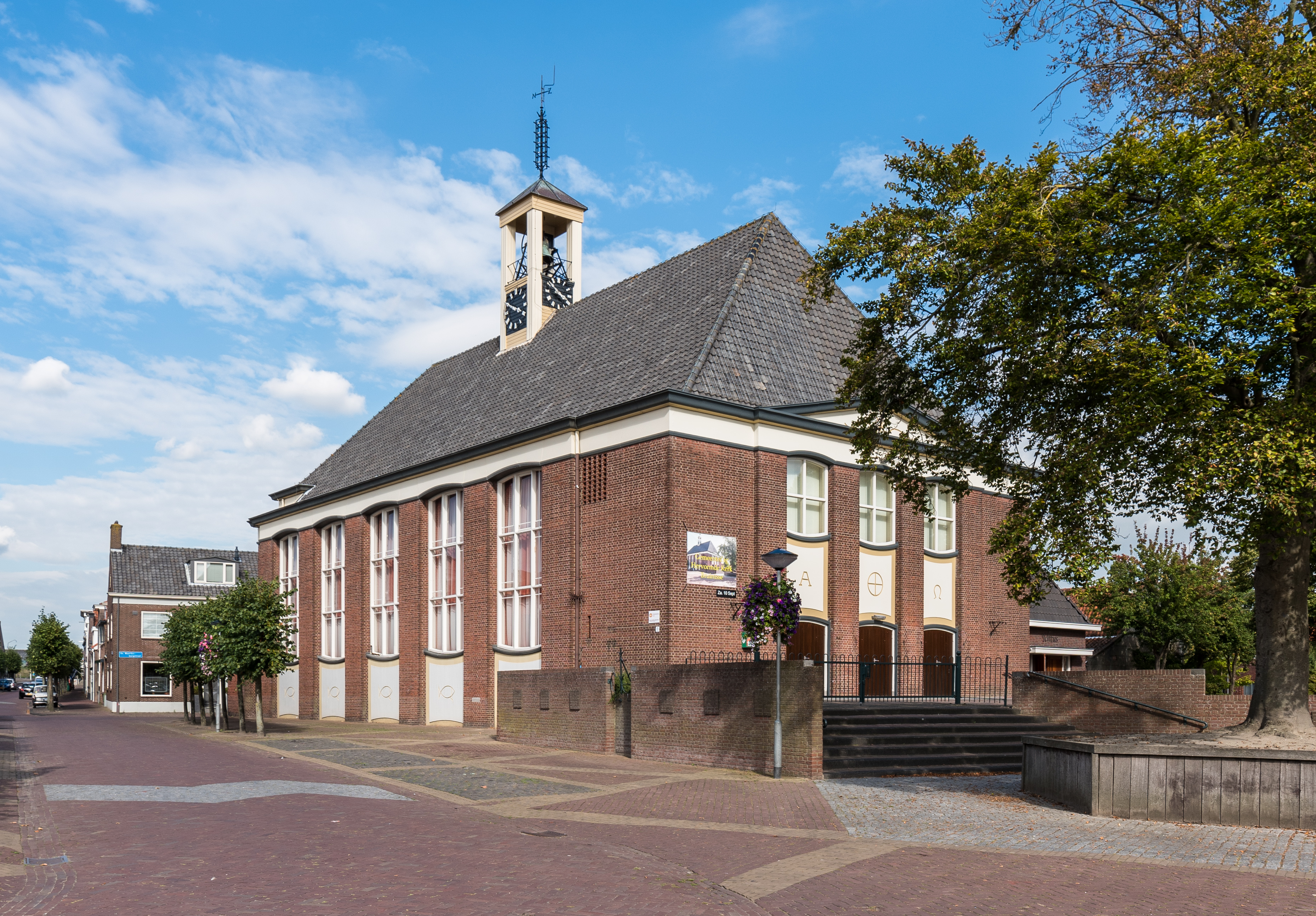
Dutch Reformed Church

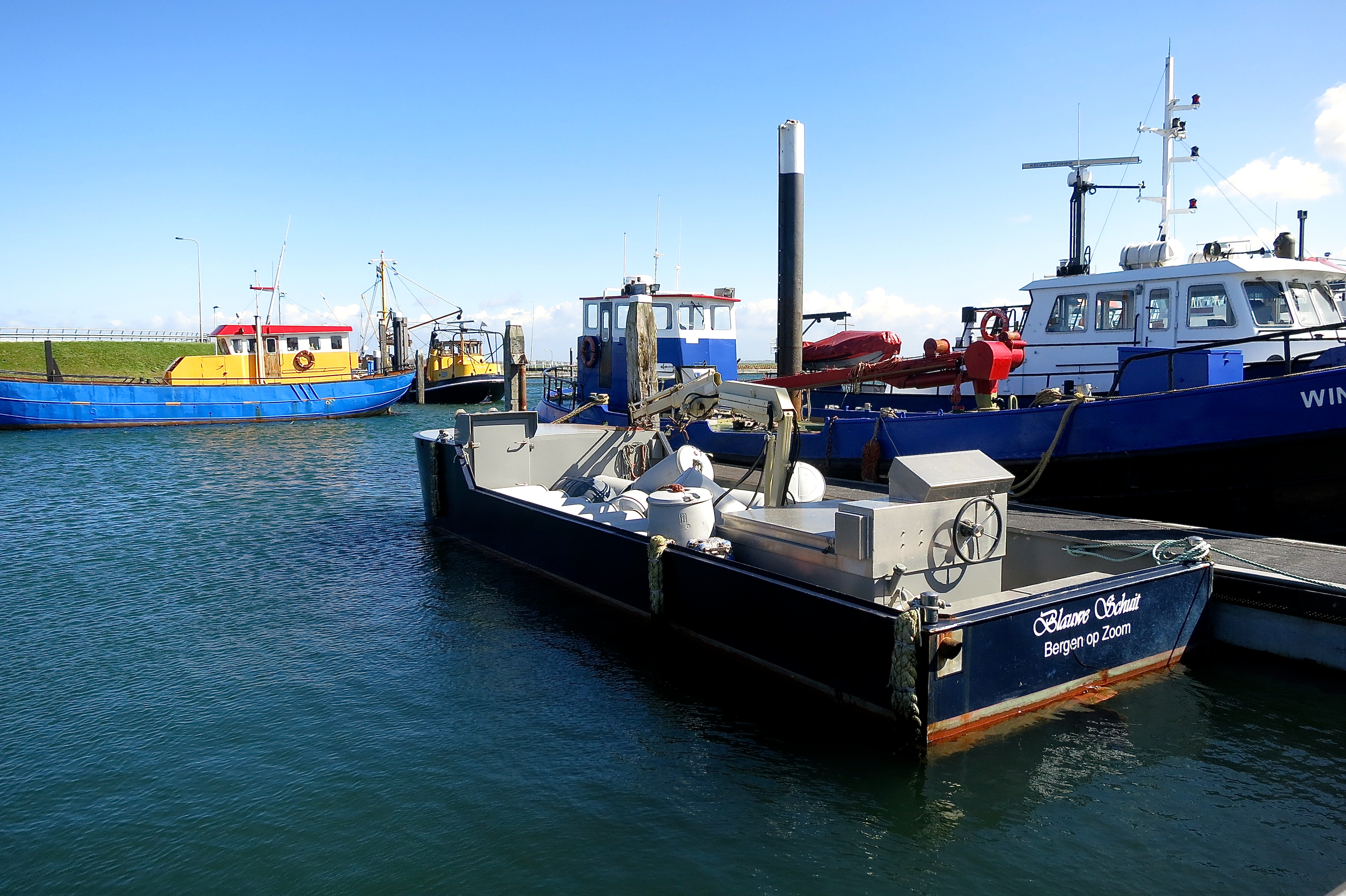
Harbour of Bruinisse

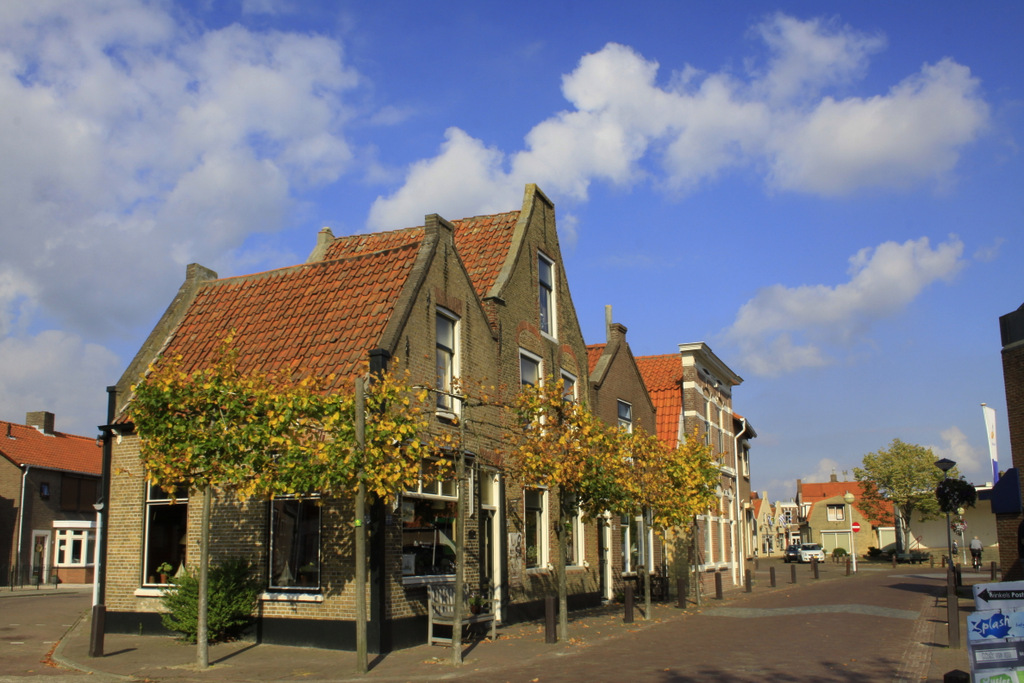
Street view
