= Burghsluis =

- Hamlet
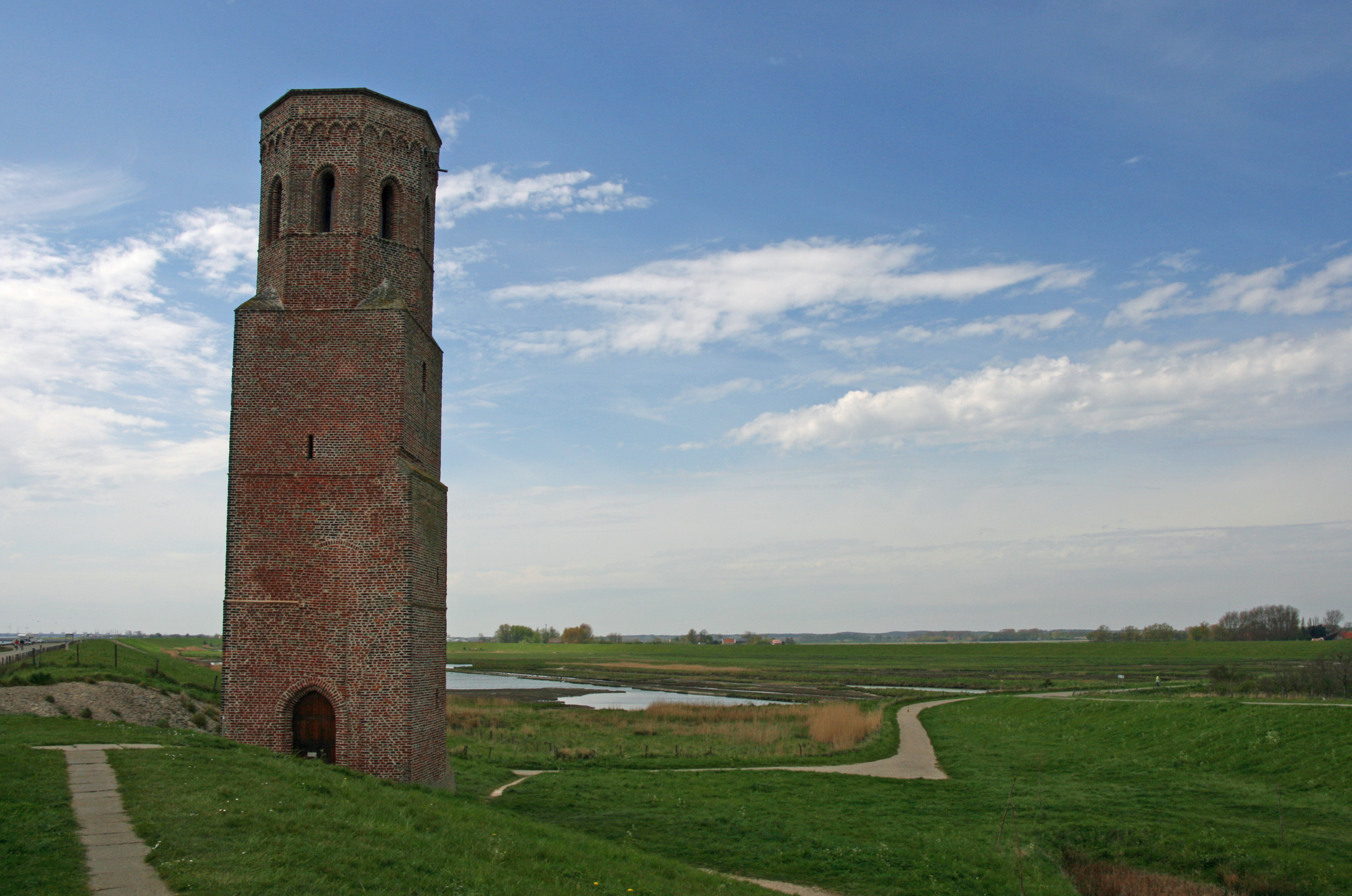
- Plompe Toren

- Location in the province of Zeeland in the Netherlands Burghsluis (Netherlands)
- Coordinates: 51°41′N 3°45′E
- Country: Netherlands
- Province: Zeeland
- Municipality: Schouwen-Duiveland
- Time zone: UTC+1 (CET)
  - Summer (DST): UTC+2 (CEST)
- Postal code: 4328
- Dialing code: 0111

Burghsluis is a hamlet in the Dutch province of Zeeland. It is a part of the municipality of Schouwen-Duiveland, and lies about 22 km north of Middelburg.

Burghsluis is not a statistical entity, and the postal authorities have placed it under Burgh-Haamstede. It has place signs and a little harbour. It was home to 89 people in 1840. Nowadays, it consists of about 30 houses.

The Plompe Toren is located near Burghsluis which is the sole reminder of the flooded village Koudekerke. Around 1550 dikes were built, but the village of Koudekerke was left outside the dike. The village was demolished and used as building material except for the tower of the church which remained standing.

== Gallery ==
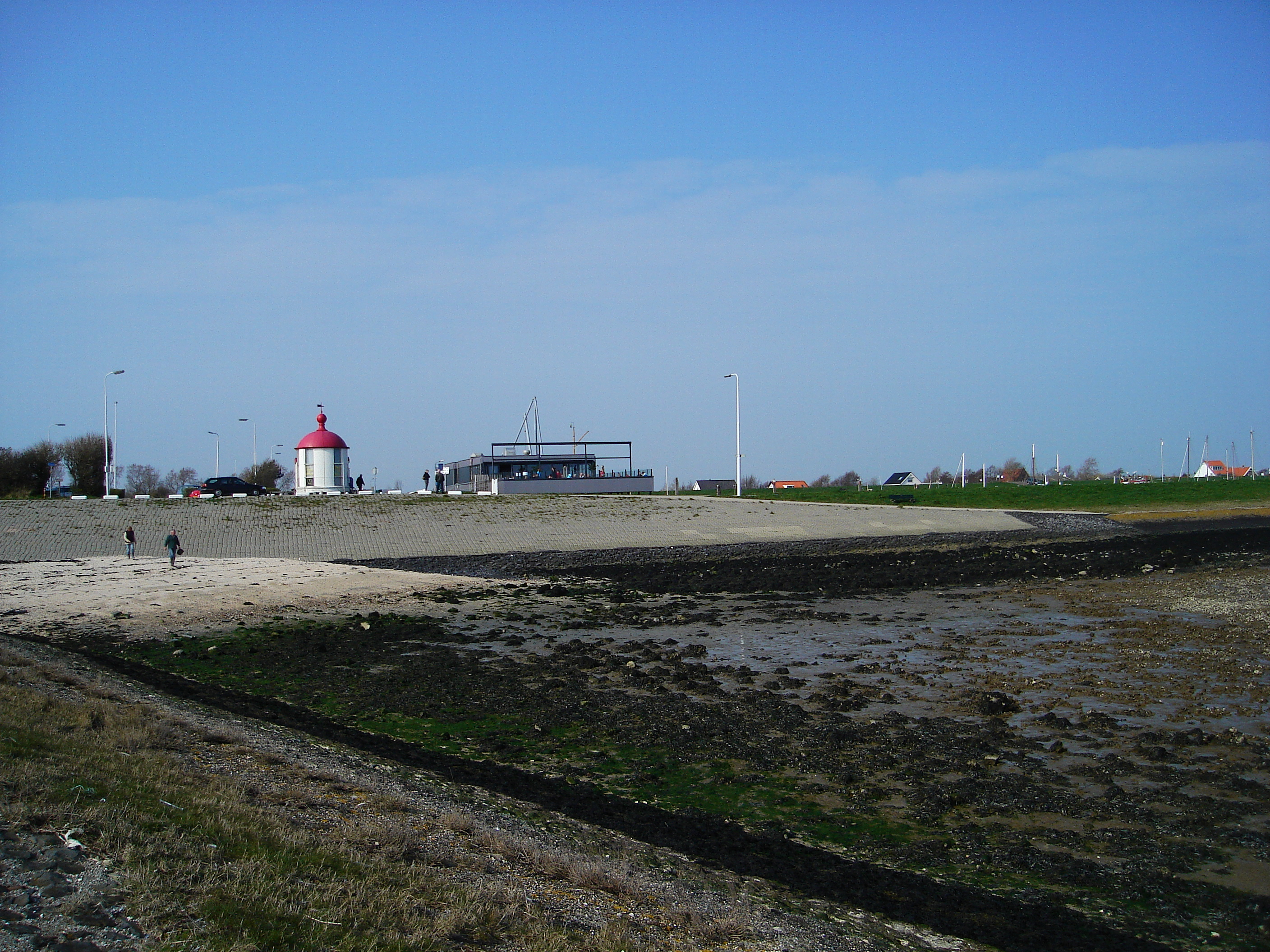
Beach at Burghsluis
