= Reuzenhoek =

- Hamlet
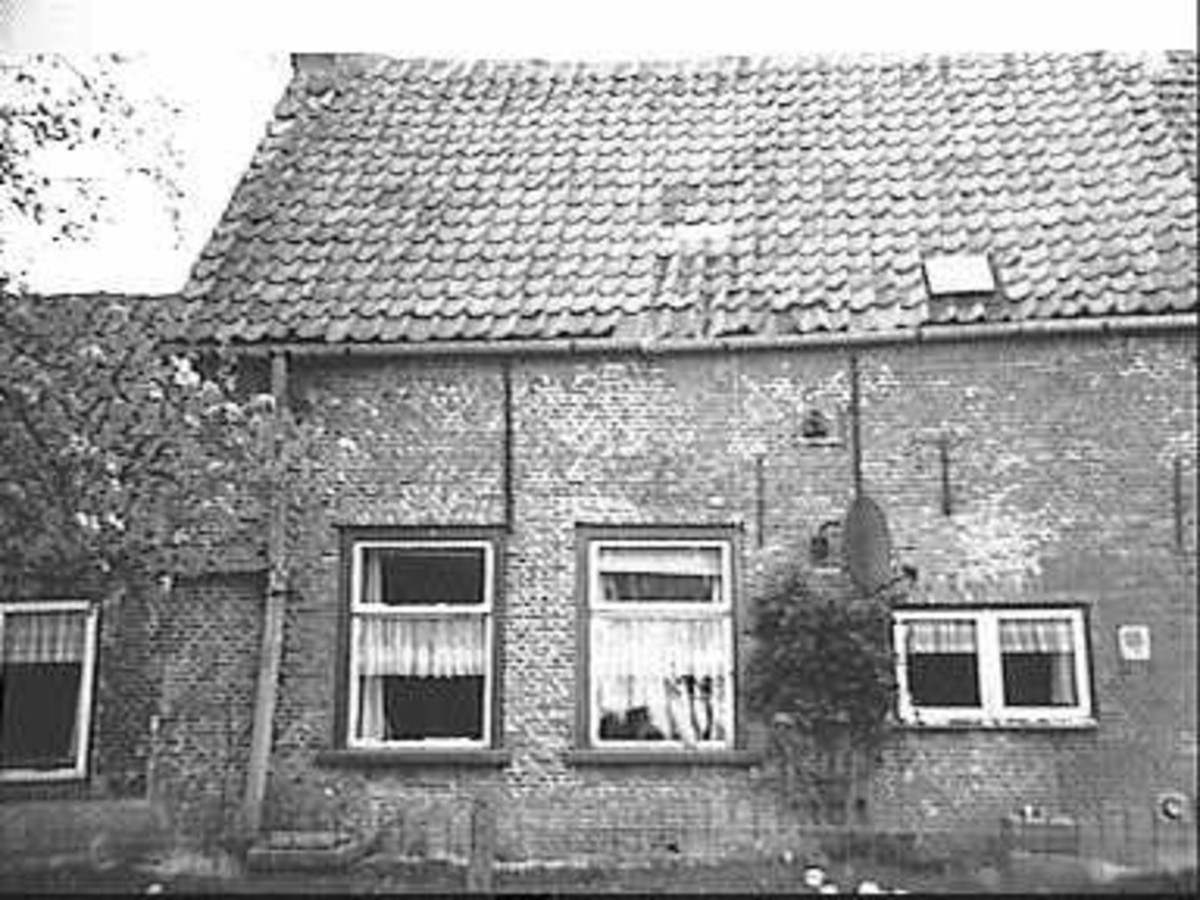
- Farm in Reuzenhoek

- Location in the province of Zeeland in the Netherlands Reuzenhoek (Netherlands)
- Coordinates: 51.3263°N 3.9127°E
- Country: Netherlands
- Province: Zeeland
- Municipality: Terneuzen
- Time zone: UTC+1 (CET)
  - Summer (DST): UTC+2 (CEST)
- Postal code: 4533
- Dialing code: 0115

Reuzenhoek is a hamlet in the Dutch province of Zeeland. It is a part of the municipality of Terneuzen and is about 28 kilometres (17 mi) southeast of Vlissingen.

Reuzenhoek is not a statistical entity, and the postal authorities have placed it under Terneuzen. It has place name signs. It was home to 110 people in 1840. Nowadays, it consists of about 60 houses.

It was first mentioned between 1838 and 1857 as Reuzenhoek. The etymology is unclear.
