= Stroodorp =

- Hamlet
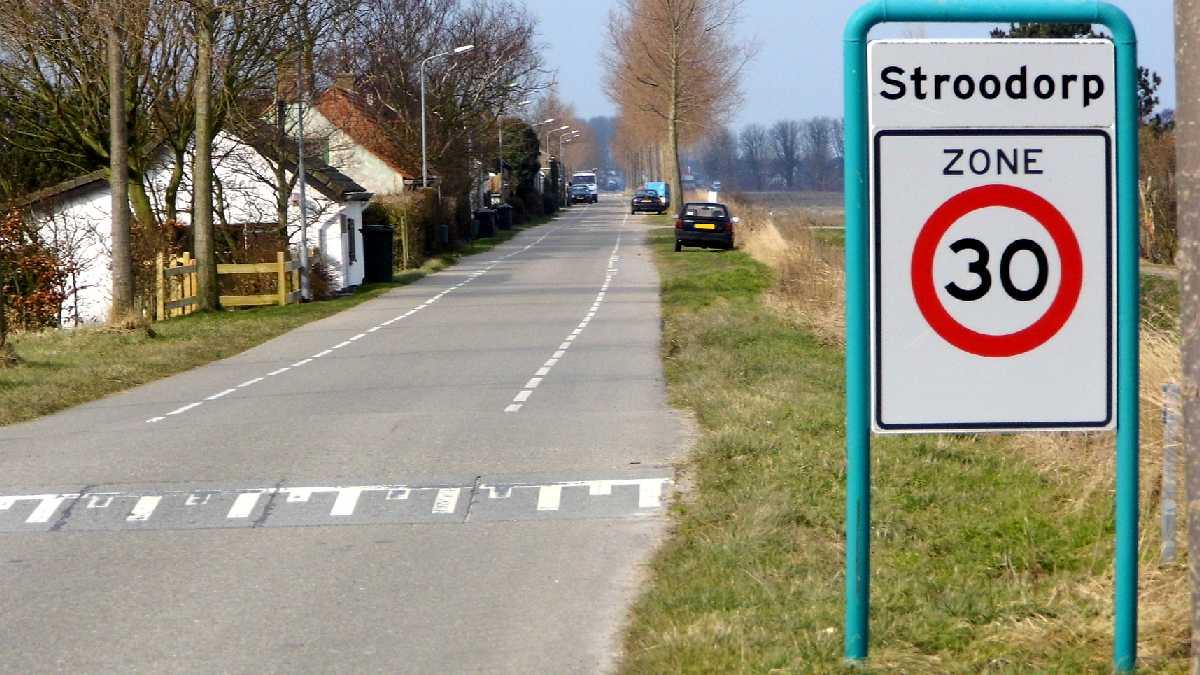
- Welcome to Stroodorp

- Location in the province of Zeeland in the Netherlands Stroodorp (Netherlands)
- Coordinates: 51°33′37″N 3°43′40″E
- Country: Netherlands
- Province: Zeeland
- Municipality: Noord-Beveland
- Time zone: UTC+1 (CET)
  - Summer (DST): UTC+2 (CEST)
- Postal code: 4493
- Dialing code: 113

Stroodorp is a hamlet in the Dutch province of Zeeland. It is a part of the municipality of Noord-Beveland, and lies about 11 km northeast of Middelburg.

Stroodorp is not a statistical entity, and the postal authorities have placed it under Kamperland. The hamlet consists of about 35 houses, but most are holiday homes, and only 6 are permanently inhabited.

The hamlet was first mentioned in 1847 as Strooijedorp (Het), and means "straw village" after the straw covering of the temporary houses of the people who poldered the land.
