= Nieuw-Haamstede =

- Hamlet
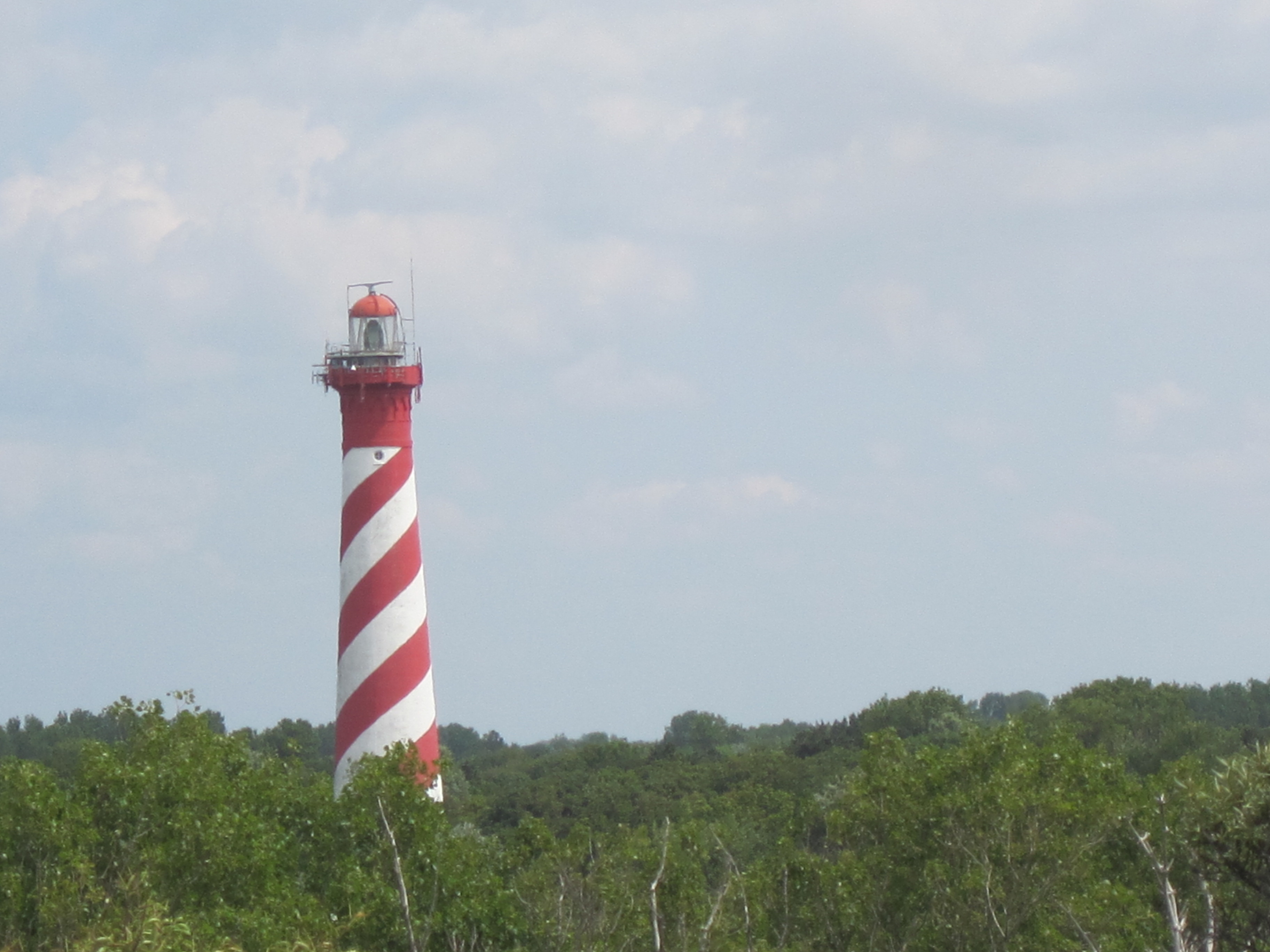
- Lightbouse Westerlichttoren

- Location in the province of Zeeland in the Netherlands Nieuw-Haamstede (Netherlands)
- Coordinates: 51.7114°N 3.7036°E
- Country: Netherlands
- Province: Zeeland
- Municipality: Schouwen-Duiveland

Area
  - Total: 1.06 km^{2} (0.41 sq mi)
- Elevation: 3.0 m (9.8 ft)

Population (2021)
  - Total: 410
  - Density: 390/km^{2} (1,000/sq mi)
- Time zone: UTC+1 (CET)
  - Summer (DST): UTC+2 (CEST)
- Postal code: 4328
- Dialing code: 0111

Nieuw-Haamstede is a hamlet in the Dutch province of Zeeland. It is a part of the municipality of Schouwen-Duiveland, and lies about 25 km north of Middelburg.

It was built before 1940 as a holiday neighbourhood in the dunes belonging to Haamstede. The lighthouse Westerlichttoren was built between 1837 and 1840 and is 50 metres (160 ft) tall.
