= Sirjansland =

- Village
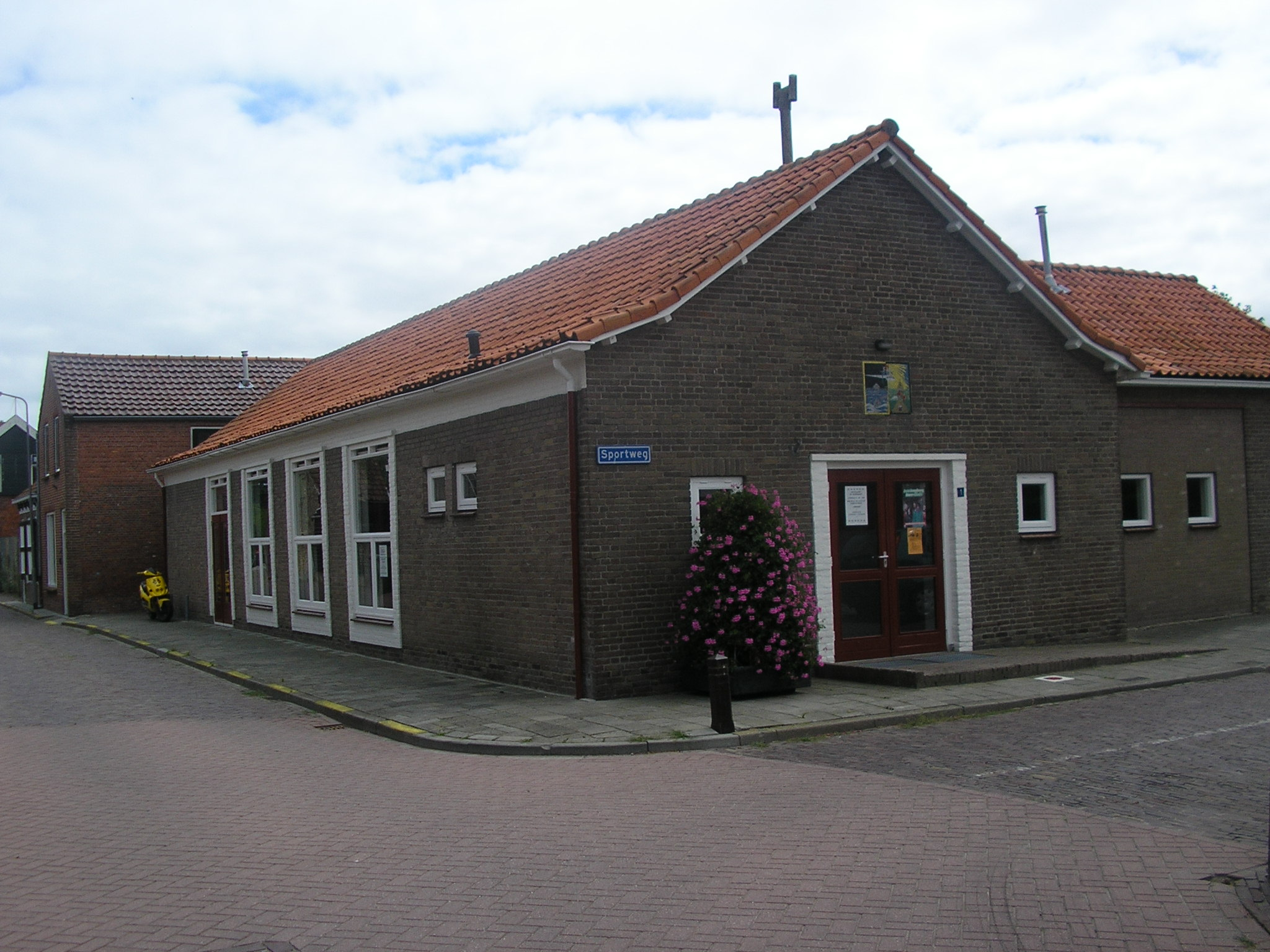
- Association building

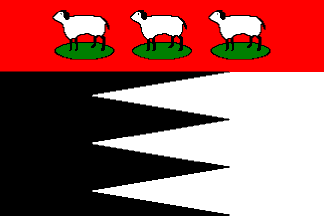
- Flag Coat of arms

- Location in the province of Zeeland in the Netherlands Sirjansland (Netherlands)
- Coordinates: 51°40′26″N 4°1′56″E
- Country: Netherlands
- Province: Zeeland
- Municipality: Schouwen-Duiveland

Area
  - Total: 3.85 km^{2} (1.49 sq mi)
- Elevation: 0.0 m (0 ft)

Population (2021)
  - Total: 345
  - Density: 89.6/km^{2} (232/sq mi)
- Time zone: UTC+1 (CET)
  - Summer (DST): UTC+2 (CEST)
- Postal code: 4308
- Dialing code: 0111

Sirjansland is a village in the Dutch province of Zeeland. It is a part of the municipality of Schouwen-Duiveland, and lies about 19 km south of Hellevoetsluis.

== History ==
The village was first mentioned in 1573 as "Zeer Jans Lant", and means "(polder)land of Sir Jan" which refers to John of Beaumont who owned the land, and built dikes around the area in 1305. Before 1297, Sirjanslans and Dreischor formed a single village. In 1297 a flood resulted in the separation of the two parts.

A church was known to exist around 1500. During the North Sea flood of 1953, it was severely damaged. The church was demolished in 1958.

Sirjansland was home to 295 people in 1840. The village was a separate municipality until 1816, when it was merged with Oosterland. In 1997, it became part of the municipality of Schouwen-Duiveland.

== Gallery ==
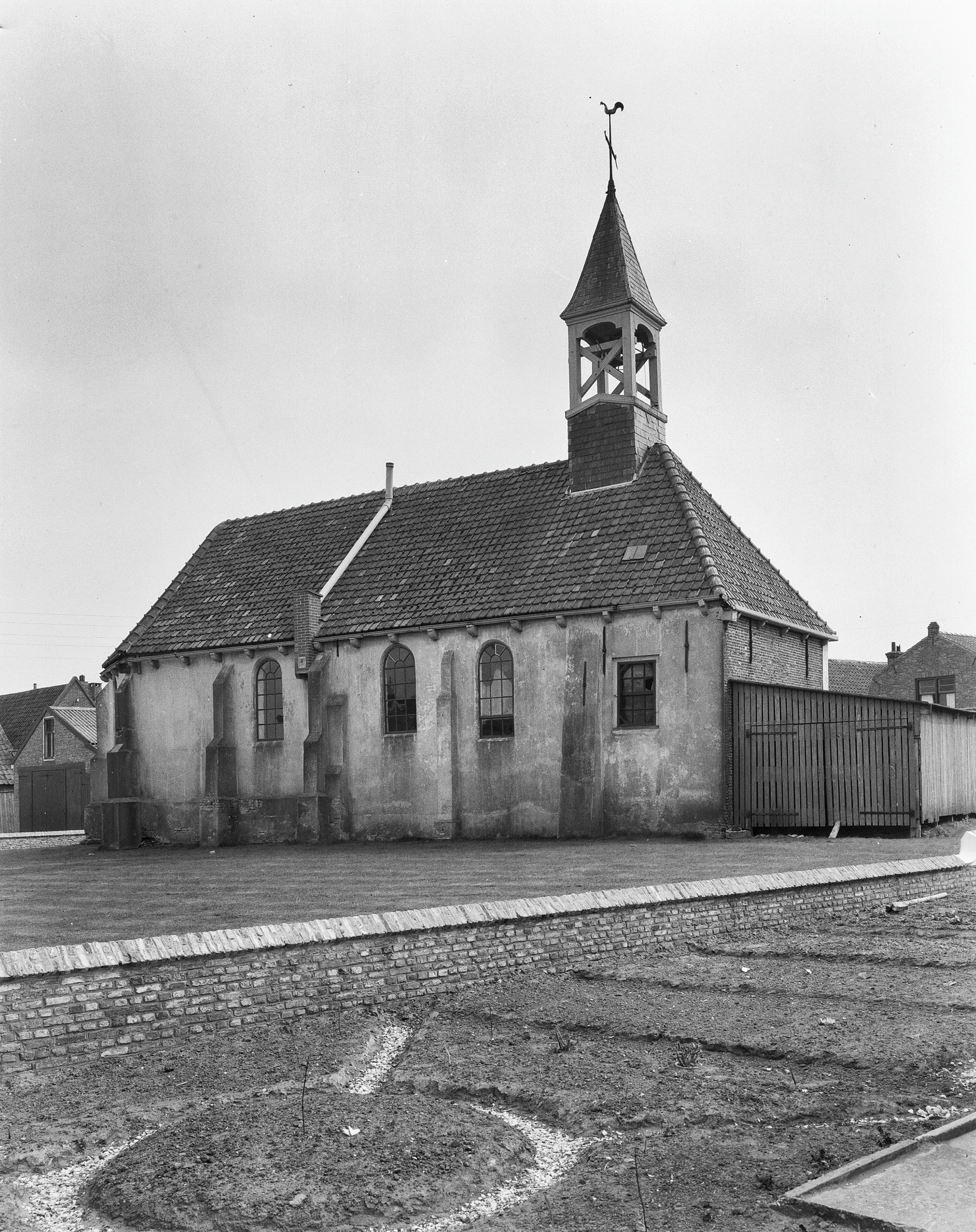
Former church (1957)

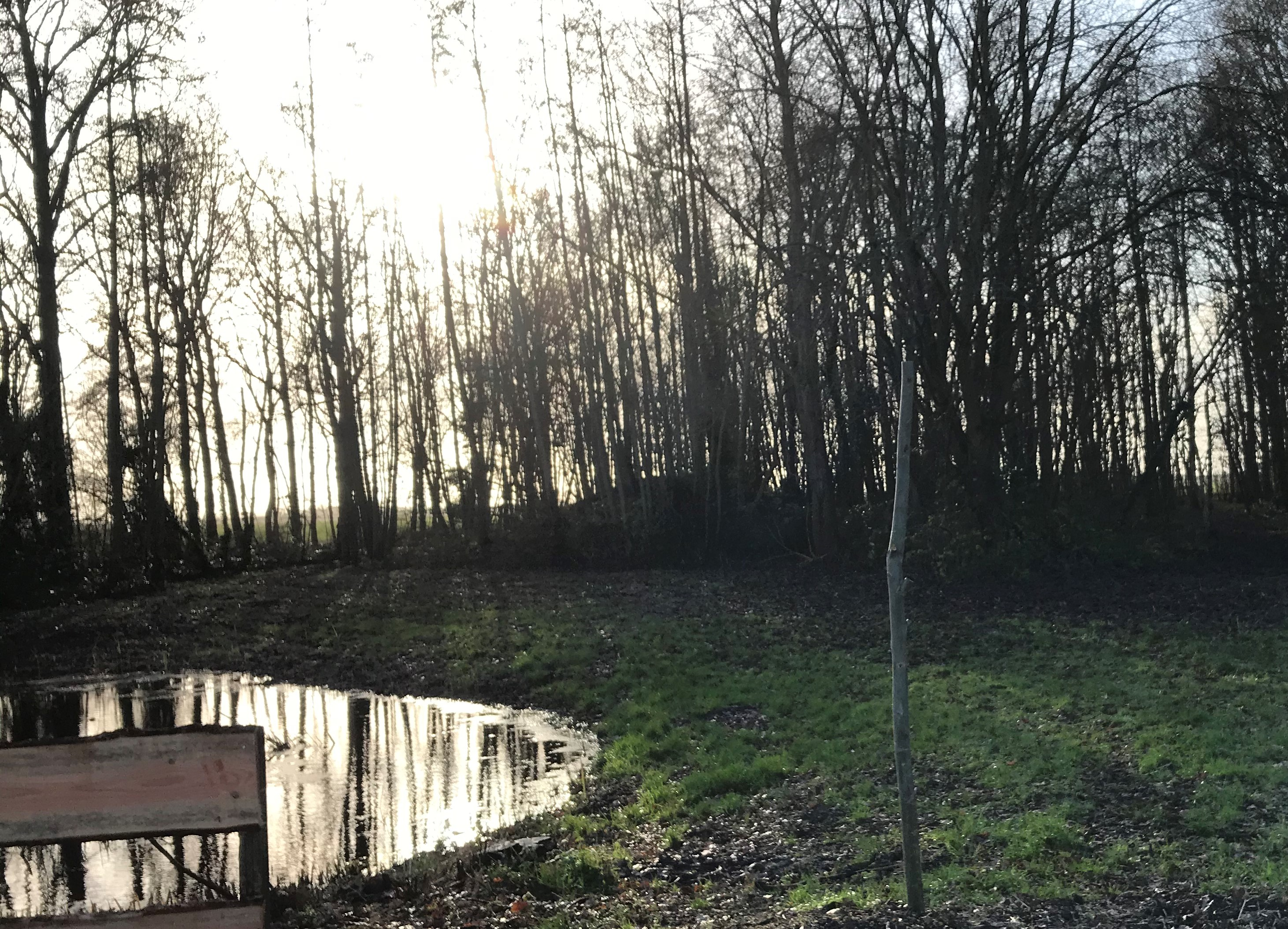
Village forest
