= Cornelius van Zierikzee =

- Born: c. 1405; Zierikzee, Netherlands
- Died: 21 February 1462; Antwerp, Belgium

Cornelius van Zierikzee (c. 1405 – 1462) was a Dutch priest known for his work in Scotland.

== Life and times ==
He was born at Zierikzee, Netherlands, about 1405. The strict observance of the Franciscan Rule, upheld and propagated throughout Italy by Bernardino of Siena and Giovanni da Capistrano, was early introduced into Germany. At twenty Cornelius entered the Franciscan Order in the province of Cologne, which at that time included the greater part of the Netherlands. It was famous for the number and sanctity of its members, among whom were several Scotsmen who had been educated at the universities on the Continent.

This revival of the Franciscan life under the guidance of Bernardine no doubt came to the knowledge of King James I of Scotland. In 1436 the king requested the superiors of the order that he might have friars of the Observance sent into his kingdom; but it was not until after the provincial chapter of the Observants held at Gouda in 1447, and apparently because of a fresh application by his son King James II, that it was decided to comply with the royal wishes.

John Perioche de Mauberg, Vicar-general of the Ultramontine Observants, selected Cornelius as head of the mission. Cornelius was accompanied by six associates, of whom at least one, John Richardson, a graduate of the University of Paris, was a Scot; they were received with enthusiasm by all classes. Within a few years after the arrival of the Observants in Scotland they established nine convents in different towns; the postulants for admission to the order were numerous; youths belonging to the best families renounced the world to embrace the Franciscan life of poverty.

== Legacy ==
Among those who received the habit from Cornelius were:

- Jerome Lindsay of Paris, son of the Earl of Crawford, commemorated in the Franciscan Martyrology with title of blessed, pre-eminent for his humility, mortification, and spirit of prayer
- David Crannok, who was physician to King James II and his consort Queen Margaret; he succeeded Cornelius in the government of the convents
- Robert Keith, renowned for the sanctity of his life, a member of the family of the Earl Marishal
- Robert Stuart, kinsman of King James V

The General Chapter of the Observants held at Mount-Luzon (Bourbonnais) erected the Scottish convents into a province, and granted it a seal representing Bernardine holding a tablet with the Holy Name of Jesus painted on it and three mitres at his feet, to mark that the Scottish province owed its origin to the companions of the saint.

The Scottish Franciscans enjoyed a great reputation throughout Europe for their austere lifestyle. James IV wrote to the pope in 1506 in praise of the Observants in his kingdom and their works. The Scottish province was in a flourishing state when the religious revolution broke out and the convents were destroyed. In 1460, John Patrick, Minister Provincial, accompanied by over one hundred priests, left Scotland for the Netherlands, where they were hospitably recognized and incorporated in the provinces of Holland and Belgium. In 1462, Cornelius, worn out by his labours and austerities, left Scotland for his own province of Cologne, where he died in the convent at Antwerp on February 21, 1462. Many miracles were reported at his tomb.

The writings of Cornelius, which consist of Conciones ad populum Scotiae, Sermones ad Fratres, and Epistolas plures, have never been published.
