= Beldert =

Human settlement in the Netherlands

- Hamlet
- Location in the province of Zeeland in the Netherlands Beldert (Netherlands)
- Coordinates: 51.682°N 3.9861°E
- Country: Netherlands
- Province: Zeeland
- Municipality: Schouwen-Duiveland
- Time zone: UTC+1 (CET)
  - Summer (DST): UTC+2 (CEST)
- Postal code: 4315
- Dialing code: 0111

Beldert or Belder is a hamlet in Schouwen-Duiveland, in Zeeland, Netherlands. It is located south of Dreischor. It was historically known for its harbor, but lost its function after the North Sea flood of 1953. It has also had a chapel.

== History ==
Initially in 1470-1471 it was called Bellaerde. In 1504-1505 it was called Bellaert. Bellaert is a family name that already appears in the Middle Ages in Zeeland. The closest village at the time was Maye, which disappeared in the 16th-century. In 1694 the name was changed to Beldert. Beldert is originally a water name. Beldert was known for its harbour, which was important for Dreischor. For that reason it was also known as Dreyscherhaven (Dreyscher harbour). To keep the harbour at water level there was a drainage lock. A steam pumping station was built in 1882 and was replaced by an electricity pump in 1934. During the North Sea flood of 1953, the dikes around Dijkwater broke at multiple places. Due to the danger of such an inlet, Dijkwater was dammed in 1954 and the harbour of Beldert lost its function. In 1959, the harbour was filled in.

Until 1960, Beldert was part of the municipality of Dreischor. In 1961 it became part of the municipality of Brouwershaven and in 1997 of the municipality of Schouwen-Duiveland. The hamlet of Beldert falls under the village of Dreischor.

== Legacy ==
In Dreischor at the Zuiddijk/Zuiddijkweg a sign commemorating the impact of the North Sea flood of 1953 upon Beldert.
