= Kerkwerve =

- Village
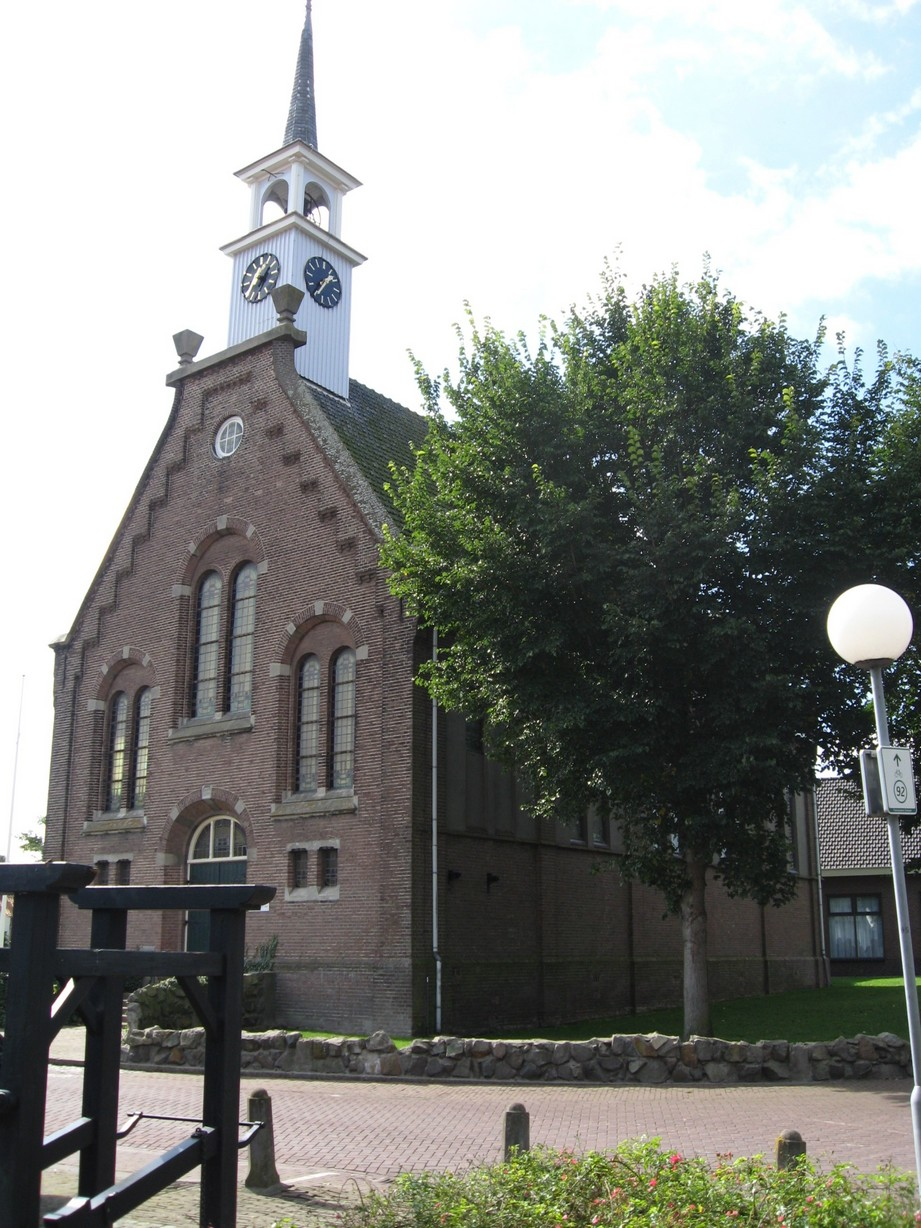
- Church in Kerkwerve

- Coat of arms

- Location in the province of Zeeland in the Netherlands Kerkwerve (Netherlands)
- Coordinates: 51°41′7″N 3°53′56″E
- Country: Netherlands
- Province: Zeeland
- Municipality: Schouwen-Duiveland

Area
  - Total: 25.93 km^{2} (10.01 sq mi)
- Elevation: −0.8 m (−2.6 ft)

Population (2021)
  - Total: 990
  - Density: 38/km^{2} (99/sq mi)
- Time zone: UTC+1 (CET)
  - Summer (DST): UTC+2 (CEST)
- Postal code: 4321
- Dialing code: 0111

Kerkwerve is a village in the Dutch province of Zeeland. It is a part of the municipality of Schouwen-Duiveland, and lies about 24 km southwest of Hellevoetsluis.

== History ==
The village was first mentioned in the 11th century as Kiricwereve, and means "artificial height with church". Kerkwerve is a circular village around a church which developed during the Middle Ages. In the 14th century, the manor house Huis Te Werve was built to east of the Kerkwerve and existed until the 18th century. The village was burnt in 1576 by the Spanish Army.

The Dutch Reformed church is an aisleless church from 1900 with a wooden tower with a slender spire. The church is located on a terp (artificial hill)".

Kerkwerve was home to 233 people in 1840. The village was severely affected by the North Sea flood of 1953.

Kerkwerve was a separate municipality until it was merged with Middenschouwen in 1961. In 1997, it became part of the municipality of Schouwen-Duiveland.

== Gallery ==
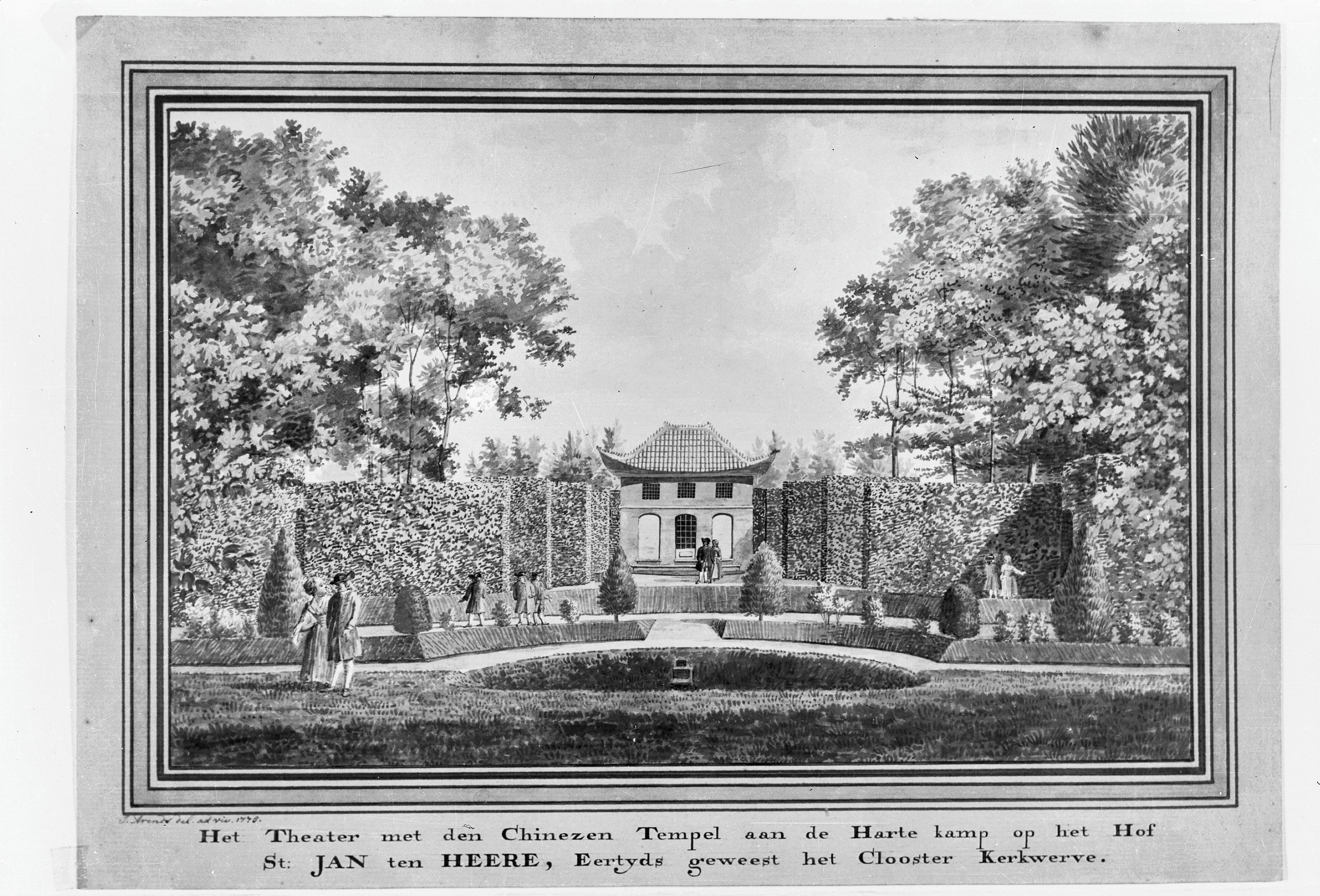
Drawing of the Chinese Temple

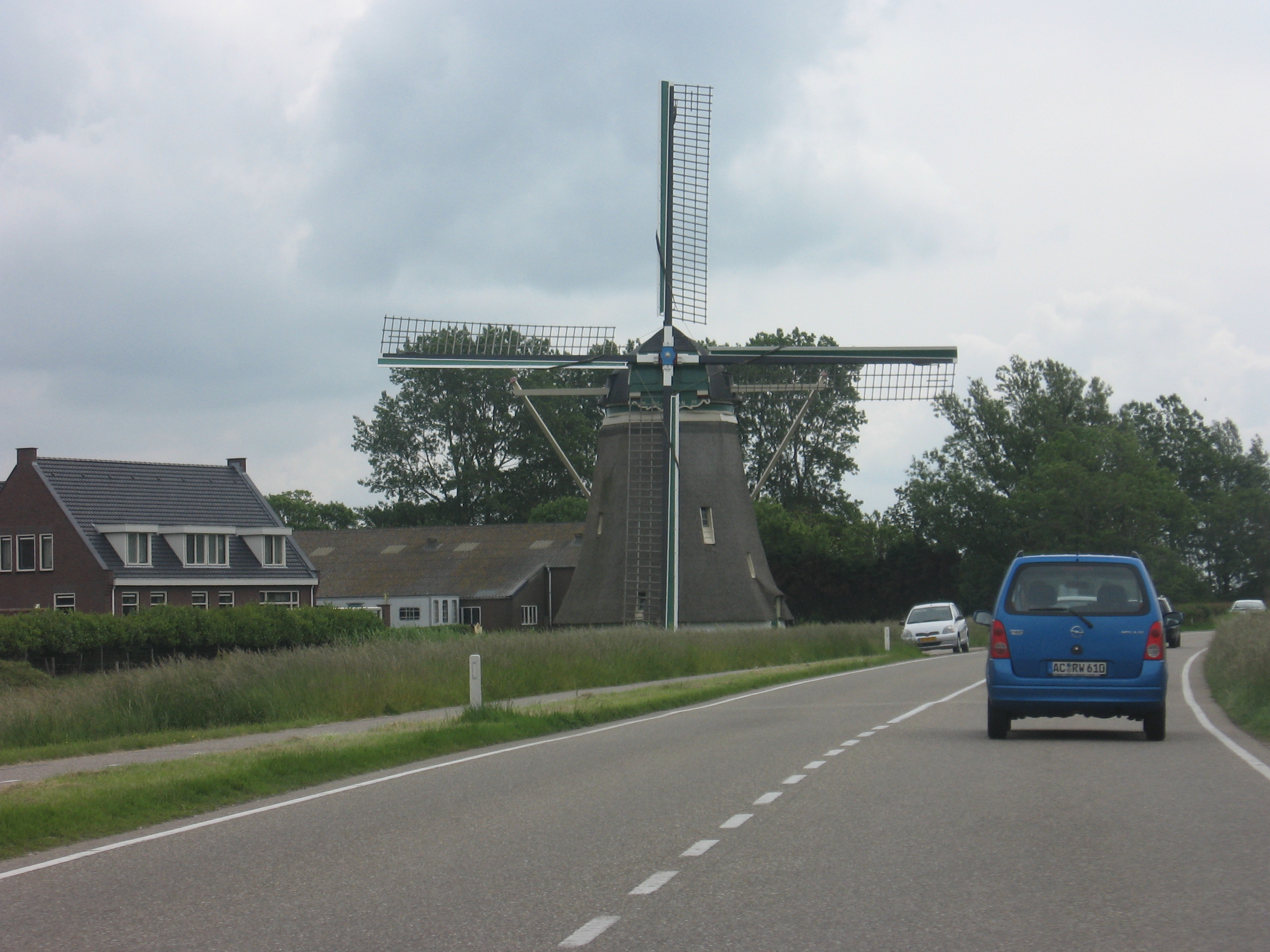
Wind mill De Zwaan
