= Borsele =

Municipality in Zeeland, Netherlands

Borsele Bossele (Zeeuws)
- Municipality
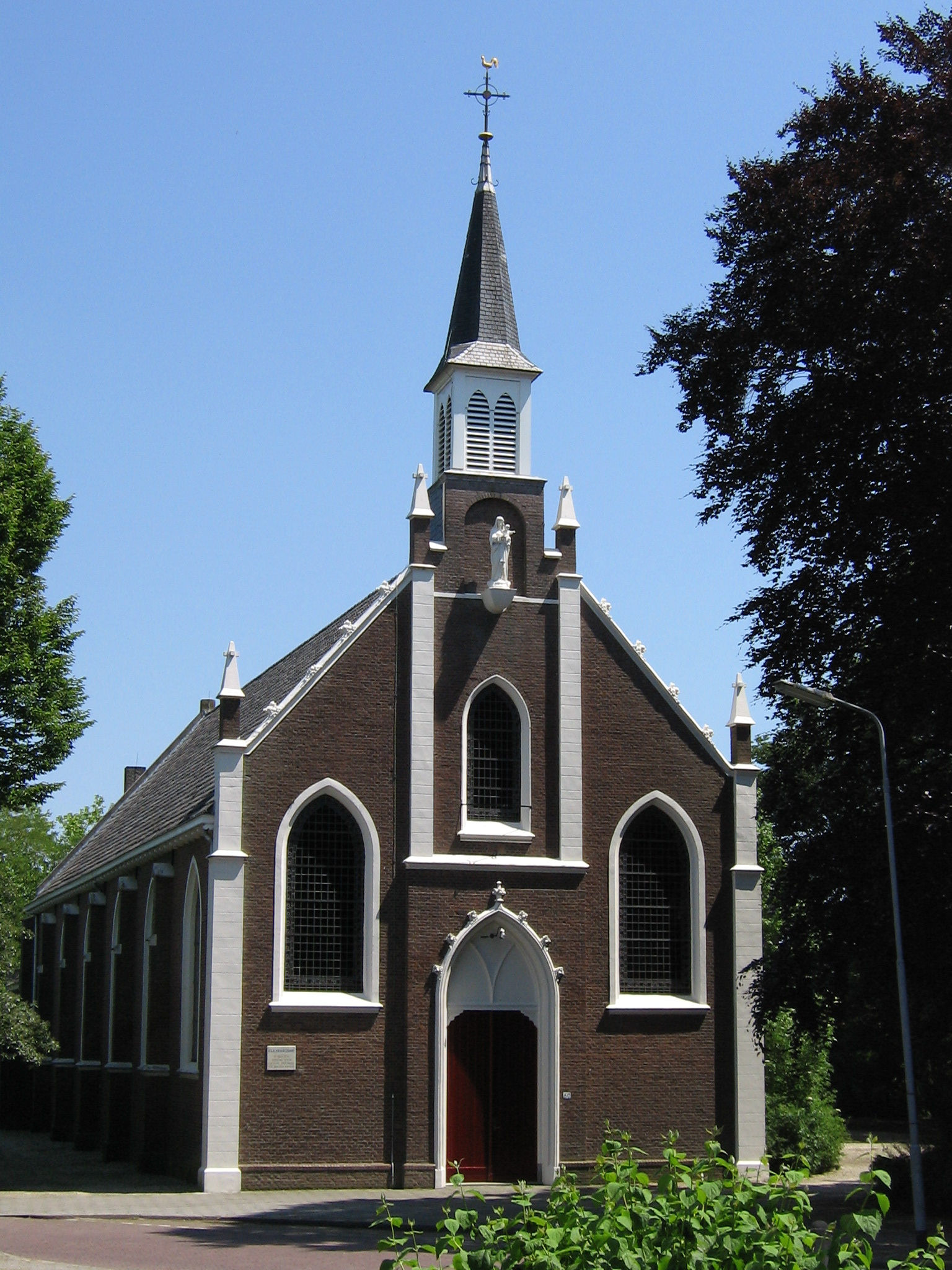
- Church in Ovezande

- Flag Coat of arms

- Location in Zeeland
- Coordinates: 51°26′N 3°49′E
- Country: Netherlands
- Province: Zeeland

Government
  - Body: Municipal council
  - Mayor: Gerben Dijksterhuis (ChristianUnion)

Area
  - Total: 194.52 km^{2} (75.10 sq mi)
  - Land: 141.57 km^{2} (54.66 sq mi)
  - Water: 52.95 km^{2} (20.44 sq mi)
- Elevation: 2 m (6.6 ft)

Population (January 2021)
  - Total: 22,818
  - Density: 161/km^{2} (420/sq mi)
- Demonym: Borsselaar
- Time zone: UTC+1 (CET)
  - Summer (DST): UTC+2 (CEST)
- Postcode: 4430–4456
- Area code: 0113
- Website: borsele.nl

Borsele (Dutch: [ˈbɔrsələ]; Zeeuws: Bossele) is a municipality in the southwestern Netherlands on Zuid-Beveland.

The name of the municipality is spelled with a single s; the name of the eponymous village is Borssele, spelled with double s.

The municipality is mainly known for the Borssele Nuclear Power Station and the Central Storage for Radioactive Waste.

== Population centres ==
- Baarland
- Borssele
- Driewegen
- Ellewoutsdijk
- 's-Gravenpolder
- 's-Heer Abtskerke
- 's-Heerenhoek
- Heinkenszand
- Hoedekenskerke
- Kwadendamme
- Lewedorp
- Nieuwdorp
- Nisse
- Oudelande
- Ovezande.

=== Topography ===
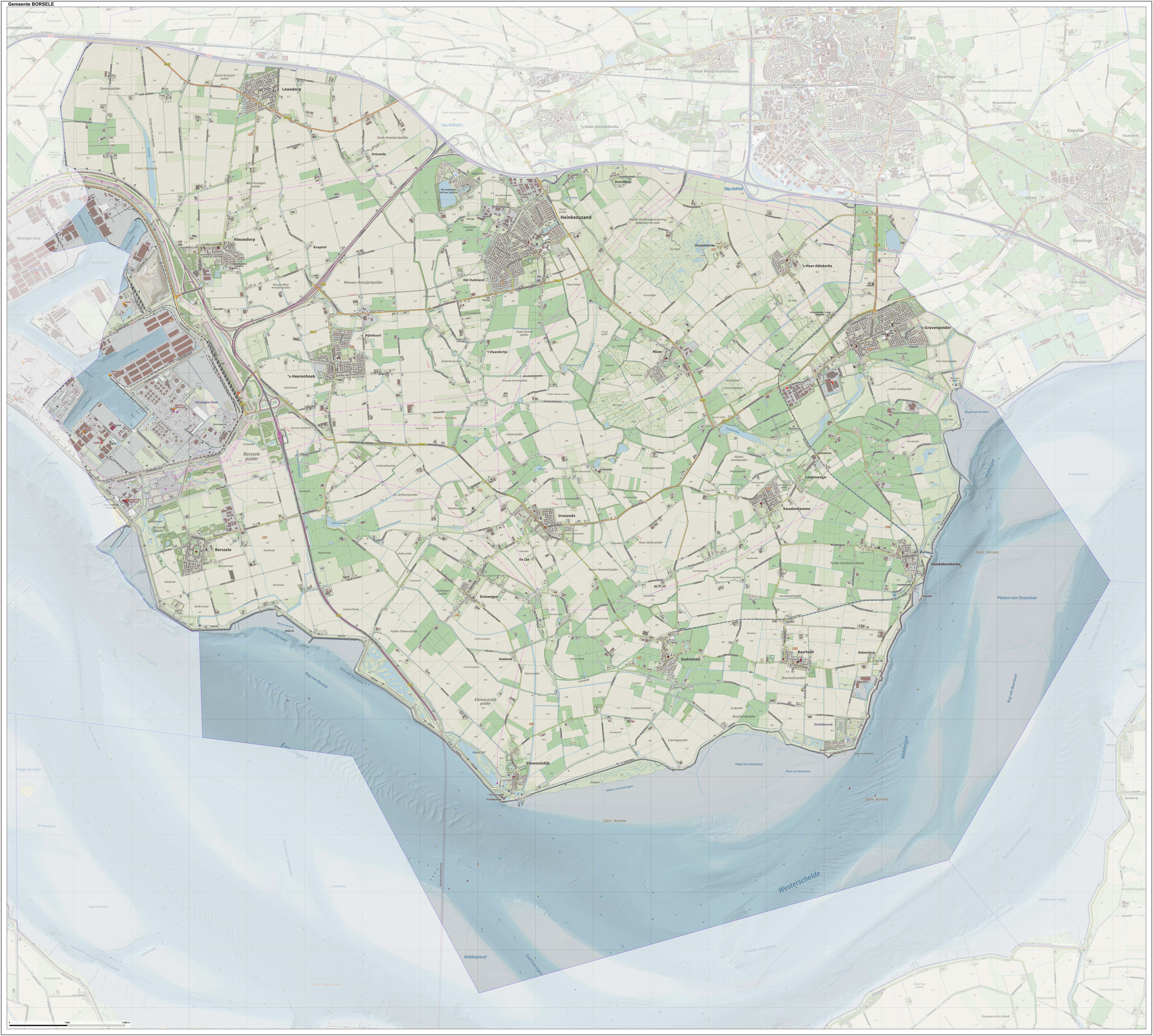
Dutch Topographic map of the municipality of Borsele, June 2015

== Transport ==
The Western Scheldt Tunnel is from Ellewoutsdijk to Terneuzen in Zeelandic Flanders.

== Notable people ==
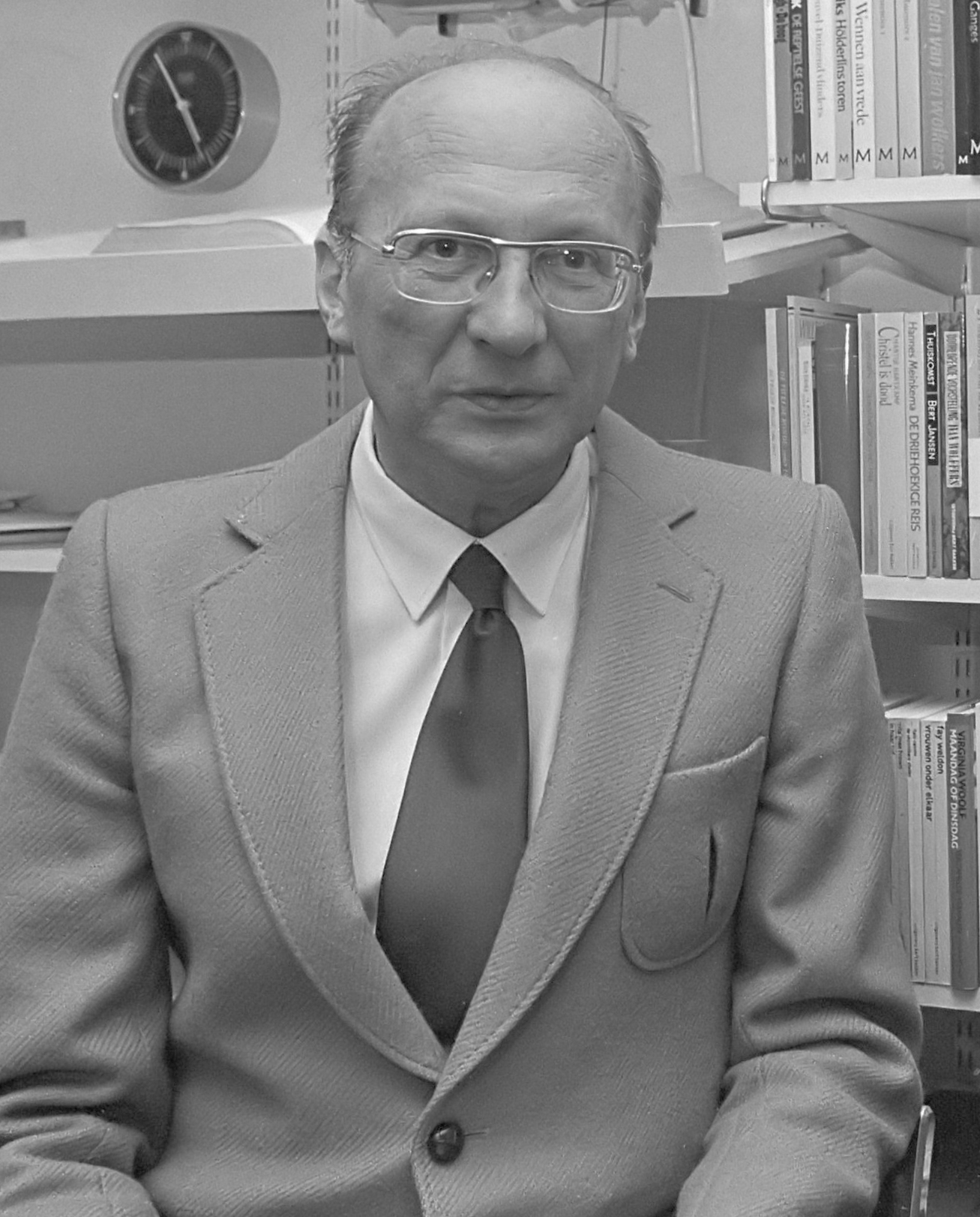
Hans Warren, 1981

- Adrianus Barlandus [1486 in Baarland – 1538) a Dutch historian of merit
- Hans Warren (1921 in Borssele – 2001) a Dutch writer

=== Sport ===
- Dingenis de Wilde (1885 in Heinkenszand – 1947) a Dutch sports shooter, competed at the 1924 Summer Olympics
- Cees Priem (born 1950 in Ovezande) a retired professional road bicycle racer, competed at the 1972 Summer Olympics
- Jan Raas (born 1952 in Heinkenszand, near Goes) a Dutch former professional cyclist
- Angelique van der Meet (born 1991 in 's-Heer Abtskerke) a Dutch tennis player

== Gallery ==
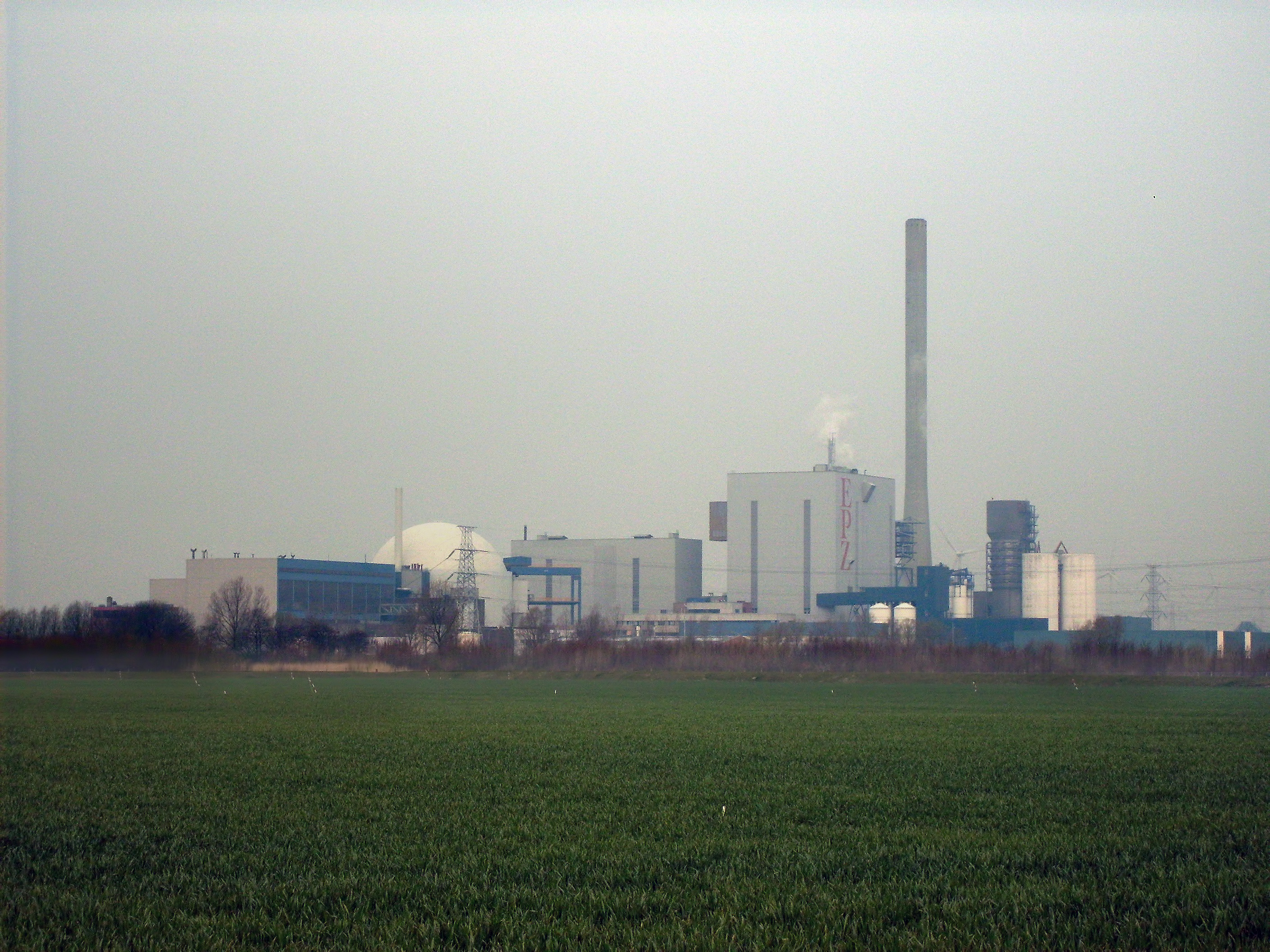
Borssele Nuclear Power Plant

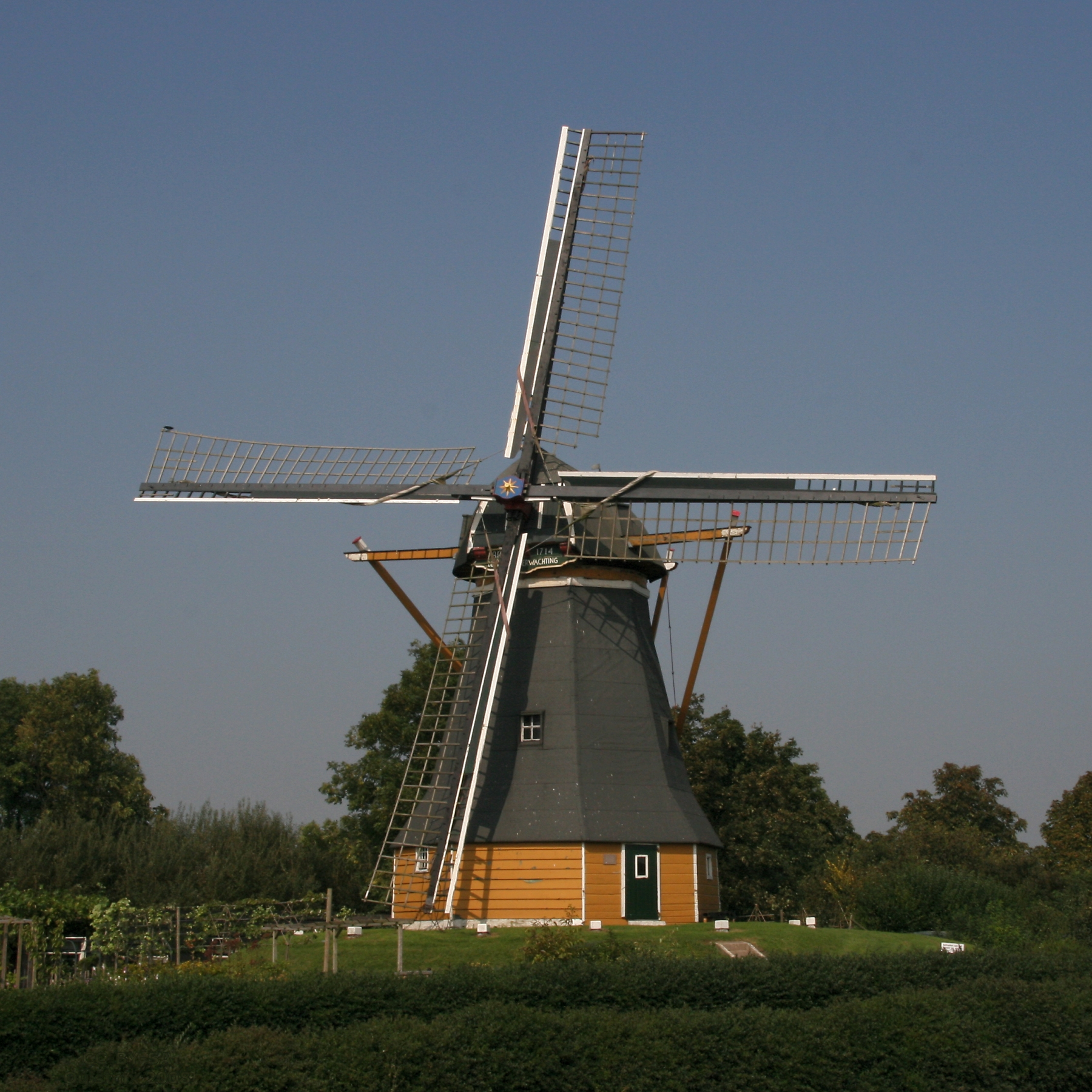
Borssele - De Hoop en Verwachting

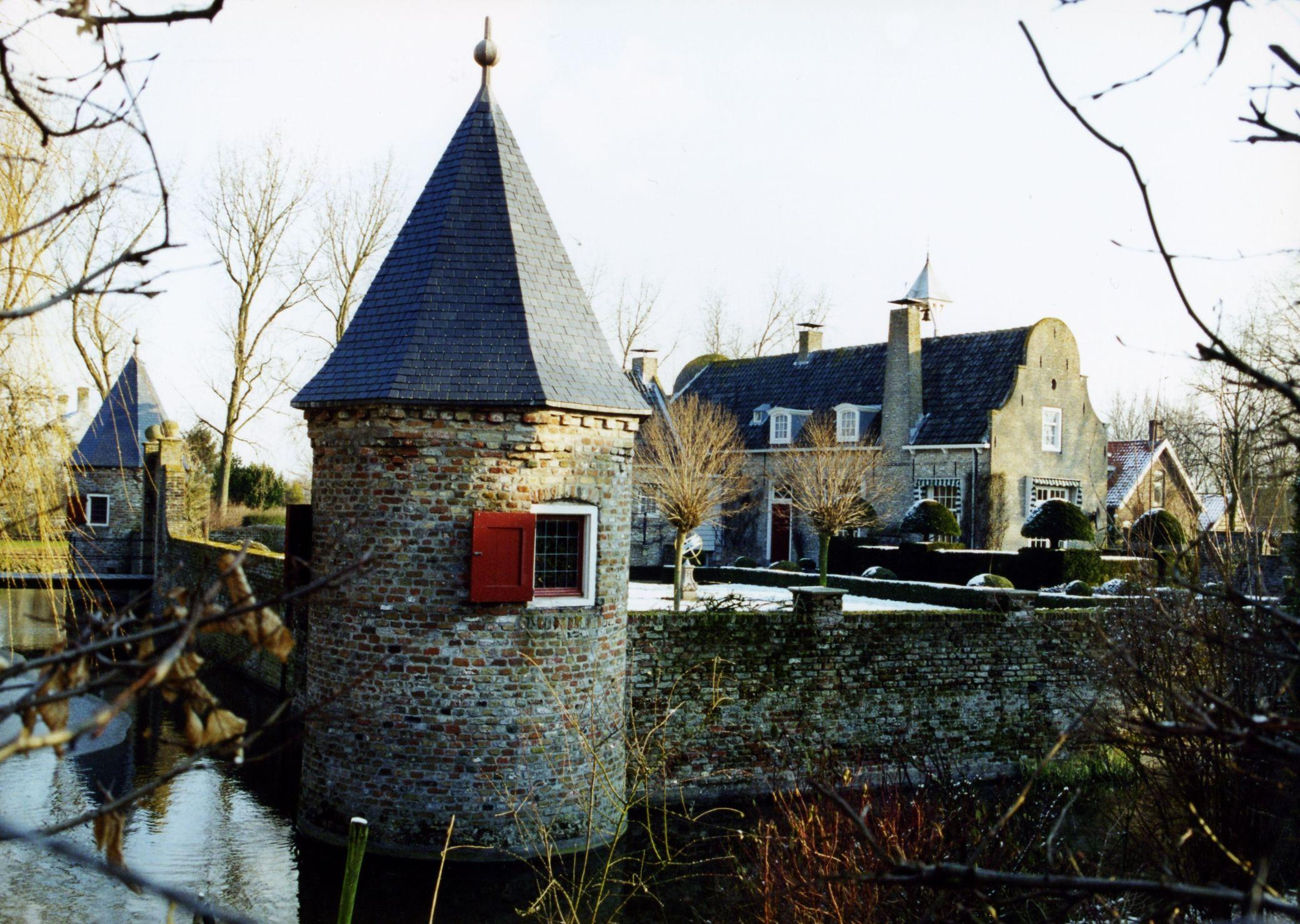
't Hof te Baarland te Baarland

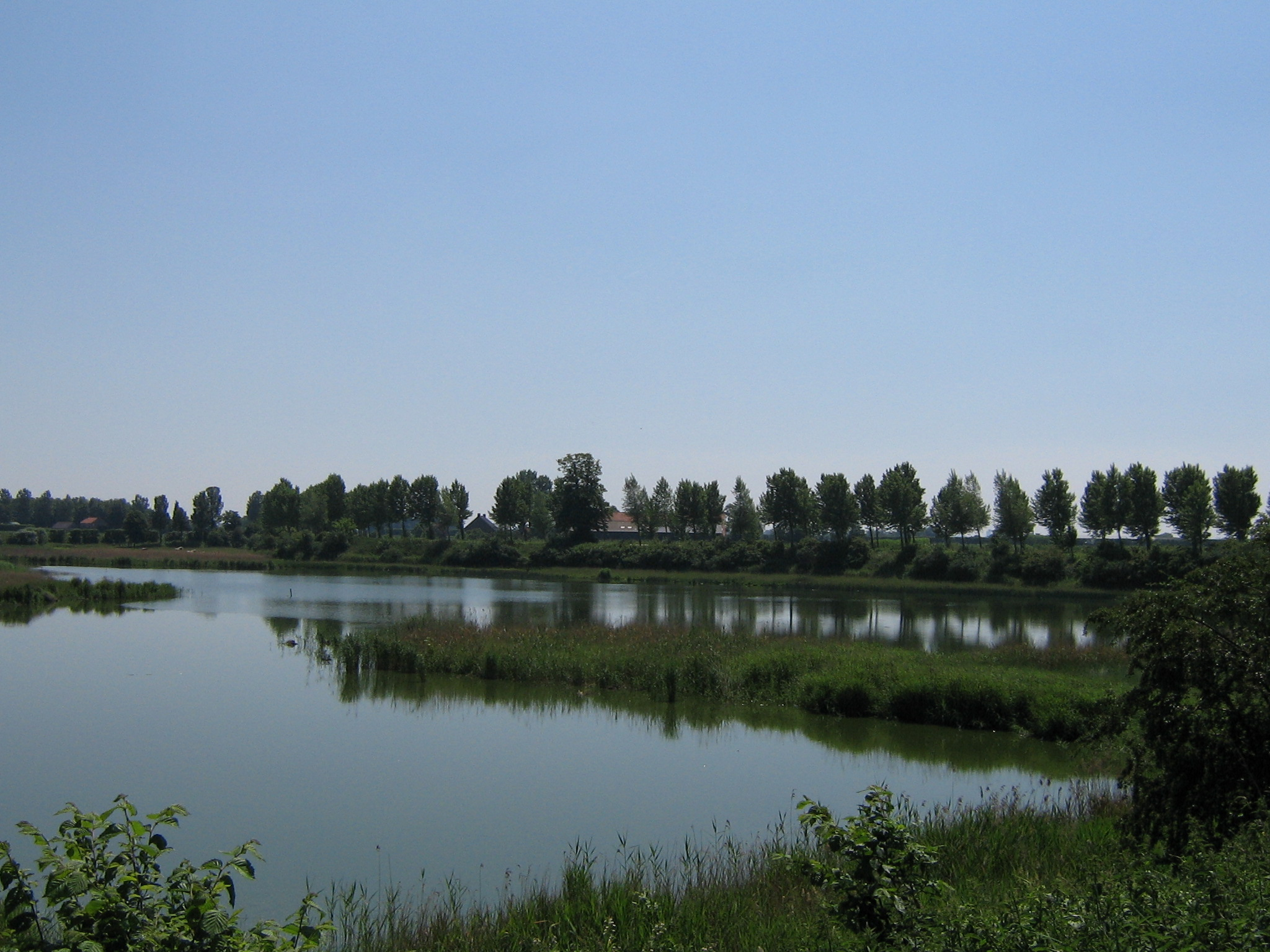
Wiel, showing a pool resulting from a dike breach and subsequent re-empoldering.
