= Driewegen, Borsele =

Driewegen
- Village
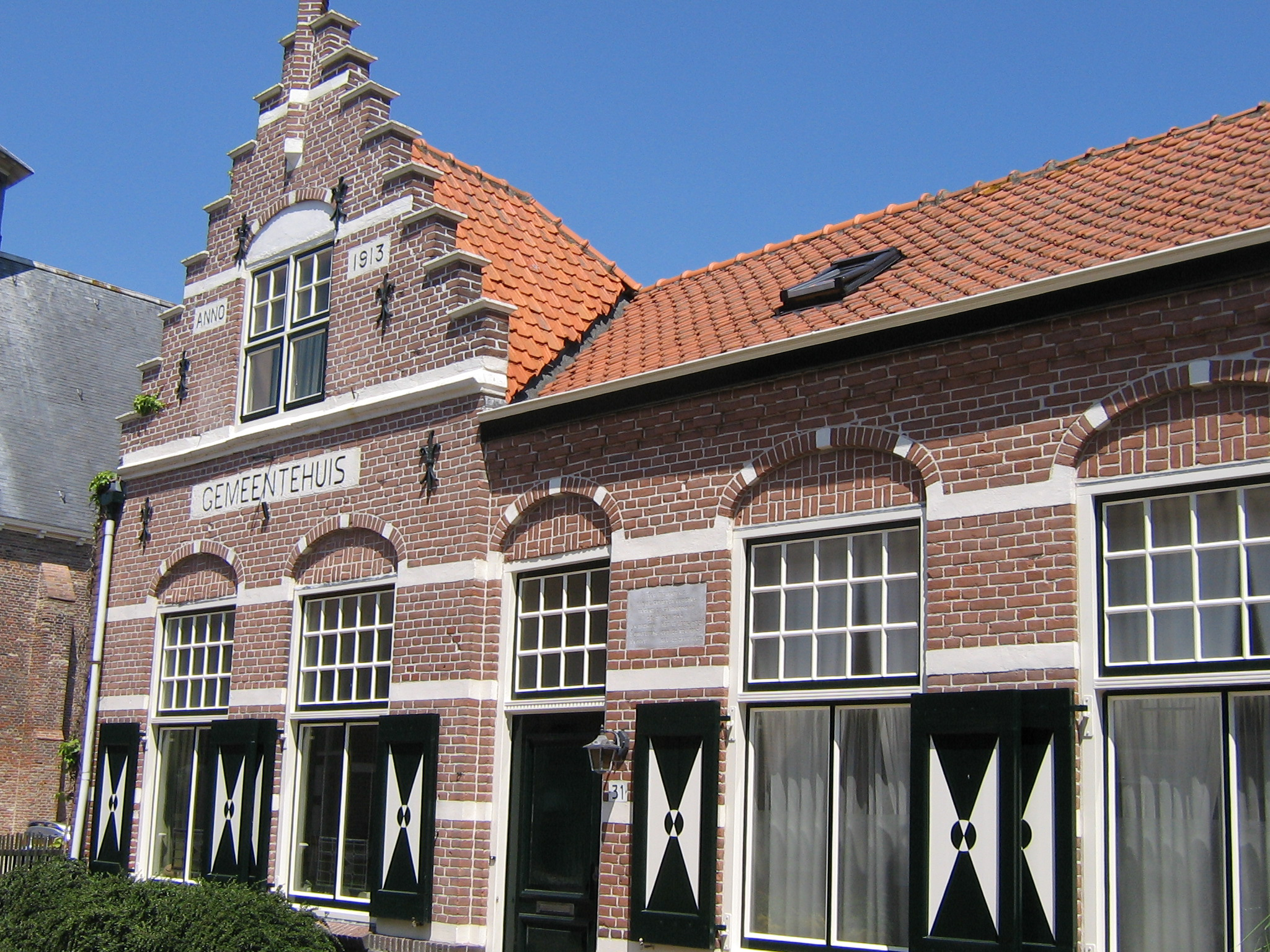
- Former town hall

- Coat of arms

- Location in the province of Zeeland in the Netherlands Driewegen (Netherlands)
- Coordinates: 51°25′3″N 3°48′12″E
- Country: Netherlands
- Province: Zeeland
- Municipality: Borsele

Area
  - Total: 6.18 km^{2} (2.39 sq mi)
- Elevation: 1.3 m (4.3 ft)

Population (2021)
  - Total: 560
  - Density: 91/km^{2} (230/sq mi)
- Time zone: UTC+1 (CET)
  - Summer (DST): UTC+2 (CEST)
- Postal code: 4438
- Dialing code: 0113

Driewegen is a village in the Dutch province of Zeeland. It is a part of the municipality of Borsele, and lies about 16 km southeast of Middelburg. Until 1970 it was an independent municipality.

== History ==
The village was first mentioned in 1505 as ten Drienwegen, and means intersection of three roads. The polder which contains Driewegen was created around 1300, and a village has been known to exist since 1351.

The Dutch Reformed church was built in 1678. The interior of the church was modified during the restoration of 1911 until 1914. The former town hall was located in a modified school building from 1913.

Driewegen was home to 443 people in 1840. In 1927, a joint railway station with Ovezande was built on the Goes to Hoedekenskerke railway line. It closed in 1934.

Driewegen was an independent municipality until 1970 when it was merged into Borsele.

== Gallery ==
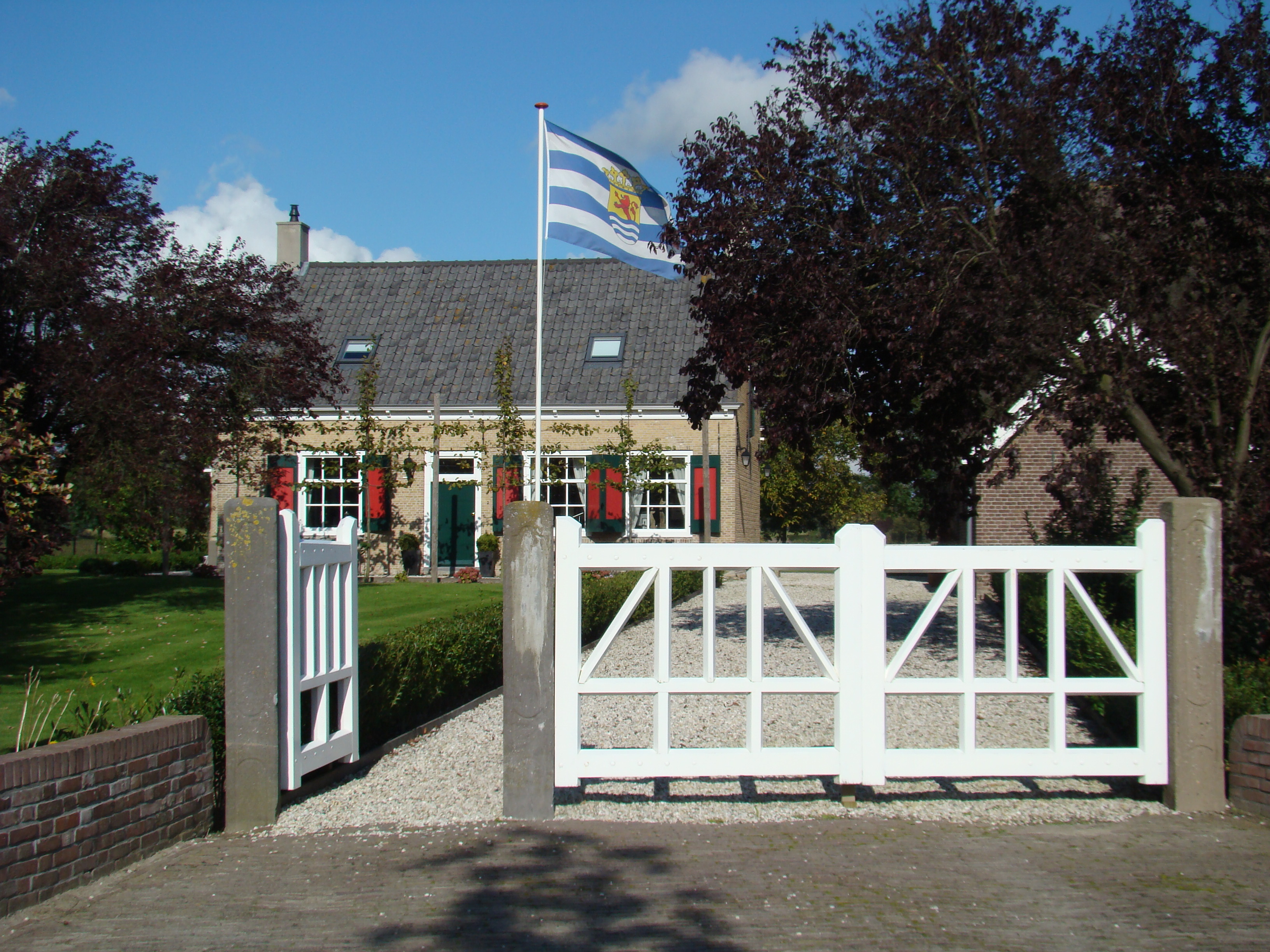
Farm Geertruidshoeve

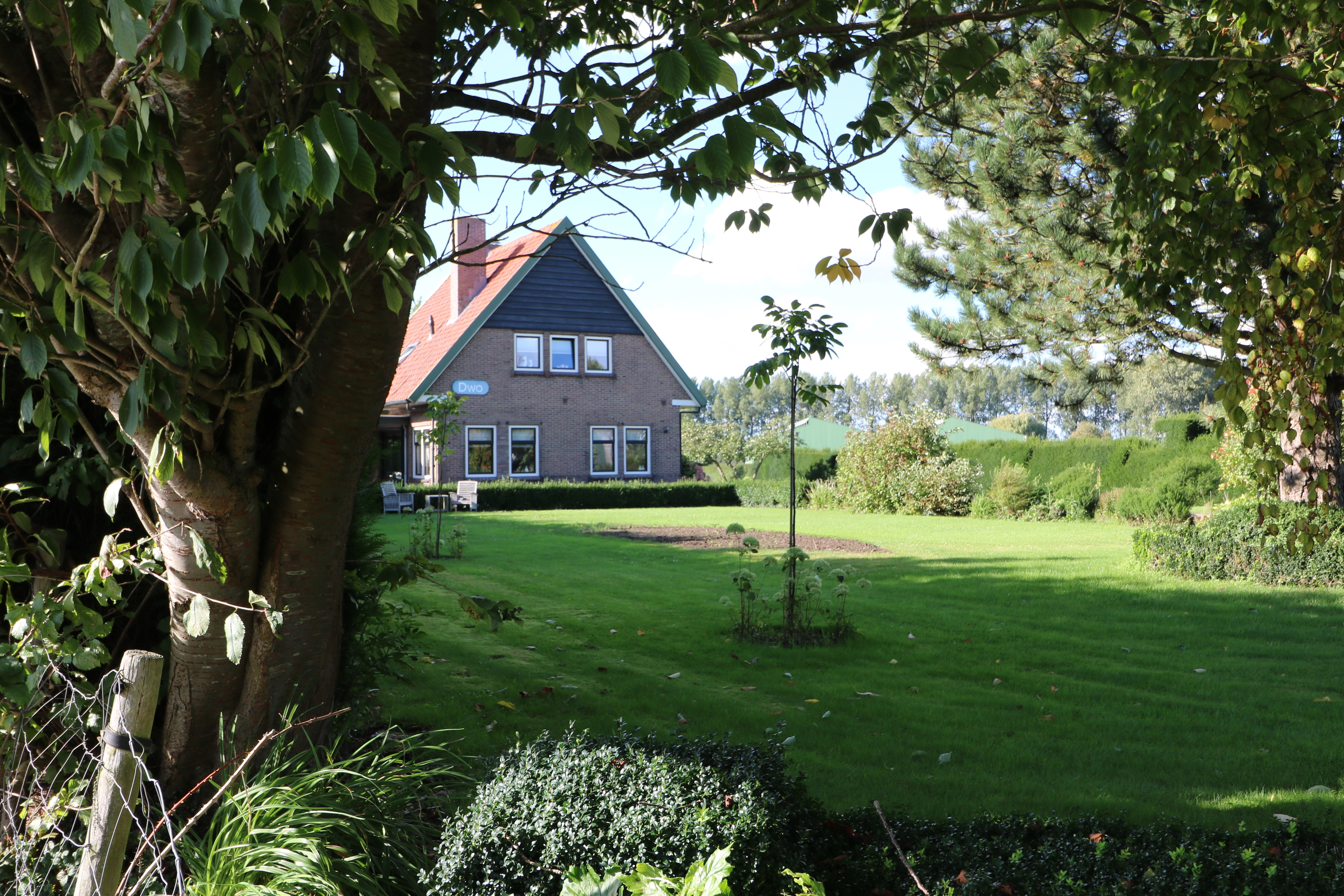
Former railway station

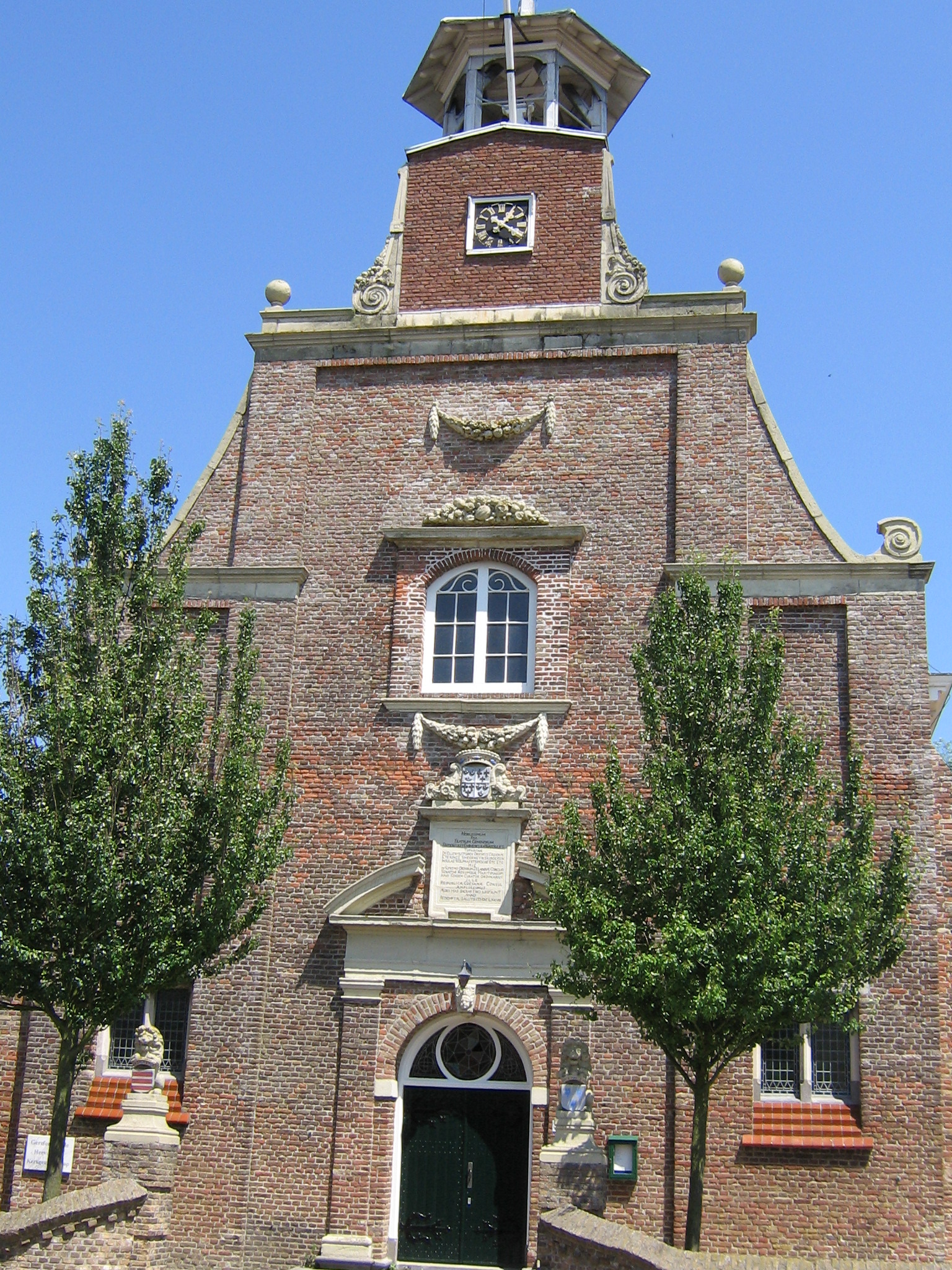
Dutch Reformed church
