= Lewedorp =

- Village
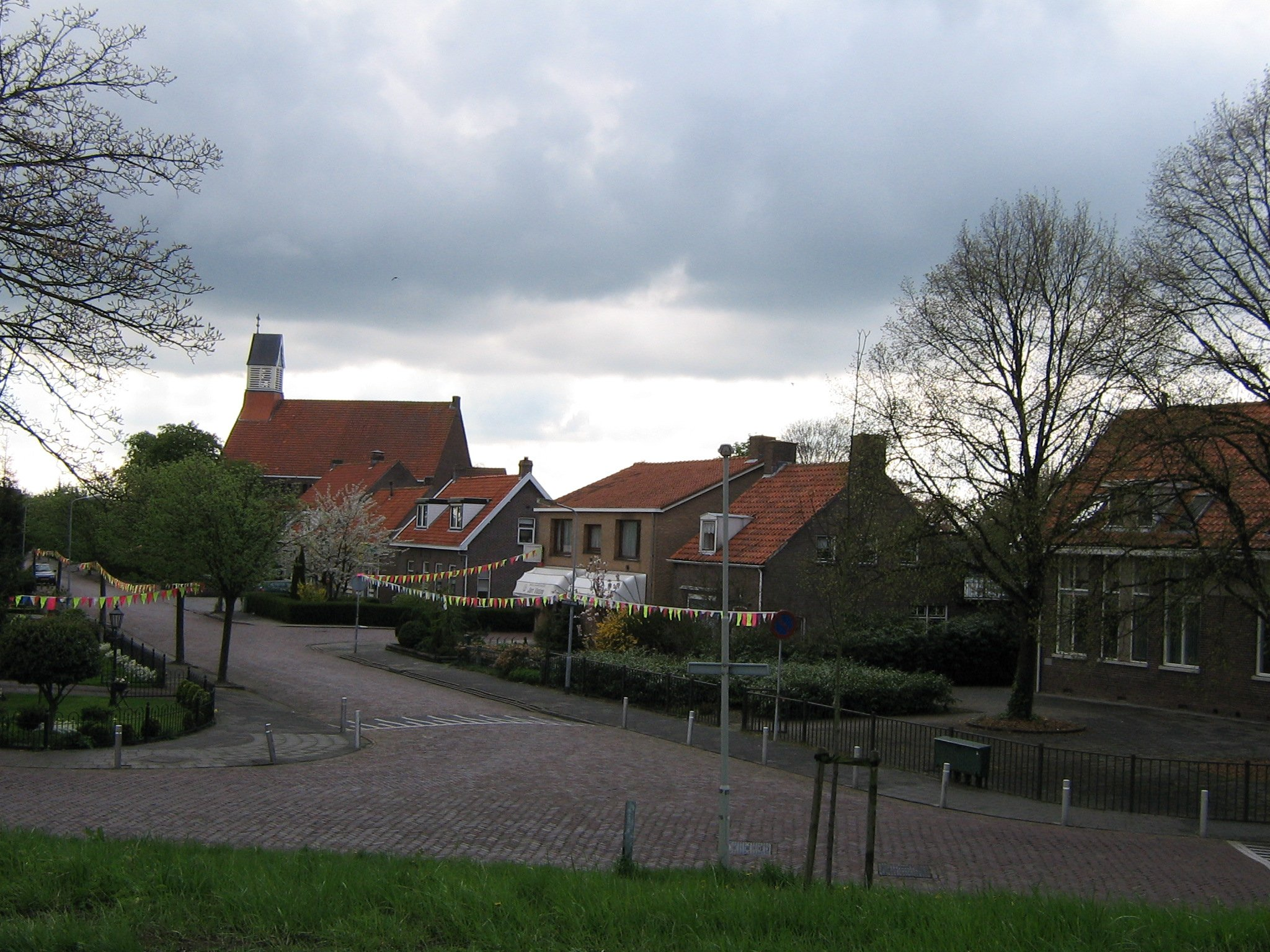

- Flag

- Location in the province of Zeeland in the Netherlands Lewedorp (Netherlands)
- Coordinates: 51°29′43″N 3°44′57″E
- Country: Netherlands
- Province: Zeeland
- Municipality: Borsele

Area
  - Total: 14.72 km^{2} (5.68 sq mi)
- Elevation: 1.5 m (4.9 ft)

Population (2021)
  - Total: 1,735
  - Density: 117.9/km^{2} (305.3/sq mi)
- Time zone: UTC+1 (CET)
  - Summer (DST): UTC+2 (CEST)
- Postal code: 4456
- Dialing code: 0113

Lewedorp is a village in the Dutch province of Zeeland. It is a part of the municipality of Borsele, and lies about 9 km east of Middelburg.

The village was first mentioned in 1913 as Noordkraaijert. It was renamed on 13 August 1929 and refers to Unico Evert Lewe van Neijenstein, the mayor of 's-Heer Arendskerke between 1892 until 1933. The village used to be located near the ferry to Zuid-Beveland and Walcheren which operated from 1755 until 1872.

The Catholic St Eligius Church was built in 1929 and designed by Pierre Cuypers jr.. Lewedorp used to be part of 's-Heer Arendskerke until 1970 when it was merged into Borsele.

== Gallery ==
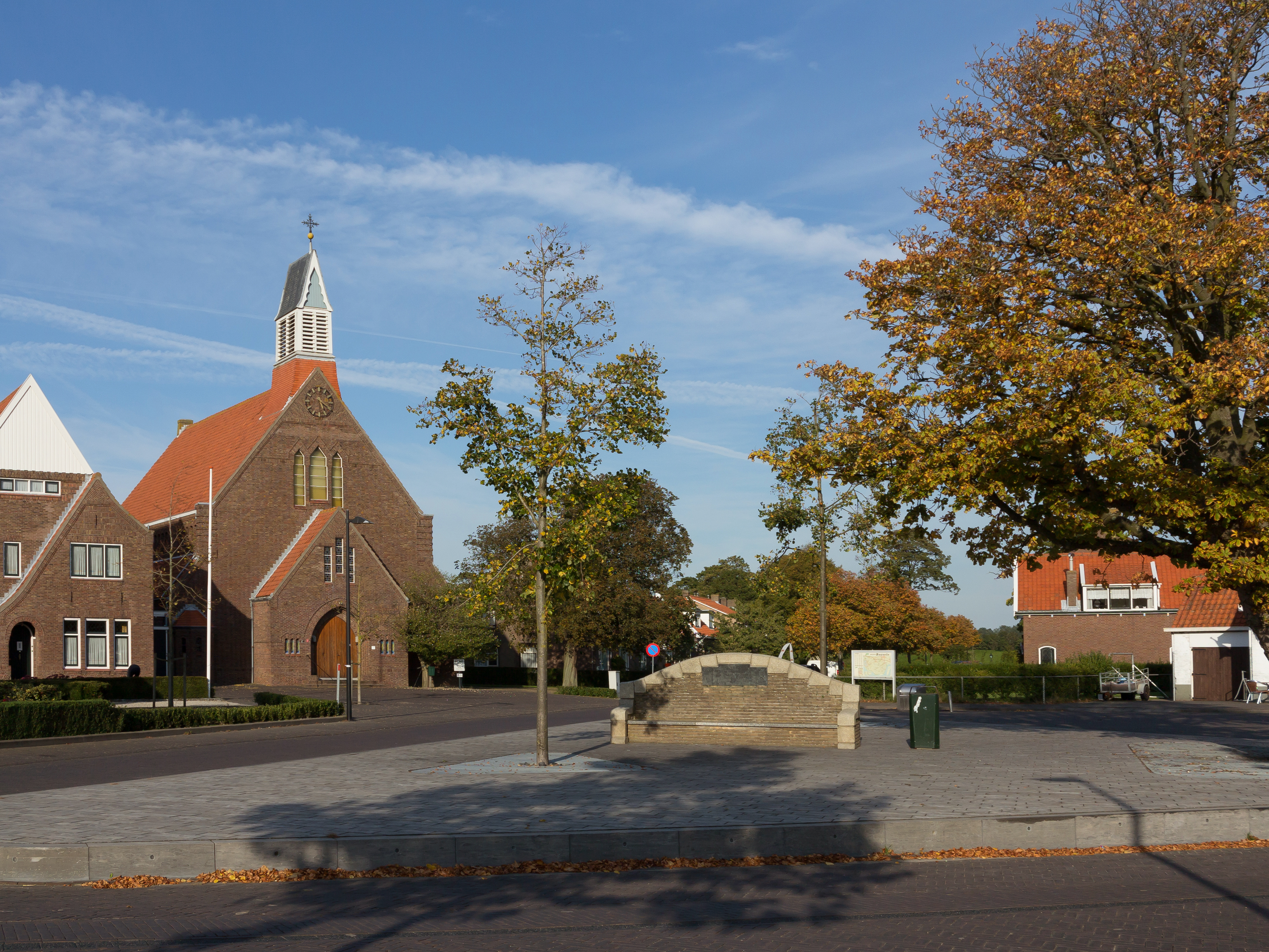
View on the church

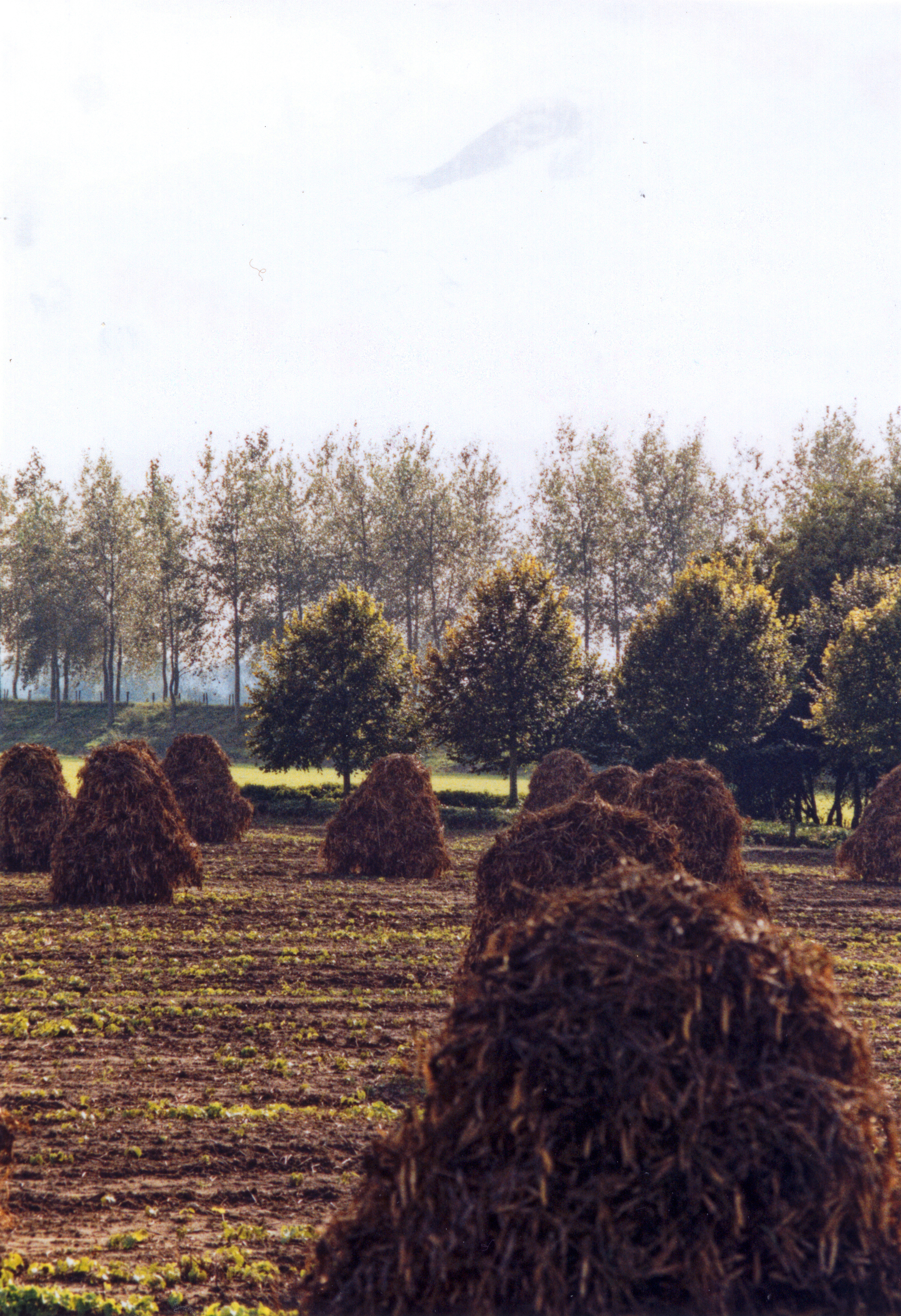
Hay in the fields
