= Nisse, Netherlands =

Nisse
- Village
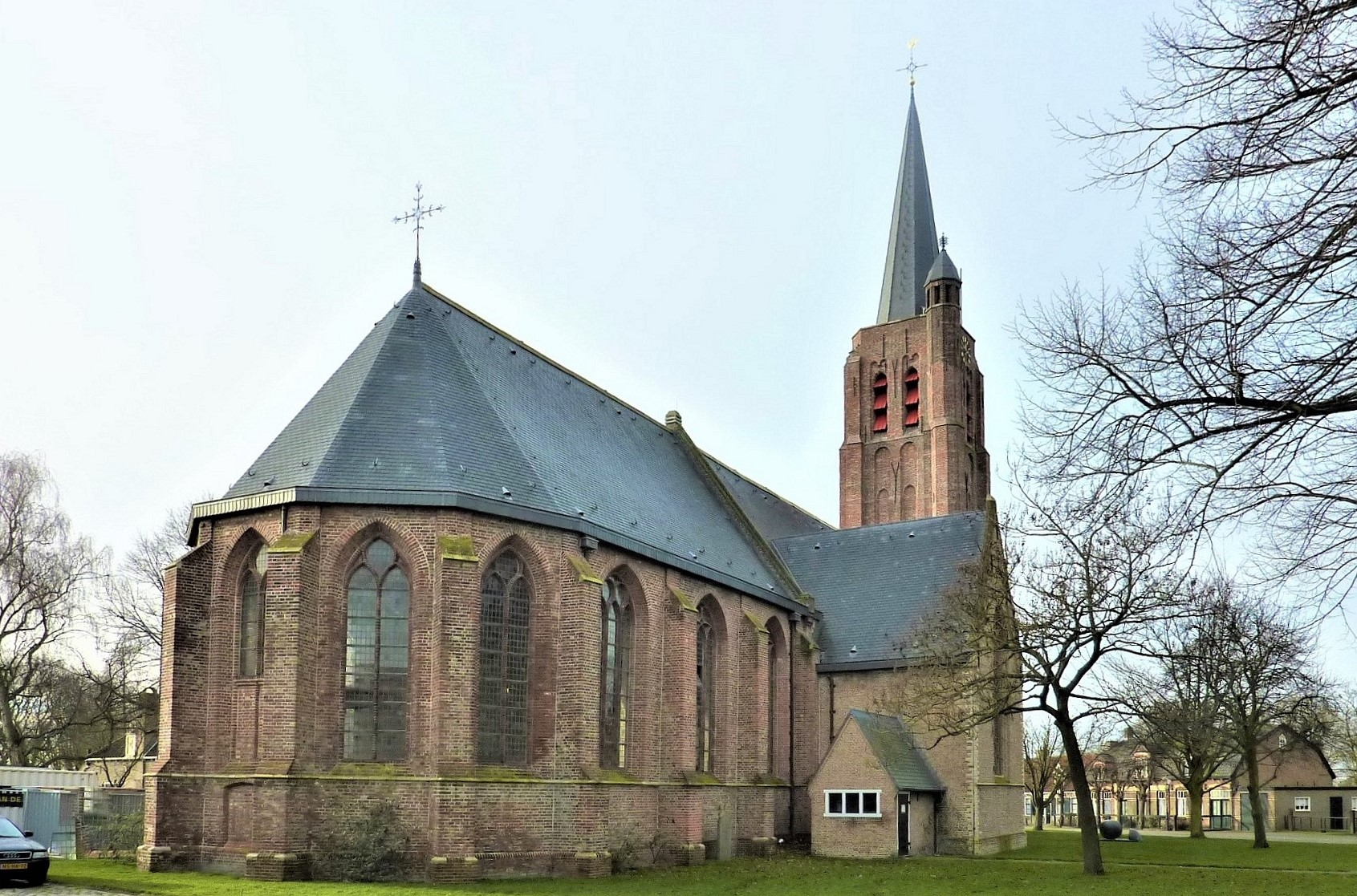
- Mary Church

- Coat of arms

- Location in the province of Zeeland in the Netherlands Nisse (Netherlands)
- Coordinates: 51°27′19″N 3°51′6″E
- Country: Netherlands
- Province: Zeeland
- Municipality: Borsele

Area
  - Total: 9.98 km^{2} (3.85 sq mi)
- Elevation: 0.9 m (3.0 ft)

Population (2021)
  - Total: 615
  - Density: 61.6/km^{2} (160/sq mi)
- Time zone: UTC+1 (CET)
  - Summer (DST): UTC+2 (CEST)
- Postal code: 4443
- Dialing code: 0113

Nisse is a village in the Dutch province of Zeeland. It is a part of the municipality of Borsele, which has approximately 22,500 inhabitants, and lies about 17 km east of Middelburg.

Nisse was a separate municipality until 1970, when it was merged with Borsele.

Nisse is one of seventeen protected city- and village views in Zeeland. There is a 15th-century church with 14th-century tower, containing frescoes and wood carvings. The village square, restored in 1975, has a bandstand, an 18th-century water pump and a vaete - a waterhole formerly used by cattle, now commonly in use as a duck pond.

Nisse's surrounding countryside consists of meadows with hawthorn hedges and welen - a type of open water - and is loved by both hikers and cyclists. Fruit cultivation is the most practiced form of agriculture.

Yearly events include a jumble sale with proceeds going to the local church, the music festival Pastorale au Parvis, the running competition Meidoornloop, and village fête Schaapscheerdersfeest, until the latter's cancellation in 2011 and subsequent years.

== Gallery ==
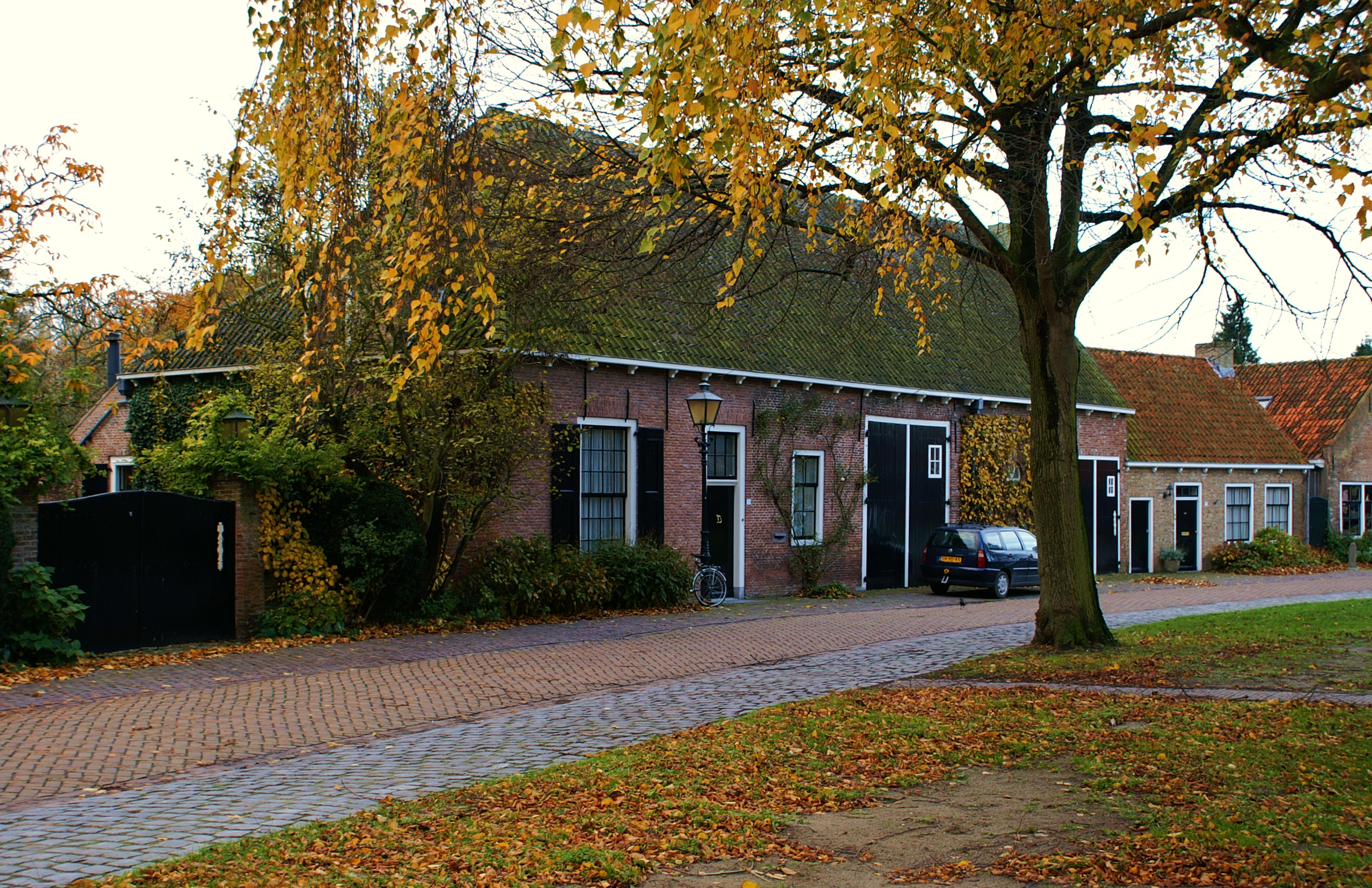
Farm in Nisse

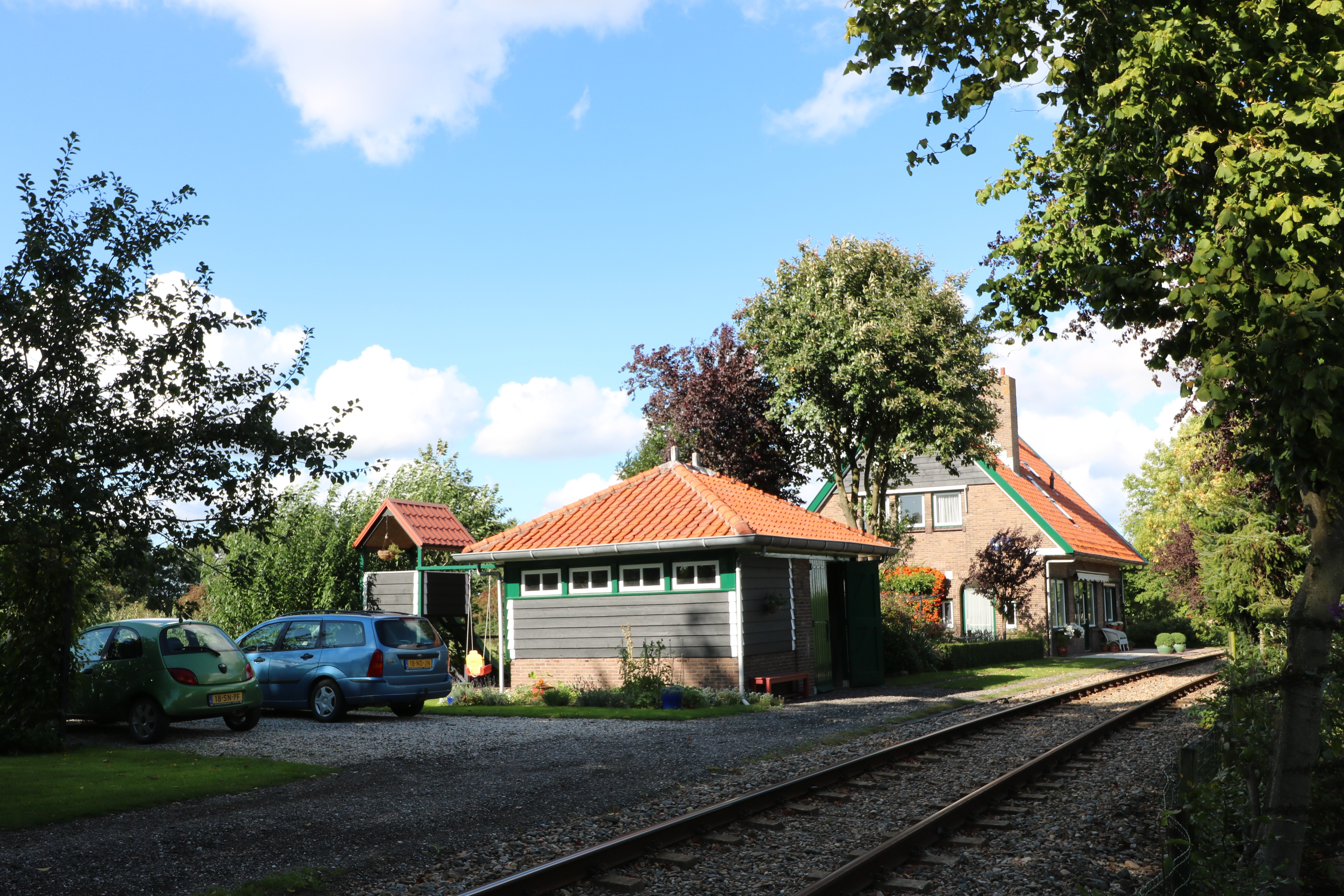
Former railway station

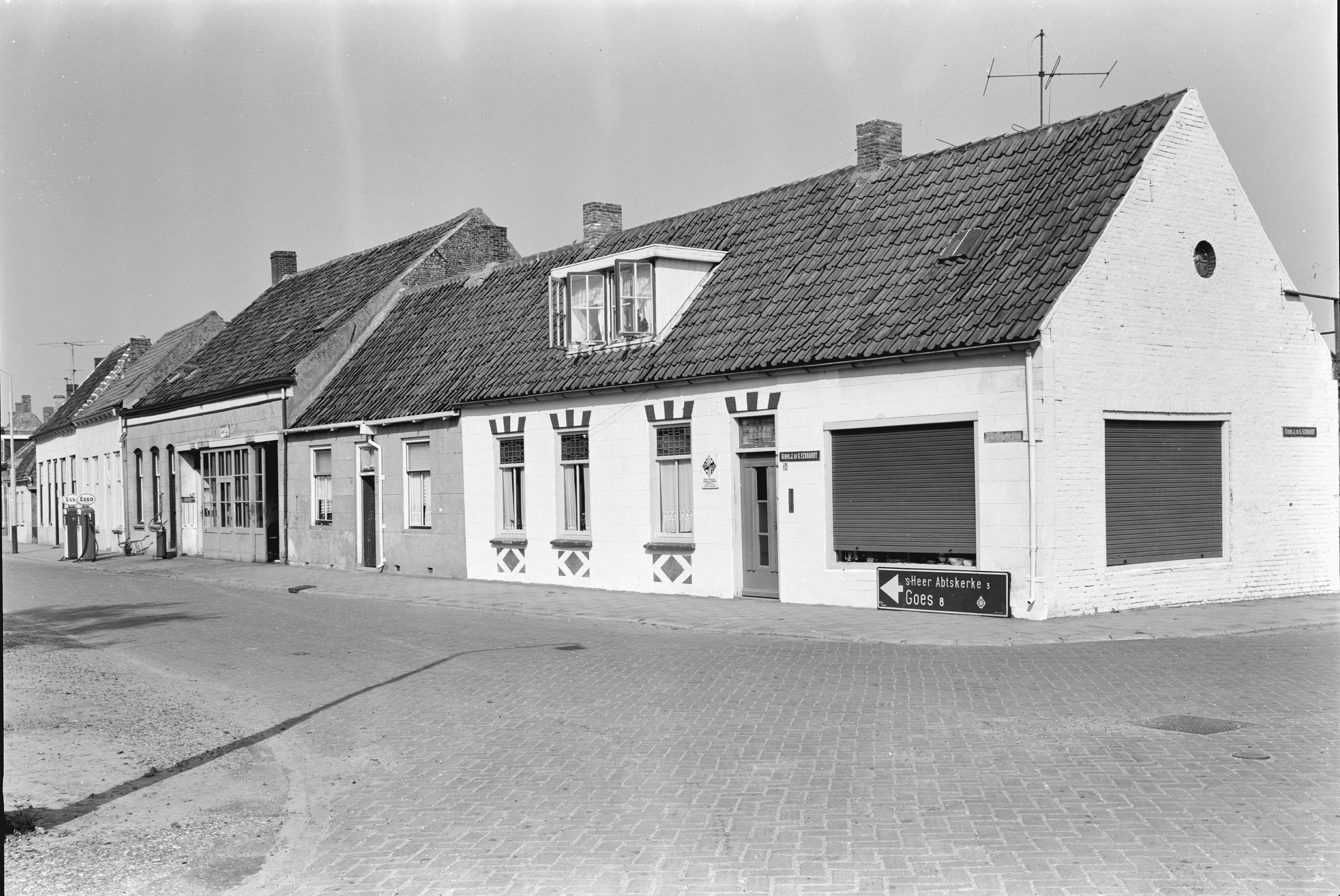
Street view (1964)
