= Kwadendamme =

- Village
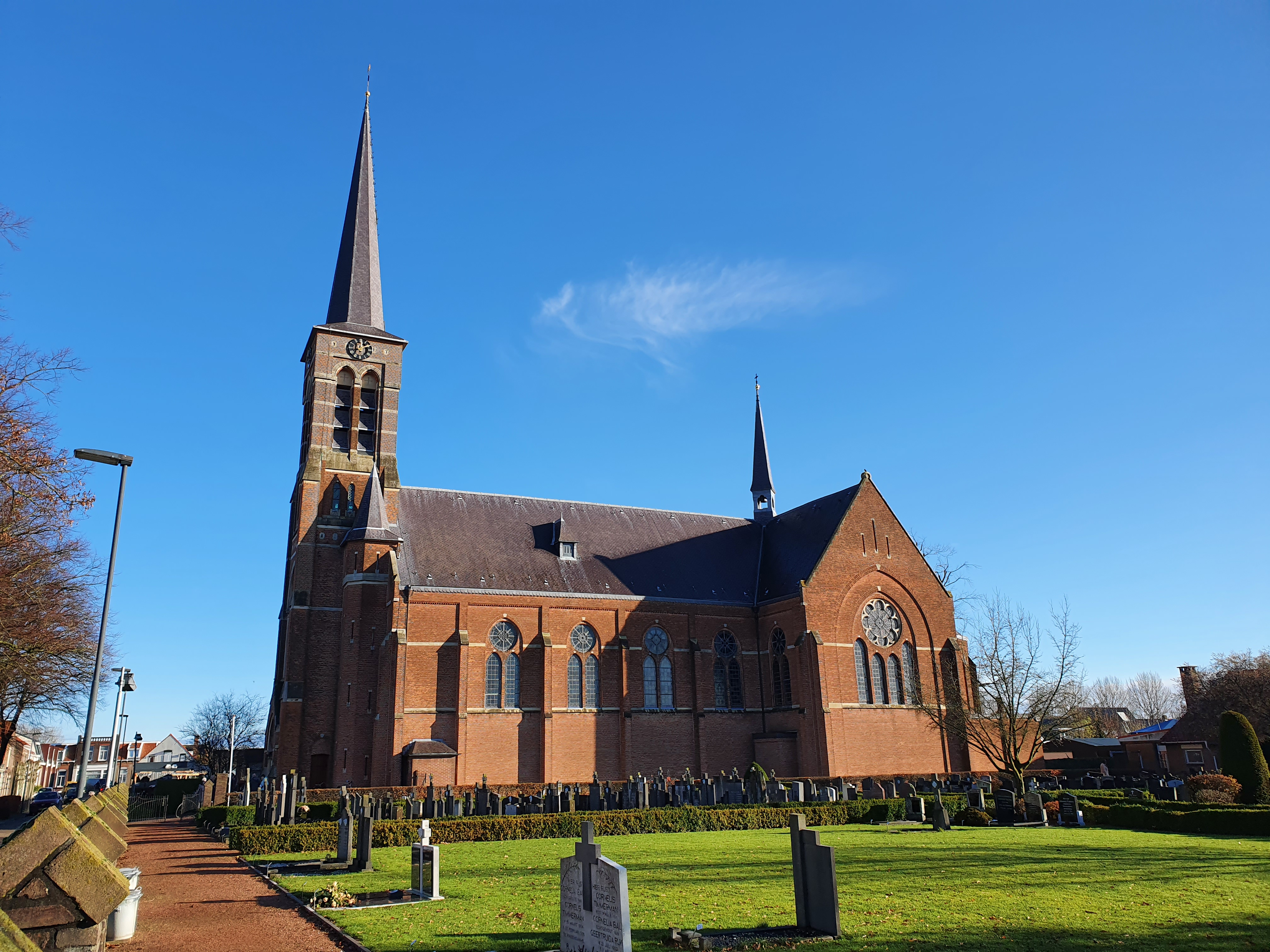
- St Bonifatius Church

- Location in the province of Zeeland in the Netherlands Kwadendamme (Netherlands)
- Coordinates: 51°26′0″N 3°52′39″E
- Country: Netherlands
- Province: Zeeland
- Municipality: Borsele

Area
  - Total: 6.40 km^{2} (2.47 sq mi)
- Elevation: 1.1 m (3.6 ft)

Population (2021)
  - Total: 950
  - Density: 150/km^{2} (380/sq mi)
- Time zone: UTC+1 (CET)
  - Summer (DST): UTC+2 (CEST)
- Postal code: 4434
- Dialing code: 0113

Kwadendamme is a village in the Dutch province of Zeeland. It is a part of the municipality of Borsele, and lies about 20 km east of Middelburg.

== History ==
The village was first mentioned in 1581 as "Huybrecht Crijnsz. van Quaendamme", and means "dam which is in bad shape". Kwadendamme is dike village which developed in the Late Middle Ages on the dike between Oud- and Nieuw-Vreelandsepolder.

The St Bonifatius Church was built between 1901 and 1902. In 1938, the tower was replaced by a tall needle spire after the original was damaged in a storm of 1919. The church was damaged by war in 1945.

Kwadendamme was home to 358 people in 1840. A railway station was opened in 1927 on the Goes to Hoedekenskerke railway line. It closed in 1947.

Berkenhof Tropical Zoo is a small zoo with more than 40 animals species. It specifically designed for children.

== Gallery ==
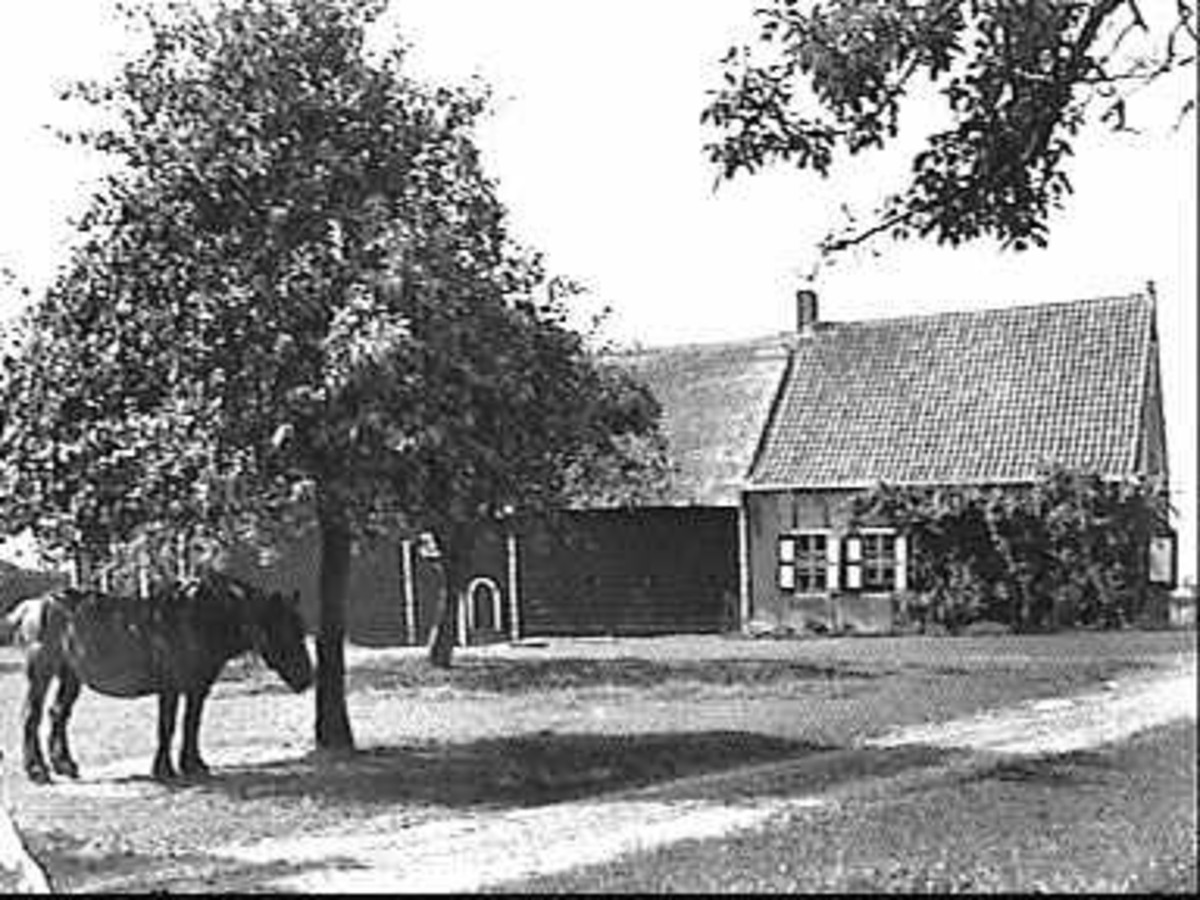
Farm in Kwadendamme (1964)

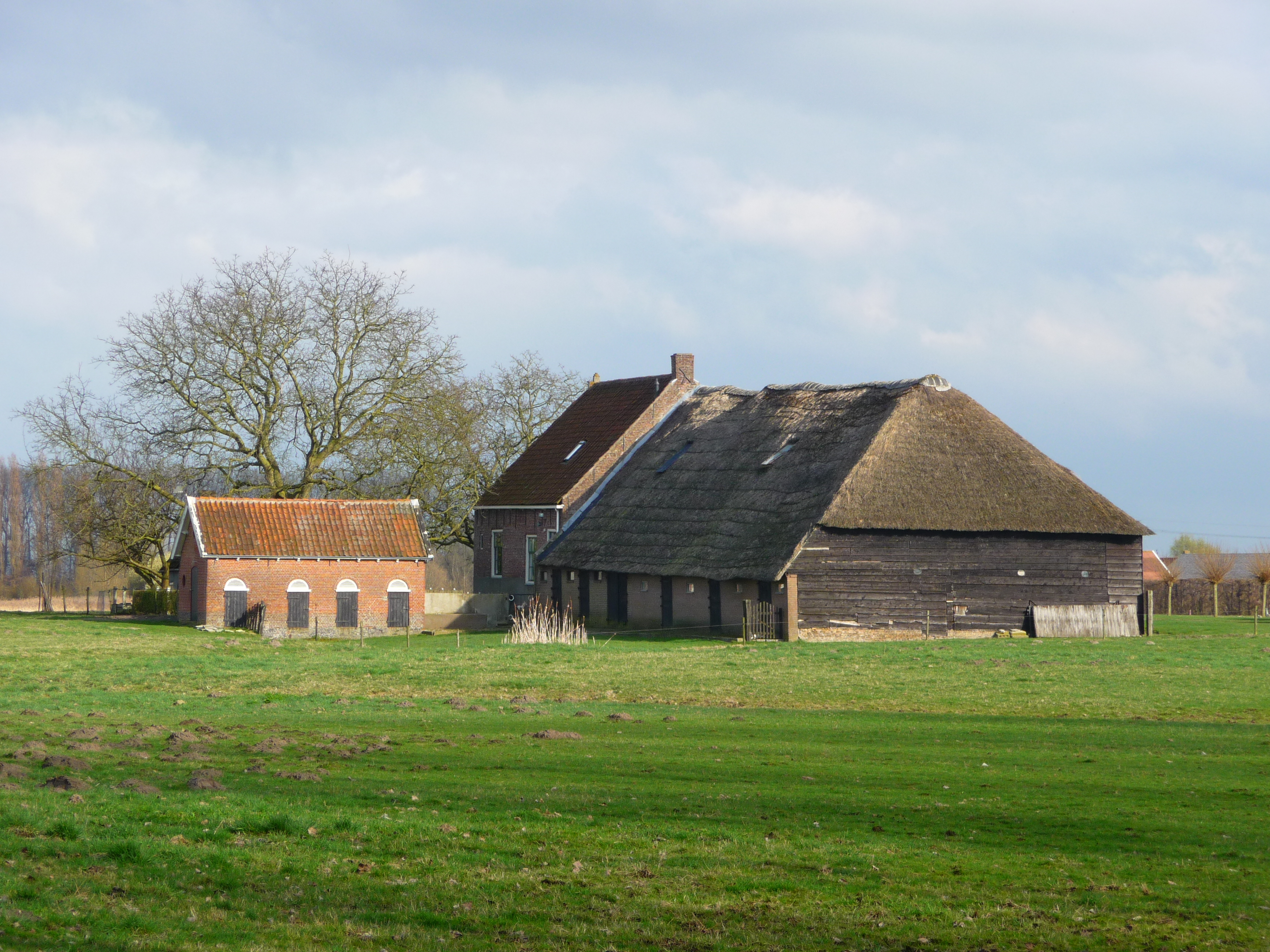
Farm in Kwadendamme

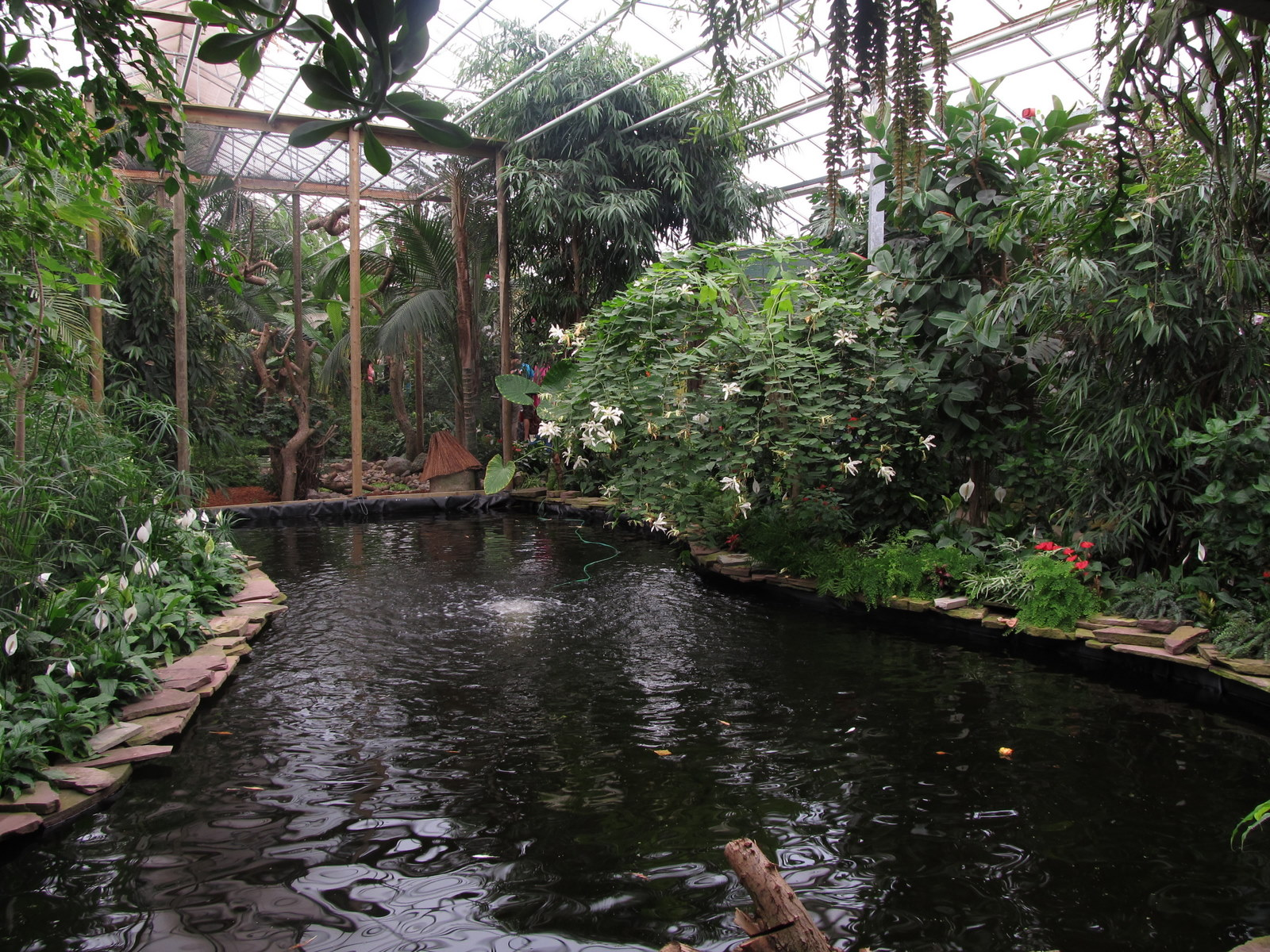
Berkenhof Tropical Zoo

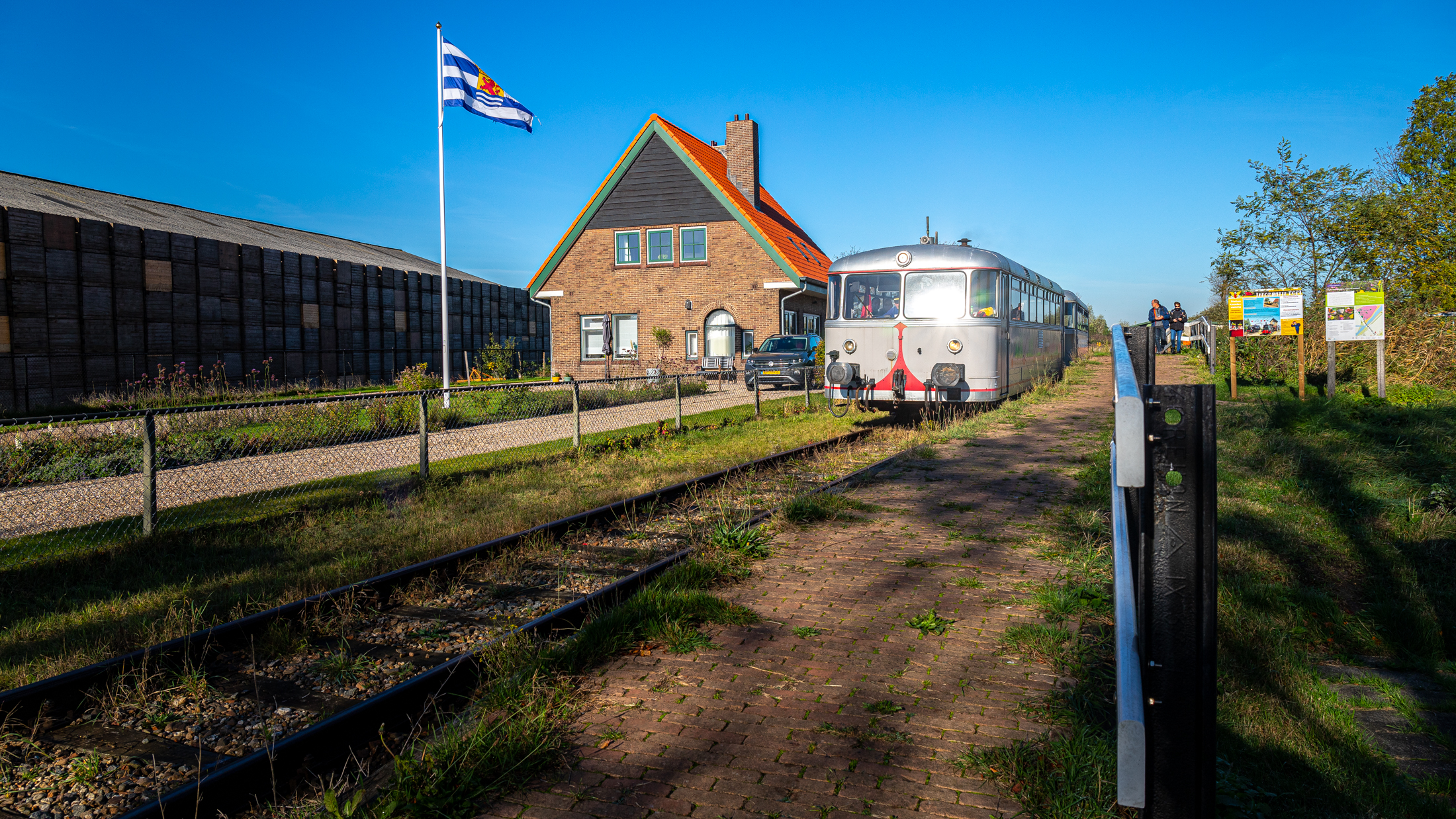
Railway station Kwadendamme
