= COVRA =

Dutch nuclear waste management organisation

- Centrale Organisatie Voor Radioactief Afval
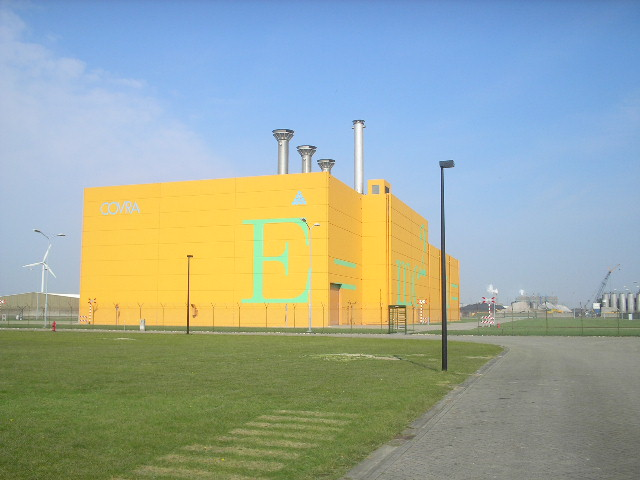
- Formation: 1982
- Location: Nieuwdorp, Netherlands
- Coordinates: 51°26′30″N 3°42′41″E
- Services: Nuclear storage
- Website: covra.nl/en

COVRA (Centrale Organisatie Voor Radioactief Afval) is the only Dutch nuclear waste processing and storage company. Located in Nieuwdorp, it stores waste produced at the Borssele nuclear power plant after it is reprocessed by Areva NC in La Hague, France. The company also stores radioactive waste from hospitals and laboratories. COVRA currently has a license to operate for one hundred years.
