= Dingenis de Wilde =

Dutch sports shooter

Personal information
- Born: 2 January 1885 Heinkenszand, Netherlands
- Died: 17 March 1947 (aged 62) Goes, Netherlands

Sport
- Sport: Sports shooting

Dingenis de Wilde (2 January 1885 – 17 March 1947) was a Dutch sports shooter. He competed in the 25 m rapid fire pistol event at the 1924 Summer Olympics.
