= Heinkenszand =

- Town
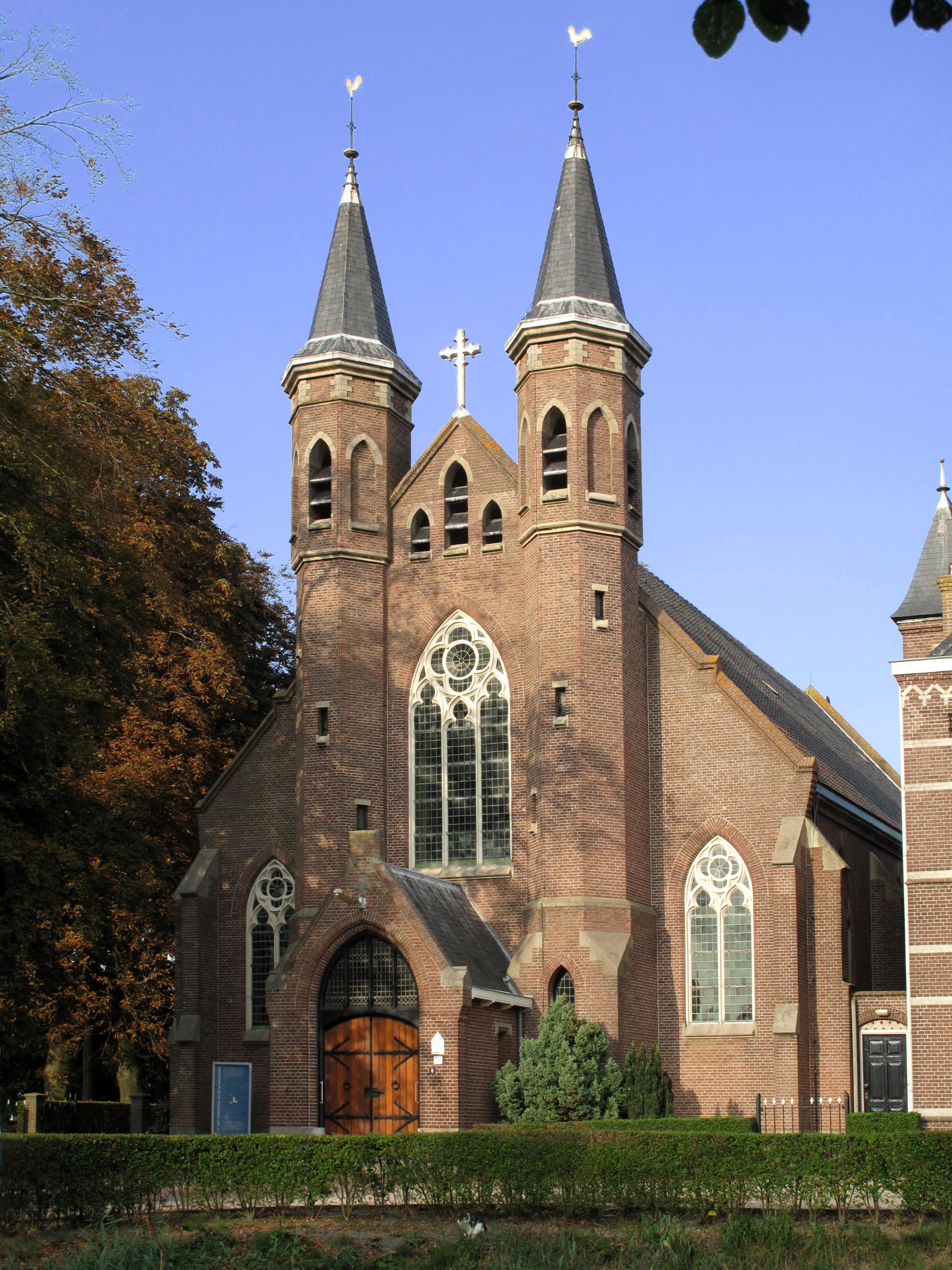
- Heinkenszand, church: Sint Blasiuskerk

- Coat of arms

- Location in the province of Zeeland in the Netherlands Heinkenszand (Netherlands)
- Coordinates: 51°28′23″N 3°48′52″E
- Country: Netherlands
- Province: Zeeland
- Municipality: Borsele

Area
  - Total: 12.19 km^{2} (4.71 sq mi)
- Elevation: 2.2 m (7.2 ft)

Population (2021)
  - Total: 5,510
  - Density: 452/km^{2} (1,170/sq mi)
- Time zone: UTC+1 (CET)
  - Summer (DST): UTC+2 (CEST)
- Postal code: 4451
- Dialing code: 0113

Heinkenszand is a town in the Dutch province of Zeeland. It is the largest settlement in the municipality of Borsele, which has approximately 22,500 inhabitants, and lies about 14 km east of Middelburg.

== History ==
The village was first mentioned in 1351 as Heynekijnssand, and means "sand of Heynekijn (Hendrik)". Heinkenszand is a dike village which is located between the Oosterlandpolder and the Oosterguitepolder.

The Dutch Reformed church is an aisleless church with built-in tower which was built in 1844 to replace its medieval predecessor. The spire dates from 1932. The Catholic St Blasius Church was built between 1864 and 1866 on the location of the former Barbestein castle, and has a twin tower.

The estate Watervliet was built around 1588 on the location of another former castle. It was demolished in 1793 and replaced by estate Bloemenheuvel which in turn was demolished in 1895. The current estate Landlust probably started as a farm in 1793 on the ground. It was extended into a hunting lodge in 1856. The estate and park were donated to Het Zeeuwse Landschap in 1956.

Heinkenszand was home to 1,389 people in 1840. Heinkenszand was a separate municipality until 1970 when it was merged into Borsele.

== Tourism ==
Heinkenszand has steadily been increasing its importance as a tourism destination with holiday park "Stelleplas" and a traditional wooden shoe factory and museum.

== Gallery ==
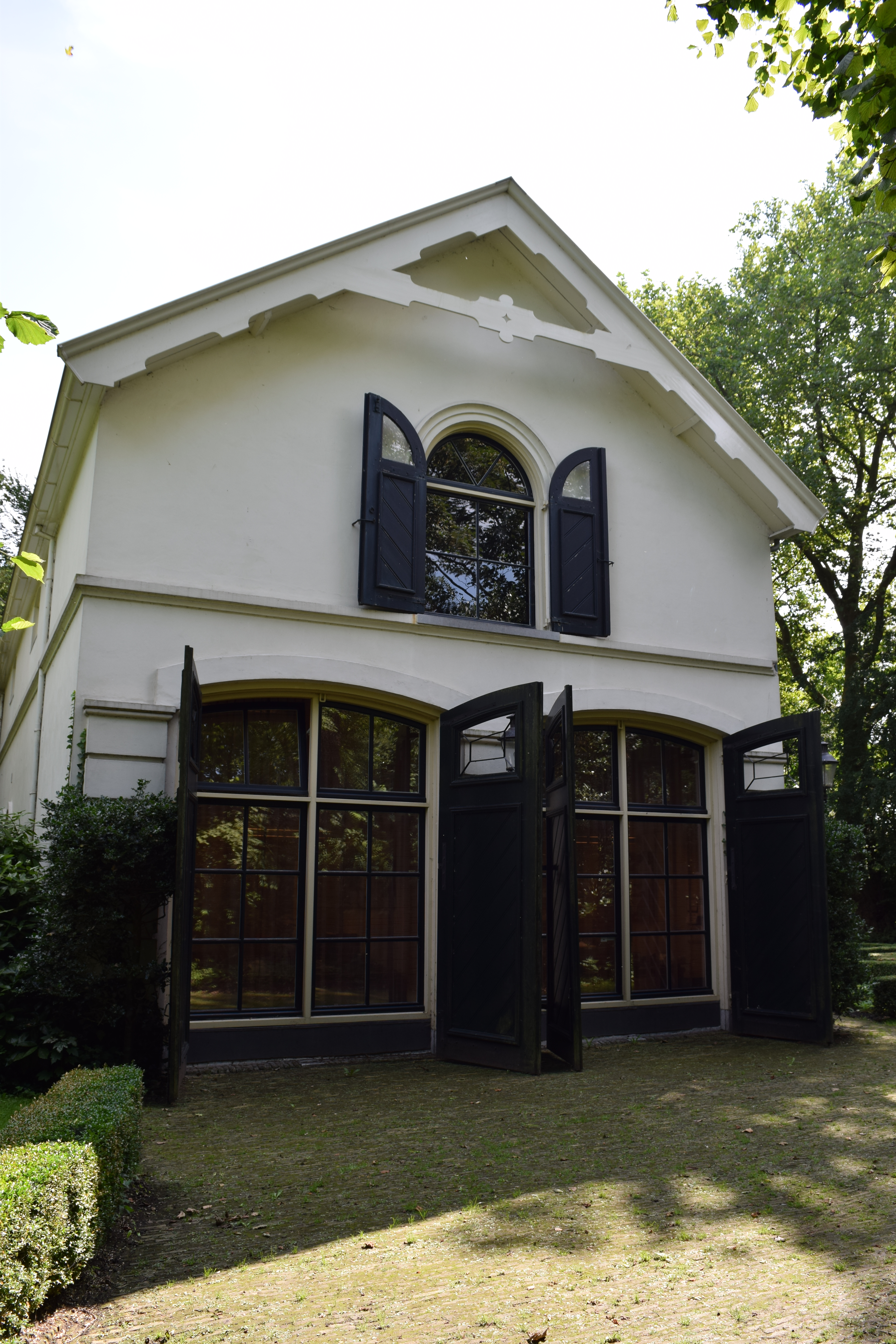
Carriage house of the estate Landlust

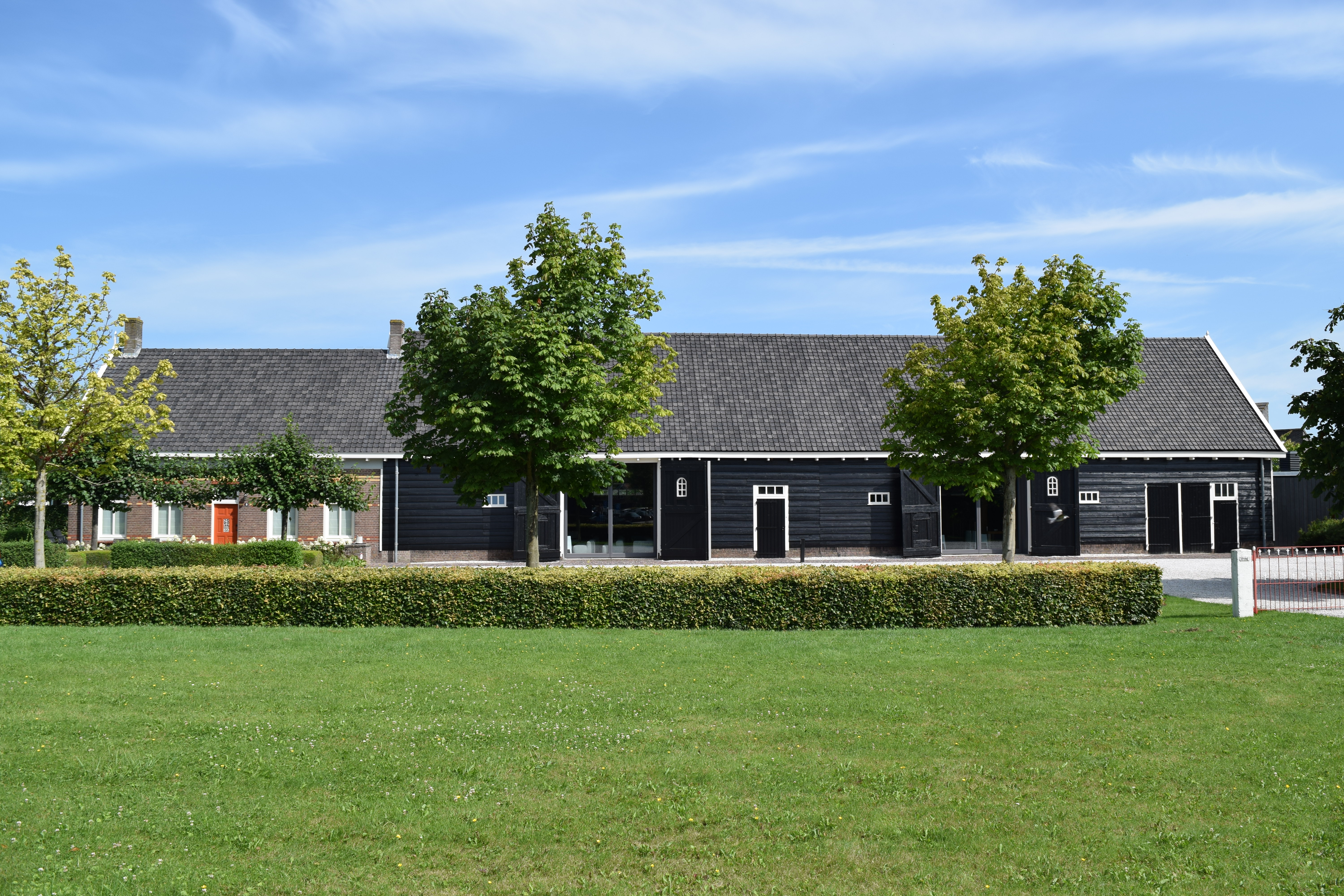
Farm in Heinkenszand

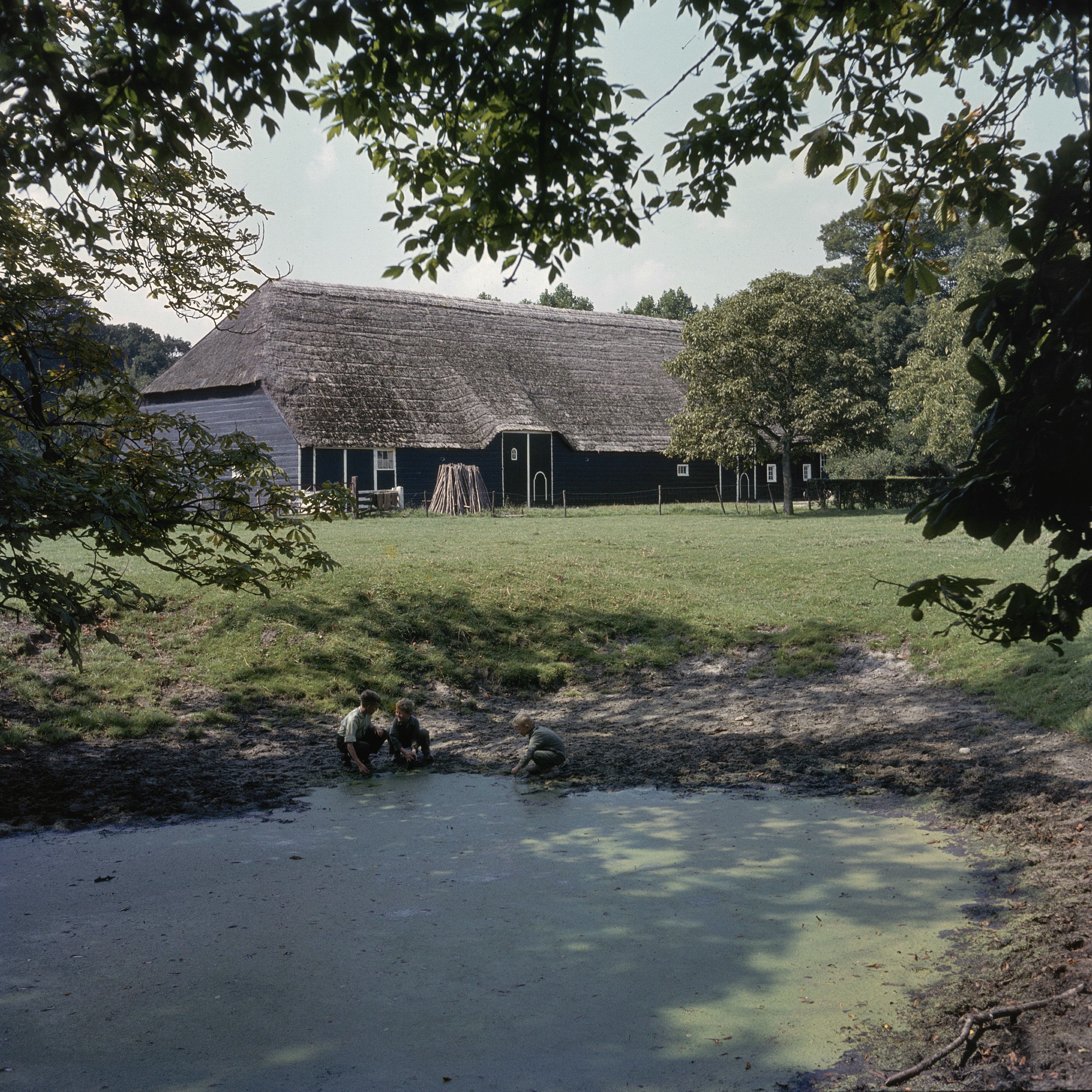
Farm in Heinkenszand

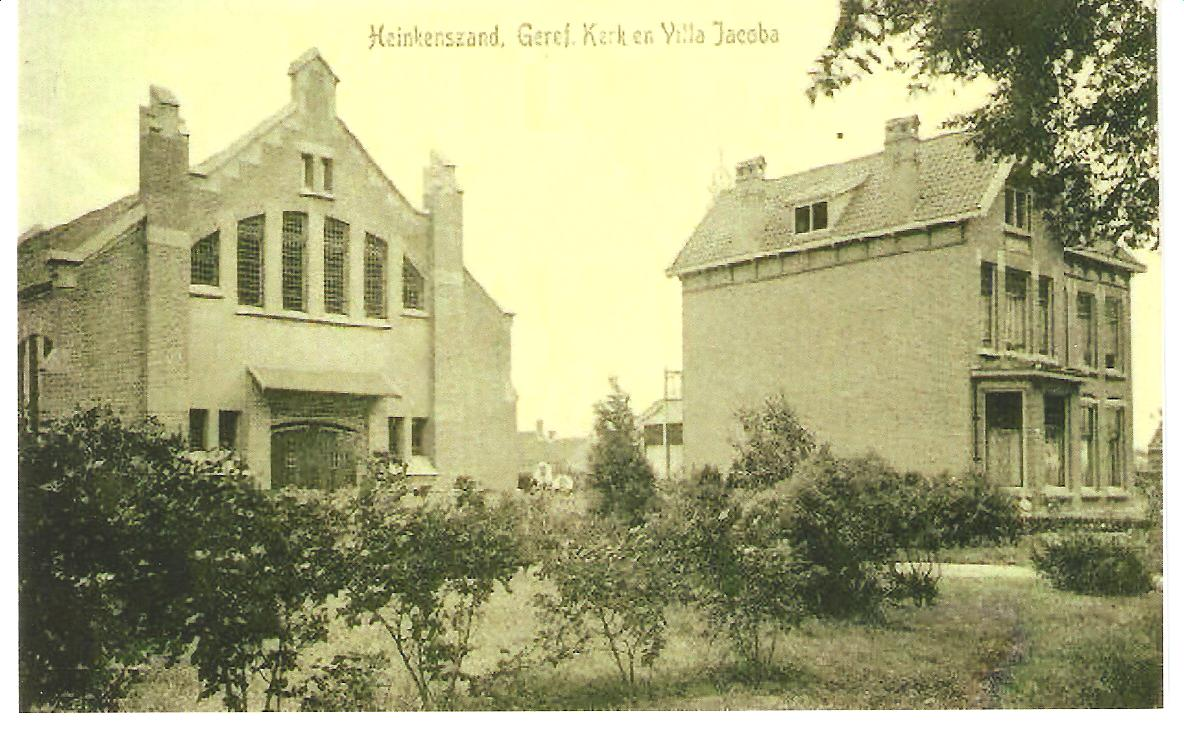
Reformed Church and Villa Jacoba (c. 1910)
