= Nieuwdorp =

Village in Zeeland, Netherlands

- Village
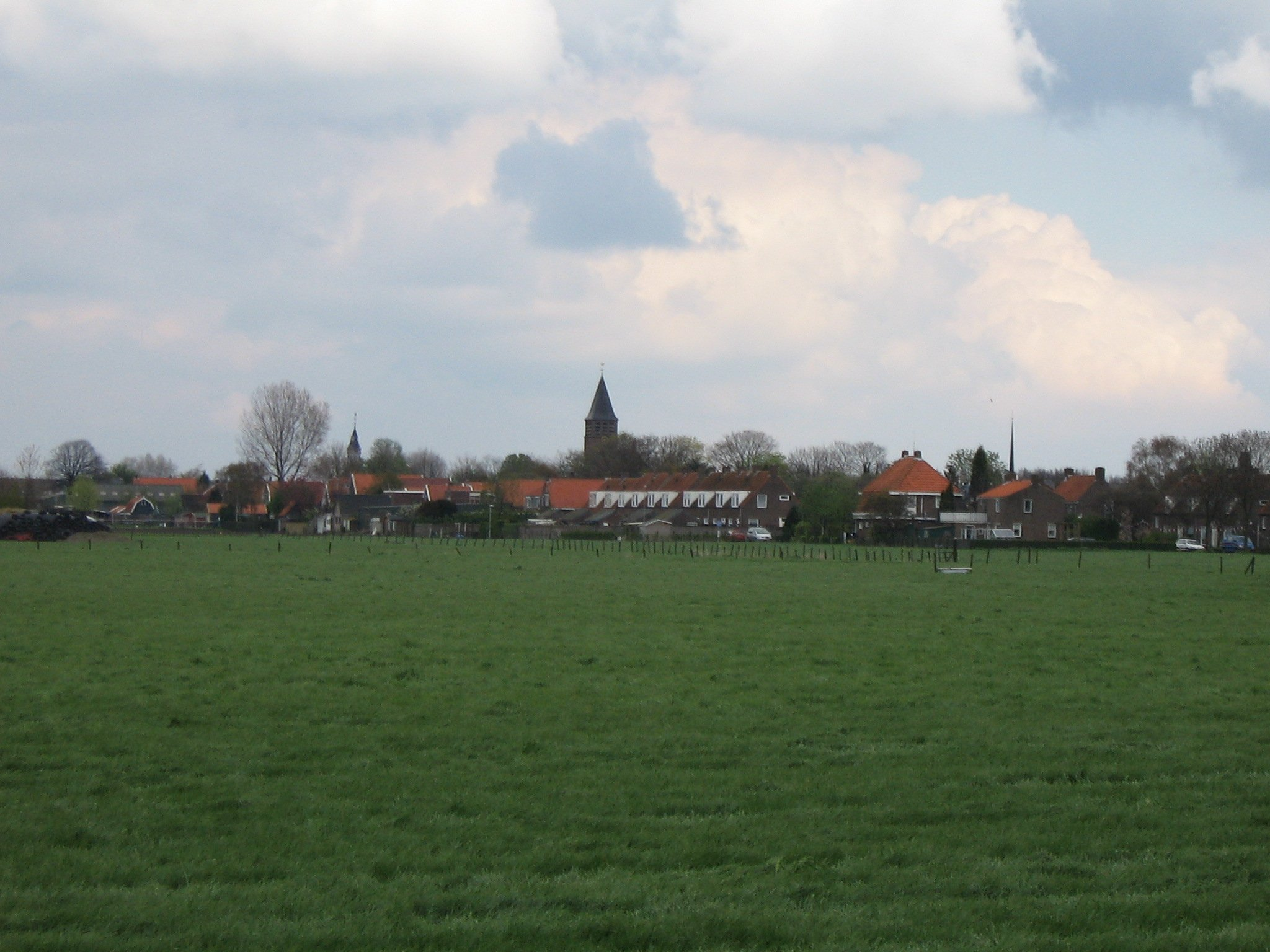

- Location in the province of Zeeland in the Netherlands Nieuwdorp (Netherlands)
- Coordinates: 51°28′11″N 3°44′19″E
- Country: Netherlands
- Province: Zeeland
- Municipality: Borsele

Area
  - Total: 13.82 km^{2} (5.34 sq mi)
- Elevation: 1.6 m (5.2 ft)

Population (2021)
  - Total: 1,235
  - Density: 89.36/km^{2} (231.4/sq mi)
- Time zone: UTC+1 (CET)
  - Summer (DST): UTC+2 (CEST)
- Postal code: 4455
- Dialing code: 0113

Nieuwdorp is a village in the Dutch province of Zeeland. It is a part of the municipality of Borsele, and lies about 9 km east of Middelburg.

== History ==
The village was first mentioned around 1750 as Het Nieuwe Dorp, and means "new village". Nieuw (new) has been added to distinguish from 's-Heer Arendskerke which was colloquially called Oudedorp. Nieuwdorp is a dike village which appeared after the West-Kraayertpolder was poldered in 1642 and Nieuwe Kraayertpolder was added in 1675. The village is centred around a large square.

The Reformed Church was built first in 1841 and is an aisleless church in neoclassic style. It was converted into an apartment building in 2003. The Dutch Reformed church was built between 1917 and 1918 and has expressionist elements. The tower contains a bell from 1710.

Nieuwdorp was home to 388 people in 1840. Nieuwdorp used to be part of the municipality of 's-Heer Arendskerke. In 1970, it became part of the municipality of Borsele. In 2009, the Liberation Museum Zeeland opened and provides an overview of World War II in the province of Zeeland with an emphasis on the Battle of the Scheldt.

== Gallery ==
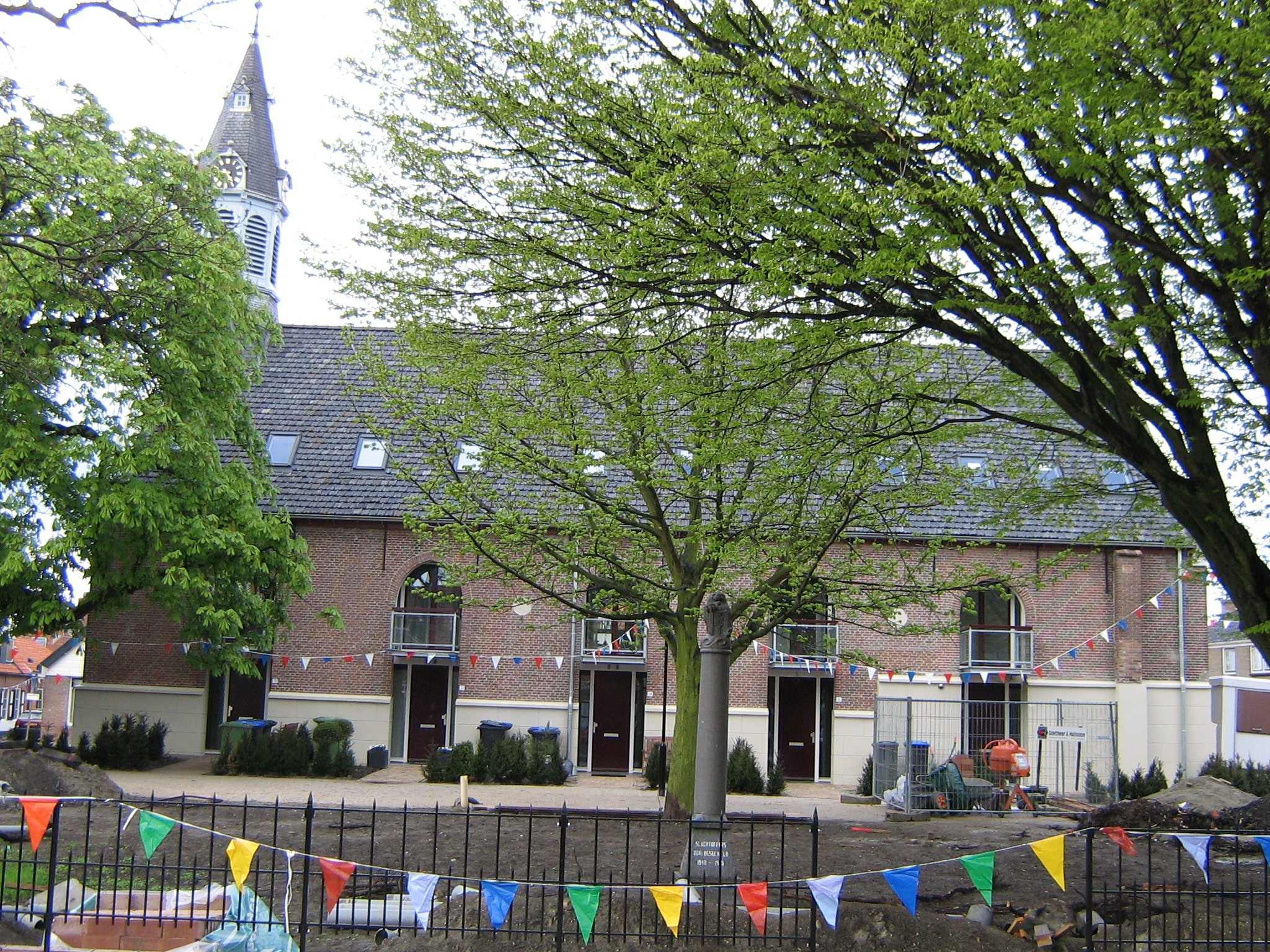
Church of Nieuwdorp

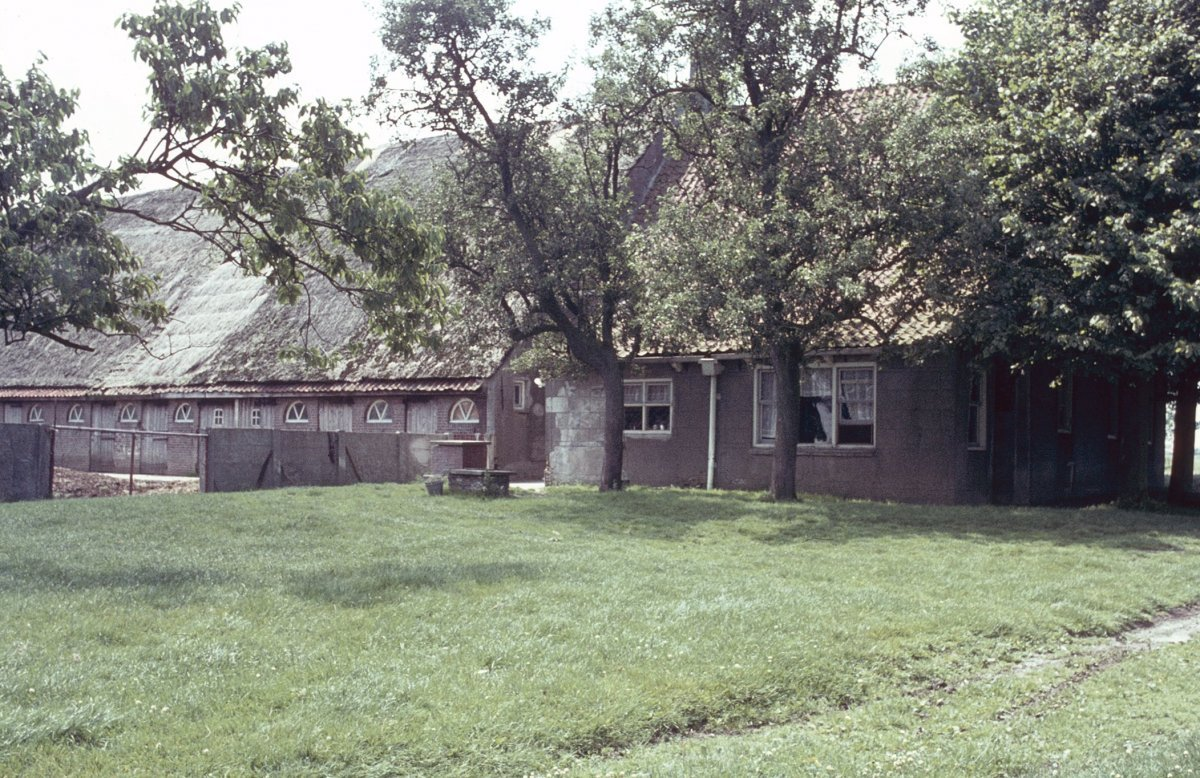
Farm in Nieuwdorp

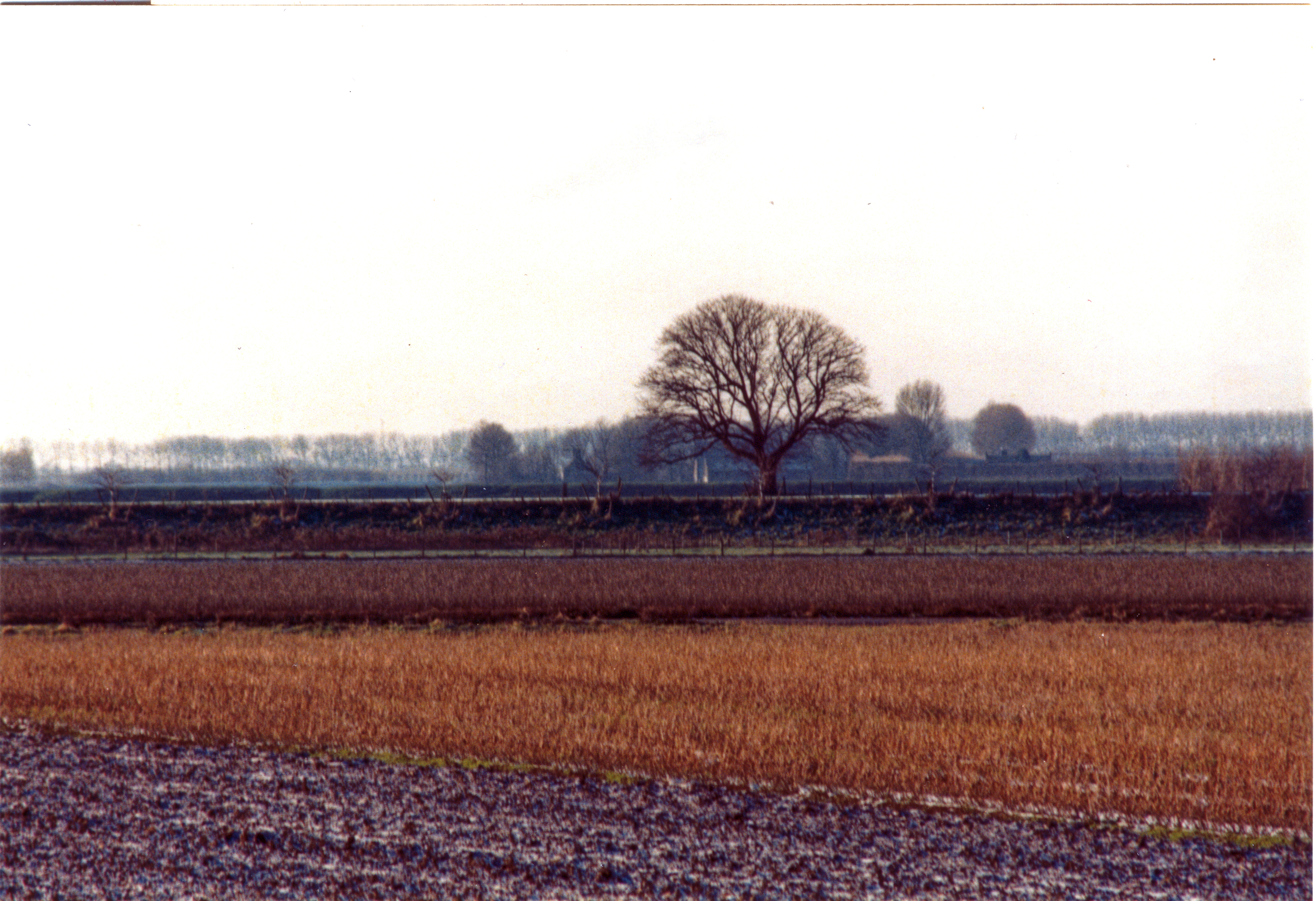
Landscape near Nieuwdorp
