= Ovezande =

- Village
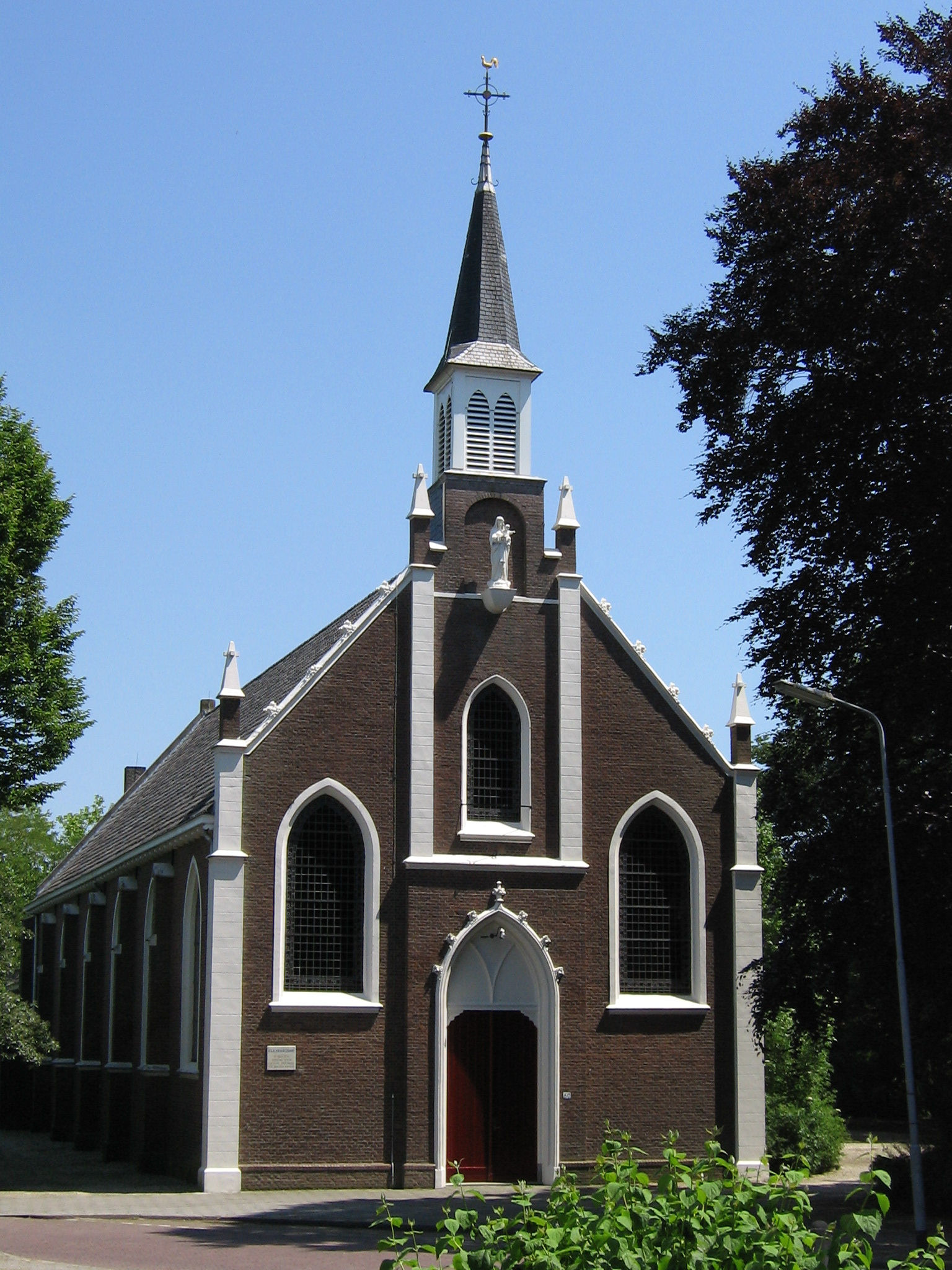
- Assumption of Mary church by Wilhelmus Jacobus van Vogelpoel

- Coat of arms

- Location in the province of Zeeland in the Netherlands Ovezande (Netherlands)
- Coordinates: 51°25′44″N 3°49′19″E
- Country: Netherlands
- Province: Zeeland
- Municipality: Borsele

Area
  - Total: 9.20 km^{2} (3.55 sq mi)
- Elevation: 1.9 m (6.2 ft)

Population (2021)
  - Total: 1,180
  - Density: 128/km^{2} (332/sq mi)
- Time zone: UTC+1 (CET)
  - Summer (DST): UTC+2 (CEST)
- Postal code: 4441
- Dialing code: 0113

Ovezande is a village in the Dutch province of Zeeland. It is a part of the municipality of Borsele, and lies about 16 km east of Middelburg.

== History ==
The village was first mentioned in 1318 or 1319 Avesand, and means "sand (shoal) of Ave (male) or Ava (female)". Ovezande is a dike village which developed on the edge of the Oud- and Nieuw-Ovezandepolder. The village used to be a heerlijkheid.

The Dutch Reformed has a non-articulated tower with a constricted needle spire. from the 14th or early 15th century. It was restored in 1955. It is nowadays used for weddings, concerts and meetings. The Catholic Assumption of Mary church was built between 1858 and 1859 as an aisleless_church with wooden tower. It was enlarged between 1906 and 1907.

Ovezande was home to 807 people in 1840. Ovezande was a separate municipality until 1970, when it was merged with Borsele.

== Gallery ==
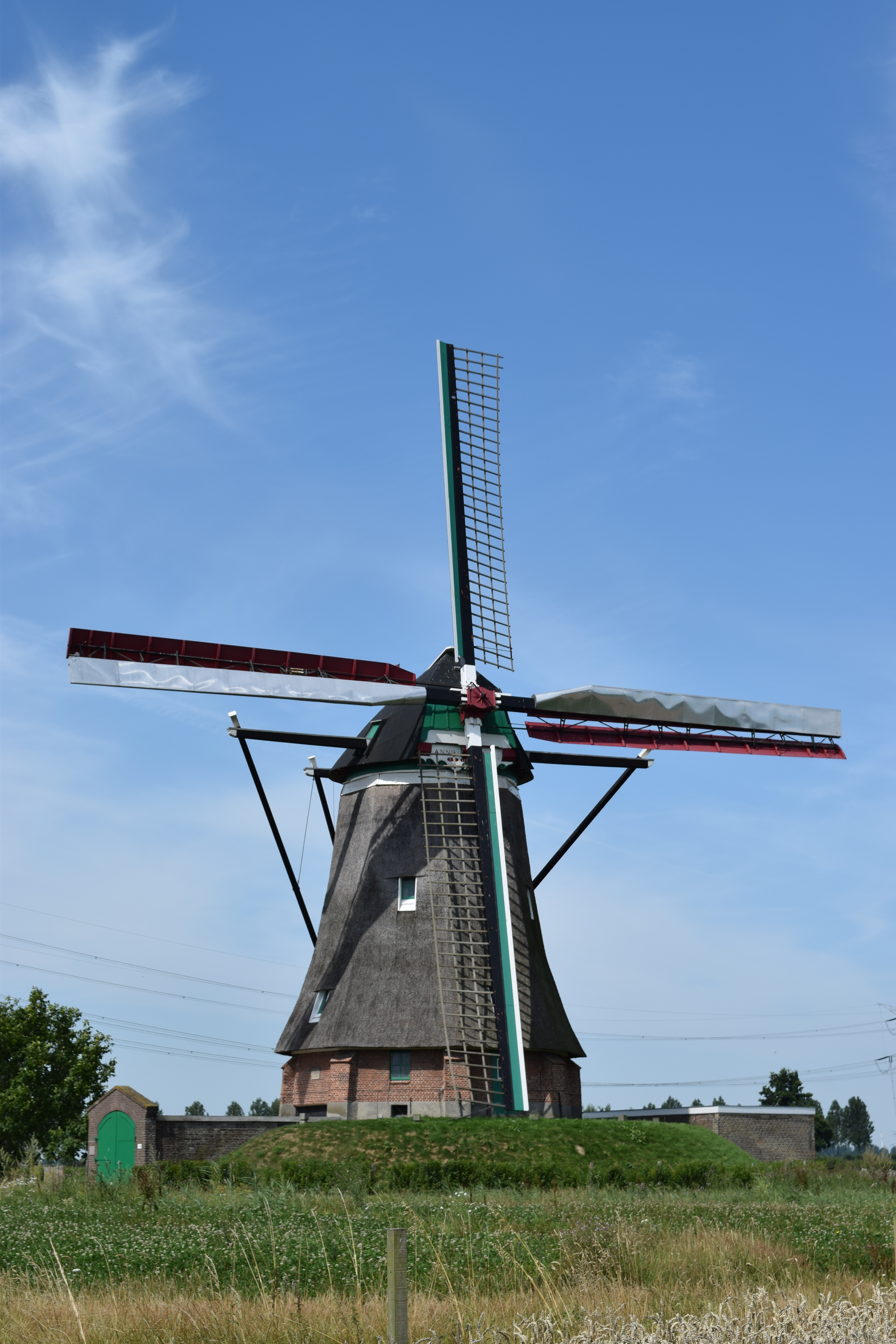
De Blazekop

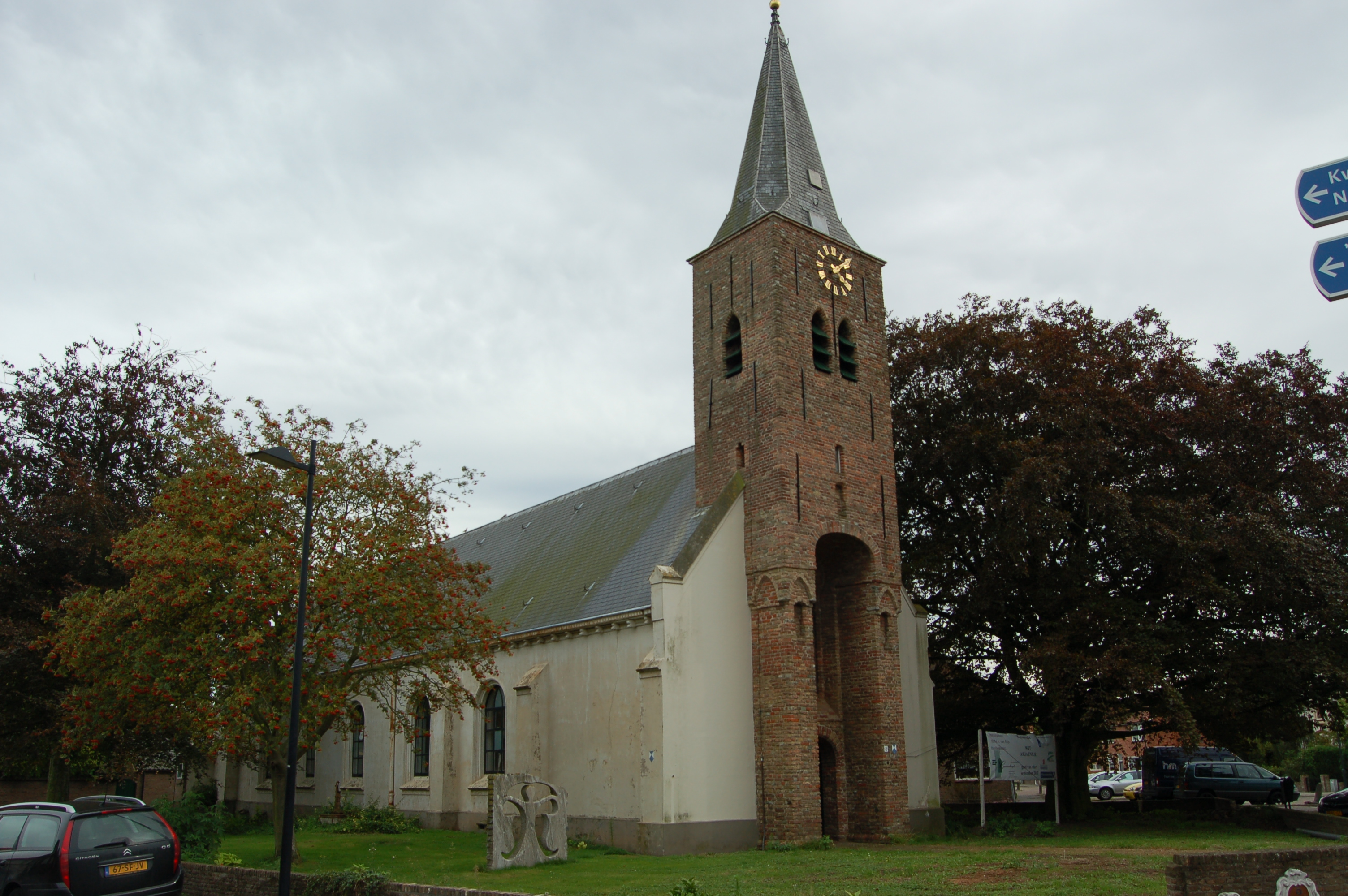
Former Protestant church in Ovezande
