= Dreischor =

- Village
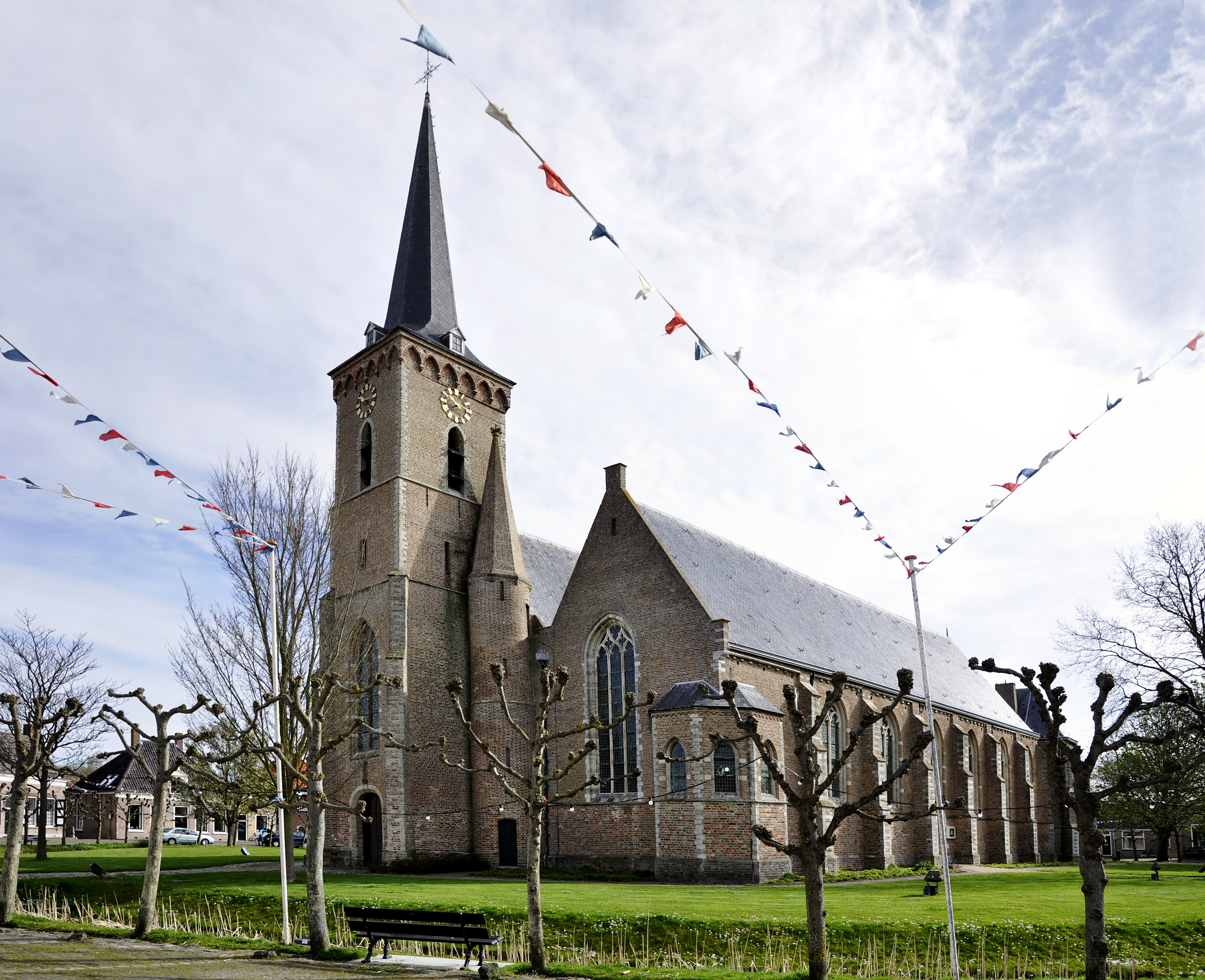
- Church of Dreischor within its moat

- Flag Coat of arms

- Location in the province of Zeeland in the Netherlands Dreischor (Netherlands)
- Coordinates: 51°41′19″N 3°58′57″E
- Country: Netherlands
- Province: Zeeland
- Municipality: Schouwen-Duiveland

Area
  - Total: 15.58 km^{2} (6.02 sq mi)
- Elevation: 0.6 m (2.0 ft)

Population (2021)
  - Total: 975
  - Density: 62.6/km^{2} (162/sq mi)
- Time zone: UTC+1 (CET)
  - Summer (DST): UTC+2 (CEST)
- Postal code: 4315
- Dialing code: 0111

Dreischor is a village in the Dutch province of Zeeland. It is a part of the municipality of Schouwen-Duiveland, and lies about 20 km southwest of Hellevoetsluis.

== Geography ==
=== Population and surface ===
In 2001, the village of Dreischor had 549 inhabitants. The built-up area of the town was 0.18 km², and contained 271 residences. The statistical area "Dreischor", which also can include the surrounding countryside, has a population of around 1020.

=== Dreischor village ===
Dreischor is a typical example of a ringdorp. A ringdorp is a type of village found in Zeeland and the Zuid-Holland islands. It is characterized by a circle with a church and cemetery in the center. This terrain is delimited by a moat. On the other side of the moat are the village houses, which face the church. Dreischor is one of the few villages that still has the moat and a very well preserved set of monumental houses along this moat. The ensemble is therefore protected as a monument.

The church of Dreischor was originally dedicated to Saint Adrian. It is a two-aisled Gothic Hall church, with a fived side choir and a tower. The choir was started in about 1350, the first aisle followed shortly after 1400. The tower dates from the first half of the 15th century. The late Gothic southern aisle was built in the late 15th century. In about 1550 the Sacristy was built perpendicular on the south side of the choir. The interior has some interesting wall paintings and funeral monuments of the lords of Dreischor.

The former town hall has a stepped gable in yellow brick. It was built in 1637. It has arcs in red brick, and gable stones with the coat of arms of Zeeland, the village arms, and a depiction of Lady Justice. To the left is a little gate with a text and two coats of arms: one of the bailiff, and one of the probable builder Jan Stavenisse (died 1645).

The former mayor's residence just south of the center, is a good example of post-war (here: post-flood) architecture. It resembles Hofwijck near The Hague, but with a concrete Baluster on top of the façade. The house was built on top of the foundations of the Windenburg, which' moat was filled at the time.

== History ==
Dreischor used to be an island until 1374, when it was attached to the island of Schouwen.

In the 19th century, Dreischor became the center of the Flax industry of the island.

Dreischor was a separate municipality until 1961, when it was merged into Brouwershaven.

== Gallery ==
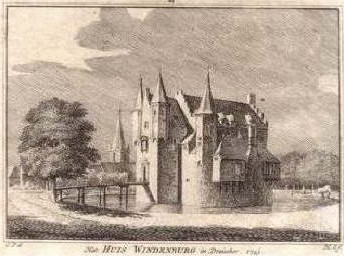
Copperplate engraving of Windenburg

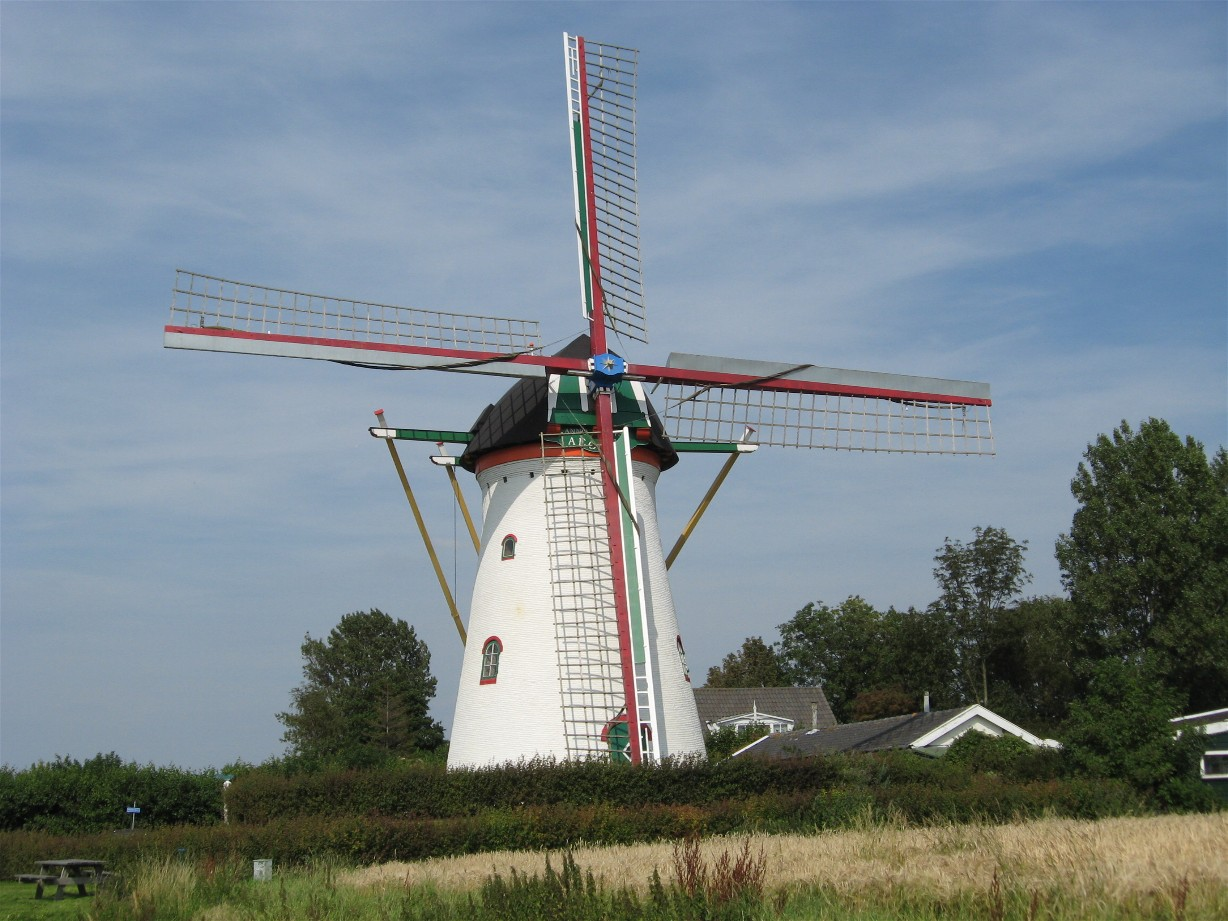
Windmill in Dreischor

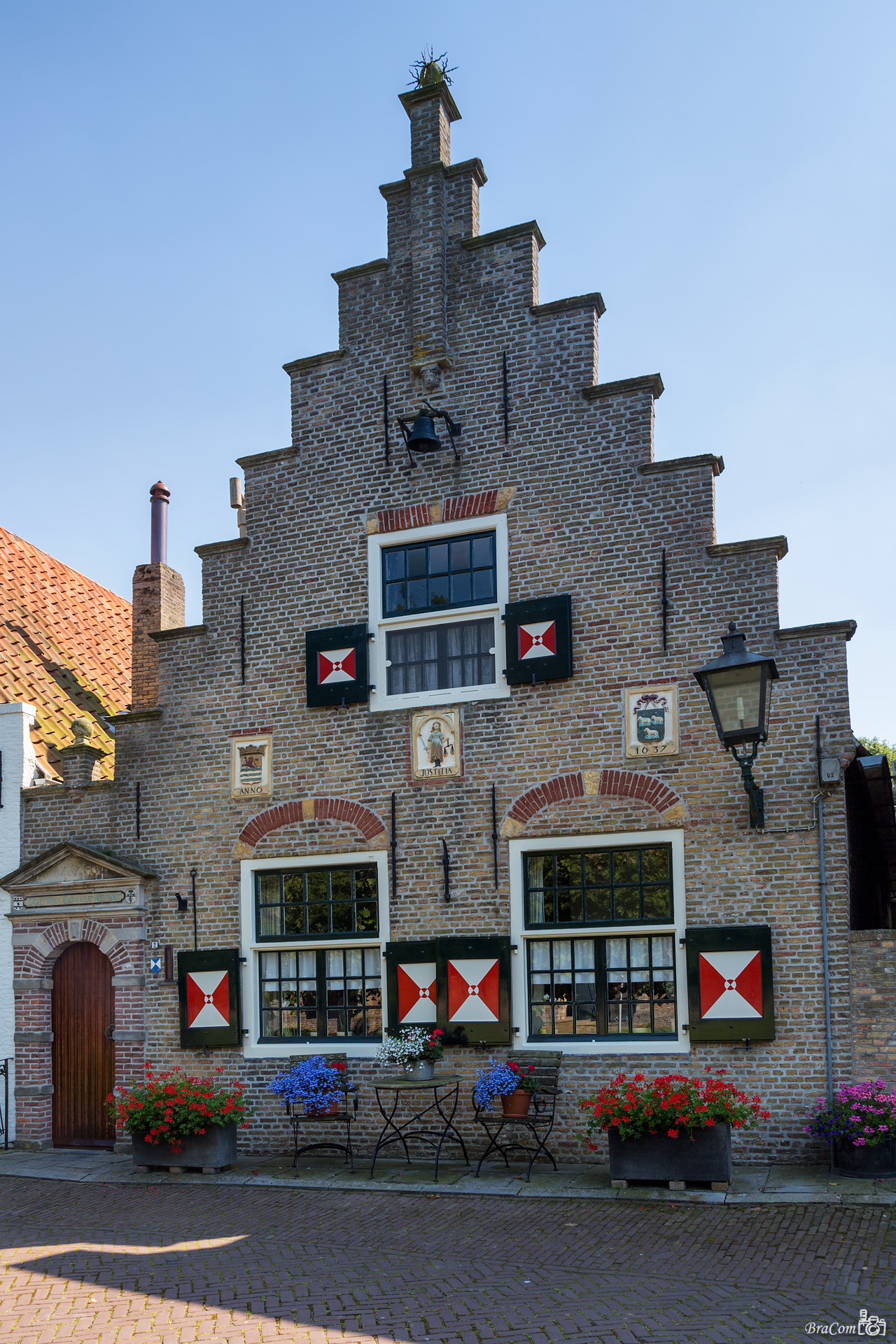
Former town hall

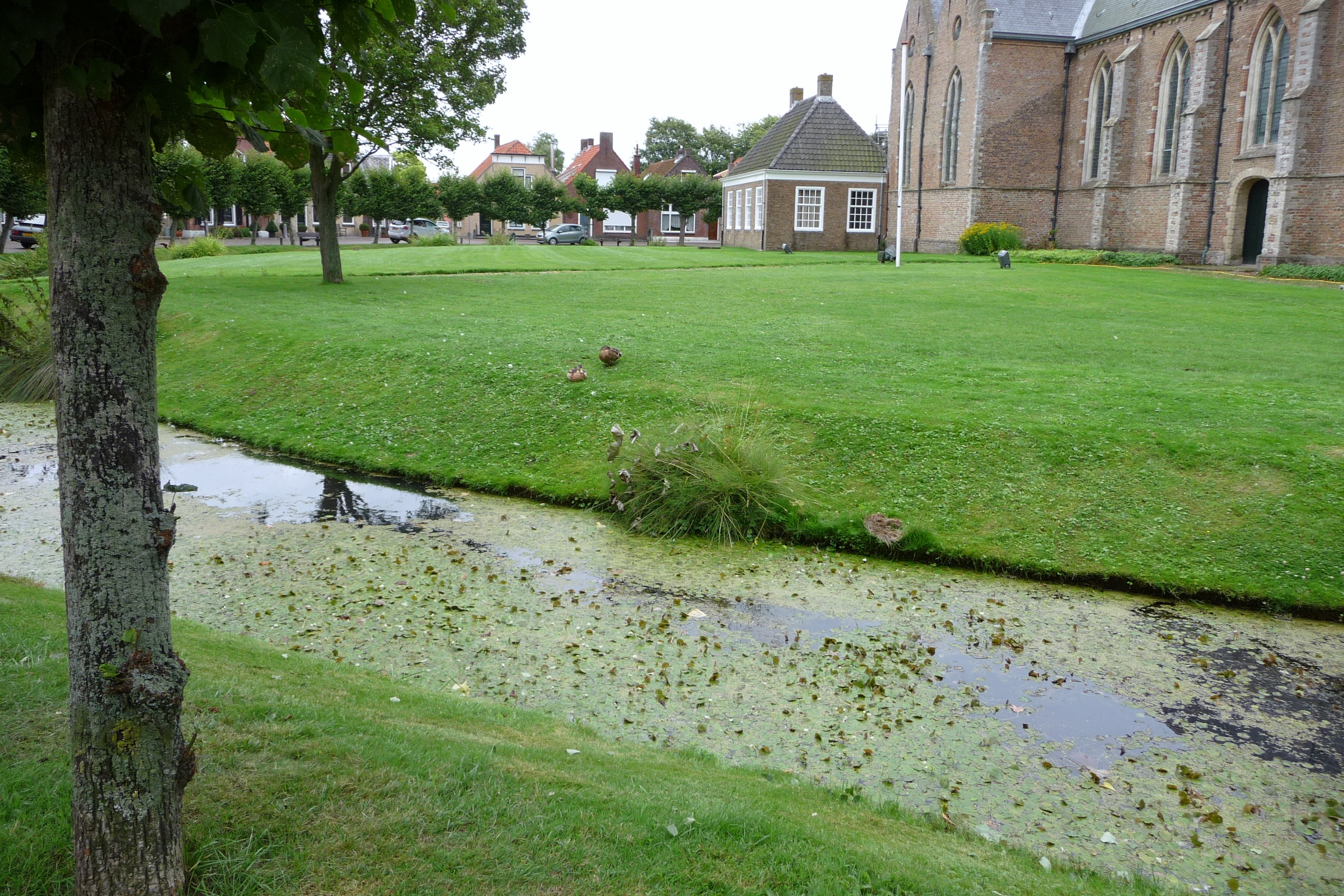
The church within the moat

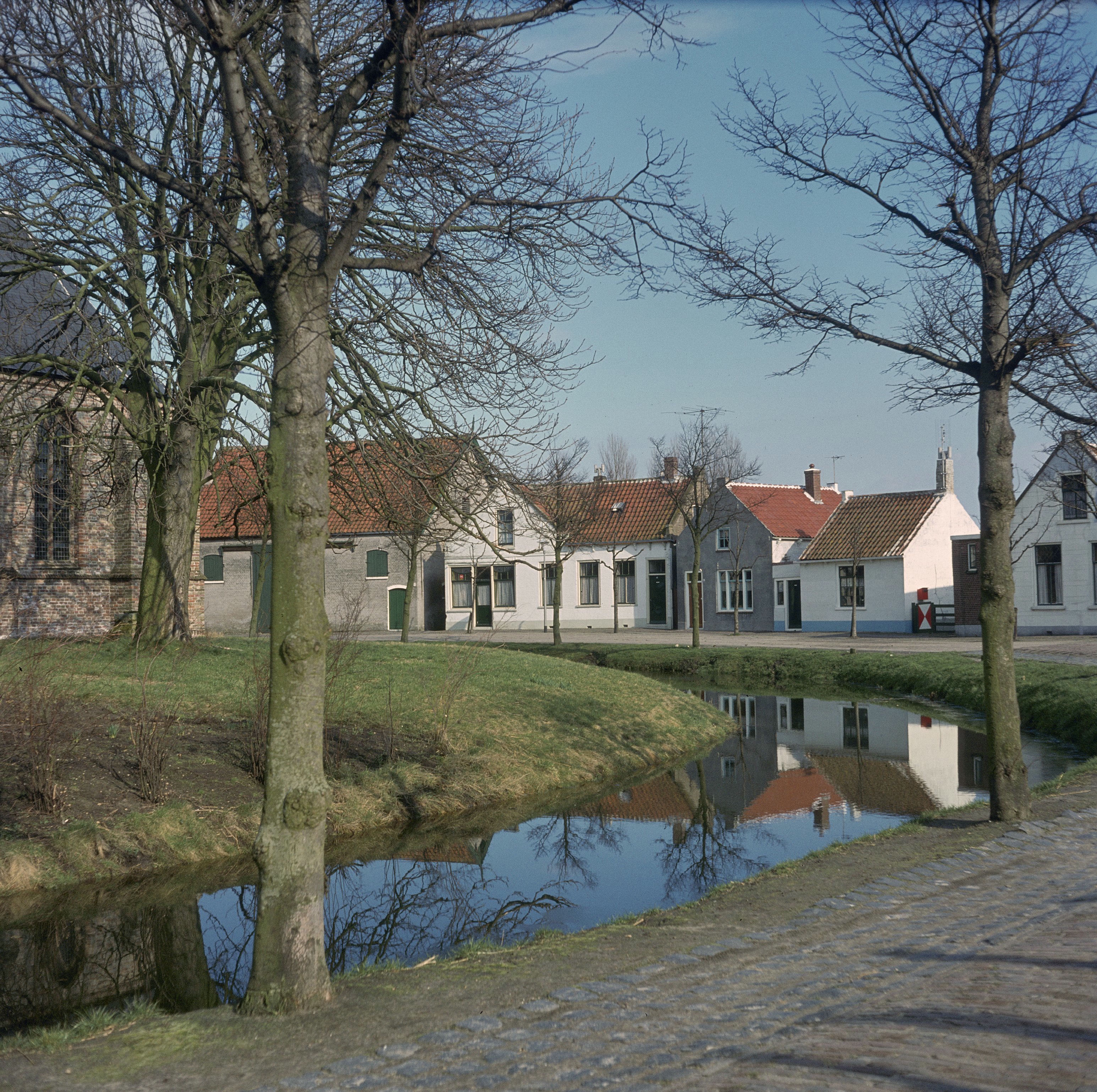
View of the ring

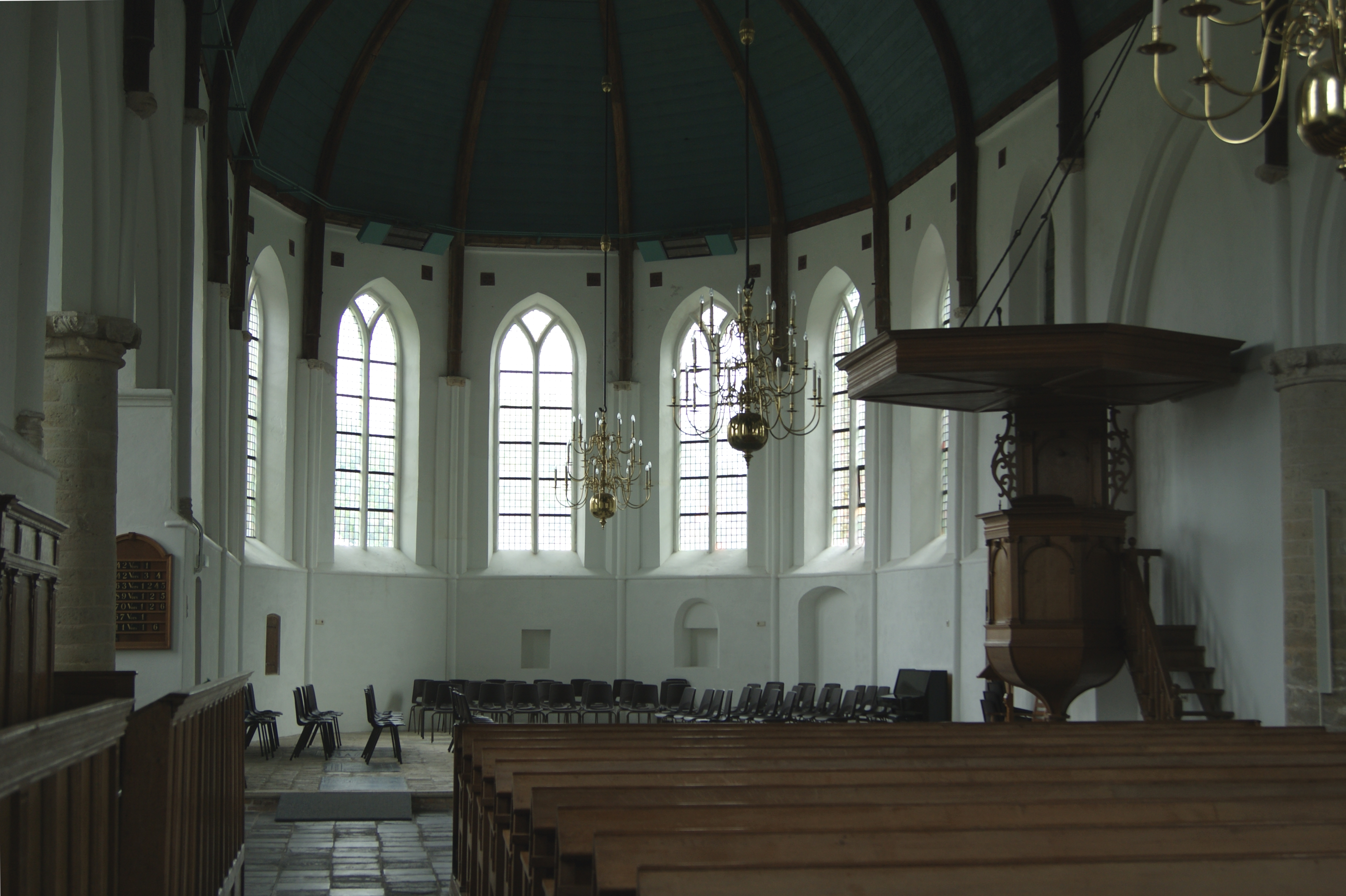
Interior of the church in Dreischor
