= Jaap Renaud =

Dutch university teacher

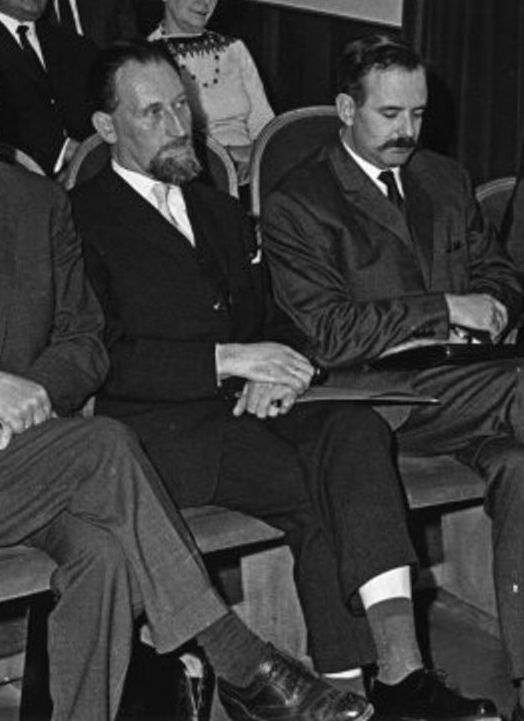
- Jaap Renaud at symposium in 1966
- Born: 20 February 1911; Voorburg, Netherlands
- Died: 25 April 2007 (aged 96)
- Education: University of Amsterdam
- Scientific career
- Fields: Archaeology

Jacob Gerard Nicolaas (Jaap) Renaud (Voorburg, 20 February 1911 - 25 April 2007) was a Dutch archaeologist and adjunct professor at Utrecht University.

== Life ==
=== Family ===
Renaud's father was a house painter supervisor. His grandfather was a school teacher, whom the young Renaud often visited. Together they would visit many castles near The Hague. Renaud would recreate these in his attic from the wood of cigar boxes, including the siege equipment. At the young age of 14 he already visited The Hague municipality archives to study the history of Binckhorst Castle and its inhabitants.

In the tradition of his family Renaud also became a school teacher, but during the Great Depression he could not acquire a fixed position. He married Hanna Maartense whom he had met at the Nederlandse Bond van Abstinent Studerenden (NBAS), a student movement for alcohol abstinence. Together they visited European castles by bicycle and tent.

=== Early career ===
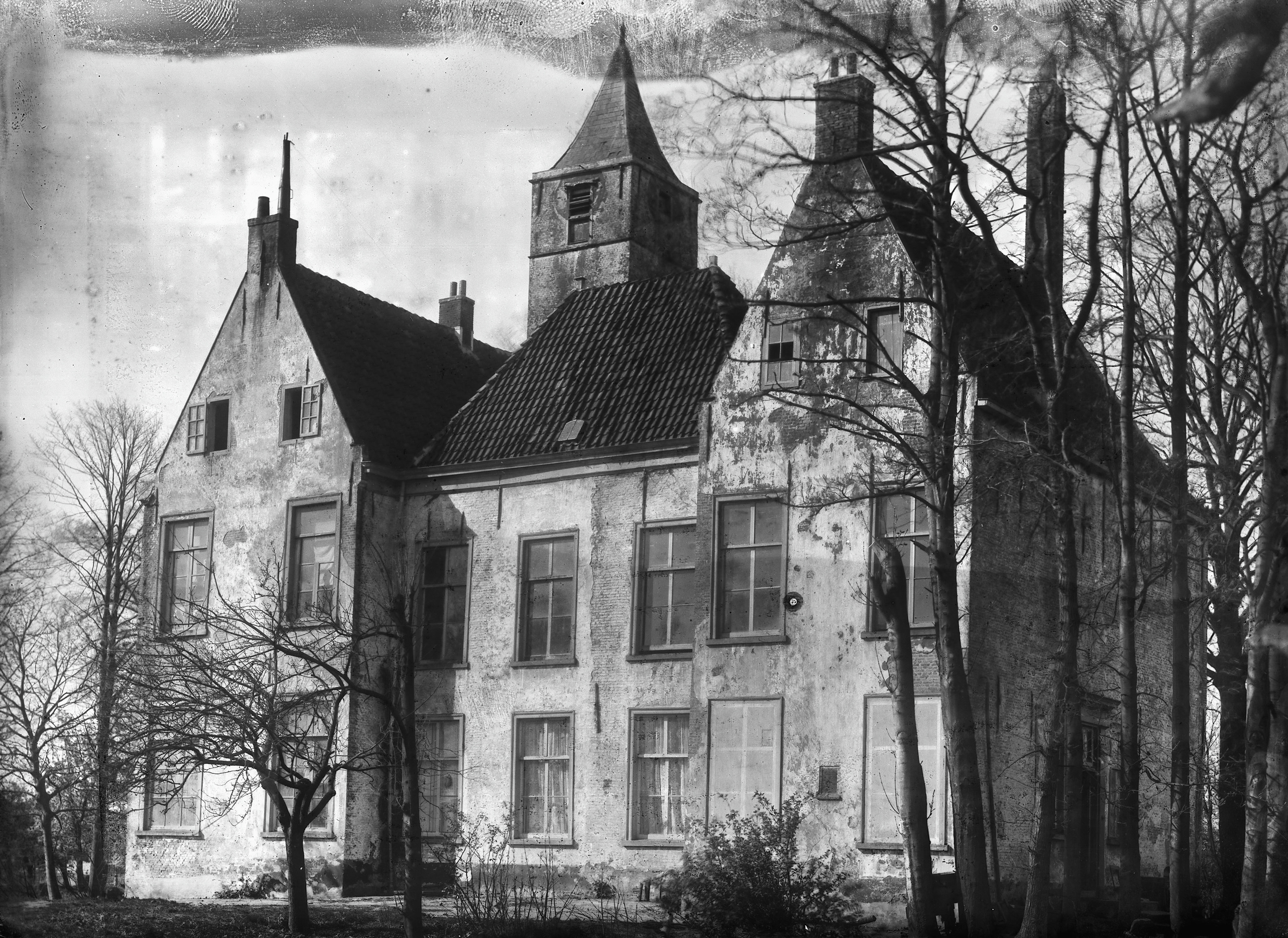
Binckhorst Castle in Renaud's youth

Due to cost constraints academic studies were not possible for Renaud. However, his brother in law W.F. Maartense was a Geography teacher. He brought him into contact with professor Nicolaas Bernardus Tenhaeff (1885-1943) from Amsterdam University taught him in private. In 1938 Renaud gave his first lecture, treating medieval pottery.

Two publications were important for Renaud's early career. The first was about Binckhorst Castle, published in 1936. The other was about the construction history of Egmond Castle. These brought him into contact with the famous archaeologist A.E. van Giffen (1884-1973) from the University of Groningen, and Professor Engelbert Hendrik ter Kuile (1900-1988) from the Rijksdienst voor de Monumentenzorg (the national organization for the preservation of monumental buildings).

=== World War II ===
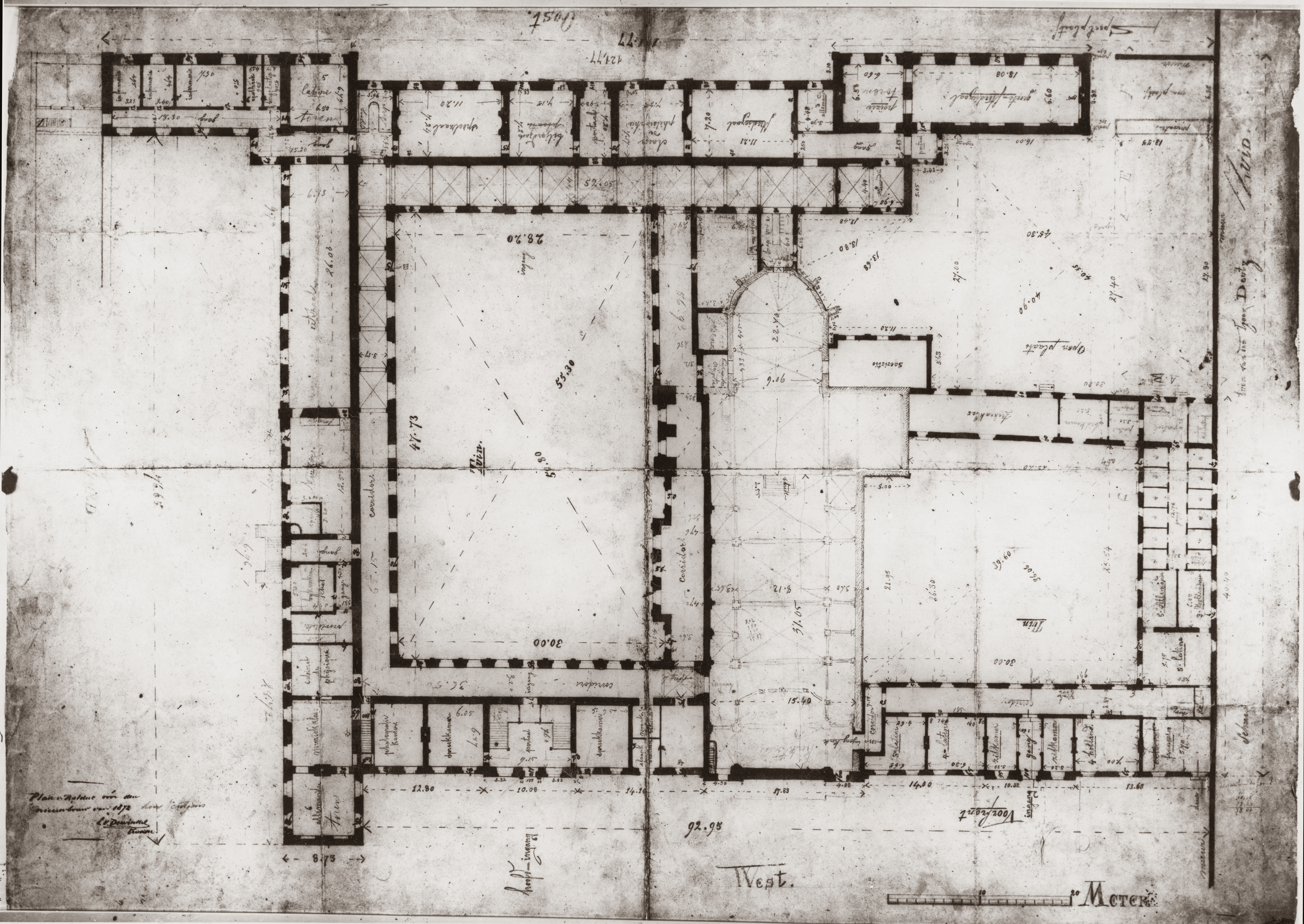
Groundplan of Abbey of Rolduc in 1872 according to Renaud, 1946

After the Dutch defeat in May 1940 Renaud was demobilized. He then got a job as a contractor at the Rijksbureau voor de Monumentenzorg. His first assignment was to describe medieval houses in Maastricht. The next assignments were connected to the German bombing of Rotterdam. In its wake he led archaeological excavations at Spangen Castle and Bulgersteyn Castle and had the daily supervision of the excavations at Starrenburg and Weena.

During the war period Renaud learned a lot from the advice of architectural history Professors E. ter Kuile from Delft University and M.D. Ozinga from Utrecht University. He also learned a lot about masonry and other crafts from the overseers of the works in Rotterdam.

=== Later career ===
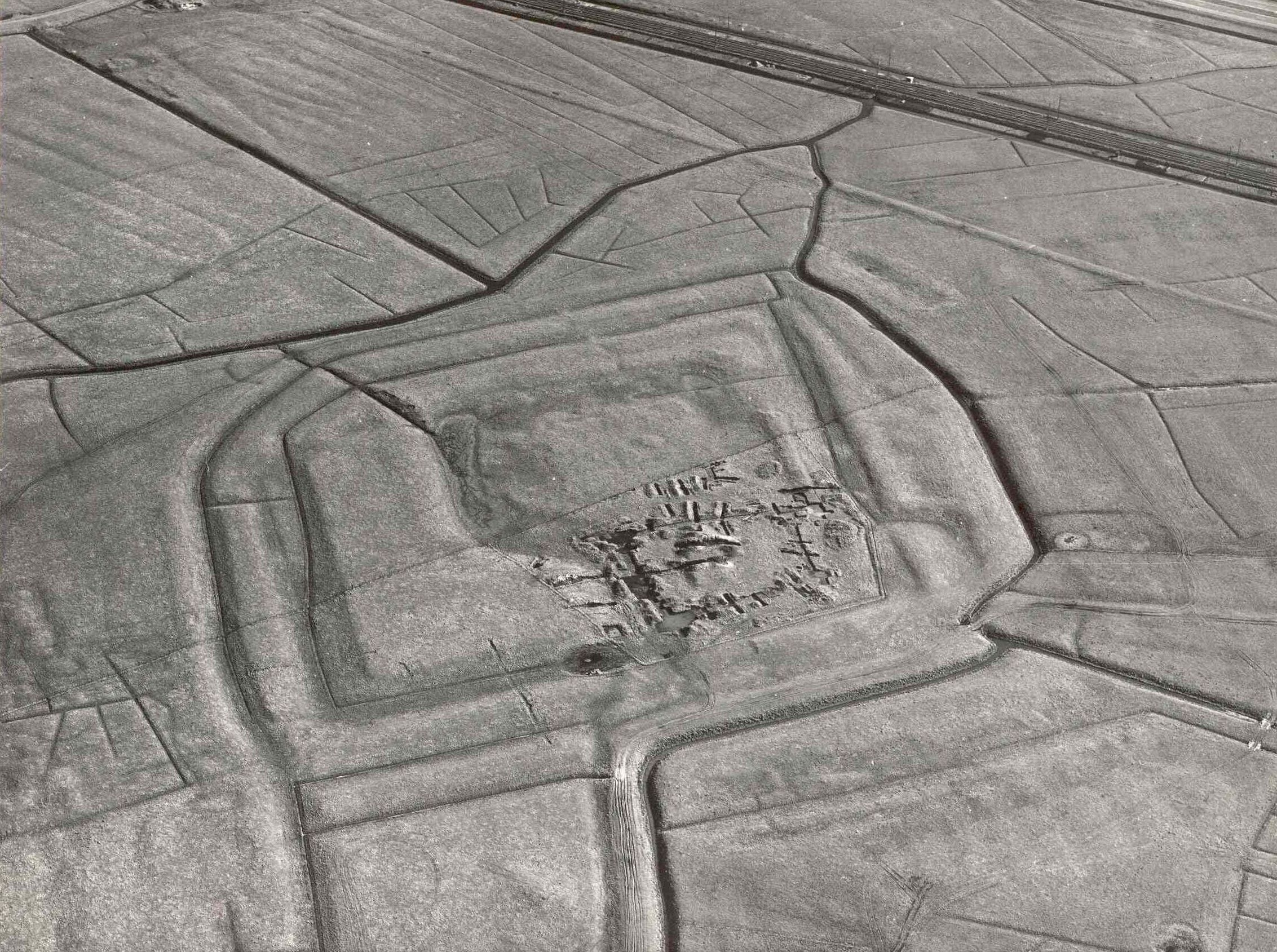
Excavation of outer bailey of the castle by Jaap Renaud in 1960

In 1950 Renaud got an appointment at the Rijksdienst voor Oudheidkundig Bodemonderzoek (ROB), a national government organization for archaeology. This would remain his full time job till his retirement in 1976. In the 1950s he also became involved with the Nederlandse Kastelen Stichting (NKS) (Dutch Castle Foundation) an organization that aimed to preserve the remaining Dutch castles. He would become a member of the board of this foundation, and would lead some of its important publications / journals.

=== Caen ===
Later in the 1950s the Dutch Research Council (NWO) provided funding for Renaud to work in Caen, Normandy, France. Professor of Norman and medieval history Michel de Boüard (1909-1989) of Caen University had asked him to assist in the excavation and restoration of the Château de Caen. Renaud led part of these from 1958 to 1962. Afterwards, De Boüard became his doctoral advisor. In August 1963 Renaud was made a Doctor Honoris Causa of Caen University.

In 1965 Renaud was appointed as lecturer in the science of castles (castellogy) at Utrecht University. It was an appointment for one hour a week, made on the insistence of the NKS. Meanwhile, Reanud continued to work at the ROB. Therefore, the appointment generated more prestige than income, but prestige of course came in handy, when the NKS wanted to discuss preservation. In 1980 Renaud's position at Utrecht was upgraded to that of a professor. From 1971 to 1981 he was also connected to Delft University of Technology.

=== Active in retirement ===
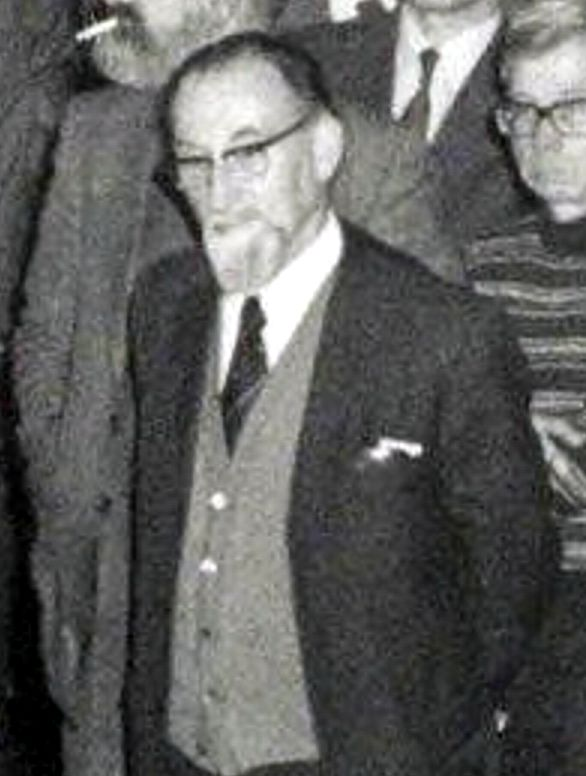
Jaap Renaud in 1976

In March 1976 Renaud retired as scientific employee of the ROB. He nevertheless continued to work on publications. First amongst these was Castellogica, a journal about castles that appeared from 1983 to 2000. He also stayed on for some years as professor in Delft and Utrecht.

== Legacy ==
In 2019 Renaud's student Jean Roefstra summarized Renaud's work as follows: 'Renaud was one of the first Dutch archeologists who was convinced that investigation into the phenomenon castle castle required a broad approach. He thought that the castle had to be considered from a historic, archaeologic, typologic and literary perspective in order to understand the object in its entirety. This line of thought was the basis for the current integral and multidisciplinary approach of castle investigations.

In 2016 De Gast had concluded that Renaud had indeed been a savior for many castles. His work had also saved a lot of information that would otherwise have been lost, and he had been crucial for getting public support for conservation and science. On the other hand, from the 1960s onwards, his focus on construction history, and his failure to pick up on new scientific methods of archaeology led to suboptimal results. The possible explanation is that Renaud had been trained as a historian, not as an archaeologist.

== Selected works ==
- Uit de bouwgeschiedenis van den Binckhorst (1936)
- Uit de bouwgeschiedenis van het slot op den hoef (1938)
