= Nieuwerkerk Windmill =

Windmill in Nieuwerkerk, Netherlands

Coordinates: 51°39′05″N 4°00′16″E

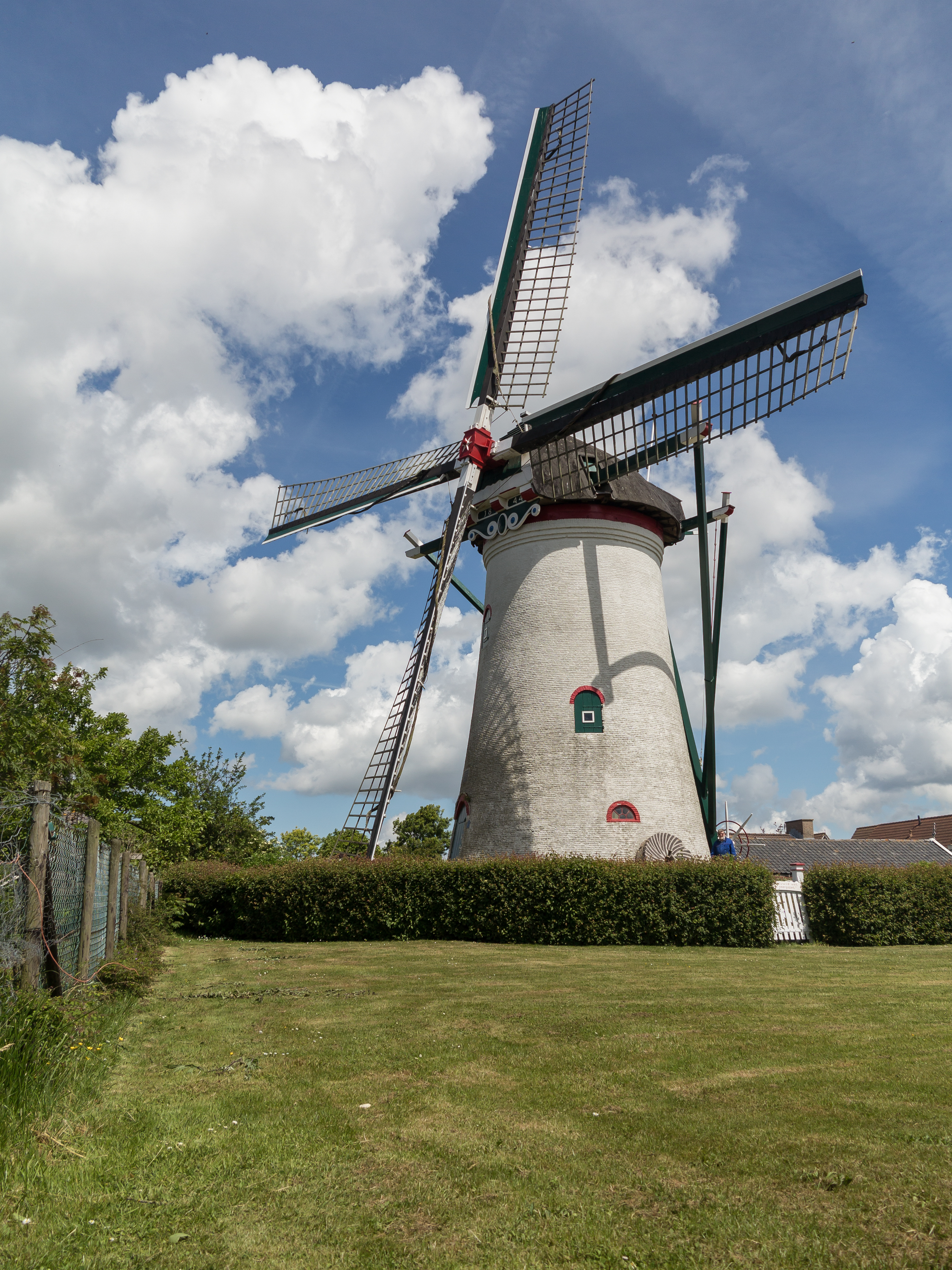
The Nieuwerkerk Windmill in 2015

The Nieuwerkerk Windmill is a grain mill in Nieuwerkerk, Netherlands.

== History ==
The tower mill was built in 1844 to replace a wooden octagonal mill that had burned down, probably after lightning. In 1970 the mill was sold to the municipality of Duiveland that has since been merged with other municipalities into Schouwen-Duiveland.

The mill was preserved after the North Sea flood of 1953 but has had problems for a long time due to the saltwater that has been in and around the mill. In September 2004, the lower meters of the hull were restored. The sails were restored in early 2008.
