= Phoenix breakwaters =

Caissons built during World War II

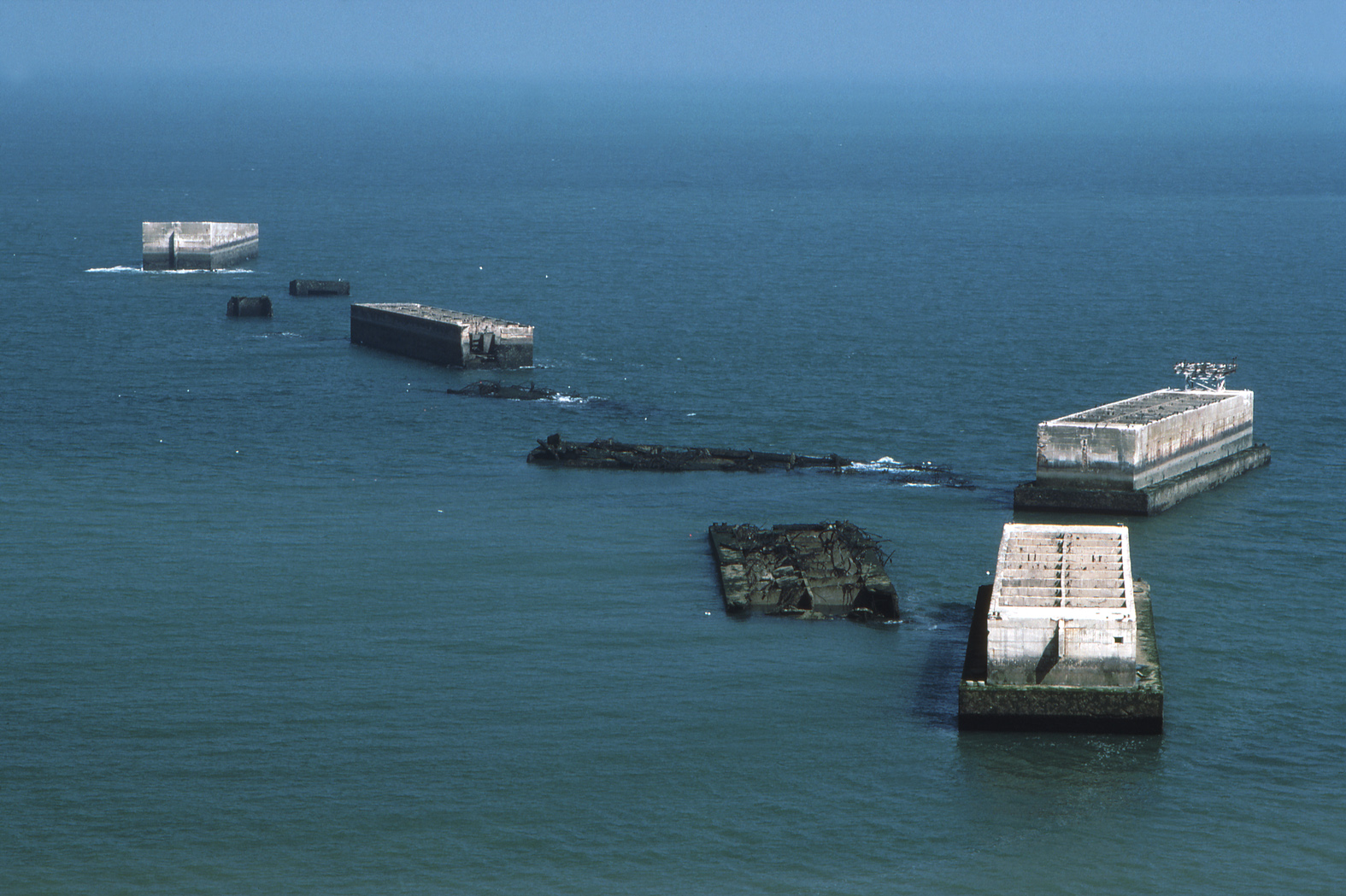
- A line of Phoenix caissons forming a breakwater at Arromanches in Normandy

General information
- Location: English Channel
- Coordinates: 50°34′16″N 2°26′34″W

Technical details
- Material: Reinforced concrete

The Phoenix breakwaters were a set of reinforced concrete caissons built as part of the artificial Mulberry harbours that were assembled as part of the preparations for the Normandy landings during World War II. A total of 213 were built, with 212 floated or side-launched. They were constructed by civil engineering contractors around the coast of Britain. They were collected at Dungeness and Selsey, and then towed by tugboats across the English Channel and sunk to form the Mulberry harbour breakwaters replacing the initial "Gooseberry" block ships. Caissons were added in the autumn of 1944 to reinforce the existing structure to cope with the harbour continuing in use longer than planned.

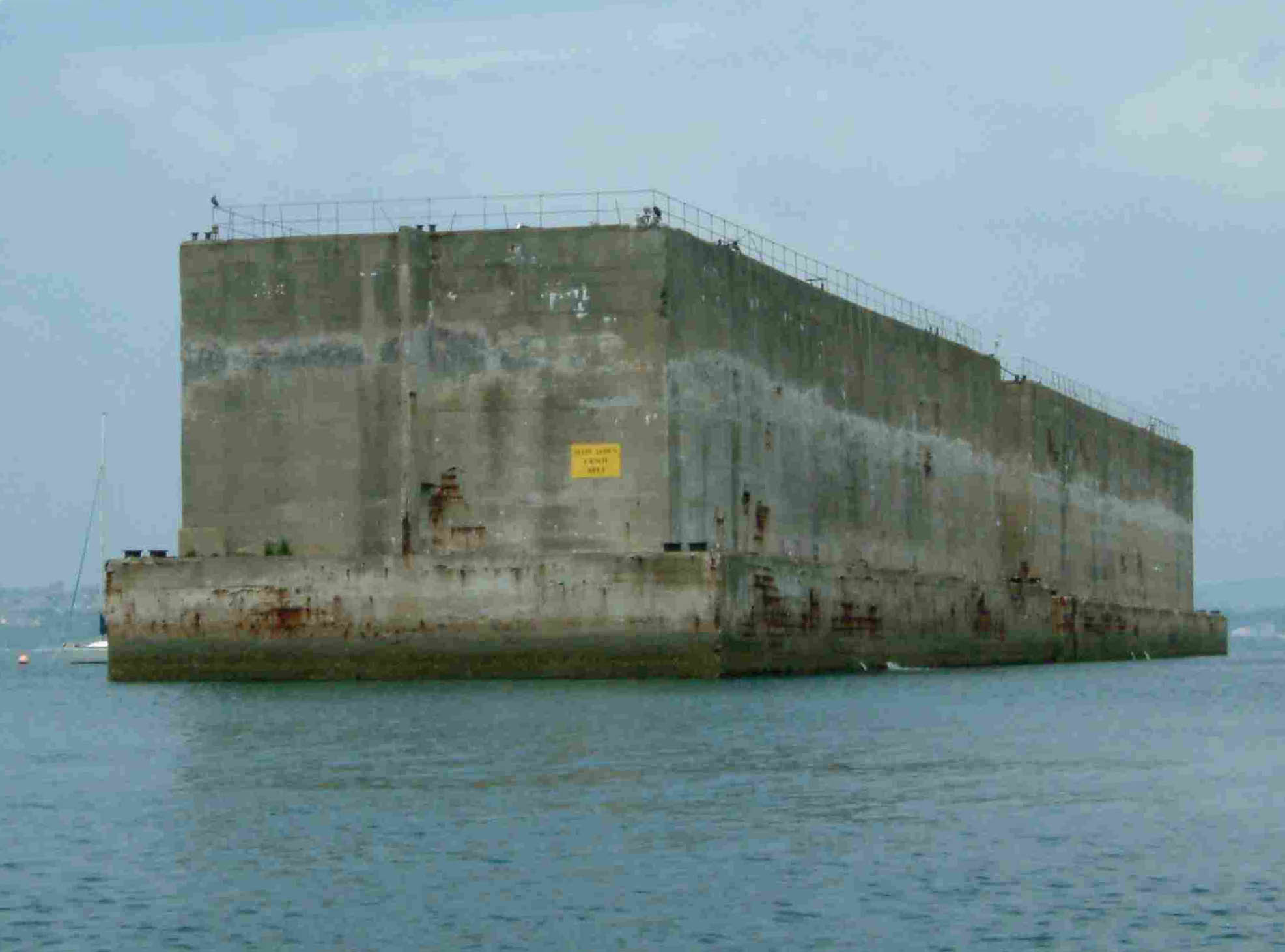
A pair of Phoenixes at Portland Harbour in Dorset

Several Phoenix breakwaters still exist in Britain: two are part of the harbour off Castletown at Portland Harbour in Dorset, and two can be dived in less than 10 metres of water off Pagham in West Sussex. There is also a smaller Phoenix Caisson (type C) in Langstone Harbour in Hampshire.

A wrecked Phoenix breakwater is also to be seen, broken in two, in the Thames estuary off Shoeburyness in Essex. It broke while being towed from Harwich in June 1944. To avoid it causing a hazard to shipping in the Thames estuary, it was beached on the mud on the northern edge of the Thames dredged shipping channel and is about a mile from the beach. Part of it is visible at high tide, but it is topped by a beacon to warn shipping of its presence.

Several Phoenix breakwaters were used in the Netherlands to plug gaps in the dykes, four of them for a dyke at Ouwerkerk after the North Sea Flood of 1 February 1953. These four have now been converted into a museum for the floods called the Watersnoodmuseum, with visitors able to walk through the four caissons.

Two of the B1 type Phoenix breakwaters (73 and 74) were sold and towed to Sweden in 1949. Raised from Arromanches, they were initially towed to Frihamnen port in Stockholm and moved on 20 September 1956 to the newly-built heat and power plant in Hässelby where they remain as of 2021.

Four surplus caissons were used in a breakwater at Akranes, Iceland. Three were towed and delivered by mid August 1946, with the fourth following shortly.

== See also ==
- Mulberry harbours
