= Nieuwerkerk =

- Village
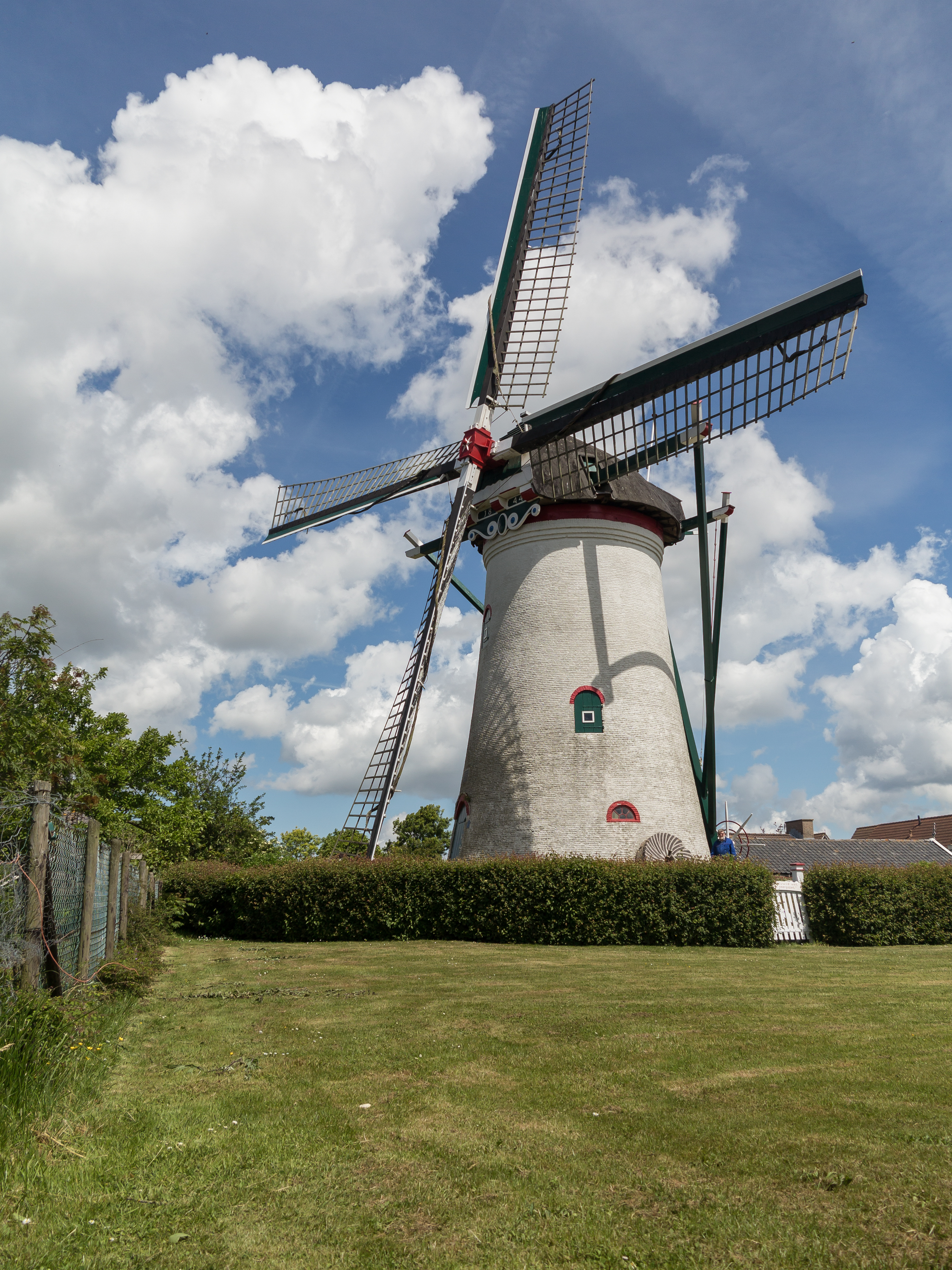
- Windmill: Nieuwerkerkse Molen

- Coat of arms

- Location in the province of Zeeland in the Netherlands Nieuwerkerk (Netherlands)
- Coordinates: 51°38′55″N 4°0′4″E
- Country: Netherlands
- Province: Zeeland
- Municipality: Schouwen-Duiveland

Area
  - Total: 17.81 km^{2} (6.88 sq mi)
- Elevation: 0.0 m (0 ft)

Population (2021)
  - Total: 2,720
  - Density: 153/km^{2} (396/sq mi)
- Time zone: UTC+1 (CET)
  - Summer (DST): UTC+2 (CEST)
- Postal code: 4306
- Dialing code: 0111

Nieuwerkerk is a village in the Dutch province of Zeeland. It is a part of the municipality of Schouwen-Duiveland, and lies about 23 km south of Hellevoetsluis.

Nieuwerkerk was a separate municipality until 1961, when the new municipality of Duiveland was created.

== History ==
Nieuwerkerk was created in the 12th century. It was a split-off from Ouwerkerk. The fifteenth-century Protestant church, originally dedicated to John (evangelist), has an 6 sided tower. It was rebuilt in 1975 on the foundations of the original tower, which was blown up in 1945 by the Germans.

During the North Sea flood of 1953, approximately 265 of the 1,800 residents drowned or went missing.

== Churches ==
There are 4 church congregations in Nieuwerkerk:

- Reformed Church, the church is in the Molenstraat.
- Reformed Church in the Netherlands, this church is in the Stationstraat.
- Hersteld Hervormde Kerk, this church is in the Ooststraat.
- Protestantse Kerk, this church is in the Kerkring.

In the Molenstraat is a small church for the Katholieke Apostolische Gemeente. However, this church is almost never used.

== Gallery ==
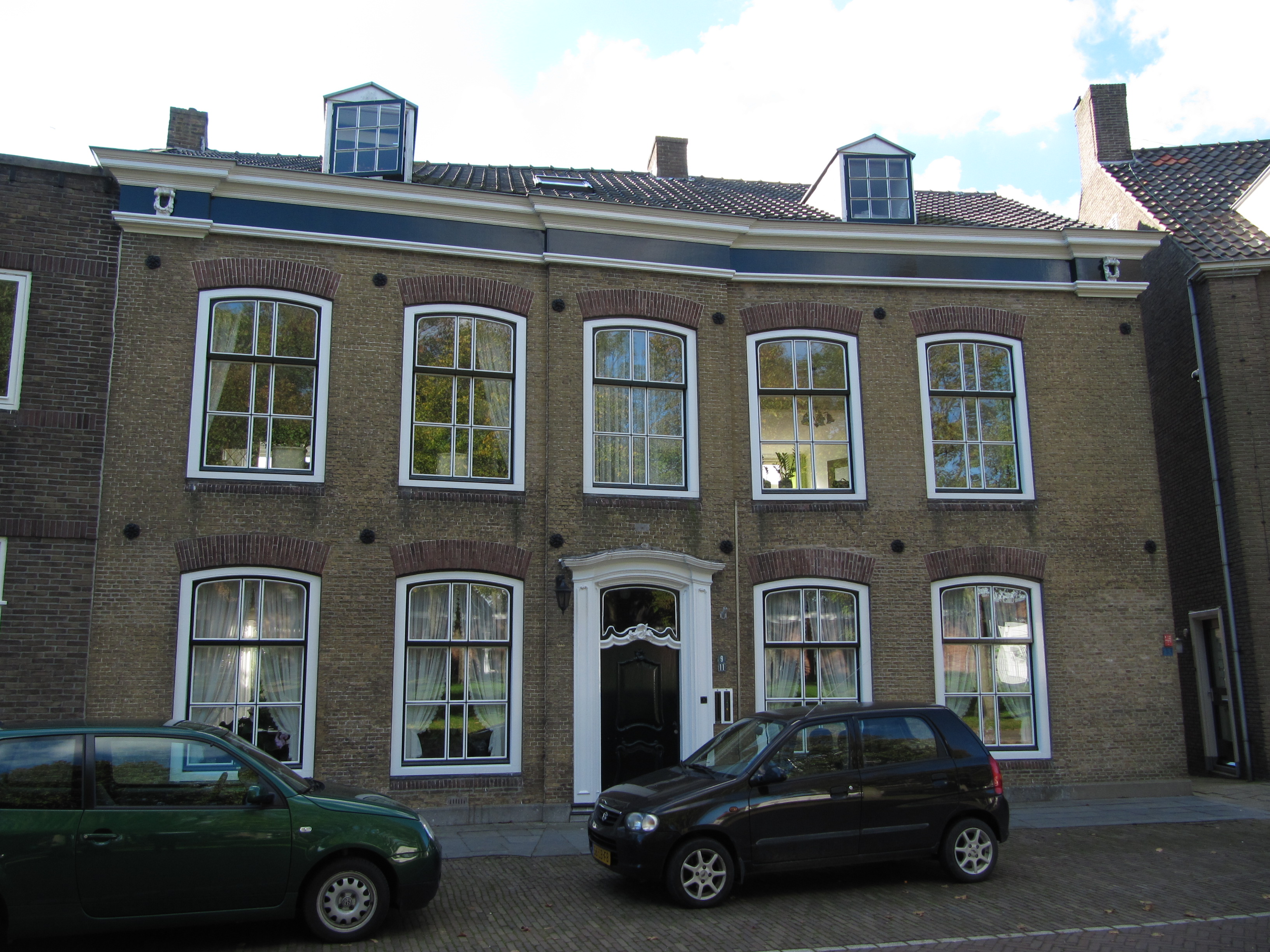
Building in Nieuwerkerk

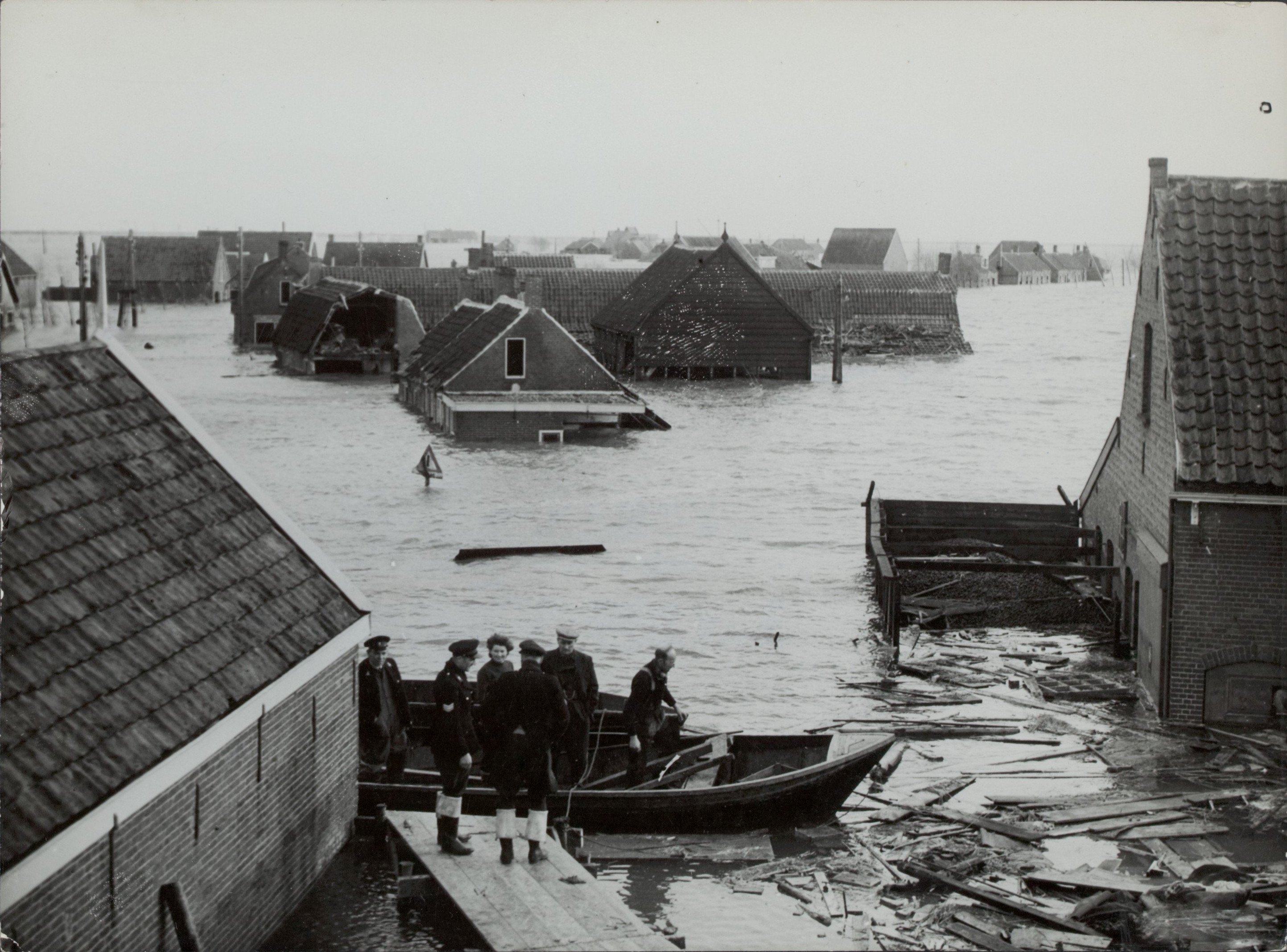
Nieuwerkerk after the 1953 flood (7 April 1953)

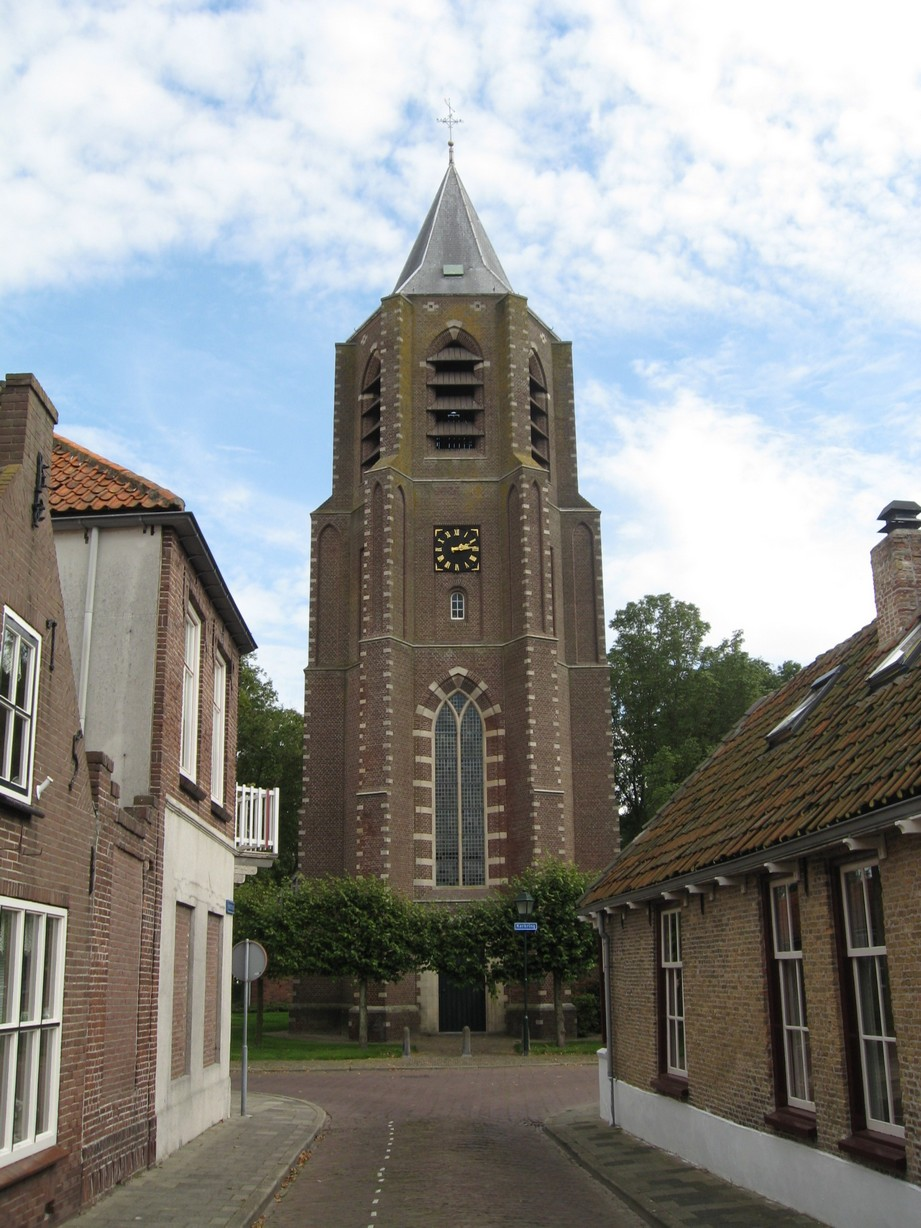
Dutch Reformed church

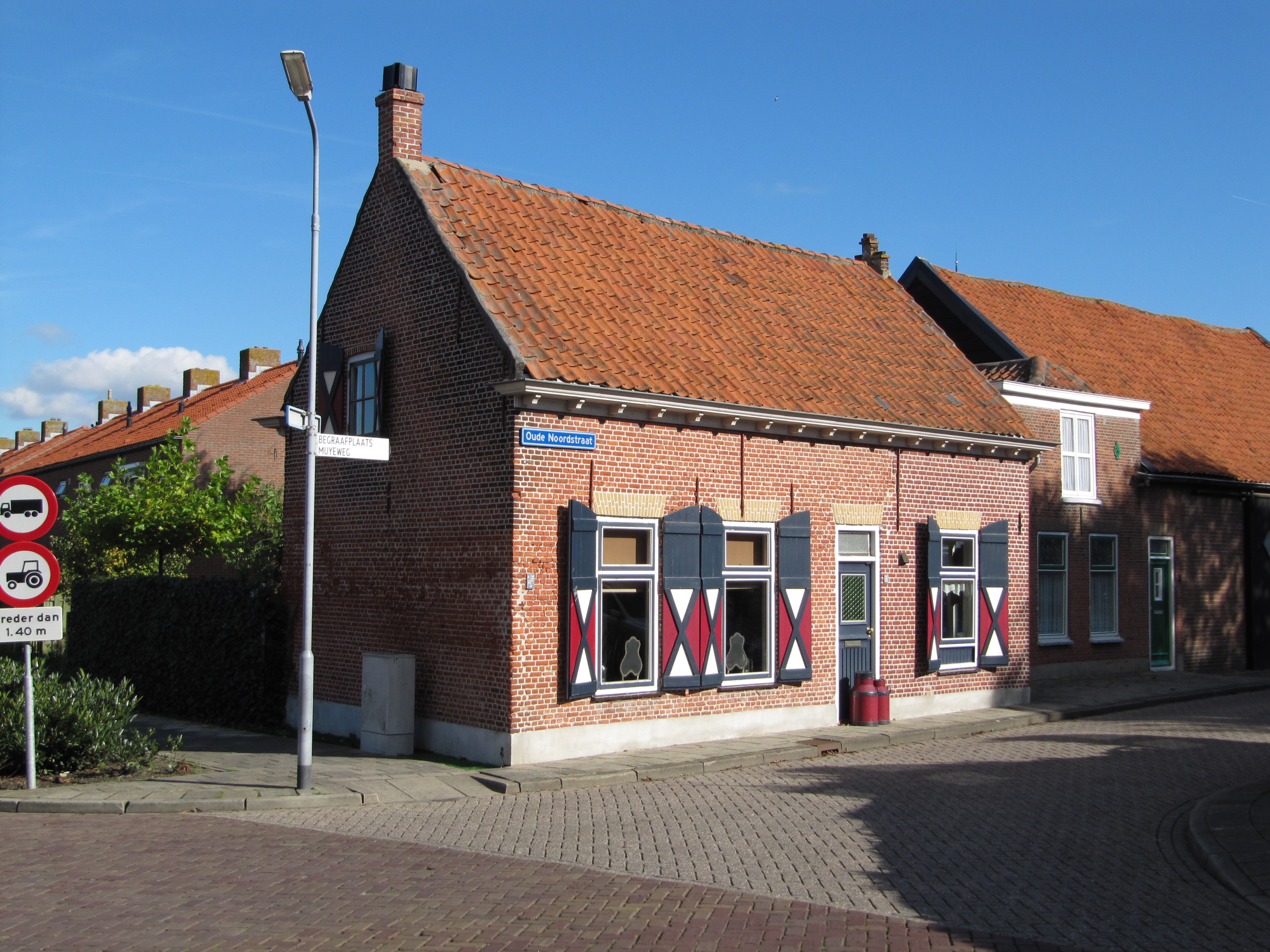
House in Nieuwerkerk
