= Oosterland, Zeeland =

Oosterland
- Village
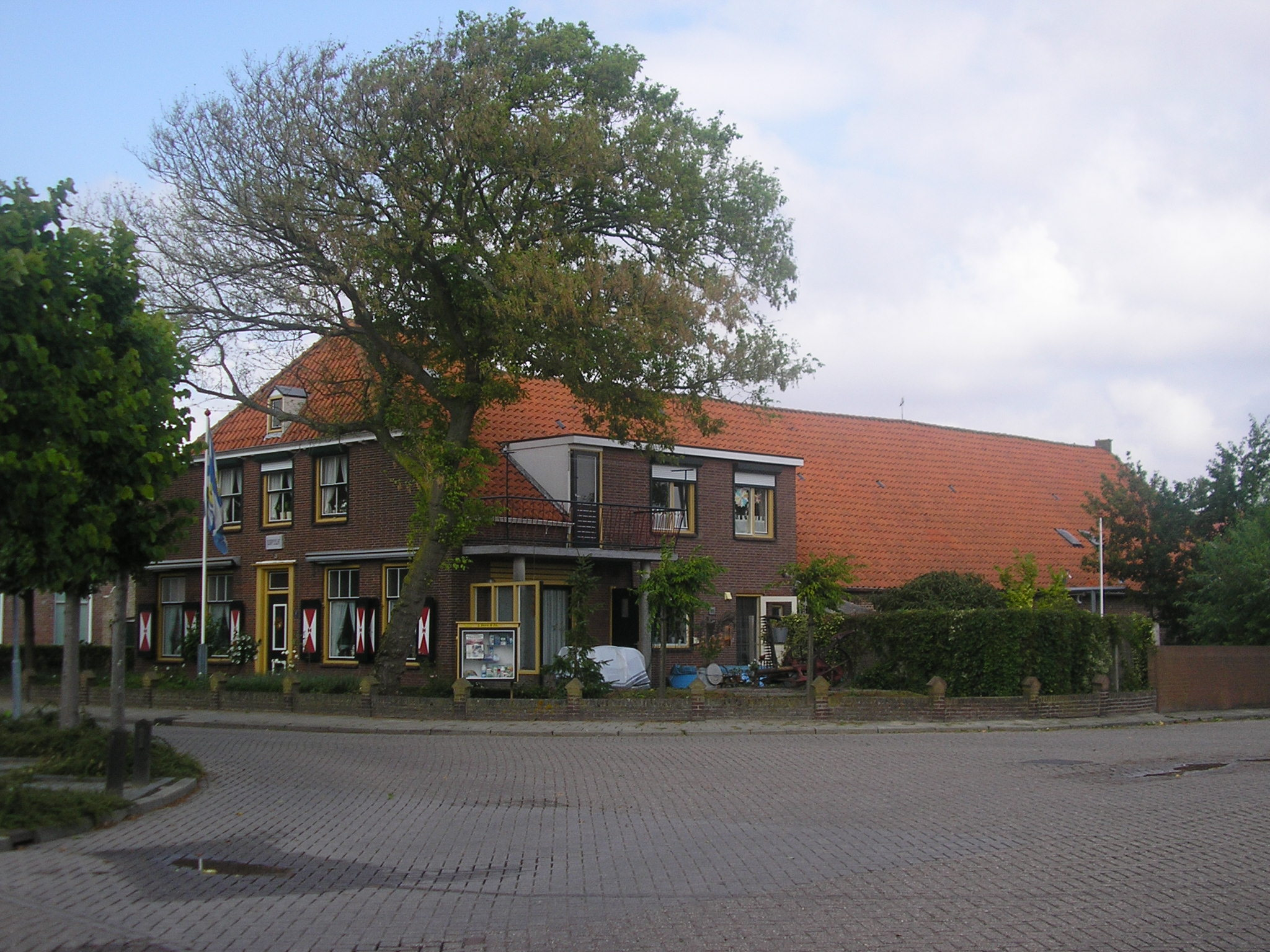
- Farm in Oosterland

- Coat of arms

- Location in the province of Zeeland in the Netherlands Oosterland (Netherlands)
- Coordinates: 51°38′58″N 4°2′8″E
- Country: Netherlands
- Province: Zeeland
- Municipality: Schouwen-Duiveland

Area
  - Total: 13.45 km^{2} (5.19 sq mi)
- Elevation: 0.0 m (0 ft)

Population (2021)
  - Total: 2,310
  - Density: 172/km^{2} (445/sq mi)
- Time zone: UTC+1 (CET)
  - Summer (DST): UTC+2 (CEST)
- Postal code: 4307
- Dialing code: 0111

Oosterland is a village in the south-west Netherlands. It is located in the municipality of Schouwen-Duiveland, Zeeland, about 22 km south of Hellevoetsluis.

== History ==
The village was first mentioned in 1370 as "den ambochte in Oesterer Nuwelant in Duvelant", and means "eastern (polder) land". In 1353, permission was granted to enclose the area with a dike. Oosterland is a road village which developed after 1354.

The Dutch Reformed church has a detached tower from the 14th century, because the original church burnt down in 1612. The tower burnt down in 1945 and was rebuilt between 1948 and 1950. The grist mill of Oosterland was built in 1752. The windmill went out of service after the North Sea flood of 1953. It was restored between 1957 and 1959, and remained in operation until 1965. Since 2017, the windmill has been back in service.

Oosterland was home to 917 people in 1840. The village was bombed in 1945. A large part of the village was destroyed during the North Sea flood of 1953 and later rebuilt further north.

Oosterland was a separate municipality until 1961, when the new municipality of Duiveland was created. In 1997, it became part of the municipality of Schouwen-Duiveland.

== Gallery ==
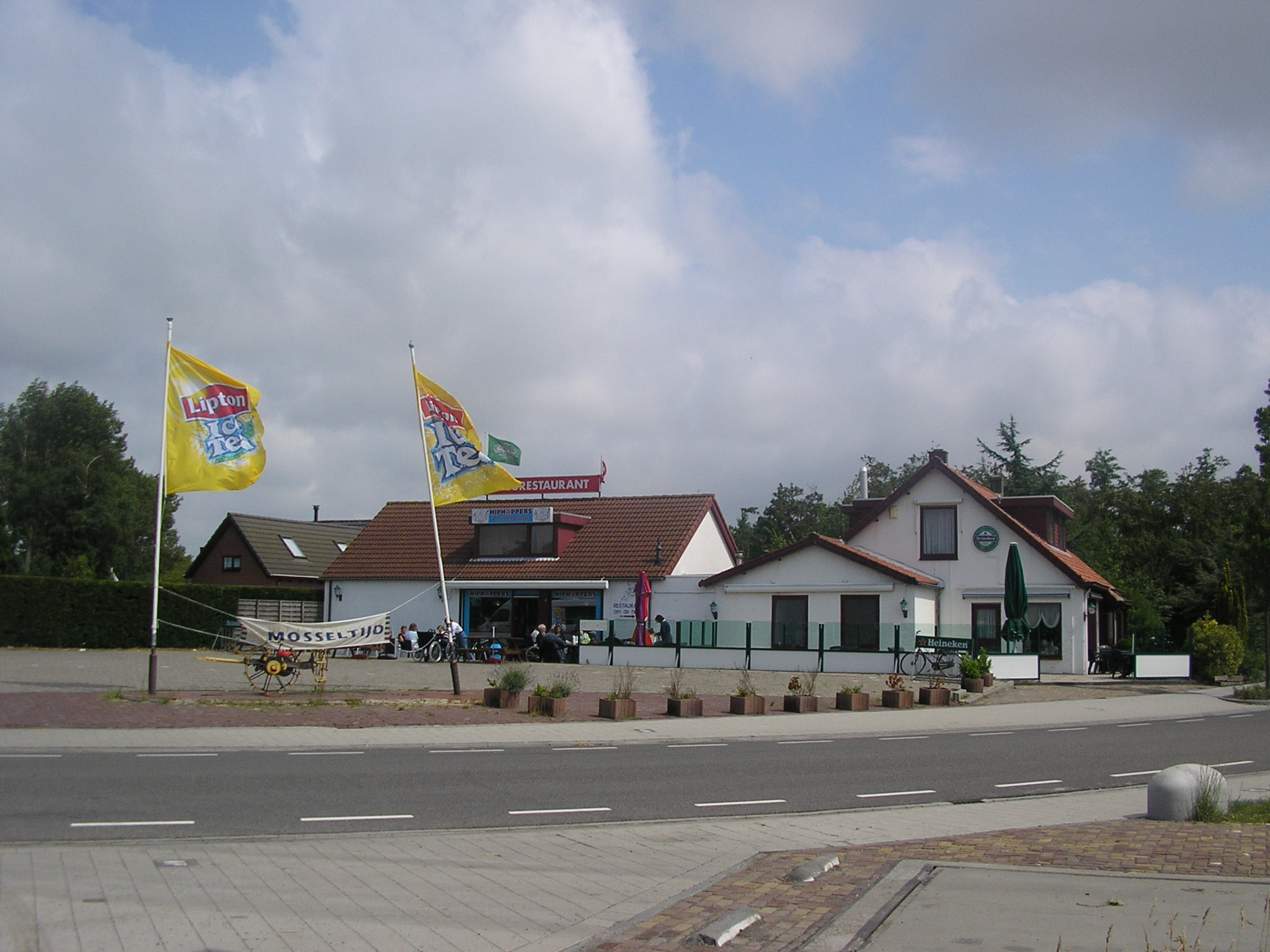
Restaurant in Oosterland

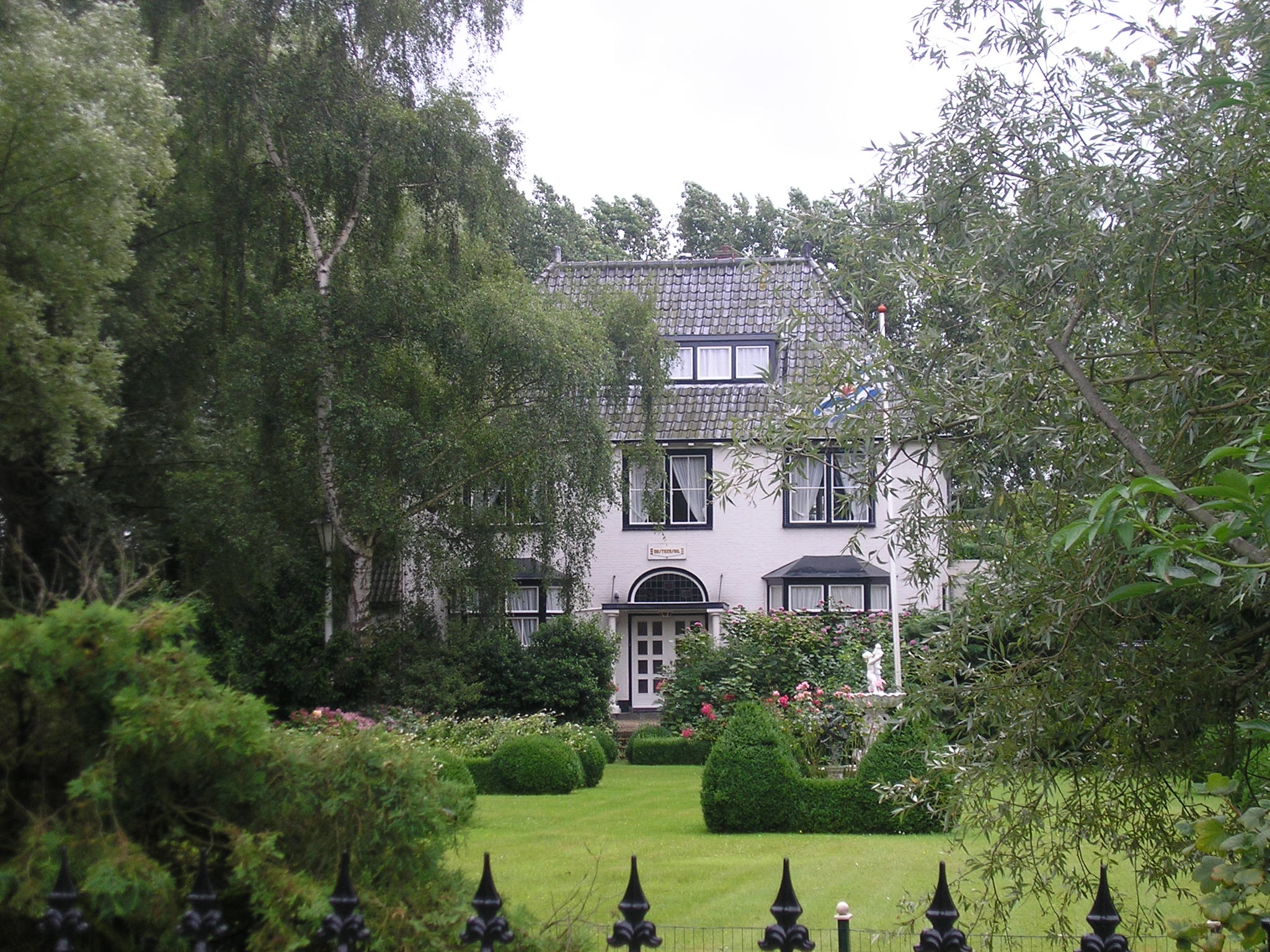
Former town hall

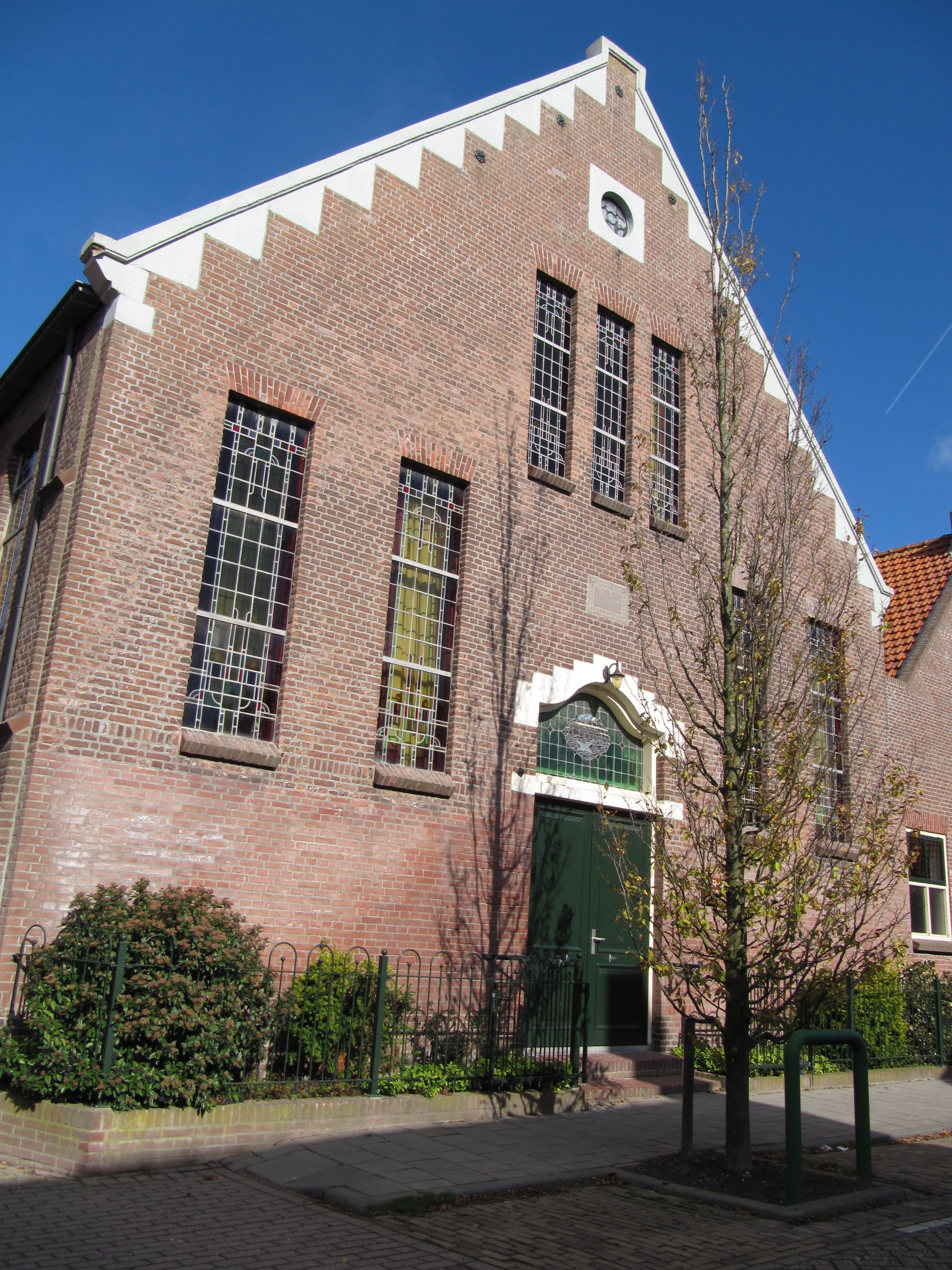
Reformed church

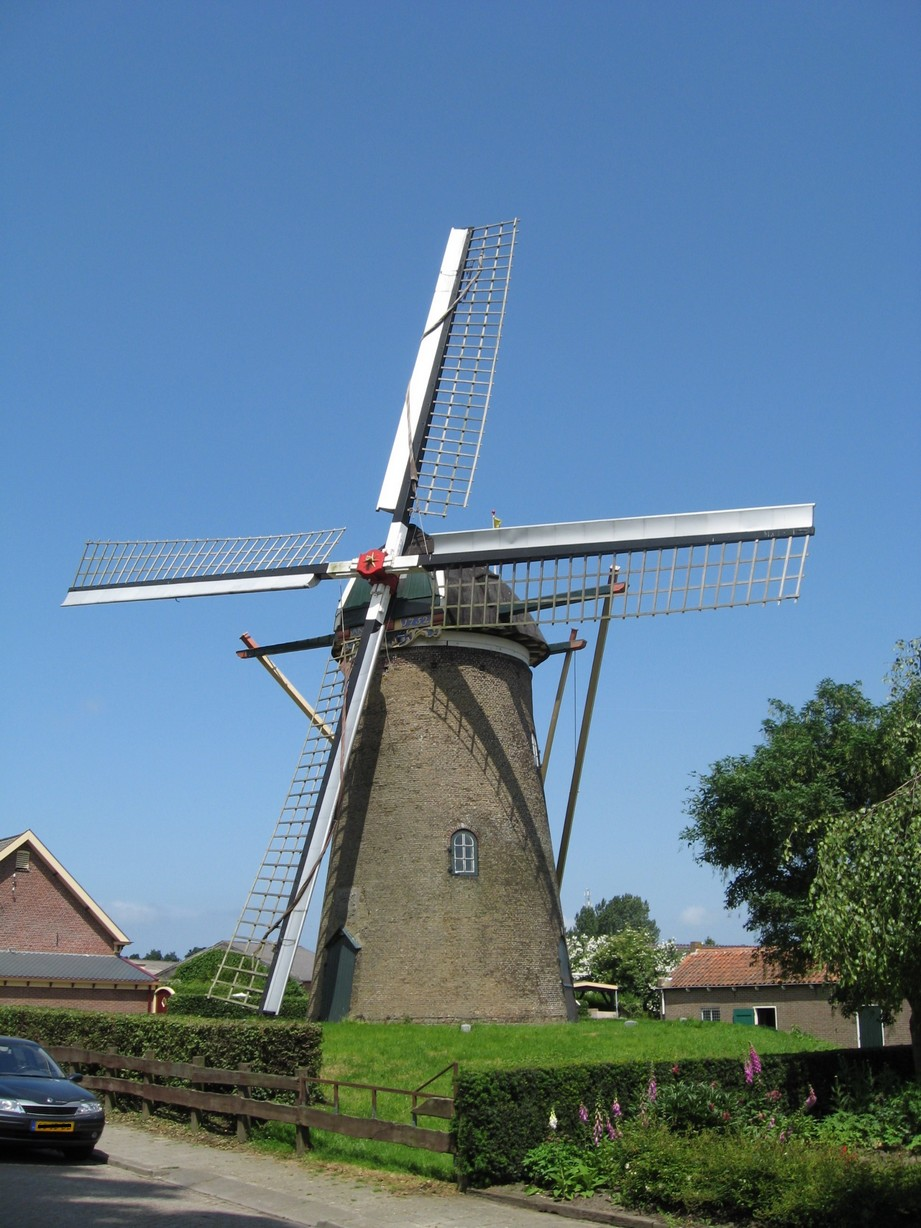
Windmill: Oosterlandse molen
