= Watersnoodmuseum =

Museum in Ouwerkerk, the Netherlands

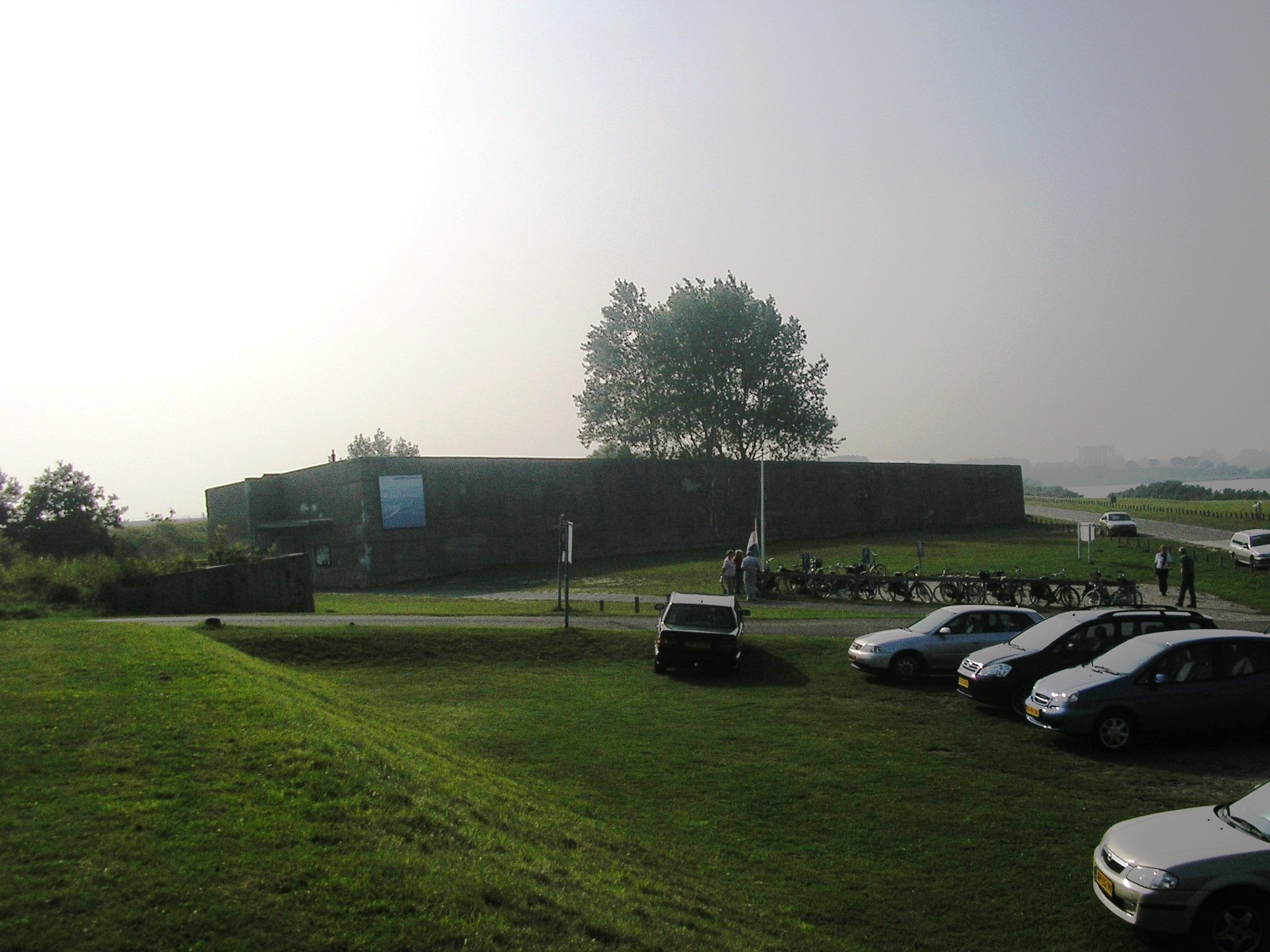
- Established: 2 April 2001
- Location: Ouwerkerk, Netherlands
- Coordinates: 51.617441°N 3.982878°E
- Type: History
- Director: Barbara Oomen
- Website: http://www.watersnoodmuseum.nl/

The Watersnoodmuseum or Flood Museum is the Dutch national knowledge and remembrance centre for the flood of 1 February 1953. The museum was officially opened on 2 April 2001. It welcomes around 100.000 visitors yearly and also educates visitors about water safety and the collects global knowledge about flooding.

The museum is located on the dike south of the village of Ouwerkerk. It is uniquely housed in the four caissons used to close the last gap in the dike following the flood.

== History ==
=== 1993–2002: Beginnings ===
After the 40-year commemoration of the flood in 1993, a working group was formed under the leadership of Ria Geluk. In 1997, this group managed to get the museum project off the ground. A group of volunteers led by Evert Joosse, an architect from Kloetinge, started the Flood Museum in one of the caissons.

In September and October 2000 a trial opening took place with the intention of letting the audience experience what the museum would be like. The facility was completed the following year. On 2 April 2001 the museum was officially opened by Monique de Vries, Minister of Transport, in the presence of volunteers, sponsors and invited guests.

The Phoenix caissons were designed by the British in the Second World War to form Phoenix breakwaters as part of the artificial Mulberry harbours that were assembled as part of the follow-up to the Normandy landings, but these four reinforced concrete caissons were not used in the war. Instead they were used to close the last gap in the dike at Ouwerkerk in November 1953; these are the caissons that house the museum.

=== 2003–2015: National Monument ===
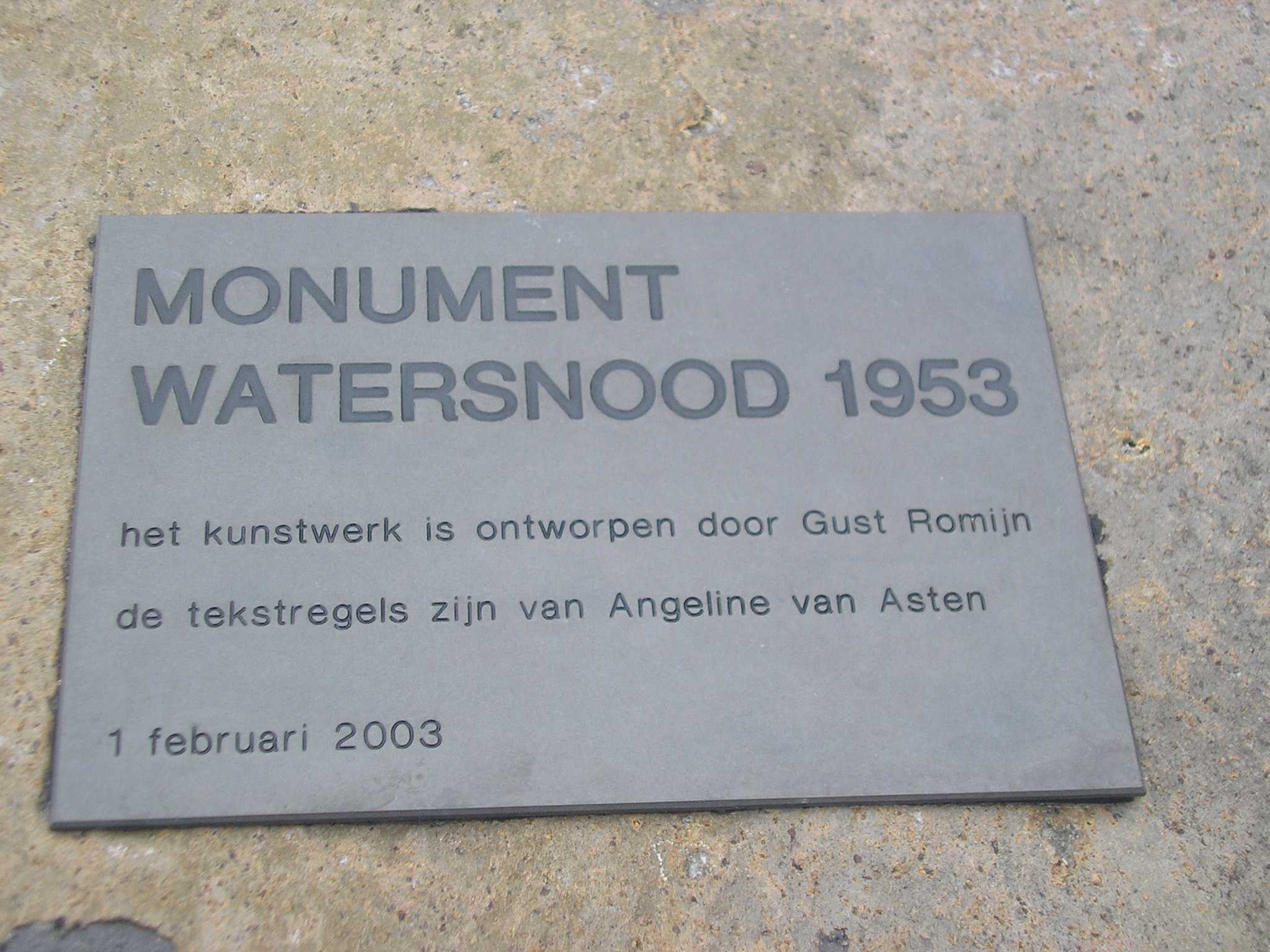
Ouwerkerk Watersnood monument 1953 – Weg van de Buitenlandse Pers

On November 6, 2003, fifty years after the closure of the last hole in the dike at Ouwerkerk, Minister Remkes declared the four caissons and the surrounding area a National Monument to the 1953 flood. In order to promote the interests of the National Monument, the Stichting Caissons Ouwerkerk (Foundation Caissons in Ouwerkerk) changed its name to Stichting Nationaal Monument Watersnood 1953 (Foundation National Monument of the 1953 Flood) and amended the articles of association. The surrounding area is also part of the National Monument. The creeks, a section of the old seawall, the reinforcements, the new seawall and the nature reserve surrounding the creeks all demonstrate the results of the flood of 1 February 1953.

Between July 2008 and April 2009 the Flood Museum was expanded from one to all four caissons, and it was reopened on 23 April 2009 by Prime Minister Jan Peter Balkenende. The caissons are connected via underground corridors. In 2011, the Watersnoodmuseum won the Siletto Award.

=== Since 2016: National Knowledge and Memorial Centre ===
On January 30, 2016, the Flood Museum was designated as the "National Knowledge and Memorial Centre for the Flood of 1953" by the Minister for Infrastructure and Environment, Melanie Schultz van Haegen. Today, the museum hosts many conferences and seminars on water resilience.

== Exhibits ==
The Flood Museum's collection is divided between the four caissons in Ouwerkerk, each with its own theme. The first three caissons deal with the 1953 flood with the following themes: facts, emotions and reconstruction. The last caisson focusses on the future and how to live with water.

=== Caisson 1: Facts ===
The first caisson tells the story and background of the disaster which occurred on the night of 1 February 1953. There is also information on the first days after the storm: the temporary sealing of the dike hole with sandbags, the hundreds of boats that picked up victims from everywhere, and the aid that flowed quickly from many places. This caisson is also home to some of the historical footage taken by the Polygoon newsreel company as well as books and newspaper clippings.

=== Caisson 2: Emotions ===
The second caisson focuses on the people: the story of the victims and the impact on the survivors. The personal stories of the victims are told in the multimedia monument 1835+1. The "+1" refers to a baby known to have been born that night, but lost and never named. The niches along the corridor reflect the enormous impact of the disaster on those who survived the flood. Here are included the names of all victims, the monuments that were created throughout the affected area, and contemporary photographs.

Also, the vigor of the people in their response is remembered: the relief supplies from around the world, thousands of volunteers, the repair of the dike and clean up after the devastation. At the end of the second caisson is information about the use of the caissons in the disaster area and the sealing of the gap at Ouwerkerk.

=== Caisson 3: Reconstruction ===
Caisson 3 tells the story of the reconstruction: the restoration of dikes and houses, and the redevelopment of the devastated landscape, the villages and towns. In the caisson is a replica, with original details, from one of the many pre-fabricated houses that were donated after the disaster (in particular from Scandinavia). Next to the house are machinery and equipment which were used in the dike repair.

The latter part of the third caisson bridges the gap between 1953 and the present: changes in society, the modernisation of daily life and the new approach to water management in the Netherlands.

=== Caisson 4: Future ===
In the last caisson, the future of the Rhine–Meuse–Scheldt delta is the main theme. Touchscreen tables, large screens and a reality-based game show how innovative projects in the field of safety, living and working, and nature influence and reinforce each other. The exhibition was renewed and re-opened on 1 February 2013 and is permanently updated. Rijkswaterstaat, closely involved with national water management, donated the display devices to the museum. The 4th caisson contains many interactive exhibits that educate children and adults on living with water.

At the end of the fourth caisson is the museum shop. Information from Staatsbosbeheer, the government agency responsible for forestry and nature reserves, and the Oosterschelde National Park is also available nearby. Visitors to the museum can easily walk to the waterside, to learn about dike building and underwater nature.
