= Ouwerkerk =

- Village
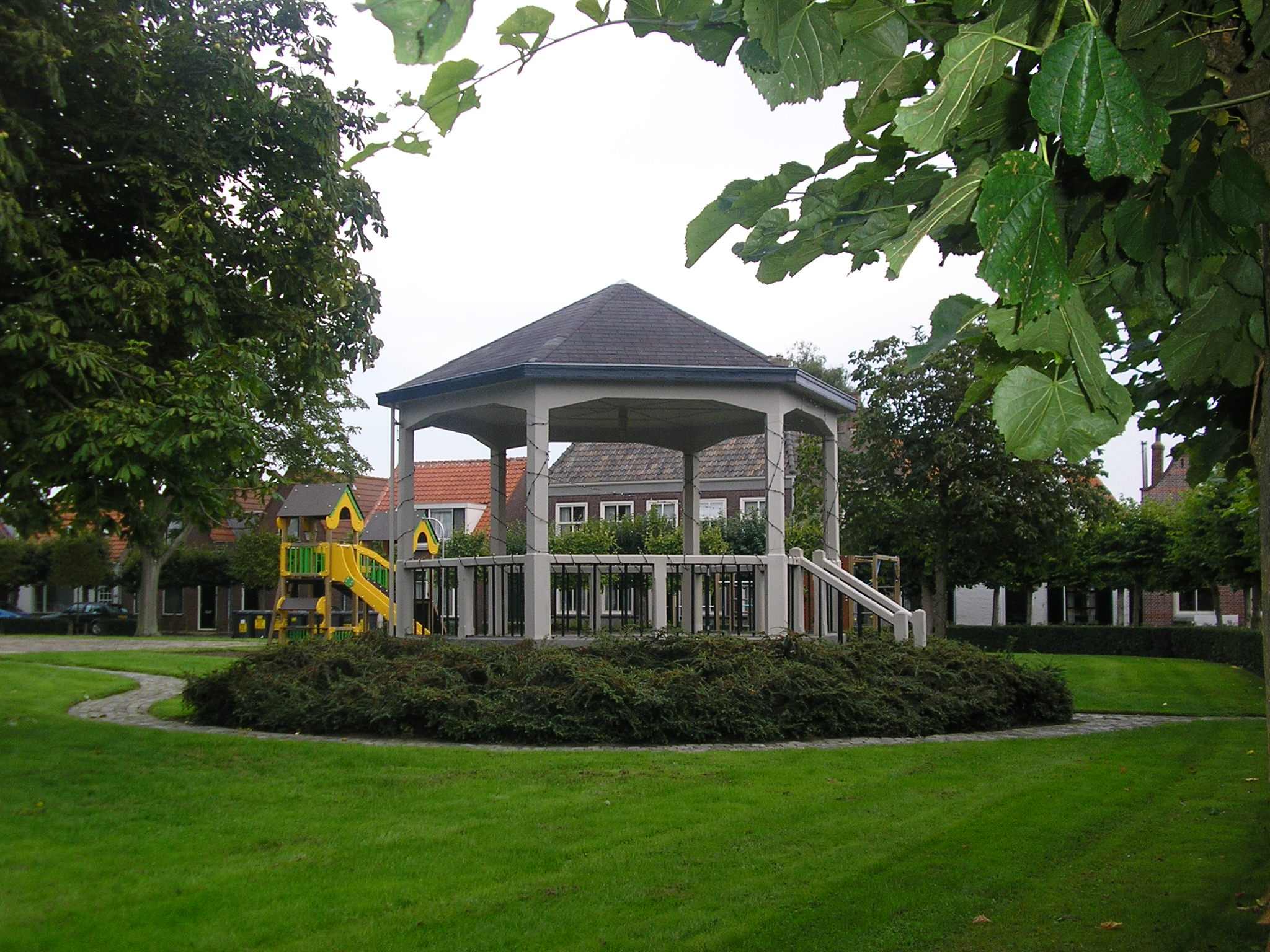
- Bandstand

- Coat of arms

- Location in the province of Zeeland in the Netherlands Ouwerkerk (Netherlands)
- Coordinates: 51°37′28″N 3°58′58″E
- Country: Netherlands
- Province: Zeeland
- Municipality: Schouwen-Duiveland

Area
  - Total: 10.69 km^{2} (4.13 sq mi)
- Elevation: −0.3 m (−0.98 ft)

Population (2021)
  - Total: 575
  - Density: 53.8/km^{2} (139/sq mi)
- Time zone: UTC+1 (CET)
  - Summer (DST): UTC+2 (CEST)
- Postal code: 4305
- Dialing code: 0111

Ouwerkerk is a village in the southwest Netherlands. It is located in the municipality of Schouwen-Duiveland, Zeeland about 60 km south of Rotterdam.

== History ==
Ouwerkerk is the oldest village of the former island of Duiveland, possibly founded in the eleventh century. The village got its current name after a church was built in Nieuwerkerk. The name of Ouwerkerk before the establishment of Nieuwerkerk is unknown. Ouwerkerk was built as a rundling with a church in the center of the surviving Ring.

The medieval tower of the church, originally dedicated to Gertrude the Great, was blown up by German troops in 1945, in a blast that seriously damaged the rest of the church. After World War II, the remains of the church and tower were demolished. In 1956 a new church was built. In 1957 the separate tower was completed.

During the North Sea flood of 1953 Ouwerkerk was hit hard: one in six residents died. Many buildings, including a wooden octagonal flour mill, were lost. The breach of the dike at Ouwerkerk was the last one to be closed in the night of 6 to 7 November 1953.

Ouwerkerk was a separate municipality until 1961, when it was merged with the other villages of the former island of Duiveland, into the municipality of Duiveland. On January 1 1997 Duiveland merged with the five other municipalities into Schouwen-Duiveland.

In the four caissons that were used for the closure of the dike, the Dutch Watersnoodmuseum has been established in 2001. In 2003, at the 50th anniversary of the North Sea flood of 1953, Queen Beatrix visited Ouwerkerk.

=== People from Ouwerkerk ===
- Jacobus Baselius (died in Ouwerkerk), author
- Joost Berman (1793–1855), judge and poet
- Gerardus van Kuilenburg (1598–1645), priest
- Hendrik Sluyters (1807–1859), educator and nonfiction writer

== Culture ==
The Watersnoodmuseum on the south side of the village is its main attraction. To the east of the museum (south-east of Ouwerkerk) are Brasserie De Vierbannen and Camping De Vierbannen. West of the museum (southwest of the village) are Ouwerkerk's beaches on Easter Scheldt.

In 1940 an association football club, SV Ouwerkerk, was established in the village. The club played in the Zesde Klasse in the late 1990s and in the Vijfde Klasse in the early 2000s. In 2015 it celebrated its 75th anniversary.

== Gallery ==
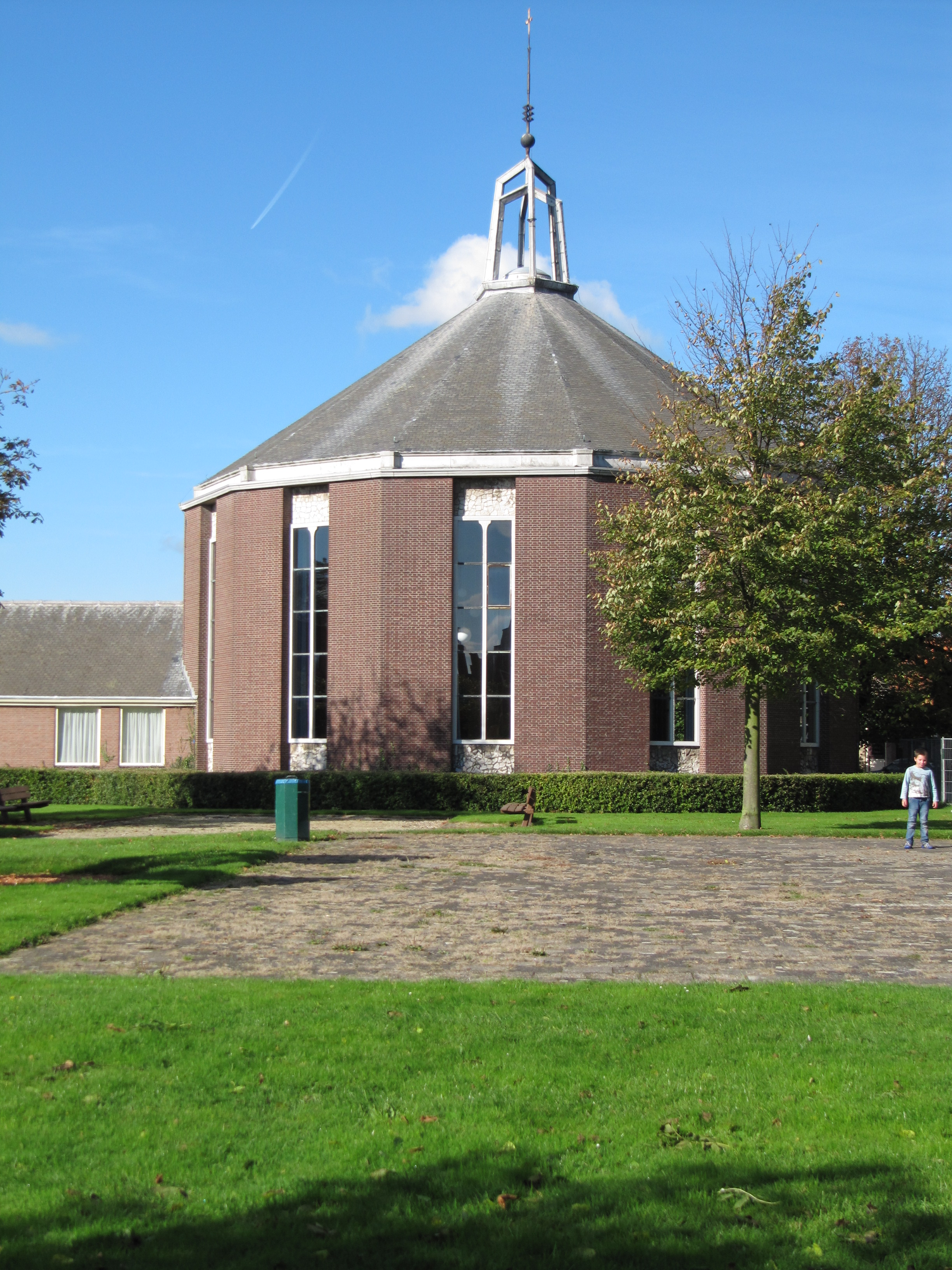
Church in Ouwerkerk

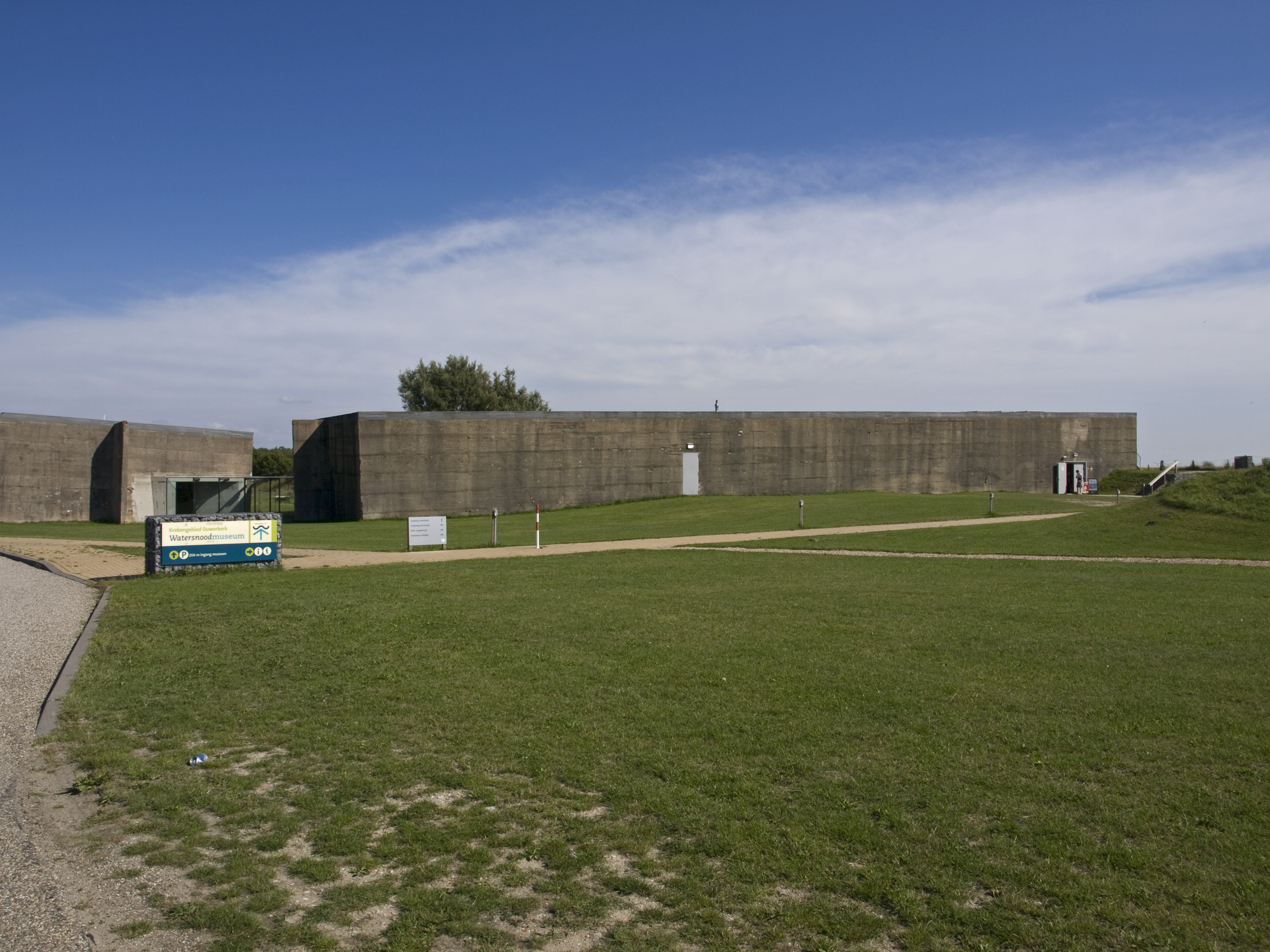
Watersnoodmuseum

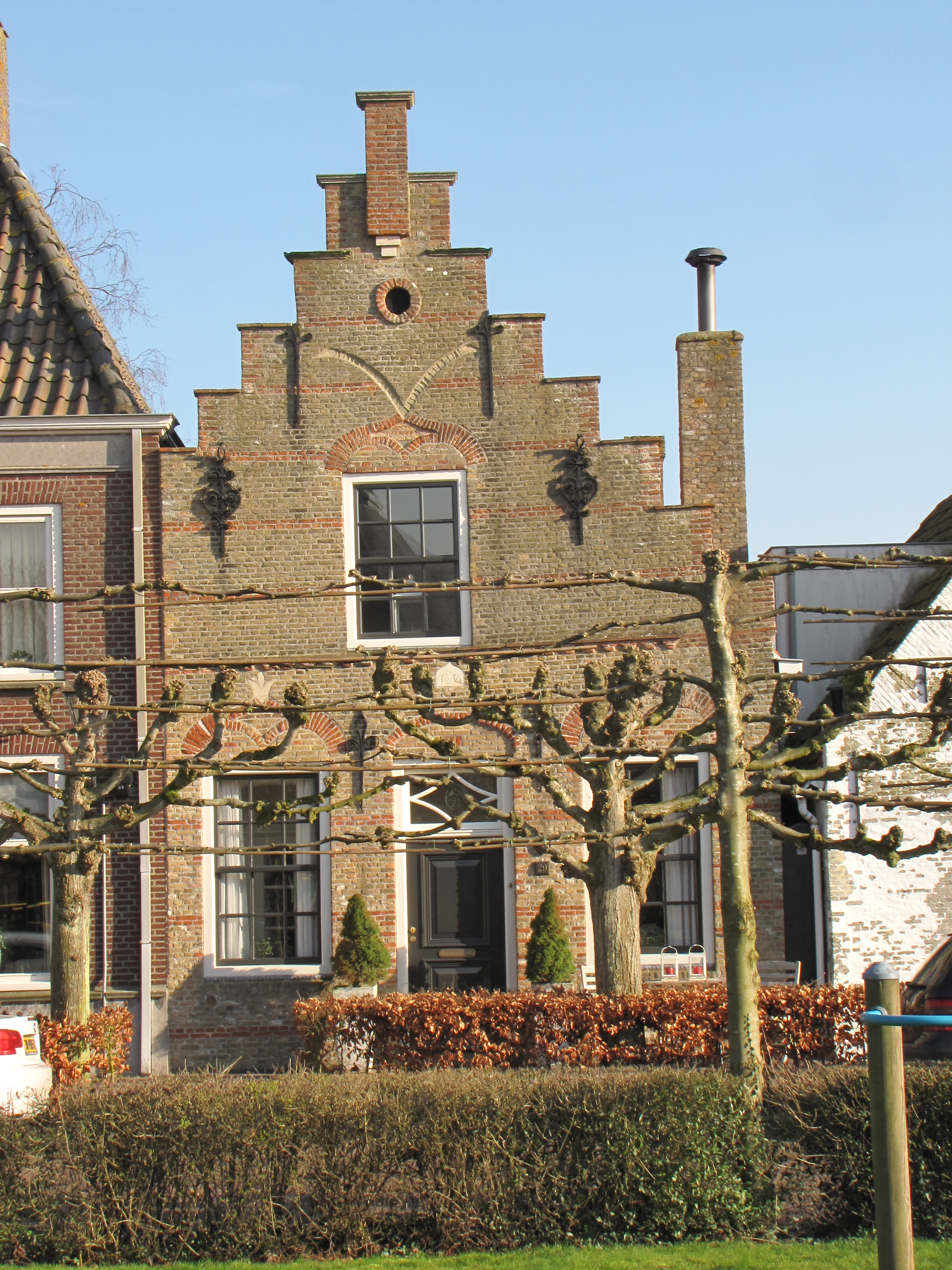
House in Ouwerkerk

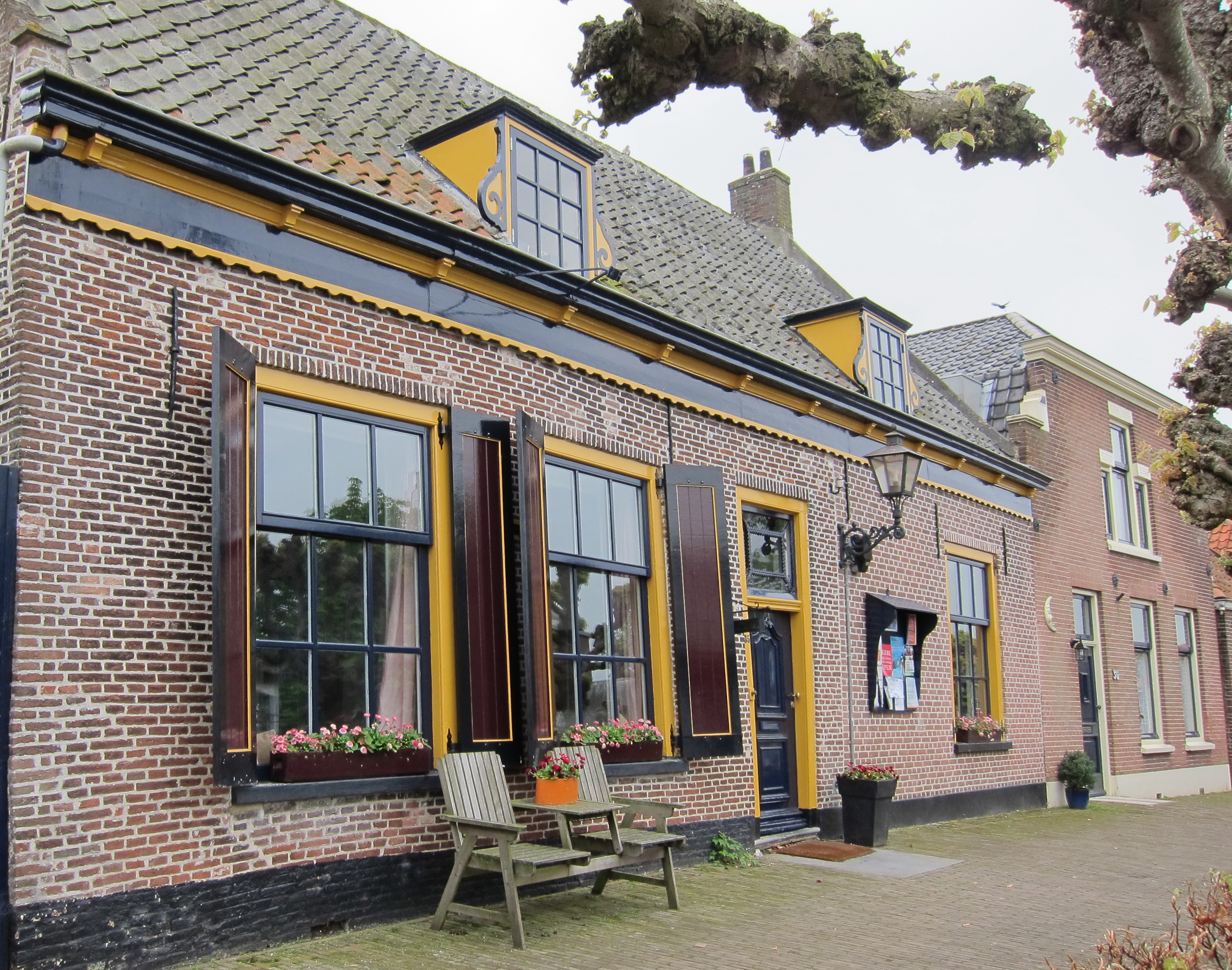
House in Ouwerkerk
