= Duiveland =

Coordinates: 51°39′N 4°01′E

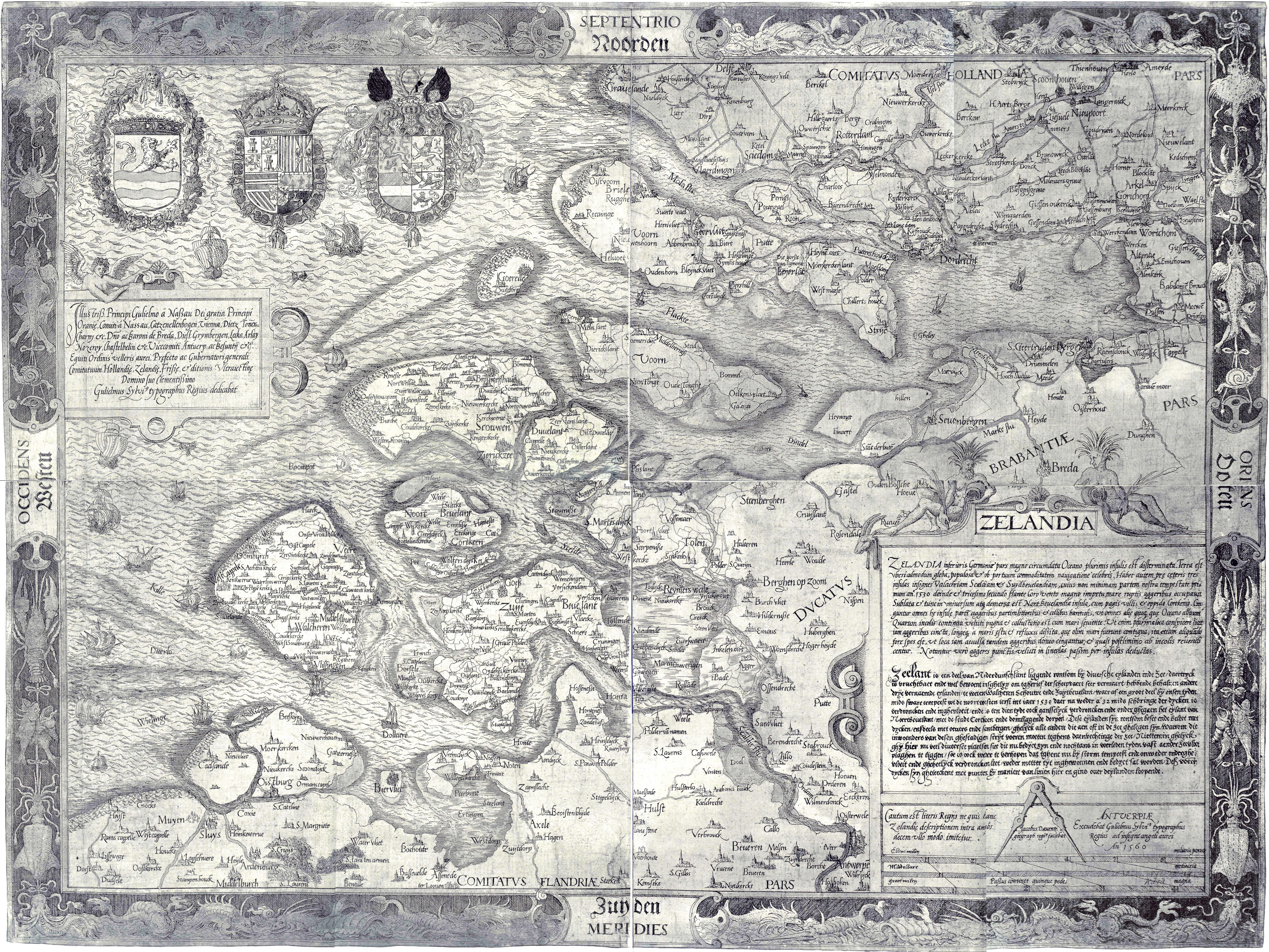
Map of Zeeland, The Netherlands

Duiveland is the name of a former island and a former municipality in the Dutch province of Zeeland.

The island of Duiveland was joined to Schouwen in 1610, forming the island of Schouwen-Duiveland. It is the eastern part of the current island.

The municipality of Duiveland was created in 1961 from the former municipalities of Nieuwerkerk, Ouwerkerk, and Oosterland. In 1997, it merged into the new municipality of Schouwen-Duiveland.
