= Sluis-Aardenburg =

Coordinates: 51.30937°N 3.38791°E

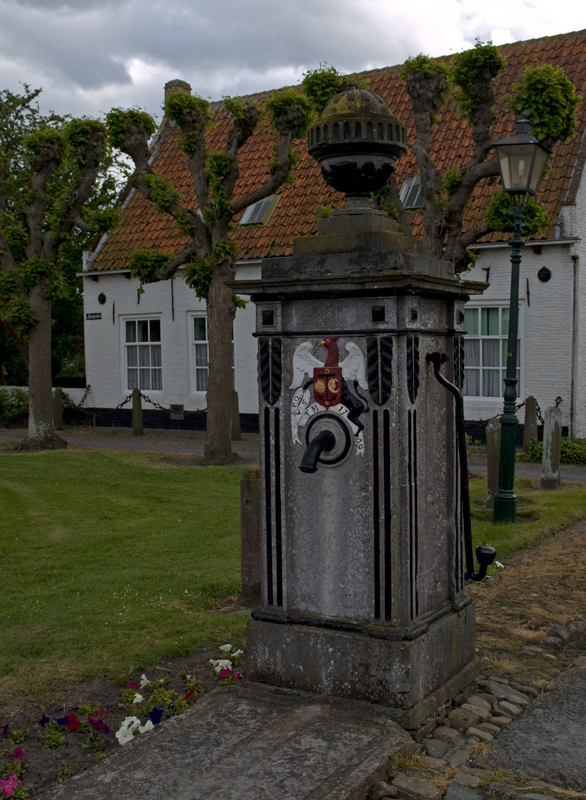
Water pump in Sint Anna ter Muiden

Sluis-Aardenburg was a municipality in the province of Zeeland, in the south-western part of the Netherlands. It was created from a merger of Sluis and Aardenburg in 1995, and it merged with the municipality of Oostburg, on 1 January 2003, to form the new municipality of Sluis. Sluis-Aardenburg covered an area of 83.48 km^{2}, of which 0.89 km^{2} was water.

The municipality comprised the following towns, villages and townships:

- Aardenburg
- Draaiburg
- Eede
- Heille
- Retranchement
- Sint Anna ter Muiden
- Sint Kruis
- Sluis
- Terhofstede
- Zwindorp
