= Oud Sluis =

Coordinates: 51°18′25.7″N 3°23′15.03″E

- Interactive map of Oud Sluis

Restaurant information
- Established: 1989
- Closed: 22 December 2013
- Head chef: Sergio Herman
- Rating: Michelin Guide
- Location: Beestenmarkt 2, Sluis, Netherlands
- Seating capacity: 40

Oud Sluis is a defunct restaurant in Sluis, Netherlands. It was a fine dining restaurant that had been awarded one or more Michelin stars since 1995. It carried one star in the period 1995–1998, two stars in the period 1999–2005 and three stars from 2006.

The chef was Sergio Herman.

The restaurant appeared from 2003 in the list of The S.Pellegrino World's 50 Best Restaurants. In its first ranking it was placed 40th, the ranking for 2011 was 17th.

Since 2008 they have also run a guest house, Casa Chico y Luna, in Sint Anna ter Muiden.

In June 2013, Sergio Herman announced the closure of the restaurant by the end of 2013 to focus on his other projects. He also wants to spend more time with his wife and 4 children. The restaurant finally closed down on 22 December 2013.

== Awards ==
- Michelin Guide – one to three stars since 1995
- World's 50 Best Restaurants – placed 45th to 17th since 2003
- Verybest.com – Very Best Restaurant 2010
- Lekker.nl – Best Dutch Restaurant 2004–2006, 2008–2010
- Gault Millau – 20 points (out of 20) in 2010 and 2011; 19.5 points (out of 20) in 2008 and 2009,

== See also ==
- List of Michelin three starred restaurants
- List of Michelin starred restaurants in the Netherlands
