= Zwin =

Nature reserve on the Belgian–Dutch border

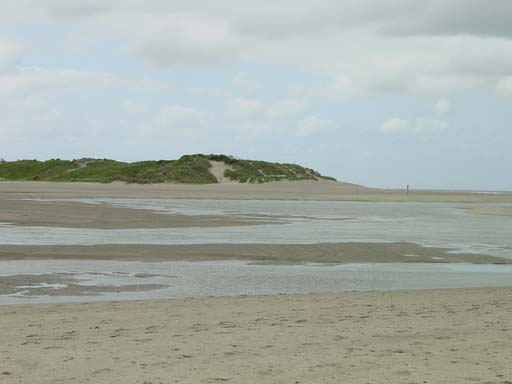
- Zwin at high tide seen from the Dutch to the Belgian side
- Interactive map of Zwin
- Location: Belgian–Dutch border
- Nearest city: Knokke-Heist, Sluis
- Coordinates: 51°21′30″N 3°21′55″E
- Area: 1.58 km^{2} (0.61 sq mi)
- Established: 1952
- Website: www.zwin.be

Ramsar Wetland
- Designated: 4 March 1986
- Reference no.: 328

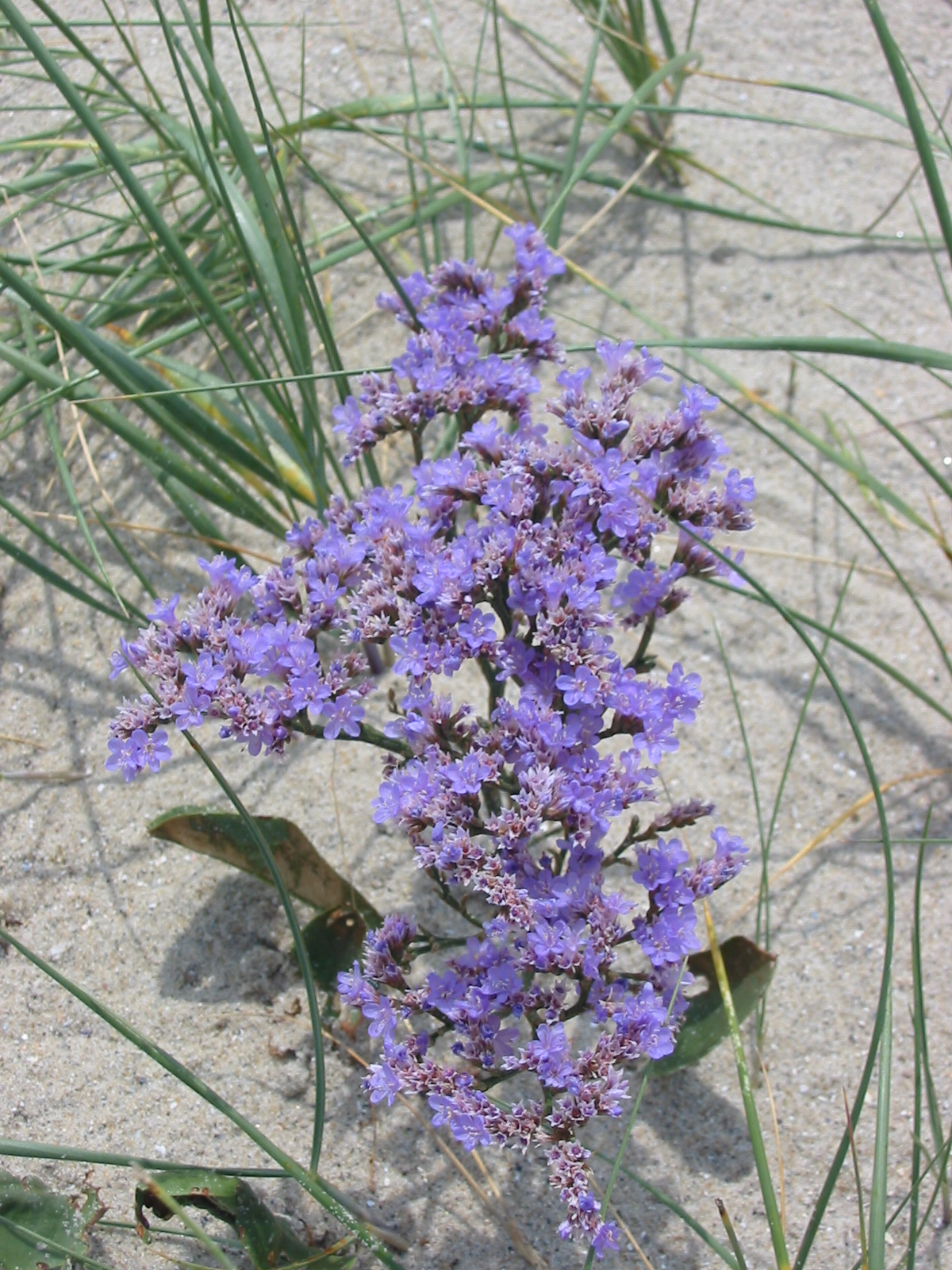
Sea lavender blossoms in August–September

The Zwin (Dutch pronunciation: [zʋɪn]) is a nature reserve at the North Sea coast, on the Belgian–Dutch border. It consists of the entrance area of a former tidal inlet which during the Middle Ages connected the North Sea with the ports of Sluis and Bruges inland.

The Zwin inlet was formed originally by a storm that broke through the Flemish coast in 1134, creating a tidal channel that reached some 15 km inland and was also connected, through another channel, to the mouth of the Scheldt further north-east. The new waterway offered access to the sea to the inland city of Bruges, which consequently rose to become one of the foremost medieval port cities of Europe. The towns of Damme, Sluis and Sint Anna ter Muiden were also located on the Zwin. However, from the late 13th century onwards, the channel was affected by progressive silting, which from around 1500 caused the waterway to become unusable and cut off the harbour of Bruges from the sea.

The present-day nature reserve was founded in 1952. It has an area of 1.25 square kilometres in Knokke-Heist, Belgium and 0.33 square kilometres in Sluis, Netherlands. It is famous for its large variety in salt-resistant flora, such as sea lavender. It is also popular with bird watchers. There is a small zoo with some major domestic birds and it is one of the few places in Belgium with a population of white storks.

In March 1986 it was declared a Wetland of International Importance.

== Sea battles ==
The Battle of Damme was fought on 30 May and 31 May 1213. The success of the English raids ended the threat of a French invasion of England.

The Battle of Sluys was a sea battle fought on 24 June 1340 as one of the opening conflicts of the Hundred Years' War between England and France.

During the Eighty Years' War between the Dutch Republic and Spain, the Battle of Sluys on 26 May 1603 was a naval battle in which a Spanish squadron tried to break through a blockade of the Zwin by Dutch ships.
