= Waterlandkerkje =

- Village
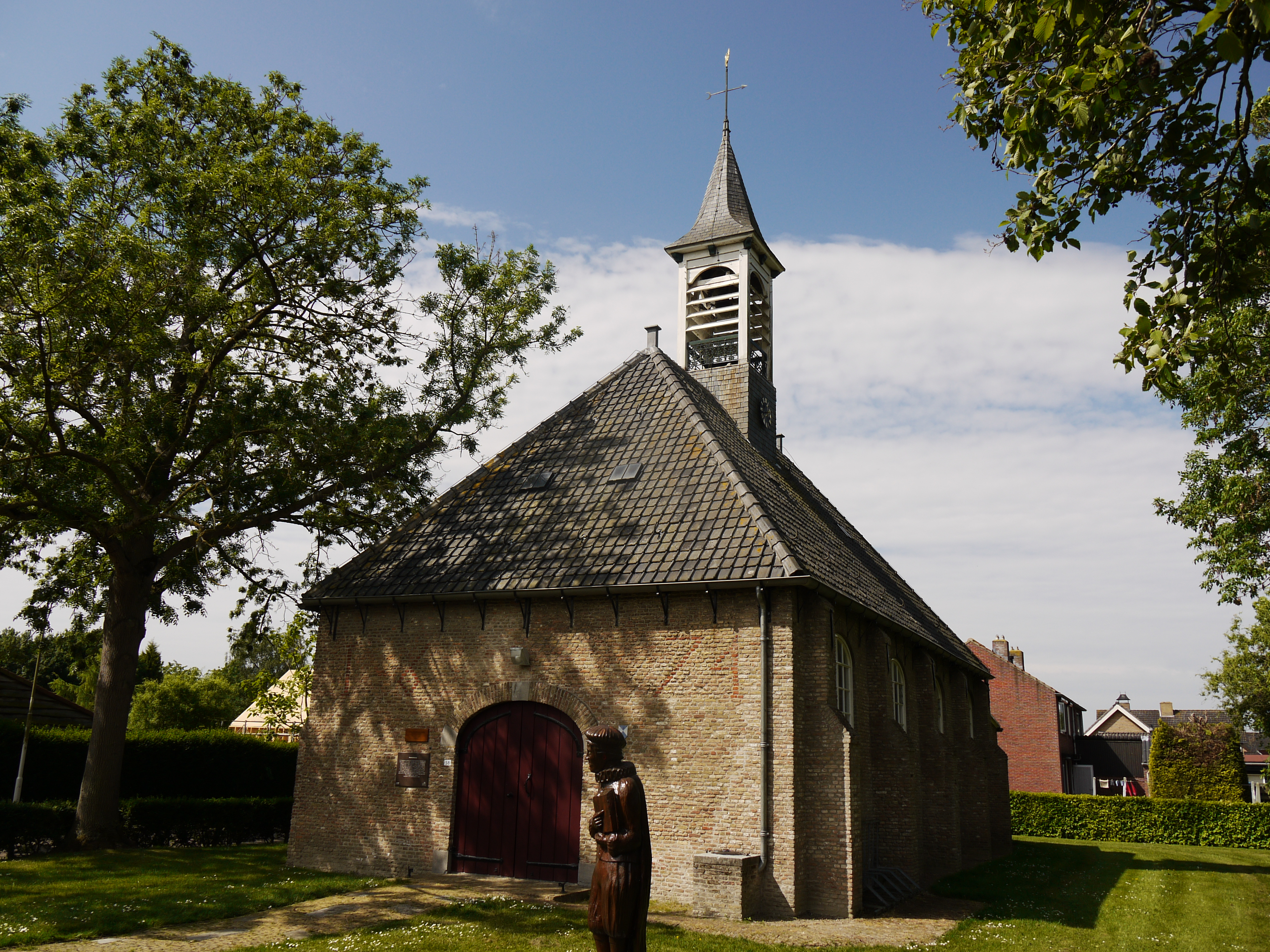
- Dutch Reformed church of Waterlandkerkje

- Flag Coat of arms

- Location in the province of Zeeland in the Netherlands Waterlandkerkje (Netherlands)
- Coordinates: 51°19′3″N 3°33′14″E
- Country: Netherlands
- Province: Zeeland
- Municipality: Sluis

Area
  - Total: 17.25 km^{2} (6.66 sq mi)
- Elevation: 2.3 m (7.5 ft)

Population (2021)
  - Total: 480
  - Density: 28/km^{2} (72/sq mi)
- Time zone: UTC+1 (CET)
  - Summer (DST): UTC+2 (CEST)
- Postal code: 4508
- Dialing code: 0117

Waterlandkerkje is a village in the Dutch province of Zeeland. It is located in the municipality of Sluis.

The village was first mentioned in 1740 as "de Kerk op Waterland, en doorgaans Nieuw of Klein Kerkje geheeten", and means "little church of Waterland". Waterland was a region which was flooded in 1375. The church was established around 1670 by Protestants who went to church in Waterland-Oudeman in the Spanish Netherlands (nowadays: Belgium), but who were removed by force by the Catholics. The church originally stood in Waterland-Oudeman but was moved across the border. The church burned down in 1708, and was rebuilt in 1713.

Waterlandkerkje was a separate municipality until 1970, when it was merged with Oostburg. In 2003, it became part of the municipality of Sluis.

== Gallery ==
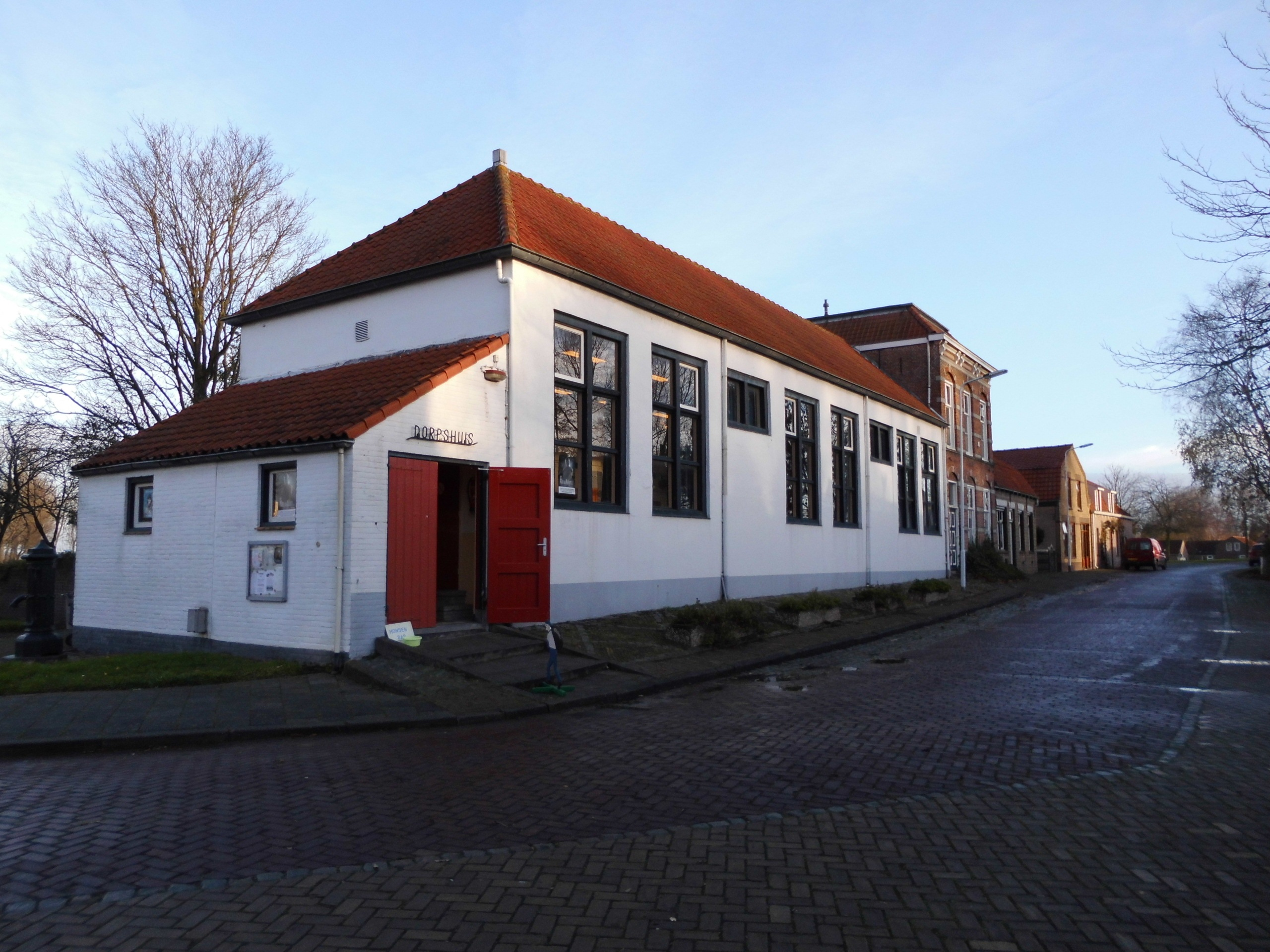
Village house

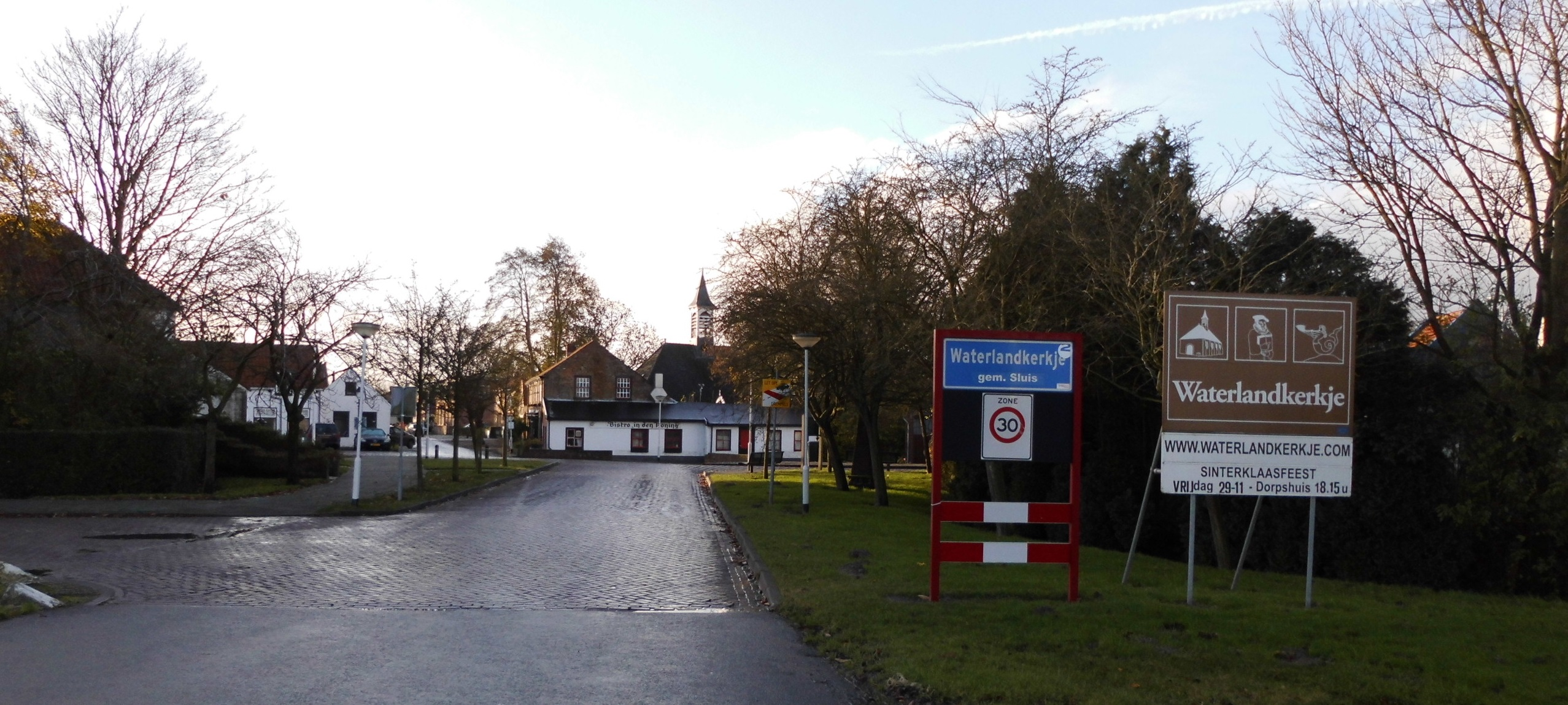
Welcome to Waterlandkerkje
