= Retranchement =

- Village
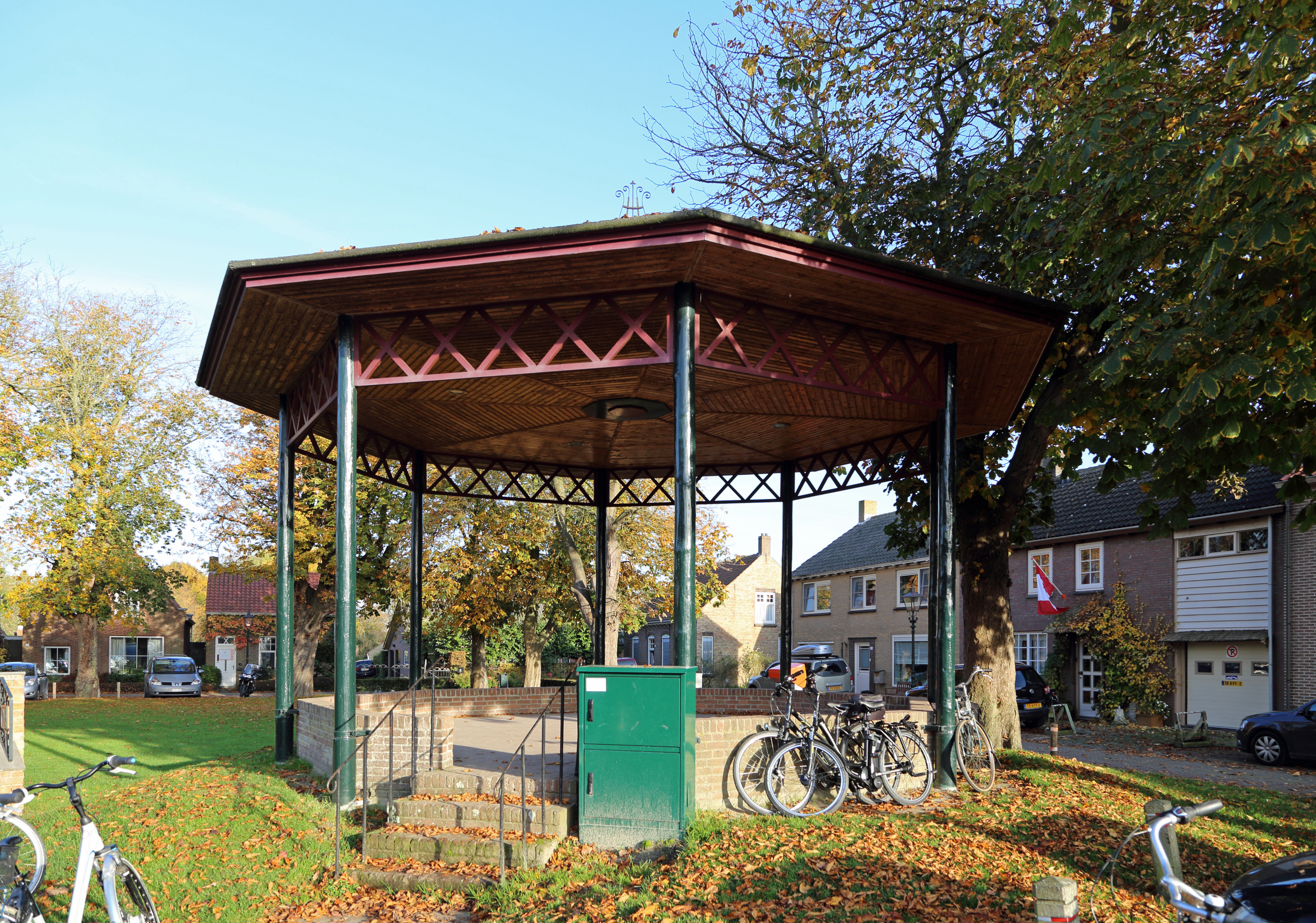
- Bandstand in Retranchement

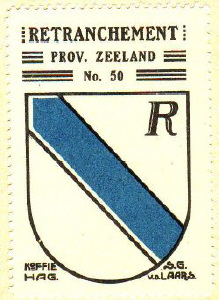
- Coat of arms

- Location in the province of Zeeland in the Netherlands Retranchement (Netherlands)
- Coordinates: 51°20′52″N 3°23′5″E
- Country: Netherlands
- Province: Zeeland
- Municipality: Sluis

Area
  - Total: 10.25 km^{2} (3.96 sq mi)
- Elevation: 2.4 m (7.9 ft)

Population (2021)
  - Total: 295
  - Density: 28.8/km^{2} (74.5/sq mi)
- Time zone: UTC+1 (CET)
  - Summer (DST): UTC+2 (CEST)
- Postal code: 4525
- Dialing code: 0117

Retranchement is a village in the Dutch province of Zeeland. It is located on the Belgian border, about 9 km (5 miles) northwest of Oostburg, in the municipality of Sluis.

== History ==
The village was first mentioned in 1627 as "Een groot en seer sterck Retrenchement" (a big and very strong retrenchement). Retrenchement is a type of sconce. The village is named after Retranchement Cadsandria which was built around 1622 to protect against the Spanish troops, and consists of a wall with bastions with a sconce on either side. The fortification was built by Maurice, Prince of Orange to control the Zwin and protect the recently conquered harbour of the Sluis. The fortification were enlarged in 1644, and a little settlement developed. The redoubt of Fort Nassau still exists.

The Dutch Reformed church is a small aisleless church with ridge turret which was built in 1630 as a garrison church. The exterior was restored in 1948, and the interior in 1955.

Construction of the nameless grist mill of Retranchement started on 24 July 1643. It was blown over in a storm in 1717, and rebuilt 70 metres (yards) from its original spot. It was damaged in 1944, but could still be operated. It was repaired in 1948. In 1963, it was no longer in service. It was restored in 1982/83 and 2002/2003, and operates on a voluntary basis.

Retranchement used to be an important border crossing, and there was an interchange station between the tram line from Breskens to Maldeghem and the Belgian tram line to Knokke. The tram lines closed in 1939 and 1948 respectively.

Retranchement was the scene of heavy fighting both in May 1940 and October to November 1944. Retranchement and Sluis were the last places liberated by the Canadian army during the Battle of the Scheldt, due to the strong fortifications of the village. 779 Canadians and 1,305 Germans died near Retranchement.

Retranchement was a separate municipality until 1970, when it was merged with Sluis.

== Gallery ==
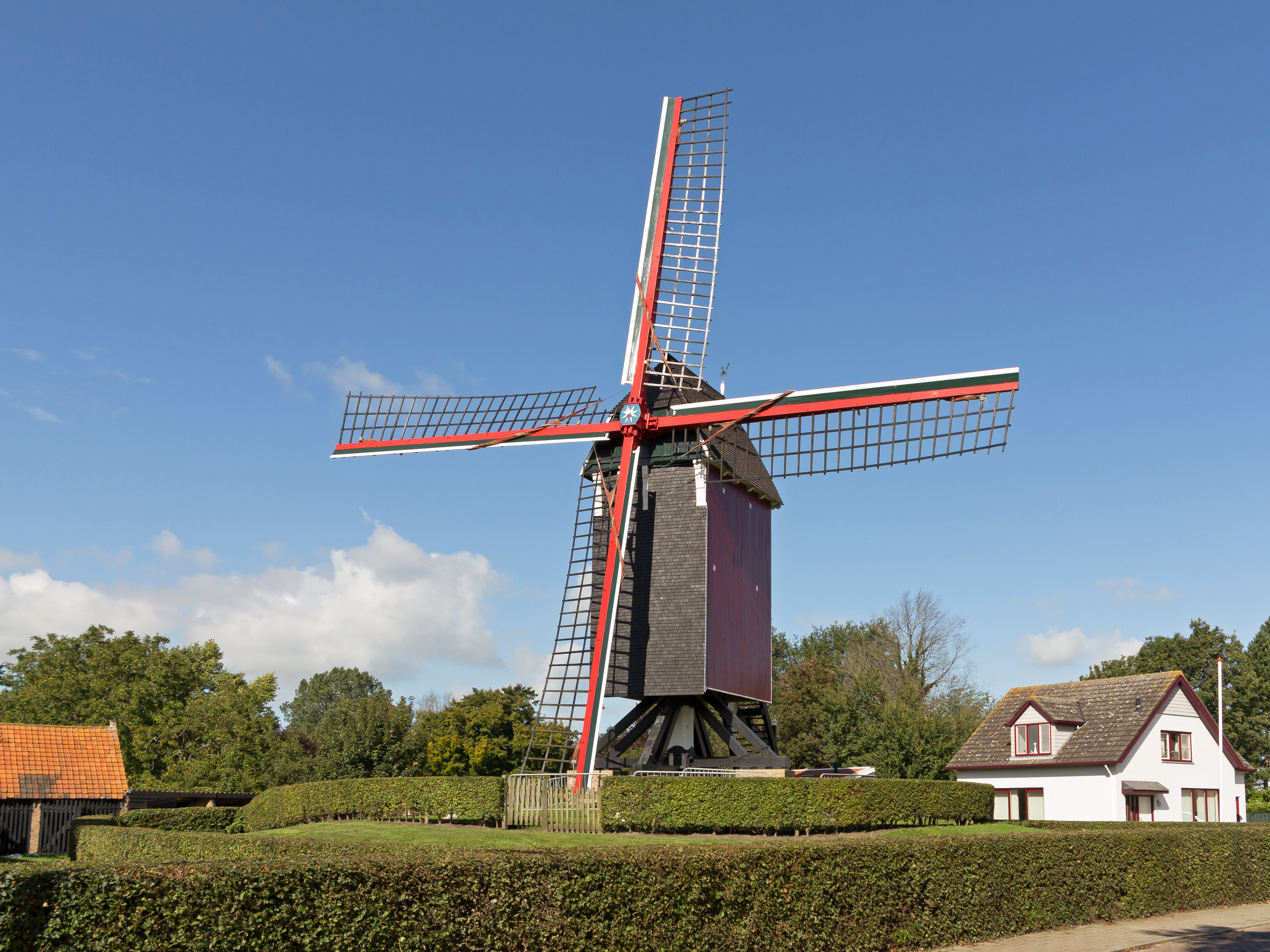
Windmill: de Retranchementse Molen

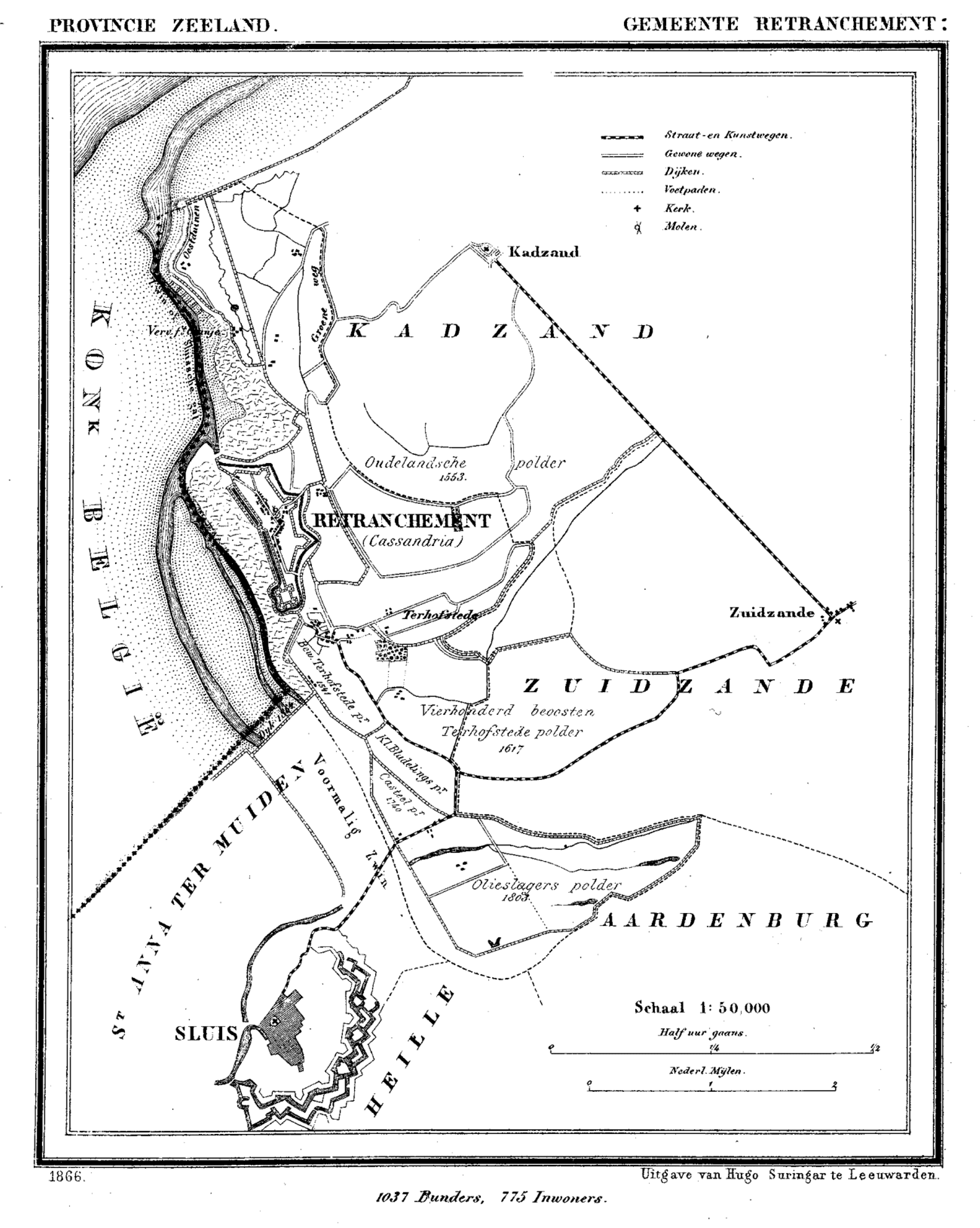
Map (1866)

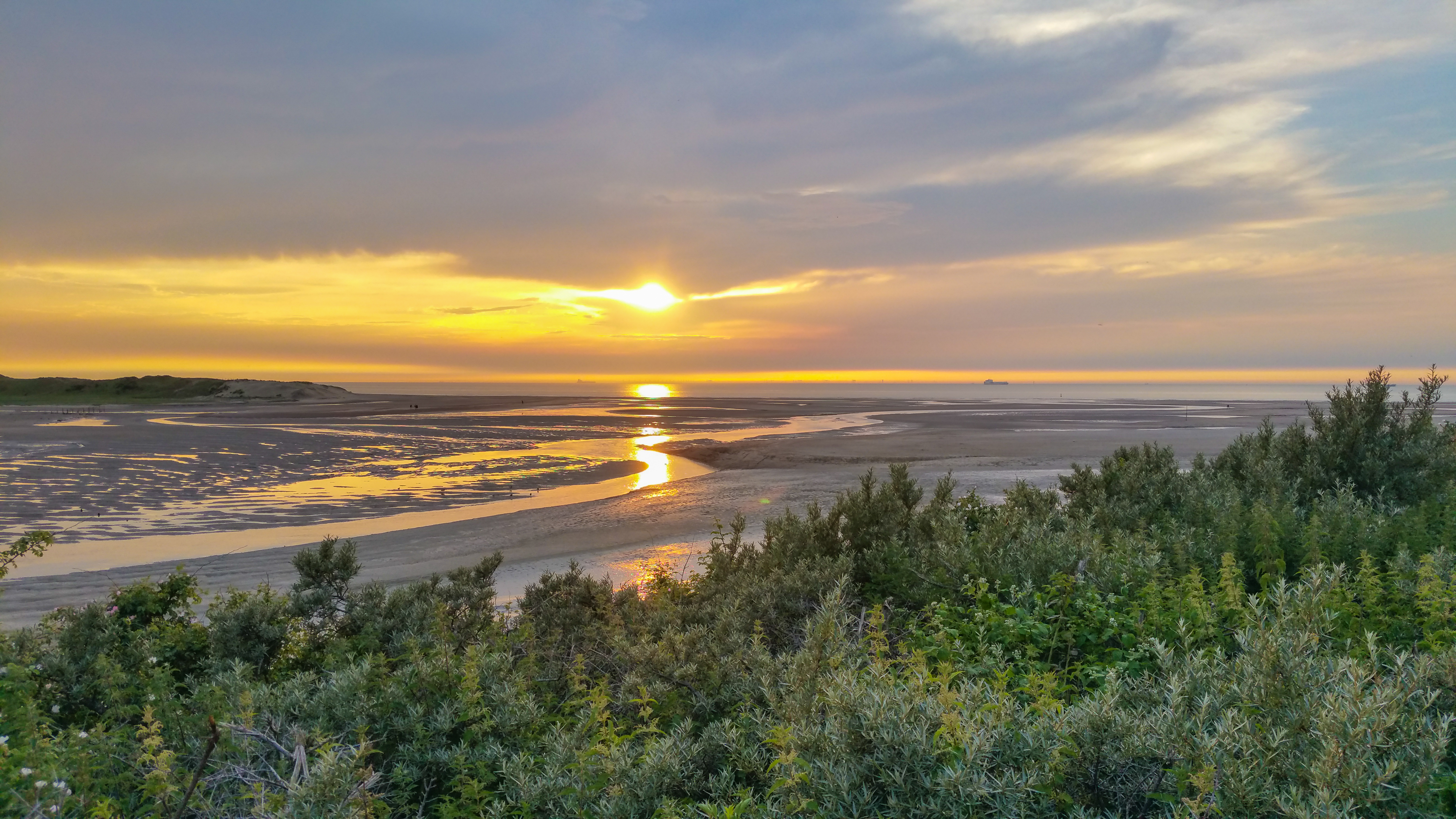
Sunset on the Zwin

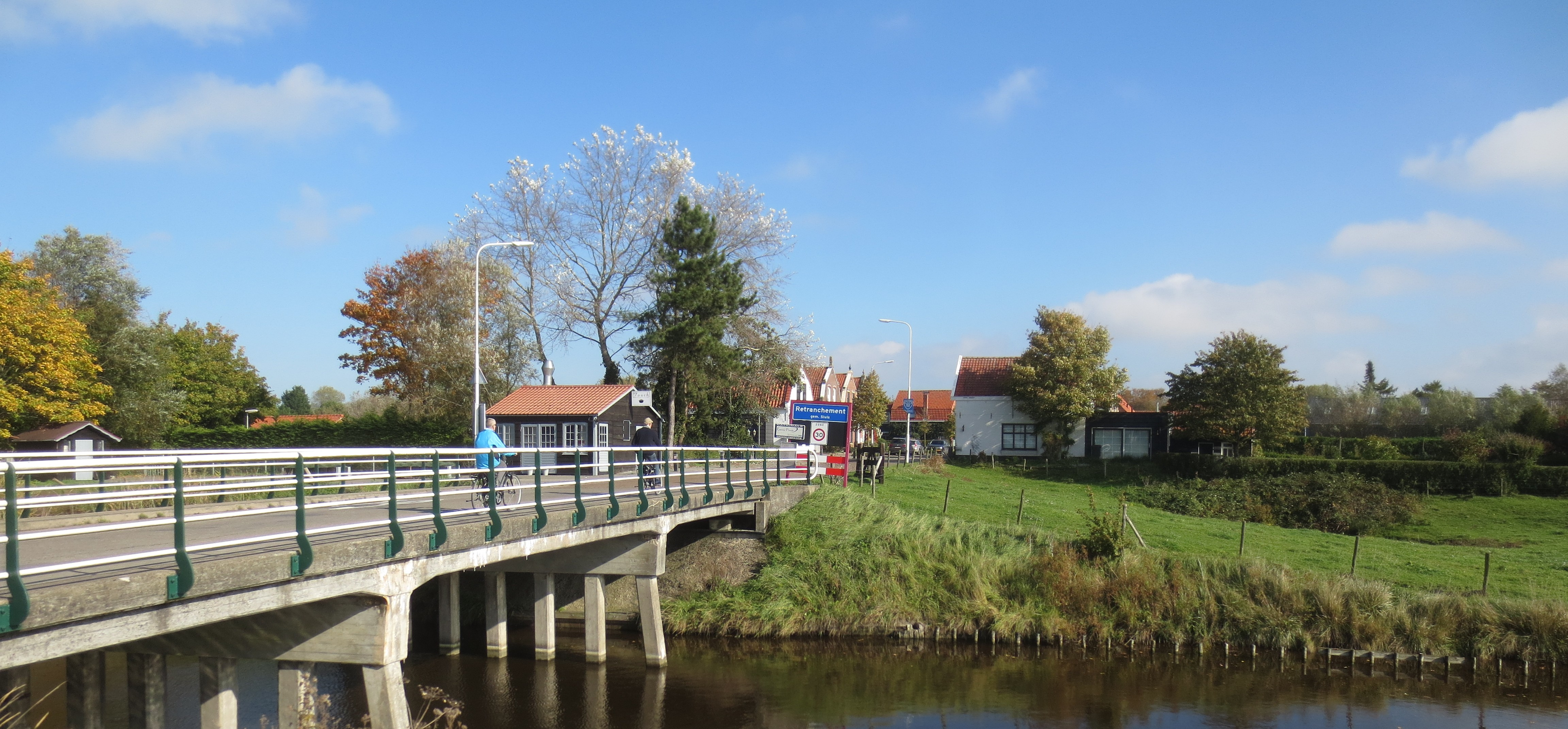
Village view
