= Sluis =

Sluis Sluus (Zeeuws)
- Municipality
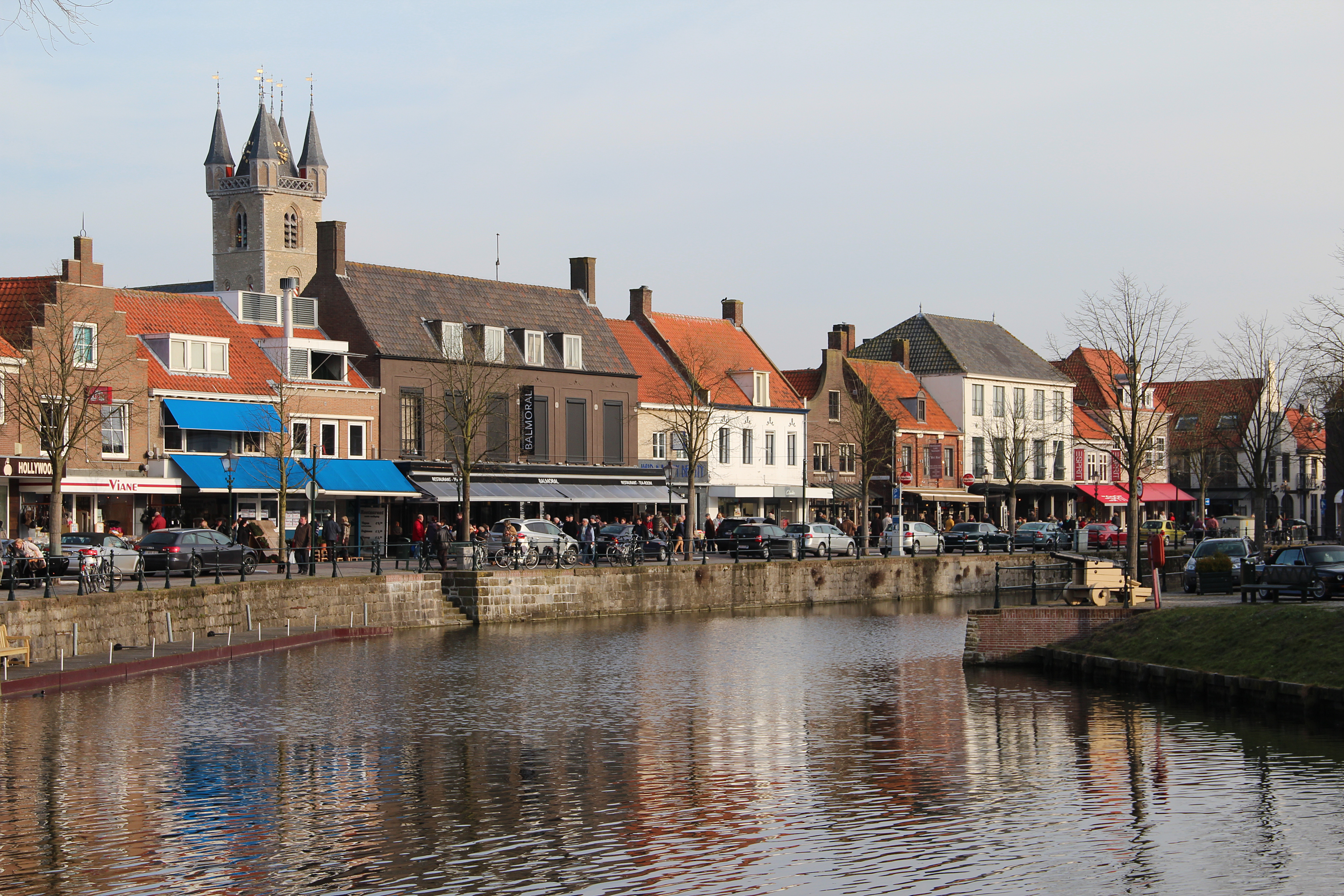
- Skyline of Sluis

- Flag Coat of arms

- Location in Zeeland
- Coordinates: 51°18′30″N 3°23′10″E
- Country: Netherlands
- Province: Zeeland

Government
  - Body: Municipal council
  - Mayor: Marga Vermue-Vermue (CDA)

Area
  - Total: 307.16 km^{2} (118.60 sq mi)
  - Land: 279.36 km^{2} (107.86 sq mi)
  - Water: 27.80 km^{2} (10.73 sq mi)
- Elevation: 2 m (6.6 ft)

Population (January 2021)
  - Total: 23,166
  - Density: 83/km^{2} (210/sq mi)
- Time zone: UTC+1 (CET)
  - Summer (DST): UTC+2 (CEST)
- Postcode: 4500–4519, 4524–4529
- Area code: 0117
- Website: www.gemeentesluis.nl

Sluis (Dutch: [slœys]; Zeelandic: Sluus [slys]; French: L’Écluse) is a city and municipality located in the west of Zeelandic Flanders, in the south-western Dutch province of Zeeland.

The current incarnation of the municipality has existed since 1 January 2003. The former municipalities of Oostburg and Sluis-Aardenburg merged on that date. The latter as formed in 1995 from a merger between the previous municipality of Sluis and the former municipality of Aardenburg.

== History ==
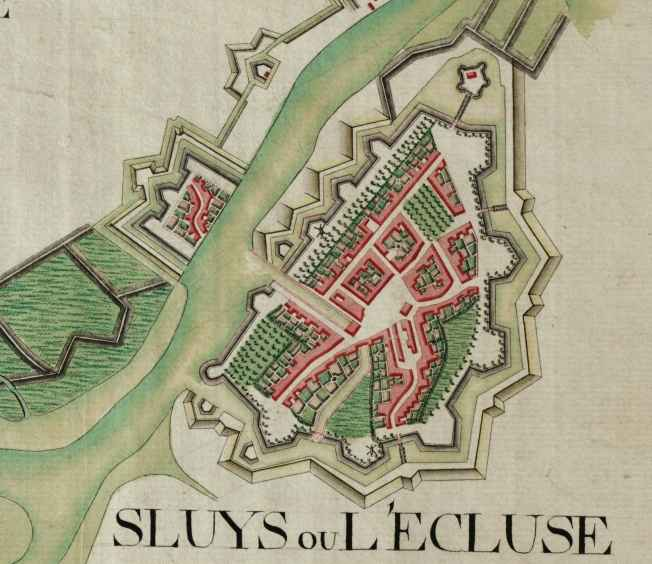
Sint Anna ter Muiden and Sluis on the Ferraris map (around 1775)

The town received city rights in 1290. In 1340 the Battle of Sluys was fought nearby at sea during the Hundred Years' War. There is a record of one of the first lotteries with money on 9 May 1455 of 1737 florins (US$170,000, in 2014).

During the Eighty Years' War in 1587 the town was captured by Spanish troops under the Duke of Parma and was retaken in 1604 by a Dutch and English force under Maurice of Nassau.

From 2006 until its closure in 2013, Oud Sluis was one of only two Michelin three-starred restaurants in the entire country.

== Geography ==
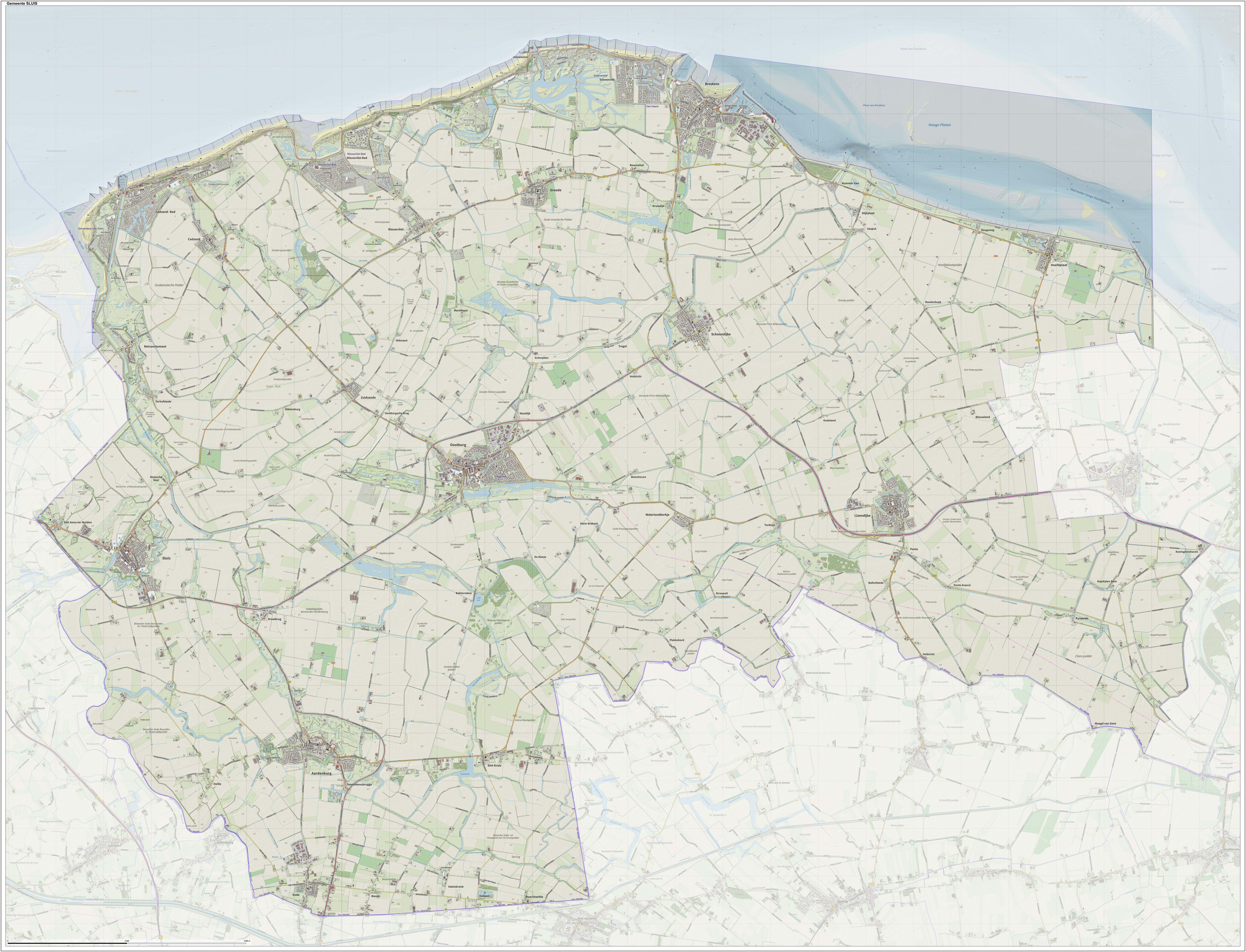
Dutch Topographic map of Sluis, June 2015

In addition to the town of Sluis itself, the municipality is made up of the following population centres:

- Aardenburg
- Breskens
- Cadzand
- Draaibrug
- Eede
- Groede
- Heille
- Hoofdplaat
- IJzendijke
- Nieuwvliet
- Oostburg
- Retranchement
- Schoondijke
- Sint Anna ter Muiden
- Sint Kruis
- Terhofstede
- Waterlandkerkje
- Zuidzande
- Zwindorp

Sint Anna ter Muiden, with a population of only 50 (2001), is a small village about 1 km west of the town of Sluis, located on the westernmost point of the Netherlands.

== Demography ==
The population of the municipality is 23,098 as of 2025.

Historical population (1996–2025)
Year	Number of inhabitants	% difference
1996	24,258	–0.18%
1997	24,326	+0.28%
1998	24,331	+0.02%
1999	24,209	−0.50%
2000	24,253	+0.18%
2001	24,594	+1.41%
2002	24,755	+0.65%
2003	24,828	+0.29%
2004	24,596	−0.93%
2005	24,605	+0.04%
2006	24,357	−1.01%
2007	24,325	−0.13%
2008	24,238	−0.36%
2009	24,156	−0.34%
2010	24,089	−0.28%
2011	23,979	−0.46%
2012	23,892	−0.36%
2013	23,886	−0.03%
2014	23,820	−0.28%
2015	23,747	−0.31%
2016	23,639	−0.45%
2017	23,658	+0.08%
2018	23,526	−0.56%
2019	23,386	−0.60%
2020	23,210	−0.75%
2021	23,166	−0.19%
2022	23,141	−0.11%
2023	23,243	+0.44%
2024	23,150	−0.40%
2025	23,098	−0.22%

== Transport ==
A ferry connection across the Westerschelde exists between Breskens and Vlissingen. After the opening of the Westerschelde tunnel near Terneuzen in 2003, the ferry now carries only pedestrian and bicycle traffic.

== Notable people ==
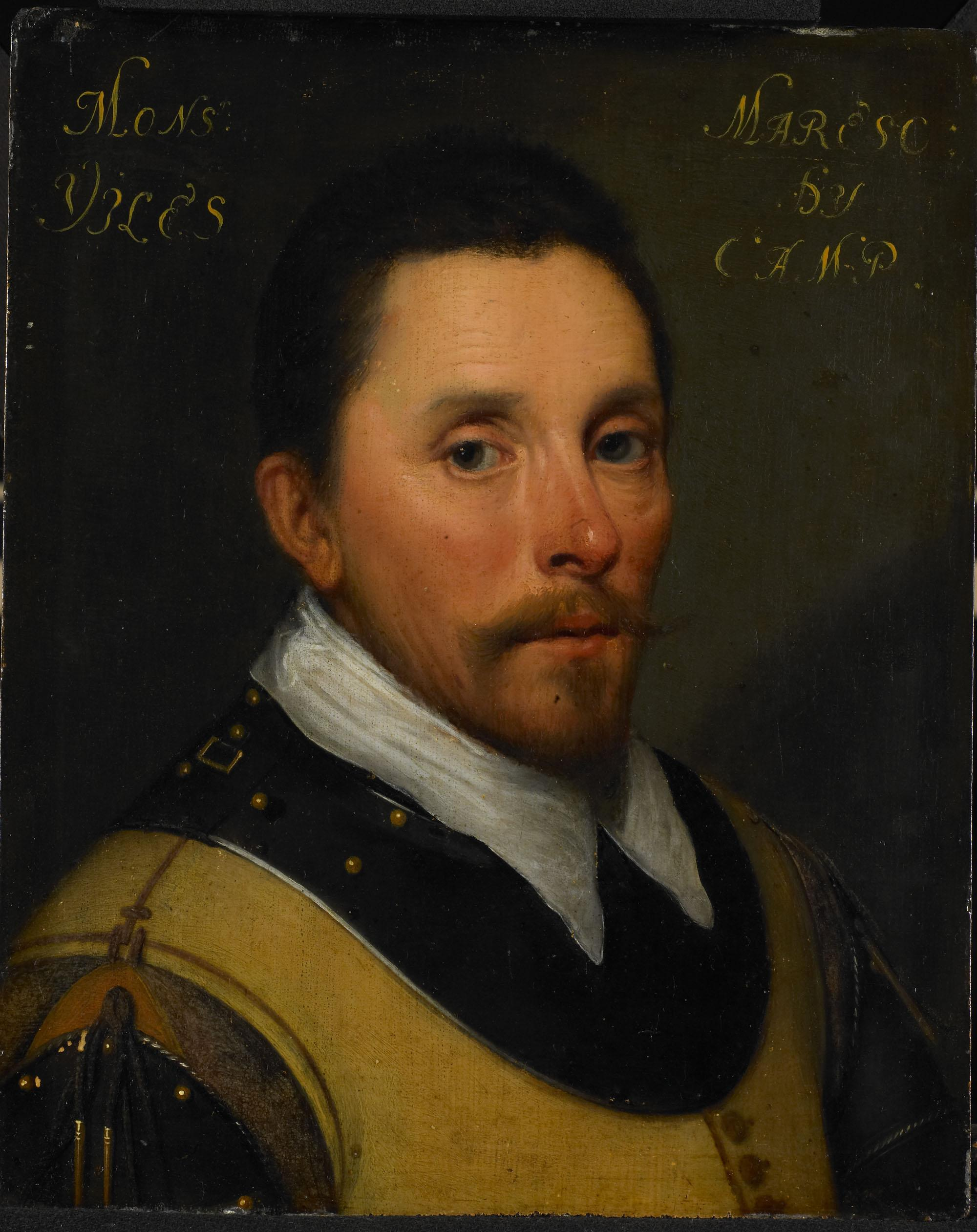
Joost de Soete

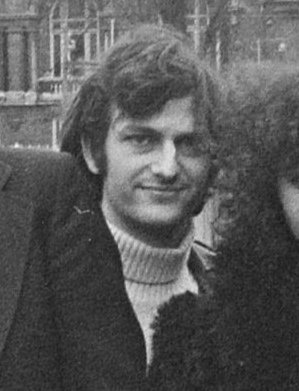
Ate de Jong, 1976

- John Crabbe (before 1305 in Muide – 1352)l a Flemish merchant, pirate and soldier
- Joost de Soete (ca.1510/1520 in Sluis – 1589), a Dutch nobleman and Field Marshal
- Jacob van Loo (1614 in Sluis – 1670), a painter of the Dutch Golden Age
- Joan Blasius (1639 in Cadzand — 1672), a Dutch poet, playwright, translator and lawyer
- Johanna Jacoba van Beaumont (ca.1752 in Sluis - 1827), a politically active journalist, feminist and editor
- Johan Hendrik van Dale (1828 in Sluis - 1872), a Dutch teacher, archivist and lexicographer
- Ernst Oppler (1867–1929), German impressionist painter, lived for some years in Sluis
- Hermine Moquette (1869-1971), Dutch archivist, born in Sluis
- Jan Eekhout (1900 in Sluis - 1978), a Dutch writer, poet, translator and Nazi
- Herman Wijffels (born 1942 in Turkeye), a retired Dutch politician and businessman
- Hans Wijers (born 1951 in Oostburg), a retired Dutch politician and businessman
- Ate de Jong (born 1953 in Aardenburg), a Dutch film director

=== Sport ===
- Willem van Hanegem (born 1944 in Breskens), a Dutch former football midfielder with over 50 caps and 600 appearances in the top flight of association football
- Annabel Kosten (born 1977 in Oostburg), a retired freestyle swimmer, bronze medallist at the 2004 Summer Olympics

== Gallery ==
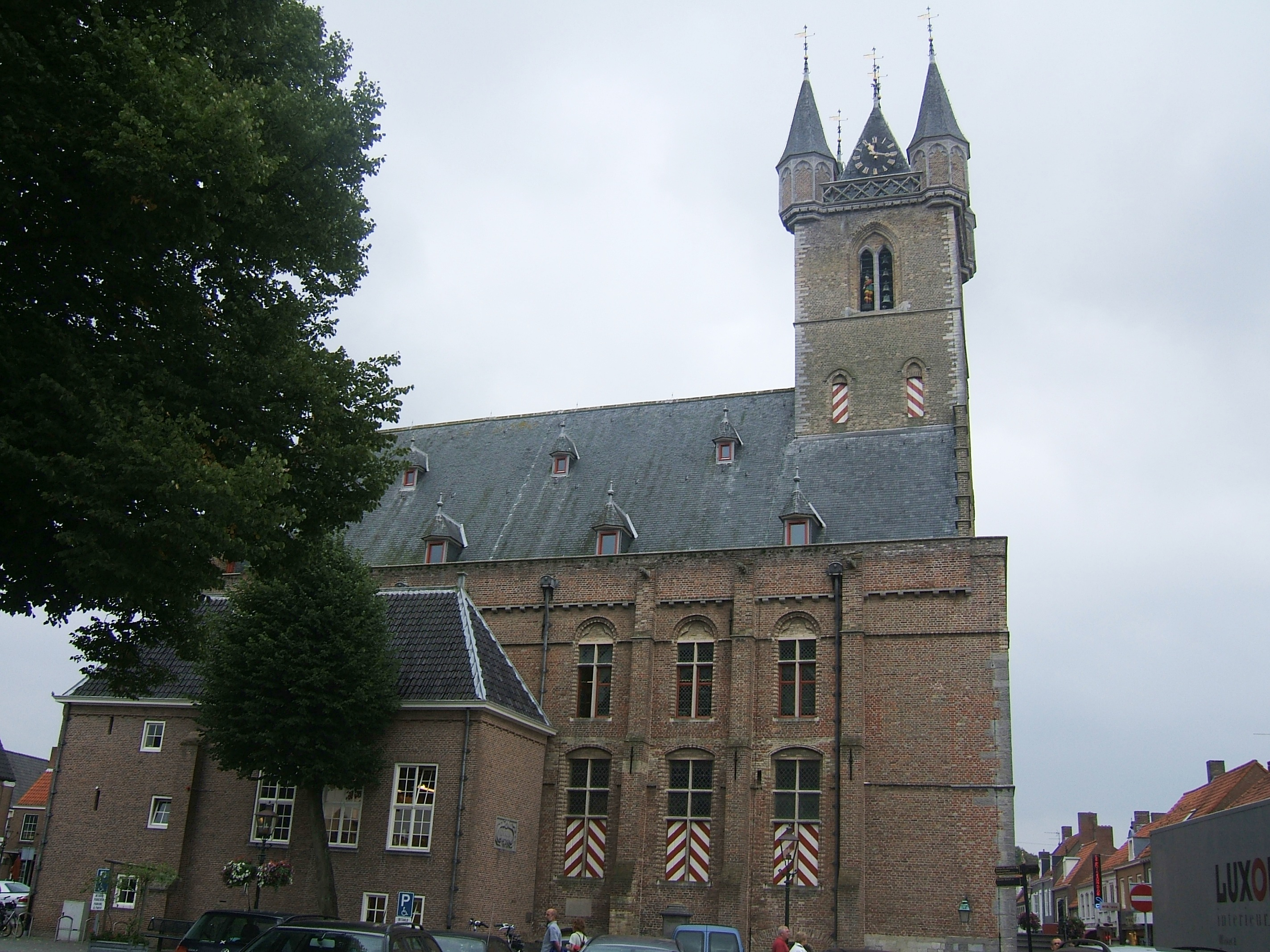
The town hall and the Belfort in Sluis

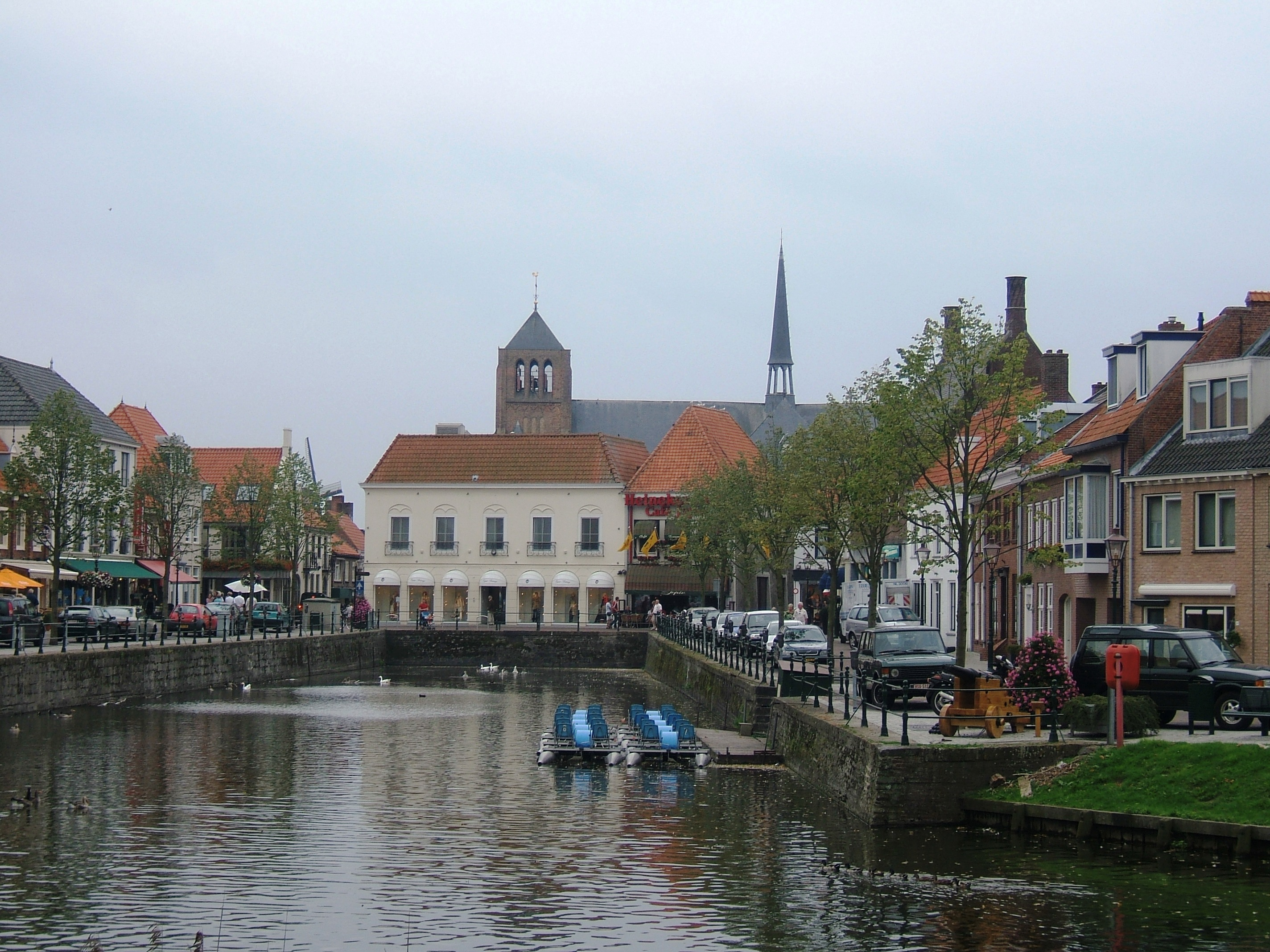
The channel and the catholic church in Sluis

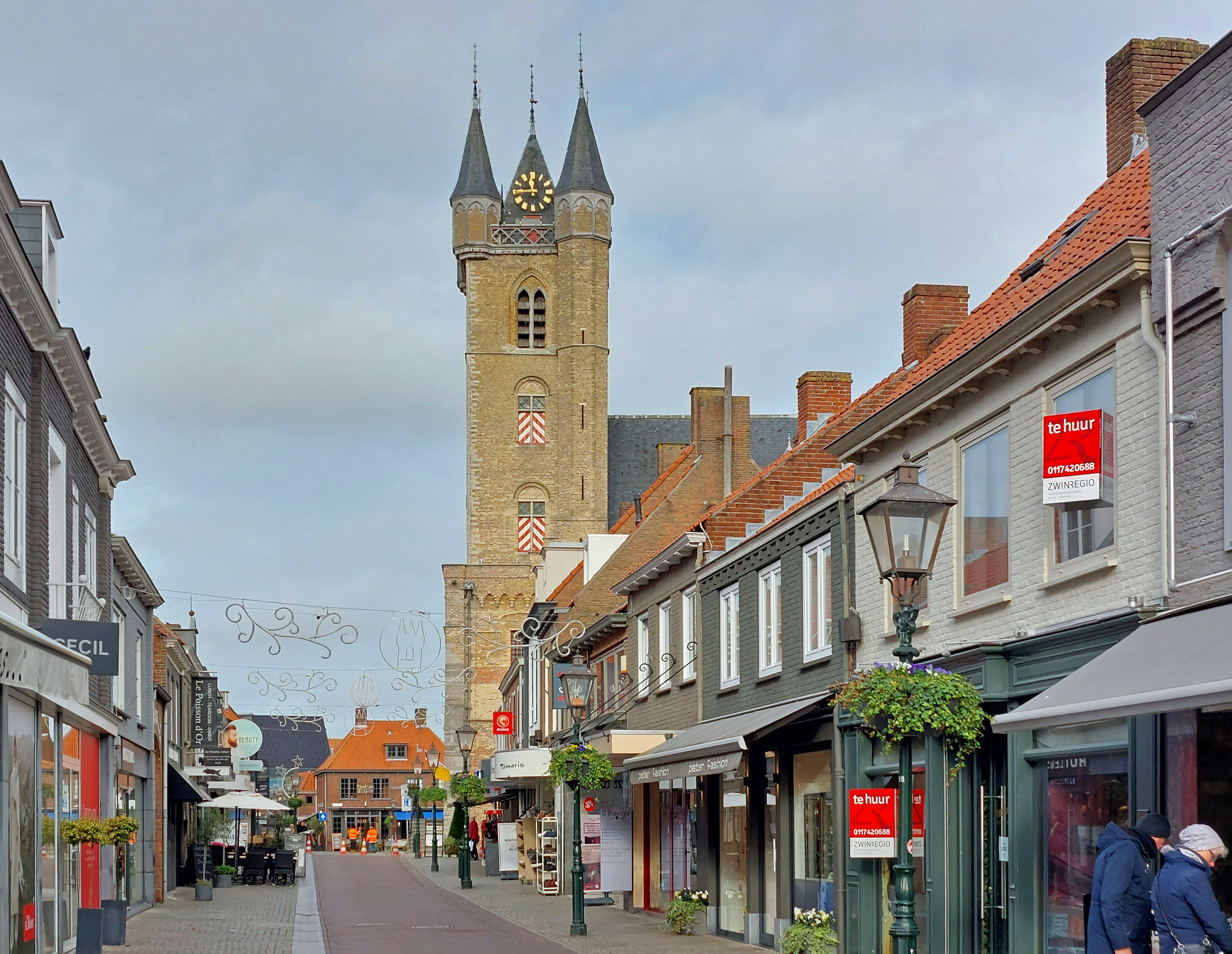
The Kapellestraat, one of the two main streets in Sluis

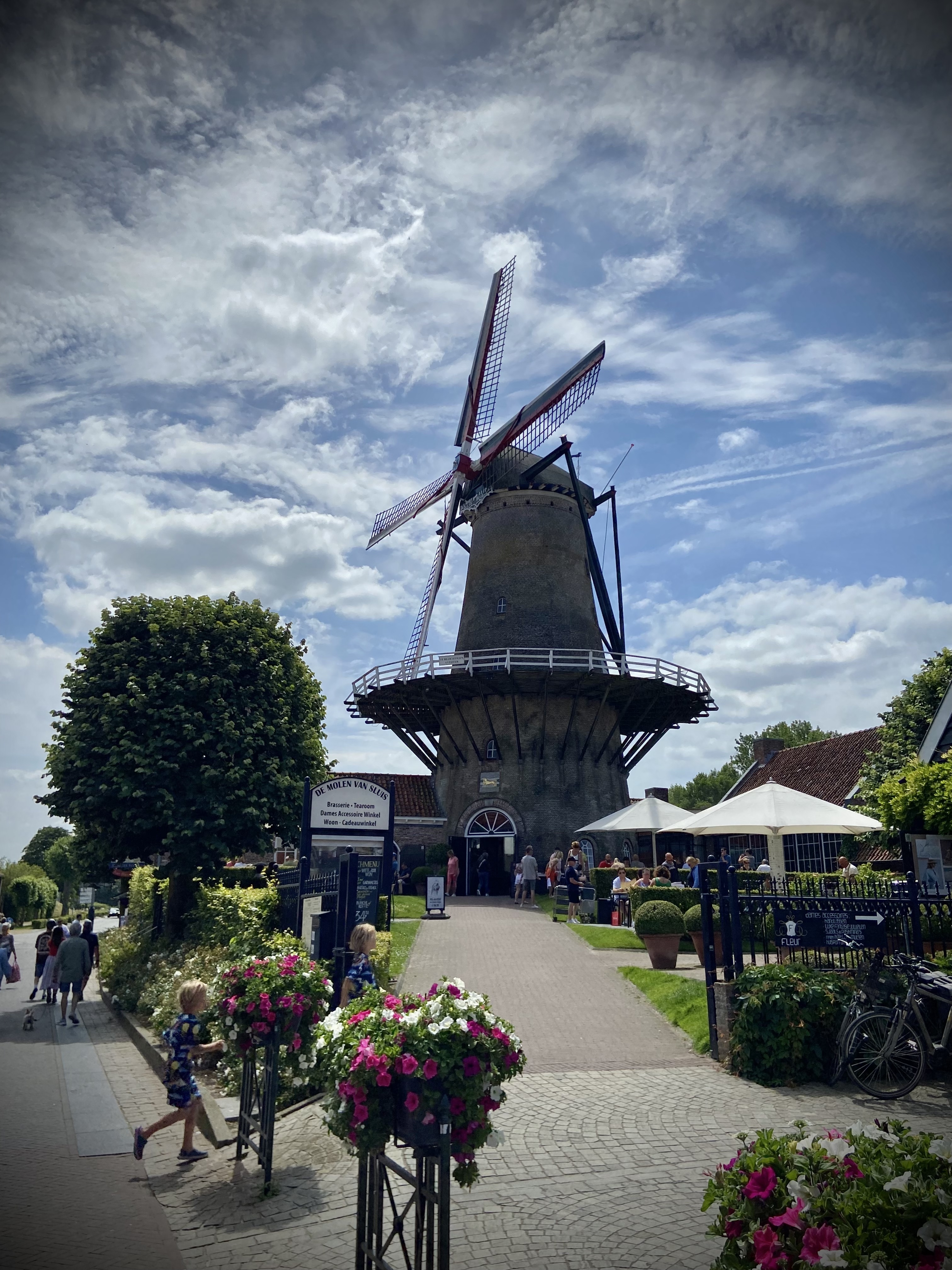
Molen De Brak windmill in Sluis, built 1739. Served as a defensive structure and was the first stone mill in Sluis.

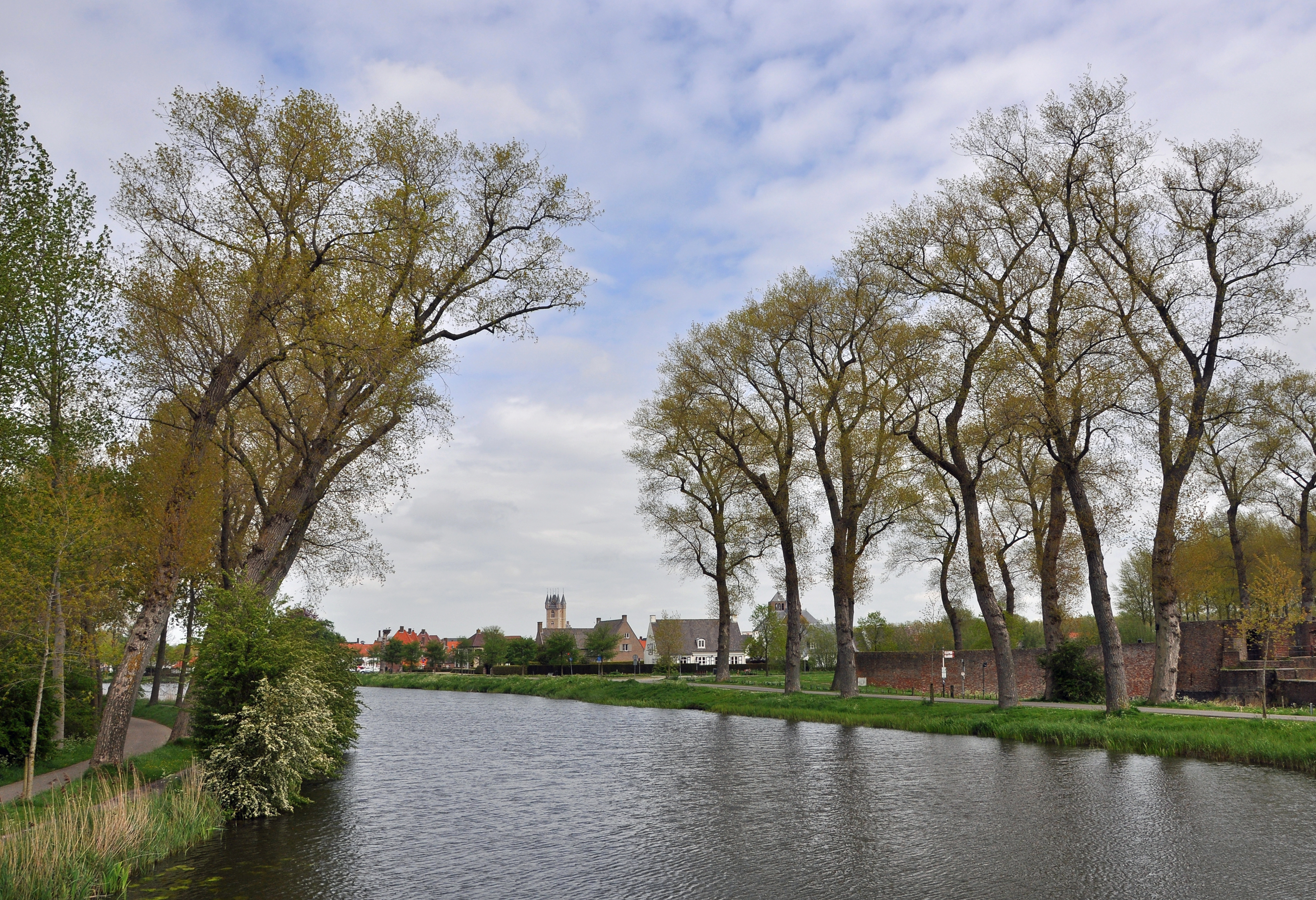
Sluis seen from the Damme canal

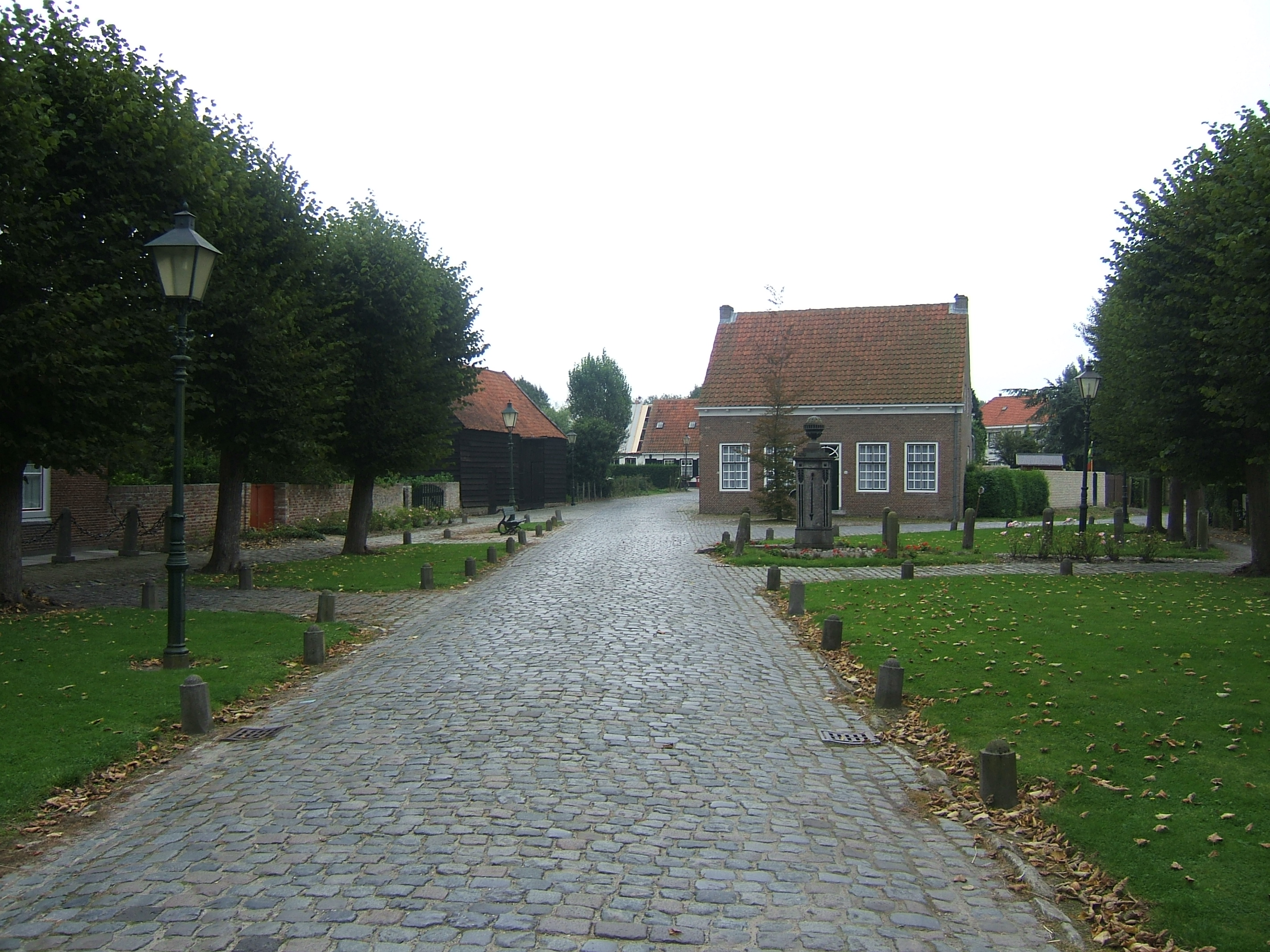
A street of the village Sint Anna ter Muiden

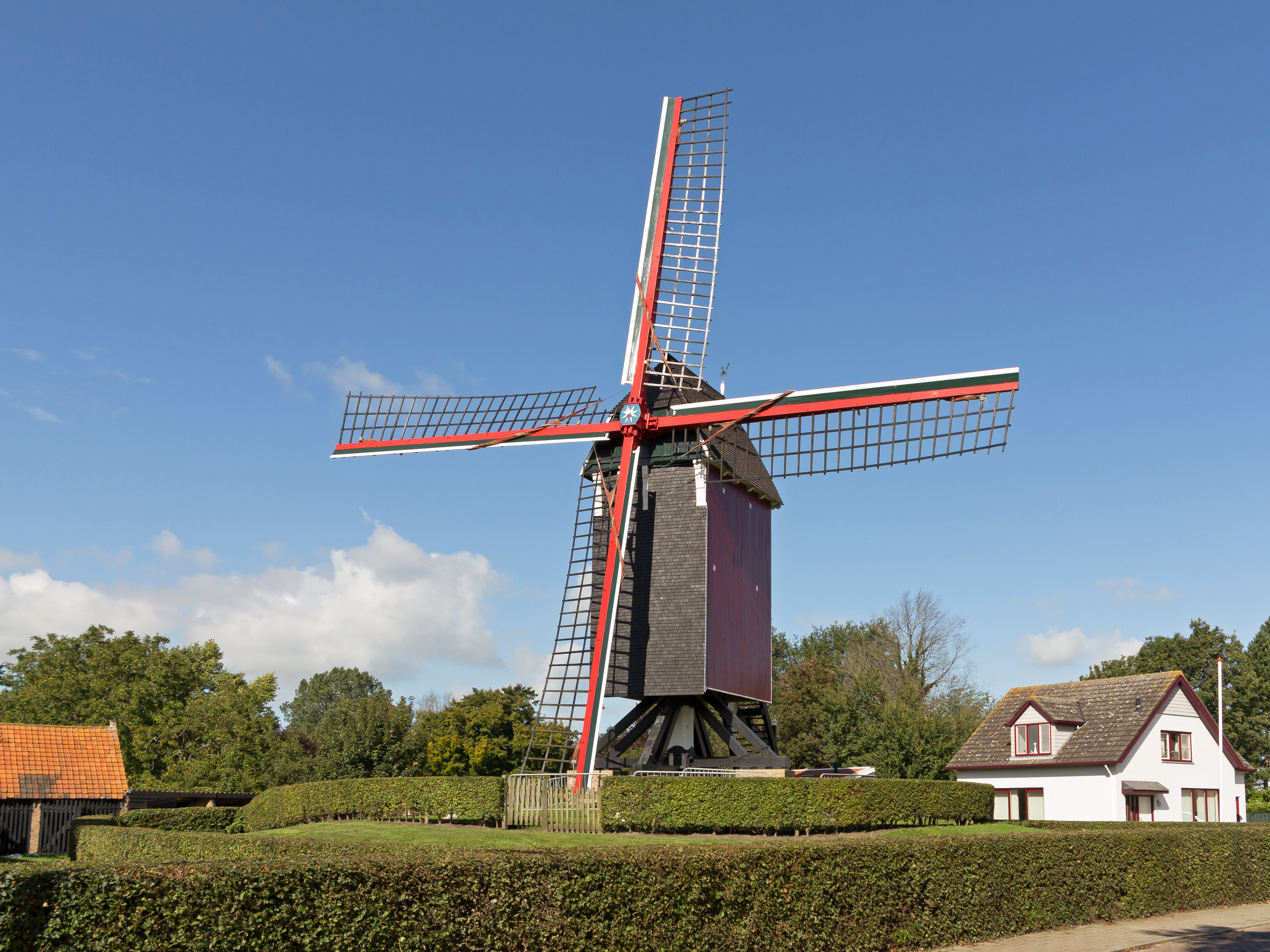
Retranchement, windmill 'de Retranchementse Molen'

== See also ==
- Zwin – Nature reserve
- Battle of Sluys
- Van der Sluijs – Surname of Dutch origin
- History of the Netherlands
