= Joost de Soete =

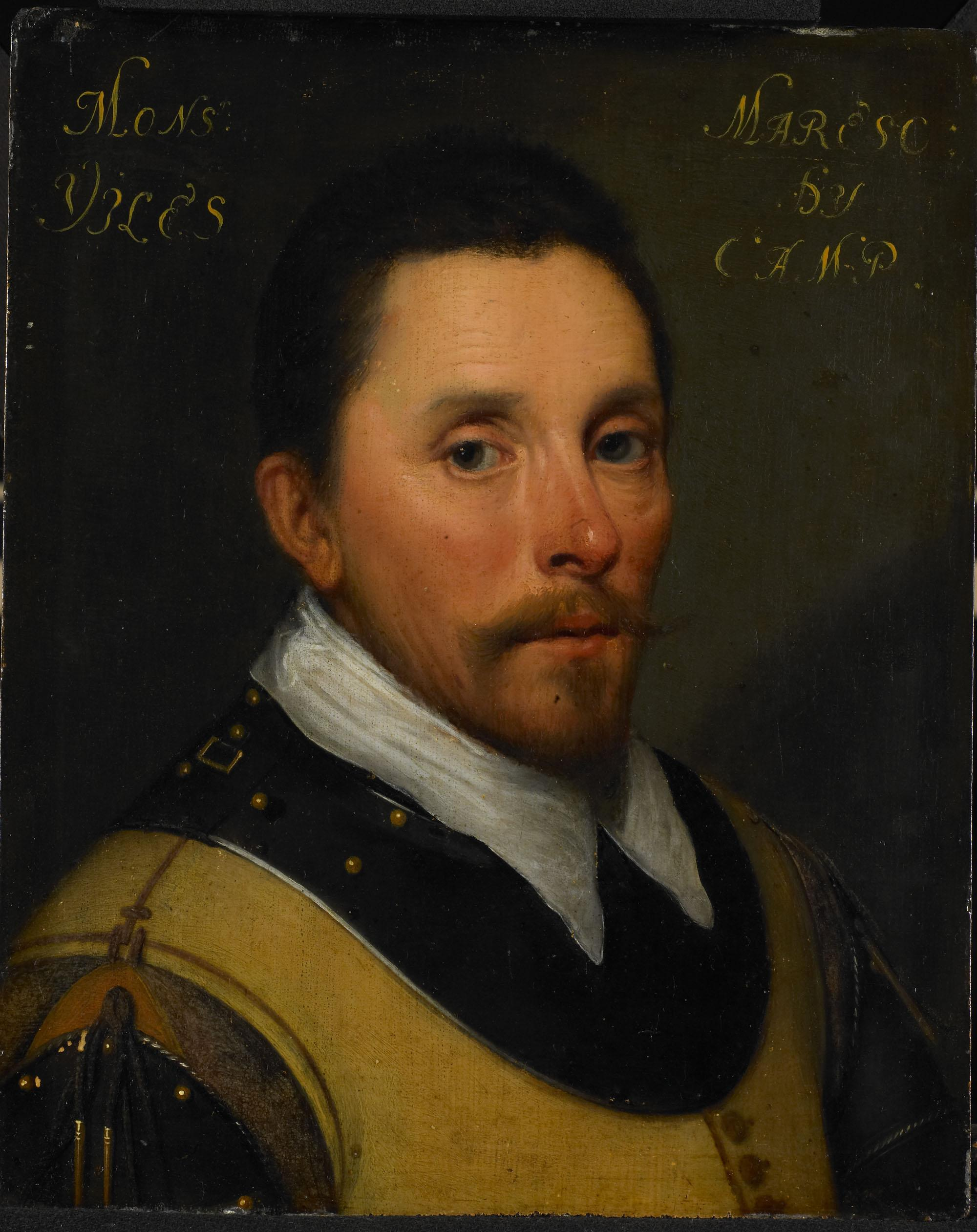
- Military career
- Allegiance: Dutch Geuzen
- Rank: Field marshal
- Commands: Commander of Bouchout

Joost de Soete or de Zoete, Lord of Villers or Villiers, (1510–1520, Sluis – March 1589, The Hague) was a Dutch nobleman and Field Marshal who fought in the early years of the Eighty Years' War.

De Soete was the third son Alexander de Zoete, knight and governor of Zeeland, and Johanna van Ranst, lady of Hautin, who had married in 1502.

In 1580, he was Commander of Bouchout. In March 1589 he was mortally wounded at the battle at Geertruidenberg. He was brought to The Hague where he soon died.

His coat of arms were a black twill with silver chevron.
