= Zuidzande =

- Village
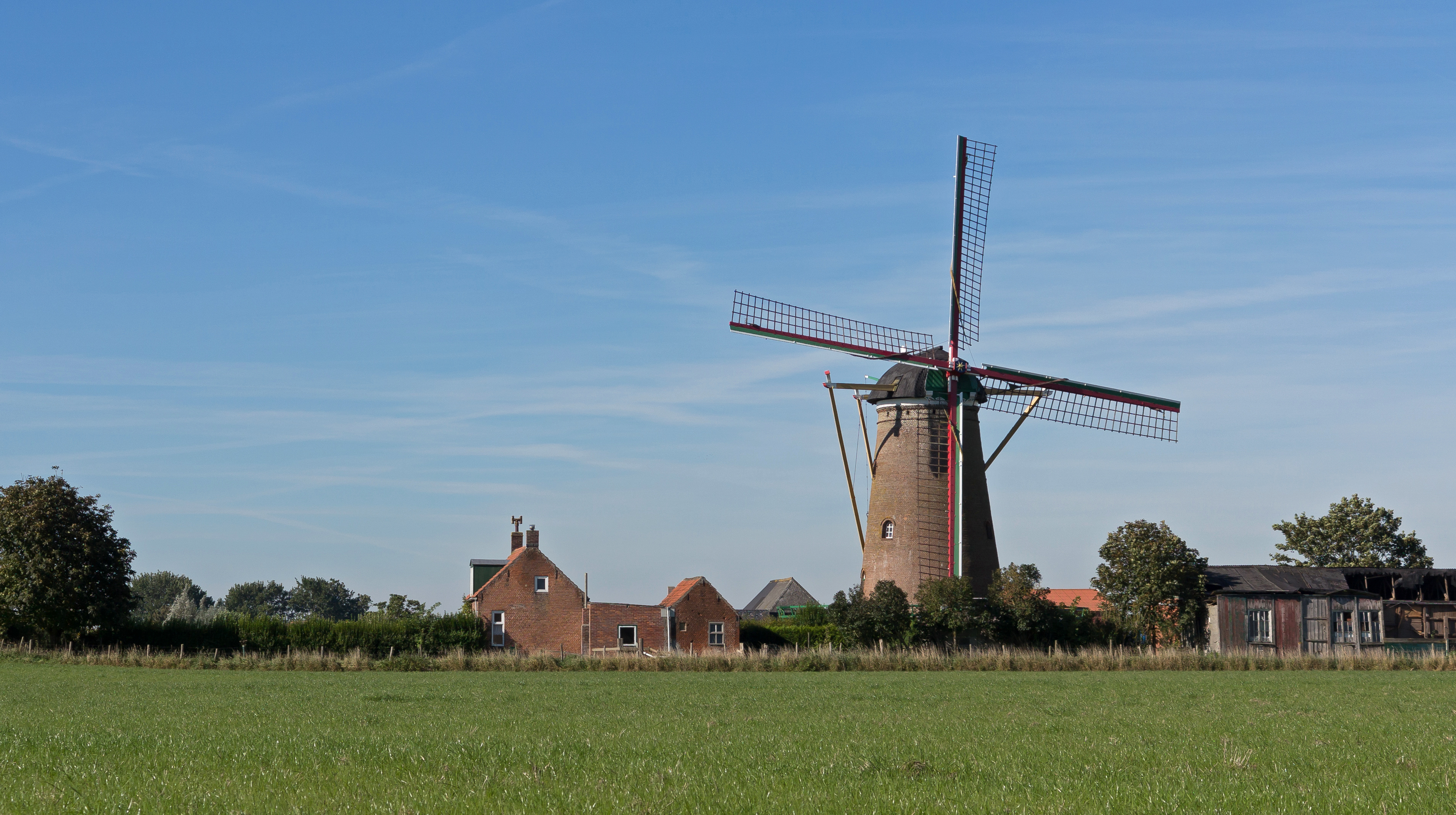
- Wind mill Zuidzandese molen

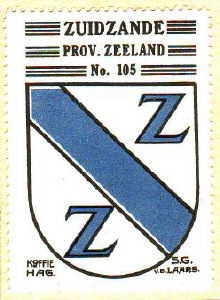
- Coat of arms

- Location in the province of Zeeland in the Netherlands Zuidzande (Netherlands)
- Coordinates: 51°20′28″N 3°27′7″E
- Country: Netherlands
- Province: Zeeland
- Municipality: Sluis

Area
  - Total: 14.12 km^{2} (5.45 sq mi)
- Elevation: 1.6 m (5.2 ft)

Population (2021)
  - Total: 505
  - Density: 35.8/km^{2} (92.6/sq mi)
- Time zone: UTC+1 (CET)
  - Summer (DST): UTC+2 (CEST)
- Postal code: 4505
- Dialing code: 0117

Zuidzande is a village in the Dutch province of Zeeland. It is located in the municipality of Sluis.

== History ==
The village was first mentioned in 1290 as "insula de Zuitzant", and means "south sand (bank)" and refers to the former island. Zuid (south) has been added to distinguish between Cadzand.

The Dutch Reformed church was destroyed in 1944 during the Battle of the Scheldt. It was rebuilt in 1952, but decommissioned in 1996, and nowadays contains a restaurant. The nameless grist mill was built in 1874. In 1968, it was damaged during a storm. It was restored between 1980 and 1981, and again in 2019 and 2020. The wind mill is used on a voluntary basis.

Zuidzande was home to 997 people in 1840. Zuidzande was a separate municipality until 1970, when it was merged with Oostburg. In 2003, it became part of the municipality of Sluis.
