= Eede =

- Village
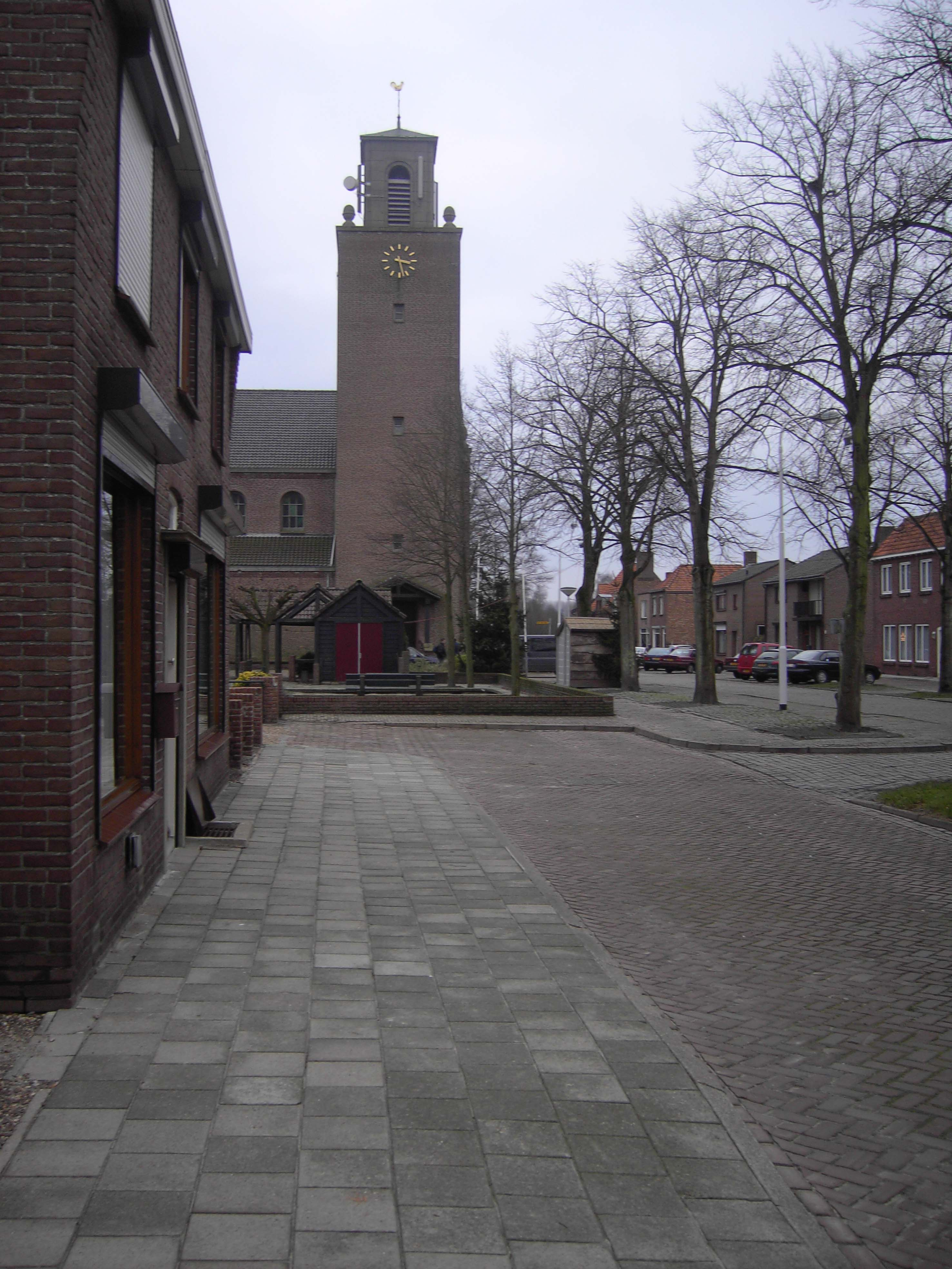
- Church of Eede

- Flag

- Location in the province of Zeeland in the Netherlands Eede (Netherlands)
- Coordinates: 51°14′48″N 3°26′37″E
- Country: Netherlands
- Province: Zeeland
- Municipality: Sluis

Area
  - Total: 8.25 km^{2} (3.19 sq mi)
- Elevation: 1.5 m (4.9 ft)

Population (2021)
  - Total: 895
  - Density: 108/km^{2} (281/sq mi)
- Time zone: UTC+1 (CET)
  - Summer (DST): UTC+2 (CEST)
- Postal code: 4529
- Dialing code: 0117

Eede is a village in the Dutch province of Zeeland. It is located close on the Belgian border about 3 km south of Aardenburg, in the municipality of Sluis.

Eede is the closest Dutch village to France as the crow flies, only 54 km to Halluin in the French department of Nord.

== History ==
The village was first mentioned in 1279 "con apelle Ee", and refers to a former river. The river was dammed in 1813, and it silted after the Leopold Canal was built.

Shortly after 1651, a church was built, however it was destroyed by the French in 1672. It was sold to the Catholics in 1815. In 1912, the church burnt down. The church was damaged in May 1940, restored and completely destroyed on 12 September 1944. In 1951, the Assumption of Mary Church was built.

On 13 March 1945, Wilhelmina of the Netherlands returned to the Netherlands via Eede. The village had been conquered by the Canadians, but was largely in ruins. On 3 March 1954, a monument was revealed to mark the return of the queen. It is a statue of the Dutch Maiden. In 1984, a Canadian monument with armed vehicle were added to the war memorial.

Eede was home to 1,233 people in 1840. It was a separate municipality. In 1941, it became part of the municipality of Aardenburg. In 2003, it became part of the municipality of Sluis.

== Gallery ==
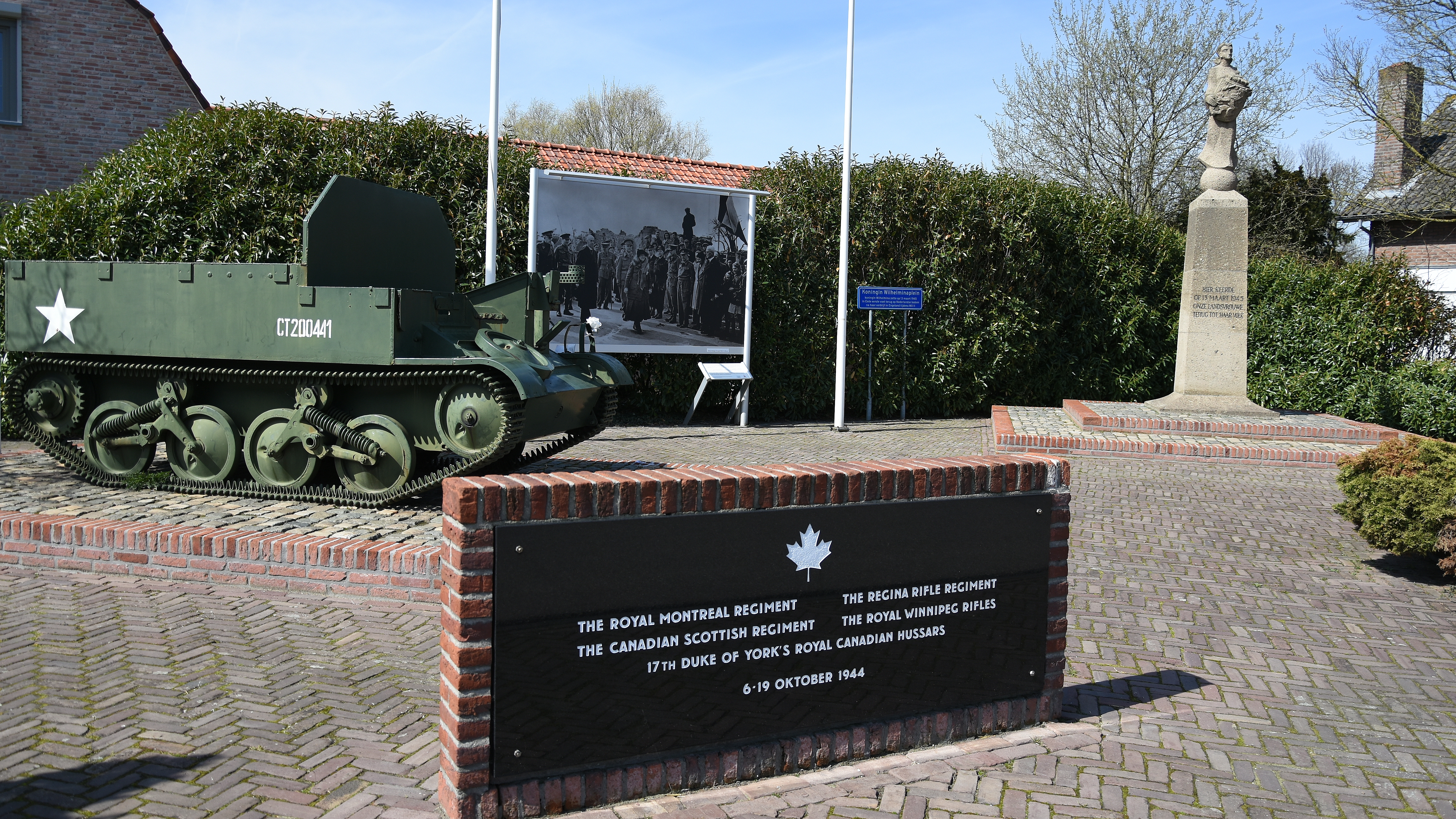
World War II memorial

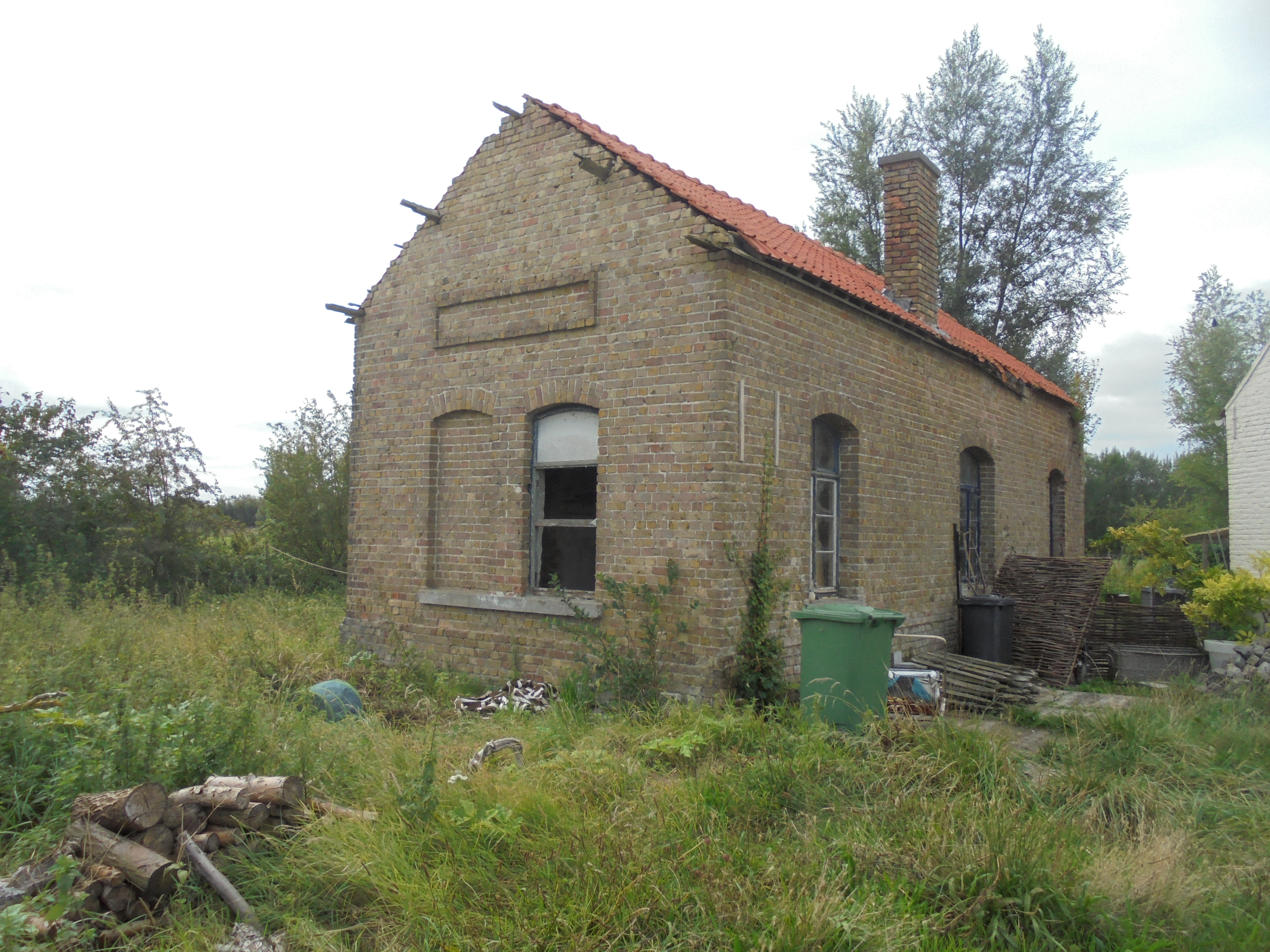
Former tram station
