= Sint Kruis =

- Village
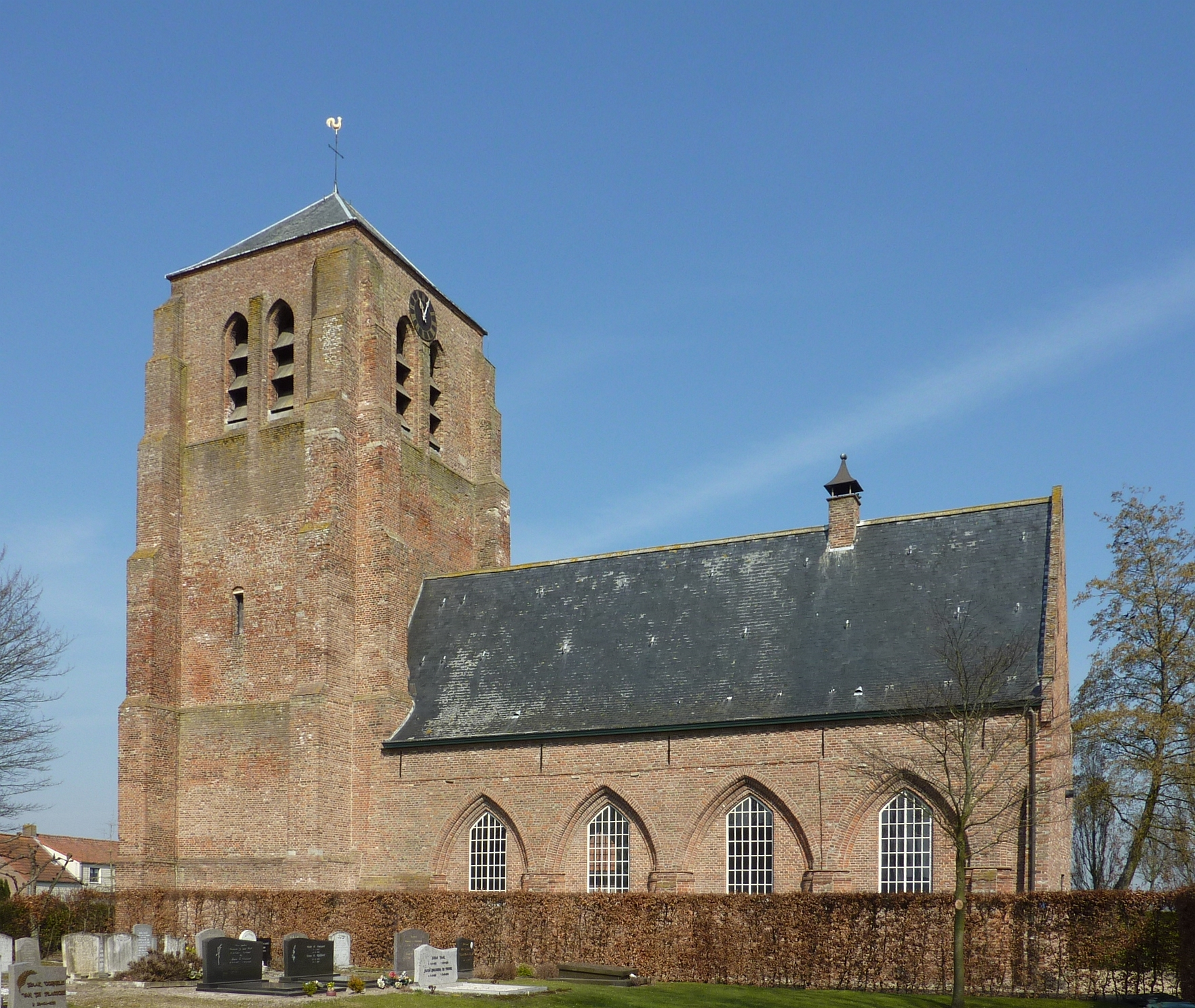
- Dutch Reformed church

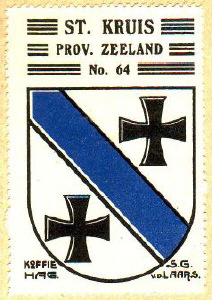
- Coat of arms

- Location in the province of Zeeland in the Netherlands Sint Kruis (Netherlands)
- Coordinates: 51°16′23″N 3°29′59″E
- Country: Netherlands
- Province: Zeeland
- Municipality: Sluis

Area
  - Total: 9.68 km^{2} (3.74 sq mi)
- Elevation: 2.1 m (6.9 ft)

Population (2021)
  - Total: 215
  - Density: 22.2/km^{2} (57.5/sq mi)
- Time zone: UTC+1 (CET)
  - Summer (DST): UTC+2 (CEST)
- Postal code: 4528
- Dialing code: 0117

Sint Kruis is a village in the Dutch province of Zeeland. It is located about 4 km east of Aardenburg, in the municipality of Sluis.

The village was first mentioned in 1270 as "jndie prochia van sint crues", and refers to the Holy Cross parish of the Saint Bavo's Abbey in Ghent.

The Dutch Reformed church is a three-aisled church which probably dates from the 14th century. The area around Sint Kruis was inundated in 1584 to thwart the progress of the Spanish Army. The land was drained in 1651, and the church was restored in 1652. In 1944, it was damaged by war, and restored between 1948 and 1949.

Sint Kruis was home to 613 people in 1840. It was a separate municipality until 1941, when it was merged with Aardenburg. In 2003, it became part of the municipality of Sluis.
