= Heille =

- Hamlet
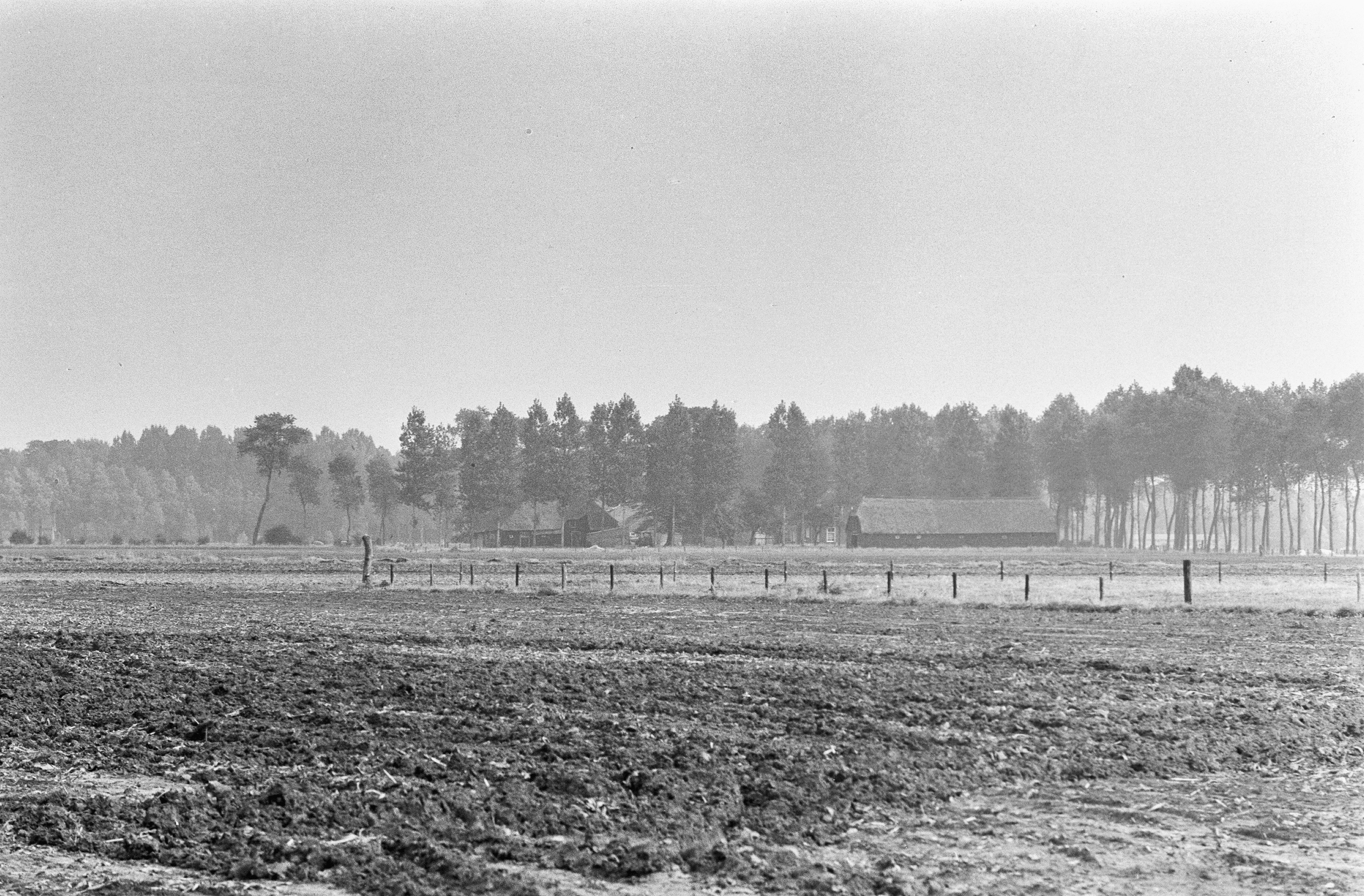

- Flag Coat of arms

- Location in the province of Zeeland in the Netherlands Heille (Netherlands)
- Coordinates: 51.2657°N 3.4133°E
- Country: Netherlands
- Province: Zeeland
- Municipality: Sluis
- Time zone: UTC+1 (CET)
  - Summer (DST): UTC+2 (CEST)
- Postal code: 4524
- Dialing code: 0117

Heille is a hamlet in the Dutch province of Zeeland. It is located on the Belgium border, about 2 km west of Aardenburg in the municipality of Sluis.

Heille is not a statistical entity, and the postal authorities have placed it under Sluis.

Heille was a separate municipality until 1880.
