= Sint Anna ter Muiden =

- Small city
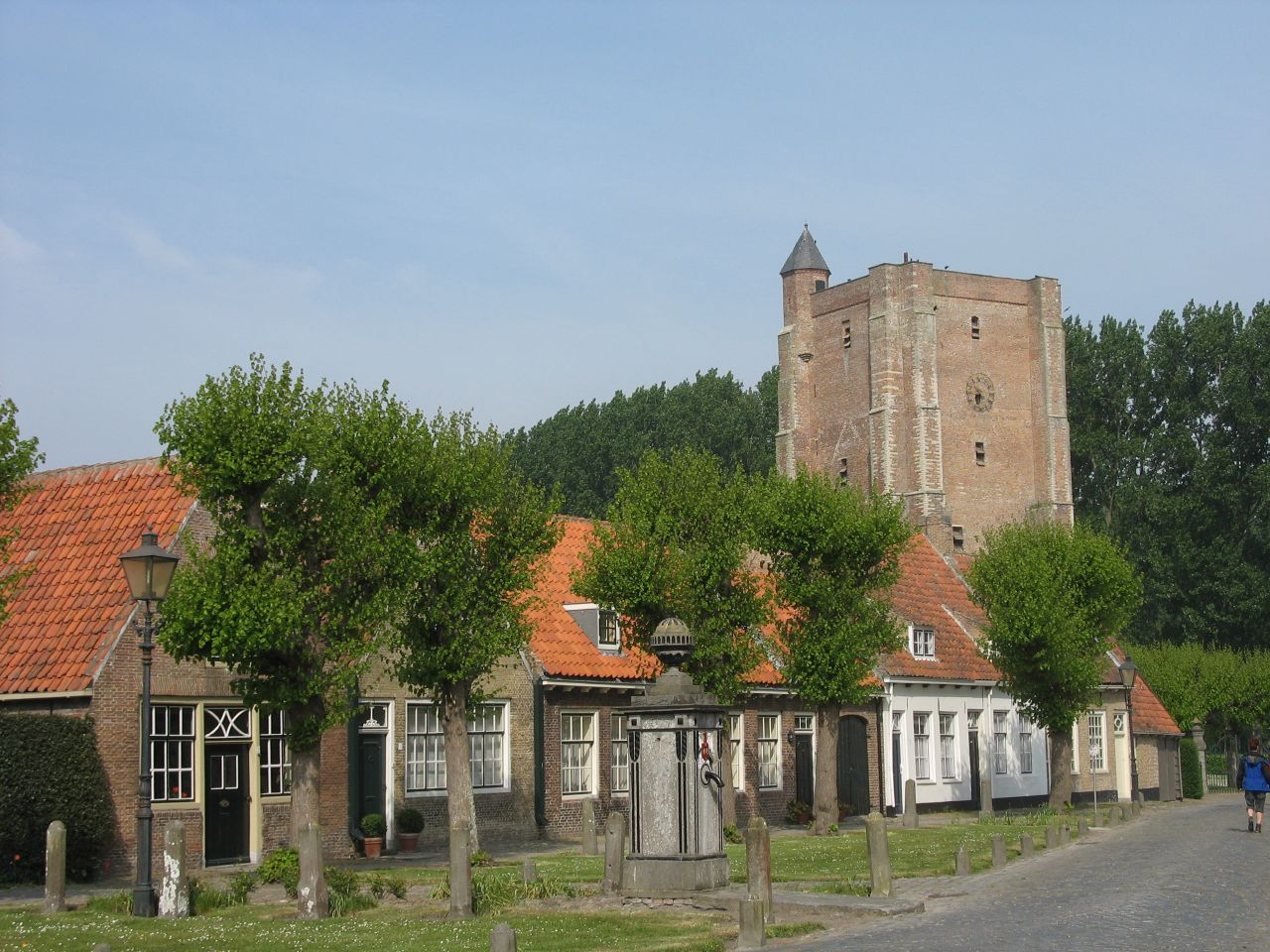

- Flag Coat of arms

- Location in the province of Zeeland in the Netherlands Sint Anna ter Muiden (Netherlands)
- Coordinates: 51°18′52″N 3°21′51″E
- Country: Netherlands
- Province: Zeeland
- Municipality: Sluis

Area
  - Total: 0.34 km^{2} (0.13 sq mi)
- Elevation: 4.5 m (15 ft)

Population (2021)
  - Total: 55
  - Density: 160/km^{2} (420/sq mi)
- Time zone: UTC+1 (CET)
  - Summer (DST): UTC+2 (CEST)
- Postal code: 4524
- Dialing code: 0117

Sint Anna ter Muiden is a small city in the province of Zeeland, Netherlands. It is administratively a part of municipality of Sluis, and the town of Sluis lies about 1 km east. It is located on the westernmost point of the Netherlands (excluding the kingdom's other countries and its special municipalities). It has a population of 50 (as of 2001).

Sint Anna ter Muiden was granted city rights in 1242 by the counts of Flanders, Thomas II of Savoy and Jeanne of Flanders. This makes it today the second smallest place in the Netherlands that bears this traditional designation (after Staverden with just 40 inhabitants).

Sint Anna ter Muiden was a separate municipality until 1880, when it was merged with Sluis. Prior to 1 January 2003, it was in the former municipality of Sluis-Aardenburg.

== Gallery ==
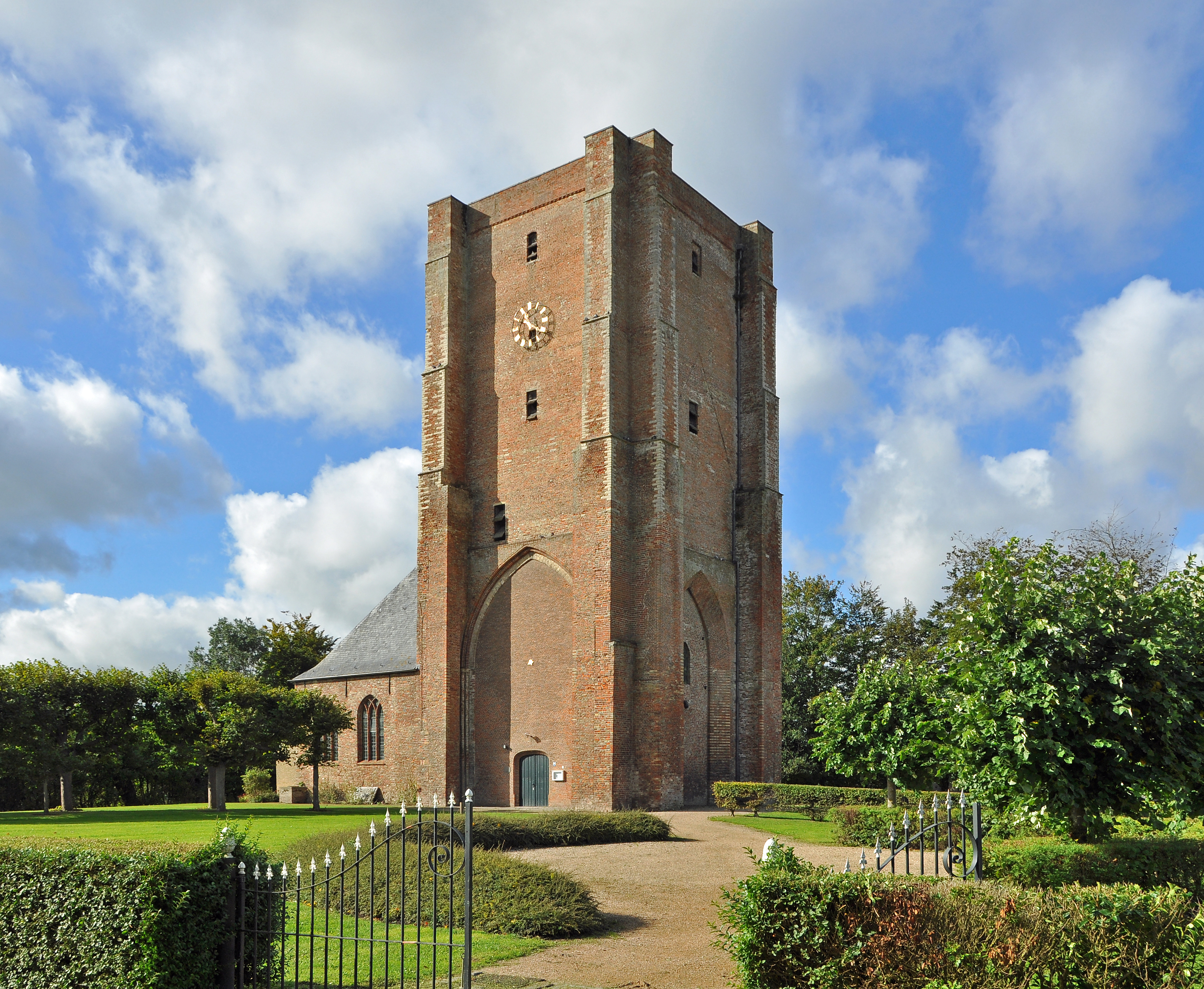
14th-century church tower

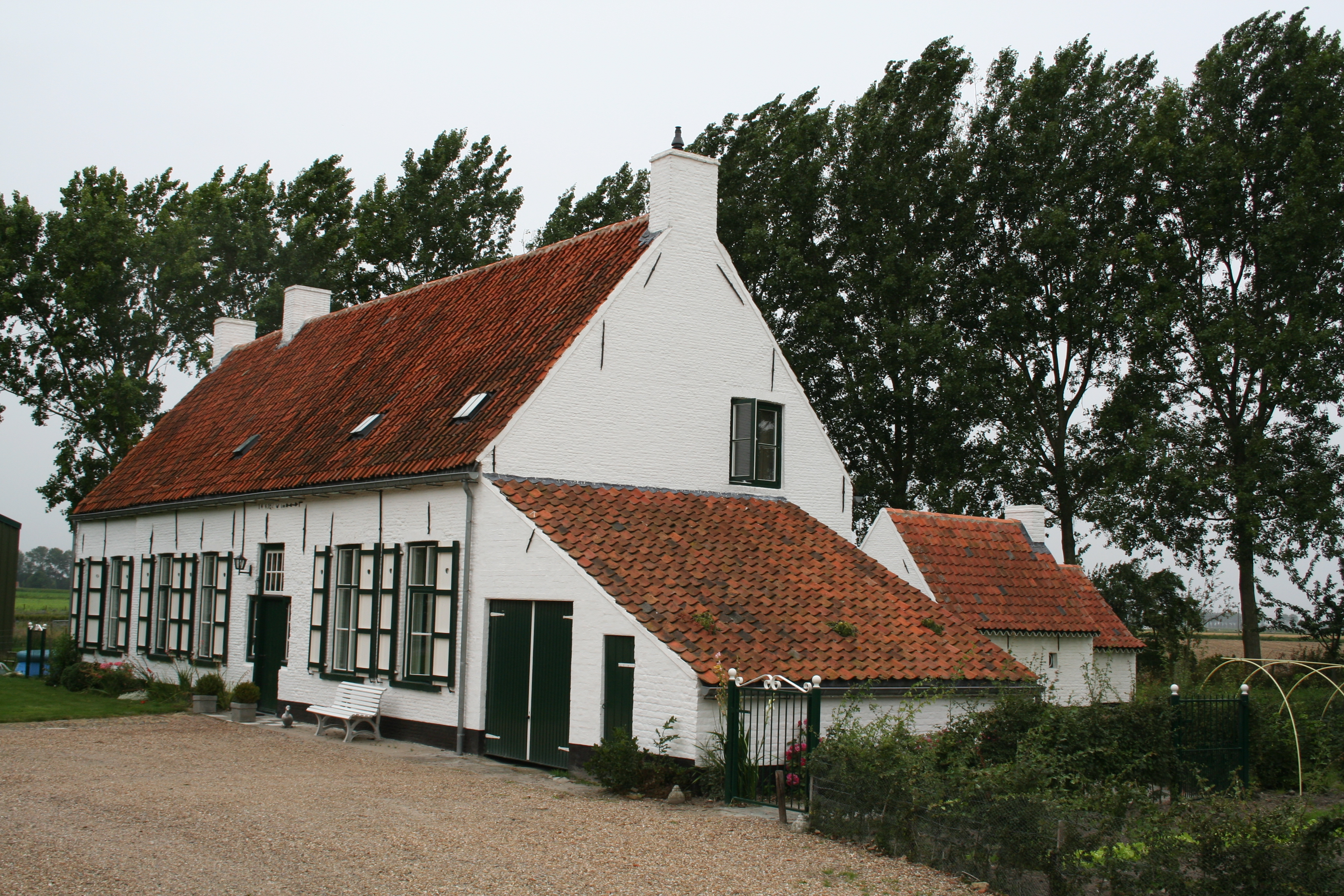
Farm Maneschijnhoeve

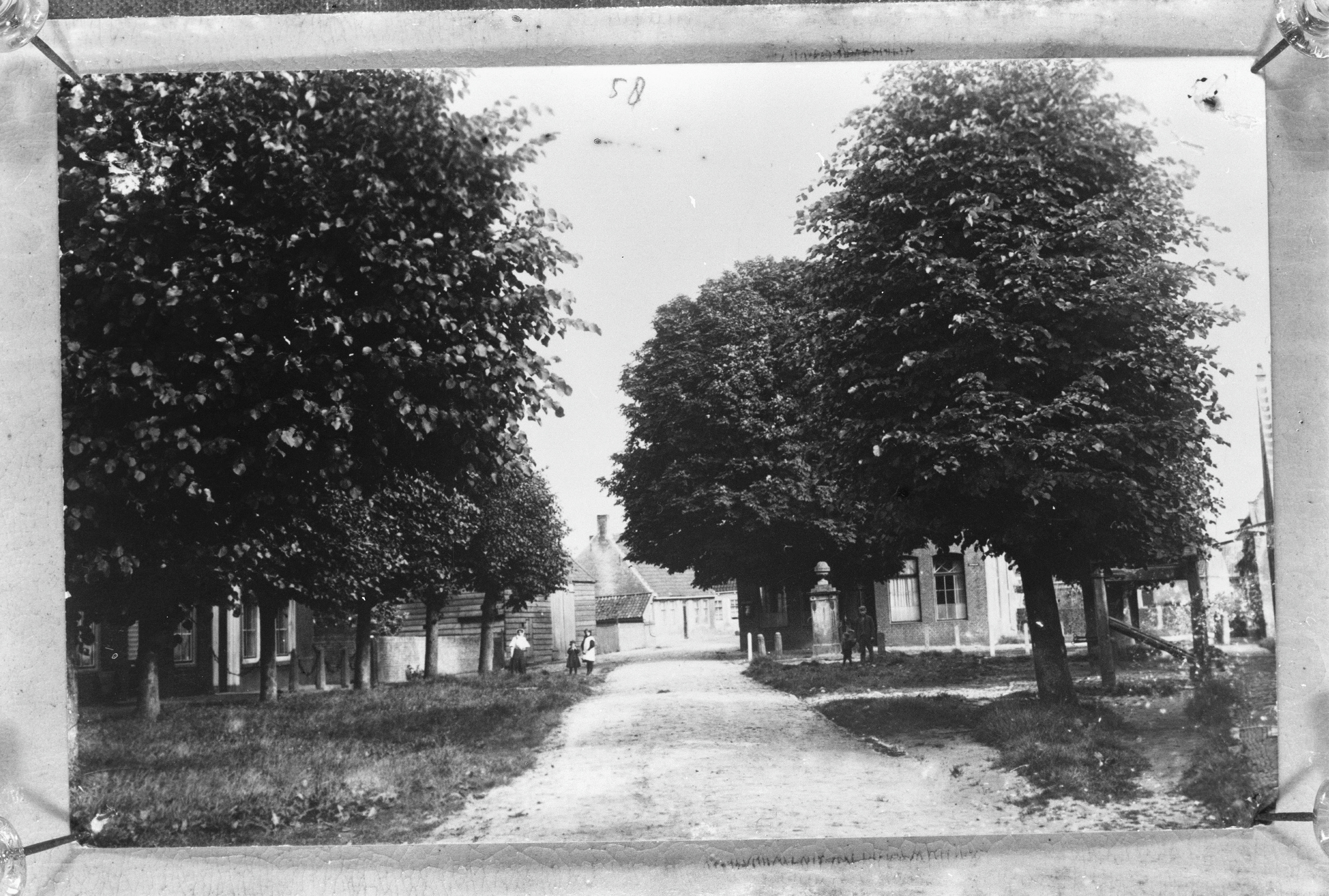
Old picture of the square

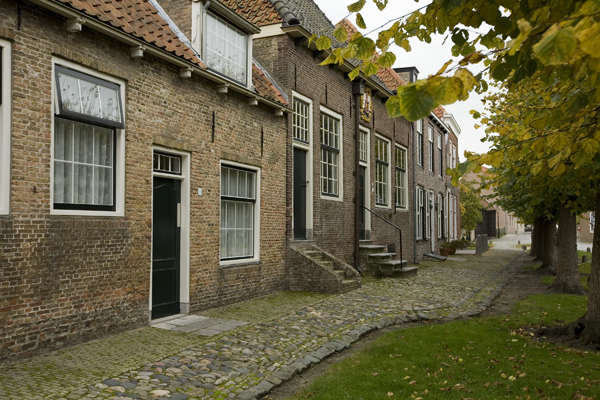
Houses in Sint Anna ter Muiden
