= Marlies =

- Gender: Female
- Language: Dutch and German

Other names
- Variant forms: Maria, Louise, Liesbeth

Marlies may refer to the following:

== Sports teams ==
- Toronto Marlies, an American Hockey League team
- Toronto Marlboros, a former junior hockey team in the Ontario Hockey League, colloquially nicknamed "The Marlies" for short

== People ==
Marlies is a Dutch and German feminine given name. It is a contraction of Maria and either Louise or Liesbeth. People with the name include:

- Marlies Amann-Marxer (born 1952), Liechtenstein Minister of Infrastructure
- Marlies Askamp (born 1970), German basketball player
- Marlies van Baalen (born 1980), Dutch Dressage equestrian
- Marlies Bänziger (born 1960), Swiss politician
- Marlies ter Borg (born 1948), Dutch philosopher, editor and author
- Marlies Deneke (born 1953), East German politician
- Marlies Dekkers (born 1965), Dutch fashion designer
- Marlies Dumbsky (born 1985), German Wine Queen 2008/09
- Marlies Gerber, American mathematician
- Marlies Gipson (born 1987), American basketball player
- Marlies Göhr (born 1958), East German athlete
- Marlies Horn (1912–1991), German tennis player
- Marlies Lause (born 1940), German actress
- Marlies Mejías (born 1992), Cuban road and track cyclist
- Marlies Mosiek-Müller (born 1946), German jurist and politician
- Marlies Oberholzer (born 1958), Swiss alpine skier
- Marlies Oester (born 1976), Swiss alpine skier
- Marlies Oostdam (born 1977), Dutch-New Zealand football player
- Marlies Pohl (born 1955), East German swimmer
- Marlies Rostock (born 1960), East German cross country skier
- Marlies Schild (born 1981), Austrian alpine skier
- Marlies Smulders (born 1982), Dutch rower
- Marlies Somers (born 1973), Dutch voice actor
- Marlies Veldhuijzen van Zanten (born 1953), Dutch State Secretary of Health
- Marlies Verbruggen (born 1988), Belgian footballer
- Marlies Wagner (born 1983), Austrian luger

== See also ==
- Marliese Echner-Klingmann (born 1937), German poet playwright
- Marliese Edelmann (born 1988), Mexican beauty queen
- Marliese Kasner (born 1982), Canadian curler
- Marliece Andrada (born 1972), American Playboy Playmate
