= Liesbeth =

Liesbeth or Liesbet (both pronounced /ˈliːsbɛt/) is a Dutch language feminine given name. It is a relatively common form of Elisabeth, peaking in popularity between 1955 and 1985. An older spelling of the name was "Lijsbeth" People with the name include:

== Liesbeth ==
- Liesbeth van Altena (1833–1906), pen name of the Dutch novelist and playwright Betsy Perk
- Liesbeth Bik (born 1959), Dutch conceptual artist
- Liesbeth Homans (born 1973), Belgian N-VA politician
- Liesbeth Van Impe (born 1977), Belgian journalist
- Liesbeth Kamerling (born 1975), Dutch film actress
- Liesbeth List (1941–2020), Dutch singer, stage actress and television personality
- Liesbeth Mau Asam (born 1982), Dutch short track speed skater
- Liesbeth Messer-Heijbroek (1914–2007), Dutch sculptor and medal maker
- Liesbeth Migchelsen (born 1971), Dutch footballer
- Liesbeth Mouha (born 1983), Belgian beach volleyball player
- Liesbeth Pascal-de Graaff (born 1946), Dutch rower
- Liesbeth van der Pol (born 1959), Dutch architect
- Liesbeth Schlumberger (born 1964), South African organist
- Liesbeth Spies (born 1966), Dutch Minister of the Interior
- Liesbeth van Tongeren (born 1958), Dutch politician and director of Greenpeace Netherlands
- Liesbeth Tuijnman (born 1943), Dutch mayor
- Lieja Tunks (born Liesbeth Jantina Tunks, 1976), Dutch-born Canadian shot putter
- Liesbeth Vernout (born 1958), Dutch cricketer
- Liesbeth Vosmaer-de Bruin (born 1946), Dutch rower
- Liesbeth Zegveld (born 1970), Dutch lawyer, legal expert and professor

== Liesbet ==
- Liesbet De Vocht (born 1979), Belgian road bicycle racer
- Liesbet Dreesen (born 1976), Belgian swimmer
- Liesbet Hooghe (born 1962), Belgian political scientist
- Liesbet Van Breedam (born 1979), Belgian beach volleyball player
- Liesbet Vindevoghel (born 1979), Belgian volleyball player
