= Sophia Polder =

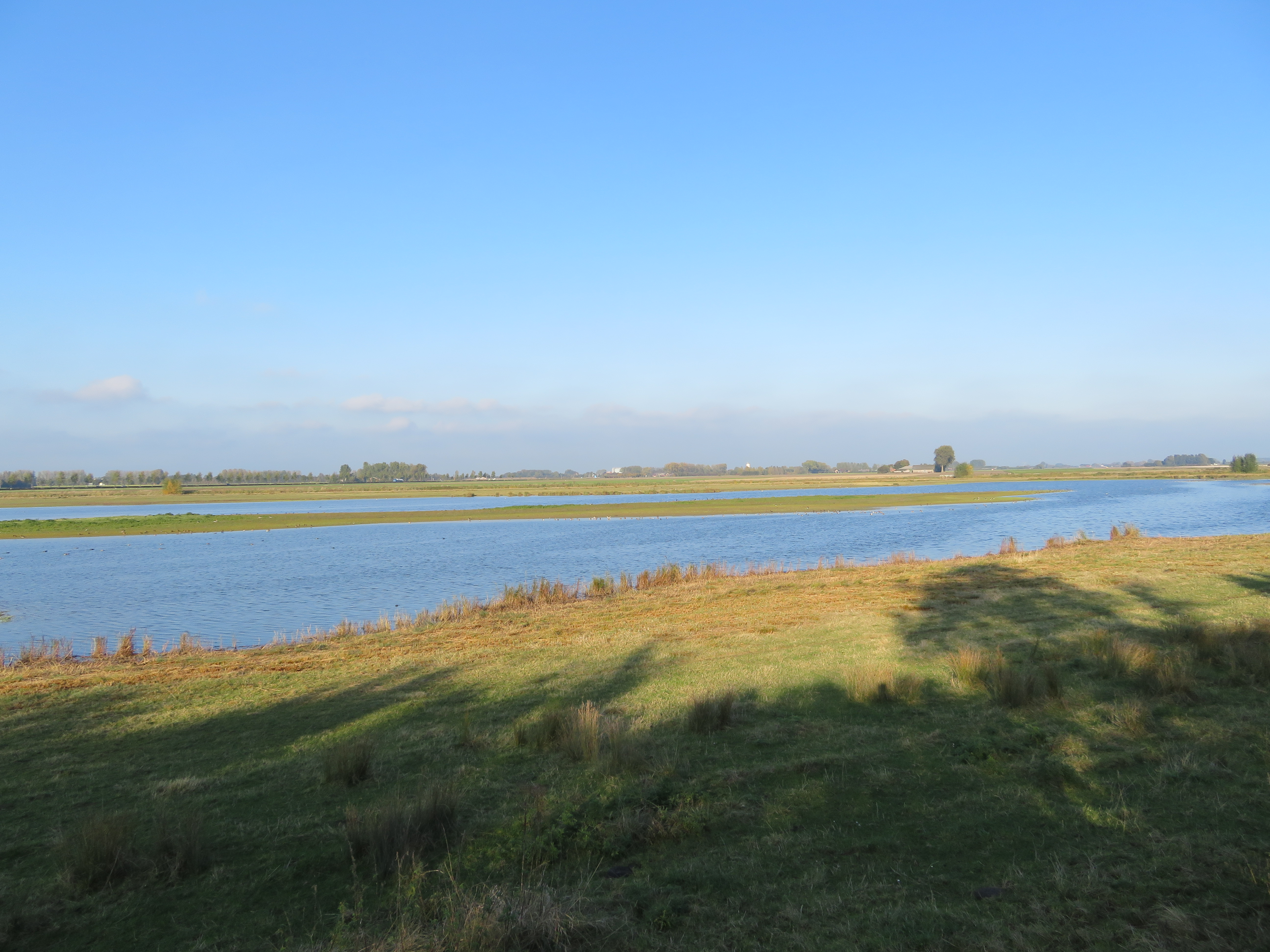

- Location within Zeeland
- Location: South of Oostburg, Zeeland, Netherlands
- Coordinates: 51°18′28.9″N 3°28′18.66″E
- Type: Polder
- Etymology: Named after General Dominique Vandamme's wife, Sophia
- First flooded: 1788

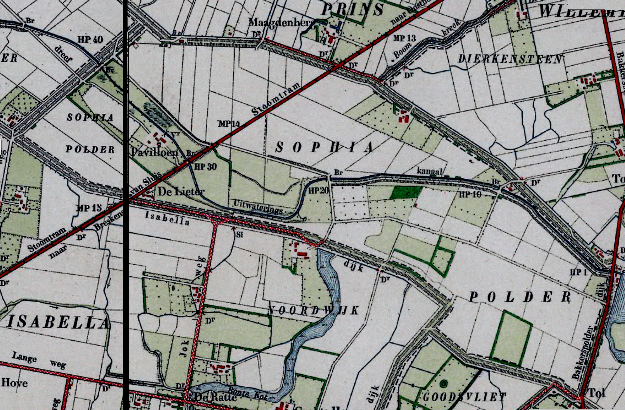
Map of the Sophia Polder 1913

The Sophia Polder is a polder to the south of Oostburg, Netherlands. It is one of a group of polders in the Ottevaere en Van Damme polder complex. A refuge for water birds, it has been a designated nature reserve since 2006.

== History ==
The Sophia Polder originated as an area of marshes in the Passageule (estuary), blocked off by the Bakkersdam (1788) as part of works to improve navigability of the Western Scheldt. Naturally occurring silting was here accelerated by the Bakkerdam's construction. Around 1800, the land was gifted to Dominique Vandamme as a reward for his military exploits on behalf of the empire. In 1807, a further damming exercise took place under orders from General Vandamme (which also gave rise to the Austerlitzpolder. The resulting polder has grown to an area of approximately 329 hectares (810 acres). It was named the Sophia Polder, after General Vandamme's wife.

The general constructed a wooden pavilion on the polder to be used as a summer residence. In 1860 this was enlarged, becoming a farmstead. It continues to be known as "the pavilion" ("het Paviljoen" or "het Paviljoen Van Damme").

Since the time of General Vandamme the landscape of the Sophia Polder has been further affected by drainage work and sand extraction. The hamlet of Bakkerdam has developed at the eastern end of the polder. From here, the drainage canal ("uitwateringskanaal") flows in a westerly direction along the northerly edge of the polder, following the line of what was formerly the Passageule. To the south of the drainage canal, sand extraction has created a marshy creek which forms a natural magnet for water birds. Its attraction to water birds has been enhanced by further land management measures undertaken since the polder was designated a wild life reserve in 2006. The entire area is regulated by a so-called "semi-natural water level management" system ("semi-natuurlijk peilbeheer"). For the purposes of these measures the polder was divided into three zones. Sophiapolder West (Phase 1) was completed in 2006 and Sophiapolder-Middle (Phase 2) was completed in 2008. There is no agreed starting (or completion) date for Sophiapolder East (Phase 3). The water level in middle section is deeper than that in the western section: the middle section includes a large flat island which is a prime nesting location for water birds. For the eastern section, less sand extraction is anticipated which will make the zone less suitable for nesting seabirds, but more effective as a reserve for rare marsh plant species.
