= Conference for the Reduction and Limitation of Armaments =

1932–34 meeting in Switzerland on global disarmament

Geneva Conference
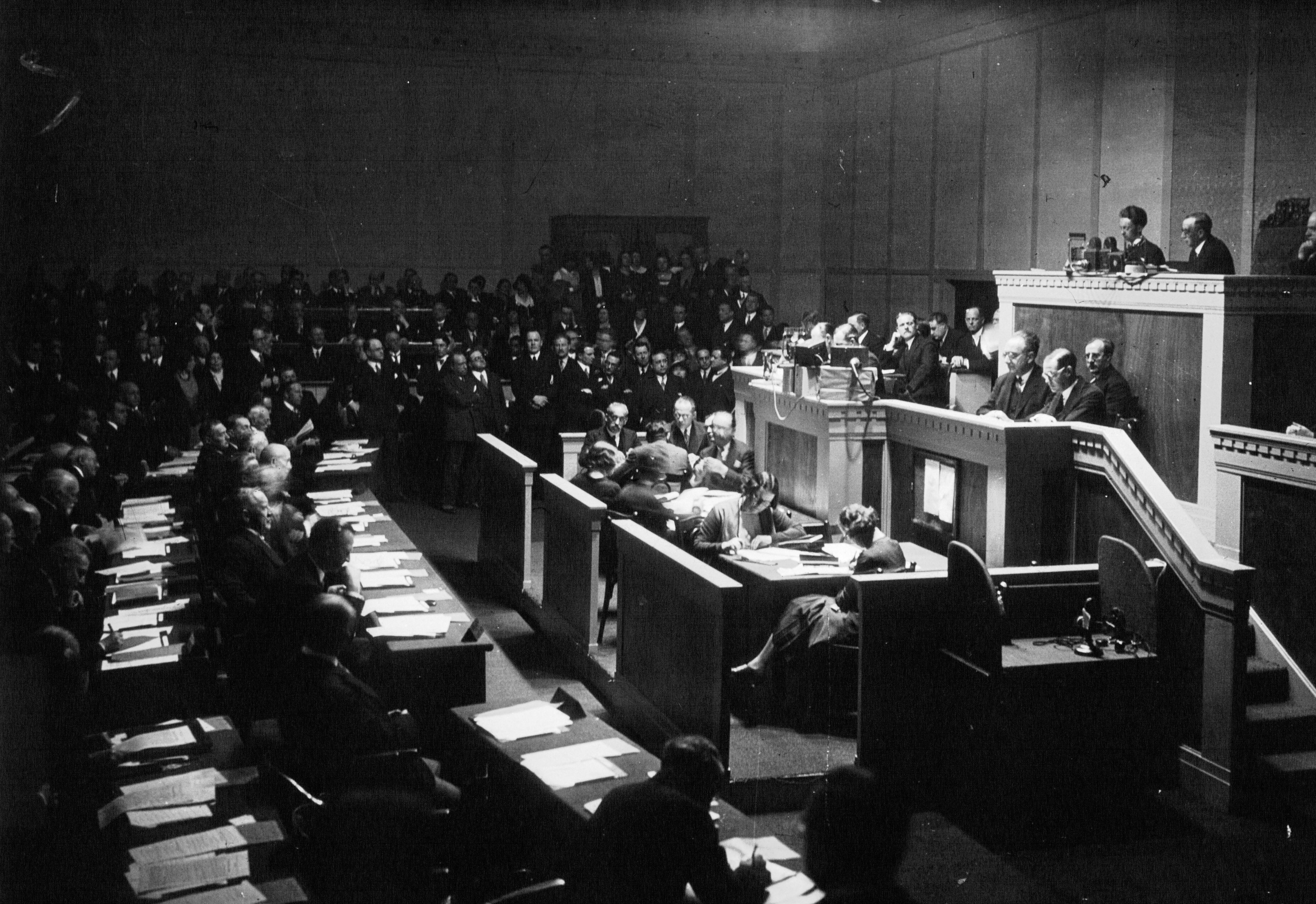
- Arthur Henderson speaking at the conference on 2 February 1932
- Begins: 1 February 1932
- Ends: November 1934
- Location: Geneva
- Coordinates: 46.2044° N, 6.1432° E
- Country: Switzerland
- Participants: 31 nations
- Organiser: League of Nations

The Conference for the Reduction and Limitation of Armaments, generally known as the Geneva Conference or World Disarmament Conference, was an international conference of states held in Geneva, Switzerland, between February 1932 and November 1934 to accomplish disarmament in accordance with the Covenant of the League of Nations. It was attended by 61 states, most of which were members of the League of Nations, but the USSR and the United States also attended.

The conference was a response to the militarisation of global powers during and after the First World War. Aimed towards a global reduction in arms, the conference was organised and campaigned for by the League of Nations with the main objective to avoid another world war.

The conference symbolised global co-operation to a combined goal of limiting arms, but it is generally perceived as a failure because of the onset of the Second World War five years later and the withdrawal of Nazi Germany from both the conference and the League.

The conference's main objectives included defining aggressively-offensive weapons, reasonably-defensive weapons, abolishing submarines, aviation and heavy-duty tanks and limiting land forces.

== Background ==
=== Legacy of First World War ===
During the First World War, the world, particularly Europe, underwent a vast development in arms. During the course of the war, technology surrounding weaponry development and new types of arms emerged: specifically, a focus on not only land equipment and personal but also the navy and the air force, which Borg described as having "considerable weight and influence".

The developments included aircraft for infantry support, reconnaissance, and bombing; naval warfare, with submarines such as German U-boats; and land armaments, including poison gases, machine guns, and grenades.

The aim of the Geneva Conference was disarmament that would target land, air, and naval programs.

After the war, the extensive death toll and the social effects of total war resulted in a general antiwar sentiment, one favoring disarmament. The British Women's Society received 8 million signatures for disarmament and was accredited with a driving force behind the convening of the conference.

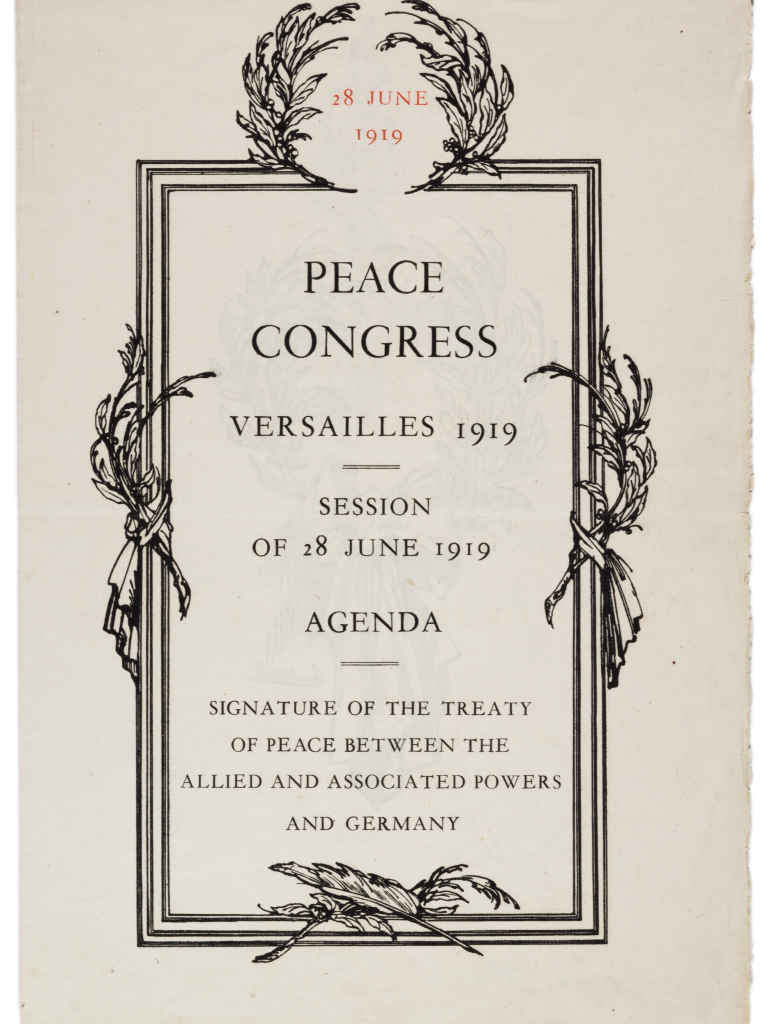
The Treaty of Versailles

The Treaty of Versailles laid out the terms for the Germans' conditional surrender, including their national disarmament.

- Article 160 stated that the German Army was to have no more than 7 infantry divisions and 3 cavalry divisions, with 100,000 men and 4000 officers.
- Article 165 limited German guns, machine guns, ammunition, and rifles.
- Article 168 limited the manufacture of munitions, which was to be overseen by the League of Nations.
- Article 170 limited importations of arms.

=== Diplomatic preliminaries ===
The first effort at international arms limitation was made at the Hague Conferences of 1899 and 1907, which had failed in their primary objective. Although many contemporary commentators and Article 231 of the Treaty of Versailles blamed the outbreak of the war on the war guilt of Germany, historians writing in the 1930s emphasised the quick arms race before 1914. Also, all of the major powers except the United States had committed themselves to disarmament in both the Treaty of Versailles and in the Covenant of the League of Nations. A substantial international nongovernmental campaign to promote disarmament also developed in the 1920s and the early 1930s.

A preparatory commission was initiated by the League in 1925. By 1931, there was sufficient support to hold a conference, which duly began under the chairmanship of former British Foreign Secretary Arthur Henderson. The motivation behind the talks can be summed up by an extract from the message that US President Franklin Roosevelt had sent: "If all nations will agree wholly to eliminate from possession and use the weapons which make possible a successful attack, defences automatically will become impregnable and the frontiers and independence of every nation will become secure". The League of Nations failed to ensure the success of the talks, which impacted the likelihood of a second major European conflict.

== Nations involved ==
The Geneva Conference involved all of the nations signatory to the Covenant of the League of Nations, which included the United Kingdom, France, Italy and Japan as permanent members of the League of Nations Council. It included all the Allies that had signed the Treaty of Versailles with Germany and all neutral countries such as Switzerland that had vested interests in disarmament in Europe specifically.

According to Gumbrecht, the League of Nations had been created with "the ideal of establishing a family of nations united by shared goals of peace".” The Covenant of the League of Nations had been published on 28 April 1919 by unanimous agreement.

Covenant of the League of Nations

Article 8 of the Covenant stated that "the members of the League recognise that the maintenance of peace requires the reduction of national armaments to the lowest point consistent with national safety and the enforcement by common action of international obligations".

The Geneva Conference was convened by the League of Nations in 1932 to fulfil the terms of Article 8 and to progress towards world peace by the process of disarmament.

== Negotiations ==
The conference convened on the 1 February 1932 in Geneva, Switzerland, with the intention of implementing strategies to fulfill Article 8 of the Covenant of the League of Nations.

The US ambassador to Belgium and minister to Switzerland and conference delegate, Hugh S. Gibson, had observed not long after the London Conference, the US had lost interest in the new conference because treaties already limited its navy, its army was so small that further reduction was ludicrous and the proposed measures of air limitation were so vague that they meant little. He wrote that the conference would "probably meet in February or March 1932 and, discouraging as it may sound, it will probably go on and on". He had come to believe that armaments would never be abolished completely but that treaties might maintain military balances.

The negotiations can be split into five distinctive categories or periods. As classified by the military historian Arther Steiner, "first period – emphasis on security, second period – appointment of commissions, third period – the general commissions, fourth period – the technical commission and the fifth period – the Hoover Proposals".

=== Emphasis on security ===
This specifically focused on the geopolitical relations of the period, which included USSR, Turkey, Iran, France and Germany. The main focus was France and developing relations that reassured that it could safely disarm, which involved a development of American-French and Anglo-French relationships.

=== Appointment of commissions ===
This began of 25 February 1933 and involved finding a representative from each state. Together, they formed the General Commission, which delegated into the Naval and Air Commissions. This stage was concluded by 18 March 1933.

=== General Commission ===
The third period, the General Commission, had the bulk of the negotiations take place. The conference began to attempt to enact the goals of the League of Nations, which primarily involved classifying classes of weaponry and fortifications.

==== Classifying weaponry ====
The Covenant of the League of Nations defined national armaments as referring to generalised military forces including personnel, equipment, technology etc. The conference intended to differentiate between offensive and defensive weapons. The negotiations centred largely on offensive weapons to stop future attacks, rather than reduce nations' defensive weapons. However, nations often disagreed about the technicalities of certain weaponry.

Sir Basil Liddell Hart, a British military historian who was known largely for his strategy surrounding mechanical warfare, was present at the conference. He contended that tanks, a new development from the First World War, were both offensive and defensive weapons and so could not be classified as either. However, Winston Churchill disagreed by arguing that the offensive capabilities of tanks were tremendous and outweighed any defensive capabilities. The turmoil and the inability to agree halted the progression of the conference.

==== Fortifications ====
A key negotiation of the conference involved the discussions surrounding armed fortifications. It was agreed unanimously that any fortifications remaining from the First World War that had not been developed before the war along borders would be abolished. Also, coastal fortifications except between the Baltic Sea and the North Sea could remain but not be worked on, extended or built up.

==== Additional discussions ====
In addition, other discussions were brought up during the General Commission such as whether the agreements were still in place during wartime, whether other regulatory bodies should be established to monitor and to enforce it and whether there should be demilitarised zones. Those issues were agreed upon with the ideal that the agreements set about should apply to both wartime and peacetime, a nonpolitical body should monitor disarmament and there should be no specific demilitarised zones.

=== Technical Commission ===
This period was known for its high levels of debate, disagreement and technical issues. Essentially no agreement or progress occurred during this session.

=== Hoover's proposals ===
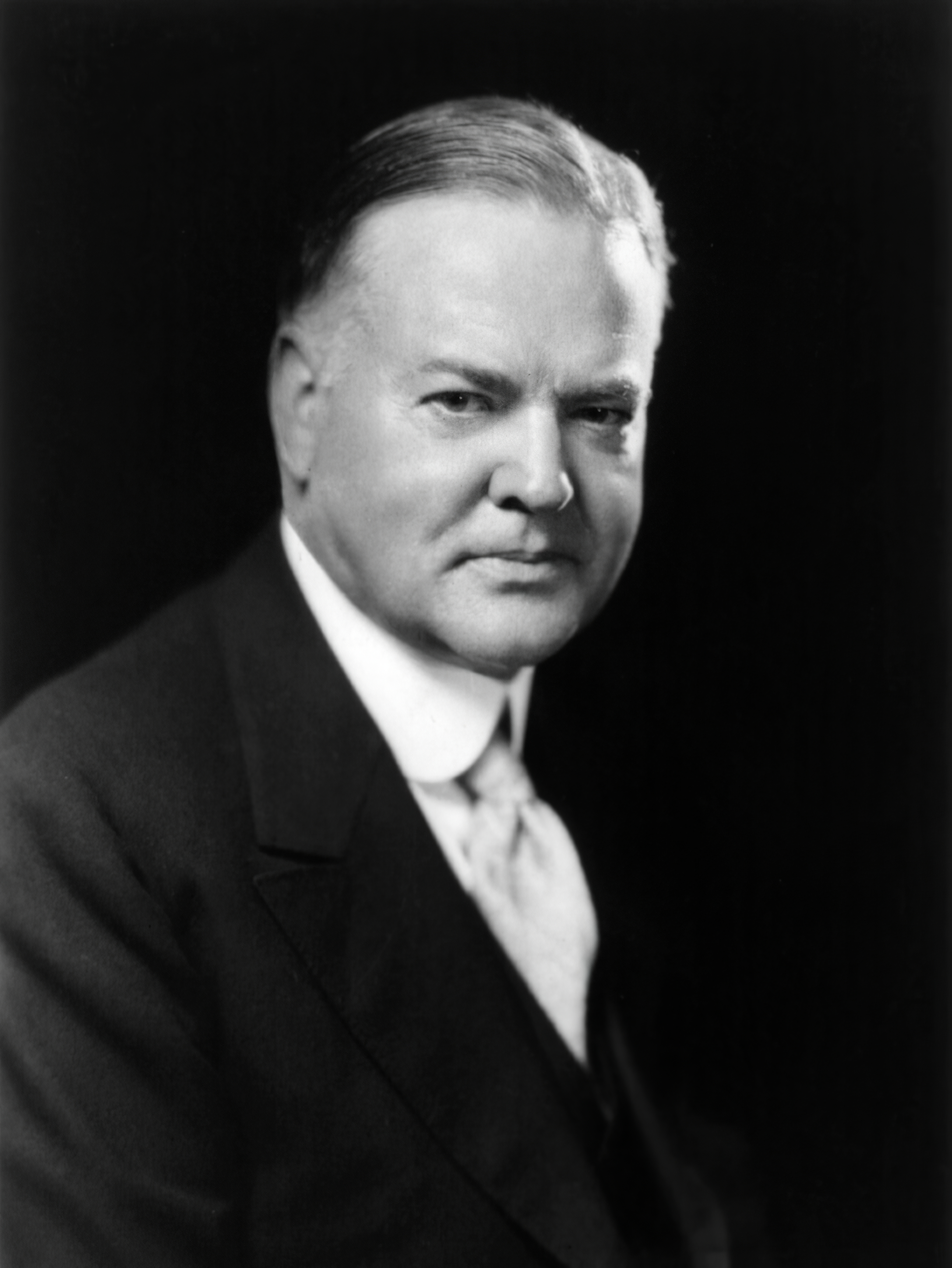
Portrait of President Herbert Hoover

The US then sent a delegate to Geneva and became heavily involved in the Conference.

US President Herbert Hoover acknowledged the failure and the lack of progress for the conference and proposed for the US to take the lead on disarmament. As argued by Marlies ter Borg, the proposal that Hoover presented to the conference on the 22 June 1932 was a "potential turning point" by suggesting that the US would abolish all aircraft, submarines, military aviation, tanks, poison gas and one third of the battleships.

The involvement of the United States "injected life into a nearly dead conference". However, these proposals were never passed through the US Congress, and although they showed the promise and the spirit of disarmament, they did not resonate in the conference.

== Problems ==
The General Commission made progress with having nations agree on a number of terms. However, it was unsuccessful in having individual nations implement its terms.

There was a failure to obtain a German-French agreement on German arms, as the French did not want to disarm without a guaranteed alliance if war broke out with Germany again. Czechoslovakia and Poland were vulnerable because of their geographical proximity to Germany, and the French feared that they would be attacked again with no way to defend themselves if they disarmed.

In 1932 and 1933, the USSR, led by Joseph Stalin underwent the widespread Soviet Famine. The USSR was occupied with national issues and was rarely present at the conference. In addition, during the interwar period, Stalin led the modernisation and buildup of the Soviet Army. That included a peacetime size of 1,100,000 and compulsory military service. In December 1931, Vyacheslav Molotov talked about "[the] growing danger of military intervention against the USSR". That meant that like many other countries, the USSR was hesitant to disarm.

Additionally, Japan invaded Manchuria on 18 September 1931 after the Mukden Incident and became hesitant and hostile to the whole idea of disarmament. Its disagreement caused it not to be present or involved with negotiations.

== Departure of Germany ==
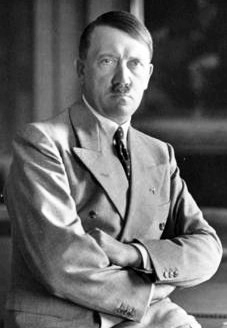
Portrait of Adolf Hitler (1936)

Adolf Hitler came to power in January 1933 and quickly gained complete authority over the German government. He first proposed an universal disarmament of all nations, but France couldn’t accept the deal. So he withdrew Germany from the League of Nations and then the Geneva Conference in October 1933. He temporarily rejoined the Geneva Conference under the Five-Power Agreement but quickly withdrew Germany again as progressions with the conference began to halt.

The military superiority of Germany was a defining element of Hitler's ideology and foreign policy, which made the idea of disarmament unacceptable. As soon as Hitler rose to power, he began the process of rearming Germany, clearly defying both the Treaty of Versailles and the objective of the Disarmament Conference. Hitler drew on the unwillingness of other countries to disarm as a justification that Germany should not be forced to do the same.

== Aftermath ==
Ultimately, when Hitler withdrew Germany from the League of Nations and the Treaty of Versailles the French were unwilling to disarm. The conference was ultimately adjourned in November 1934. The British Foreign Office stated that “the failure of the Disarmament Conference would have incalculable consequences for Europe and the League [of Nations]”.

US Secretary of State Henry L. Stimson later wrote that Americans regarded the Geneva Conference as "a European peace conference with European political questions to be settled. The necessary work of settling them must be done by the leaders of Europe". Stimson realised that Germany's position in European affairs could not be ignored, as it had been at Geneva in 1927 or at London in 1930, but he did not know how to reconcile German military ambition with French fear of its neighbour. Stimson hoped the Europeans to find a solution. He also hesitated over further naval disarmament because of the Manchurian crisis and particularly worried whether the US Navy had enough aircraft carriers for a possible action in the Far East.

The exact reasons are not clear or agreed by historians for exactly why the conference failed. However, most academic sources and historians blame a combination of the rise of Hitler, the consequent withdrawal of Germany from the conference, the general unwillingness of nations to disarm, the highly-unstable political and economic climate and the looming threat of another world war.

== Sources ==
- Davies, Thomas. "France and the World Disarmament Conference of 1932–34." Diplomacy and Statecraft 15.4 (2004): 765–780. online
- Fanning, Richard Ward, Peace and Disarmament, Naval Rivalry and Arms Control, 1922–1933, The University Press of Kentucky, Lexington, 1995.
- Kitching, Carolyn, Britain and the Geneva Disarmament Conference, Palgrave MacMillan, Houndmills, New York, 2003
- Noel-Baker, Philip John. "First World Disarmament Conference and Why It Failed" (1979)
- Schuman, Frederick L. Europe On The Eve 1933–1939 (1939) pp 28–54. online
- Steiner, Zara. The Triumph of the Dark: European International History 1933–1939 (2011) pp 9–61.
- Temperley, A.C. The Whispering Gallery Of Europe (1938), highly influential account online
