= Nieuwvliet =

- Village
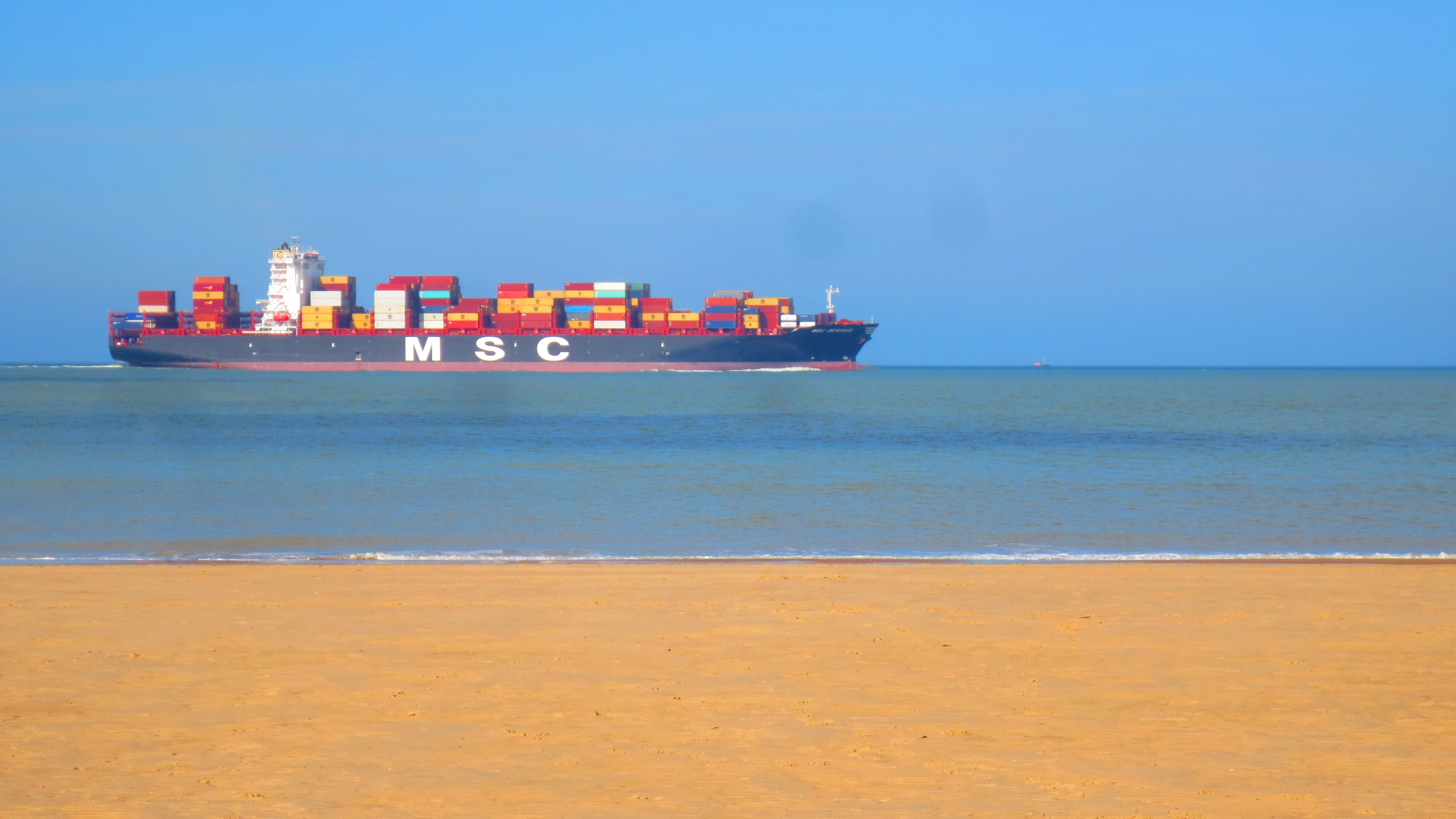
- Beach of Nieuwvliet

- Coat of arms

- Location in the province of Zeeland in the Netherlands Nieuwvliet (Netherlands)
- Coordinates: 51°22′19″N 3°28′17″E
- Country: Netherlands
- Province: Zeeland
- Municipality: Sluis

Area
  - Total: 12.03 km^{2} (4.64 sq mi)
- Elevation: 2.5 m (8.2 ft)

Population (2021)
  - Total: 400
  - Density: 33/km^{2} (86/sq mi)
- Time zone: UTC+1 (CET)
  - Summer (DST): UTC+2 (CEST)
- Postal code: 4504
- Dialing code: 0117

Nieuwvliet is a village in the Dutch province of Zeeland. It is located about 5 km north of Oostburg, in the municipality of Sluis

The village was first mentioned in 1514 as Nieuvliet. "Vliet" means stream. Nieuw (new) was added to distinguish from another vliet, however there are multiple candidates. The current village developed after the Groote Sint Annapolder was poldered in 1602.

Around 1650, the polder contained two hamlets: Nieuwvliet and Sinte Pier. Nieuwvliet was home to Dutch Reformed, and Sint Pier to Mennonites. The Mennonites built a church in 1656, and the Dutch Reformed followed in 1658. Most of the Mennonites left, and the congregation of Sinte Pier was dissolved in 1777. The Dutch Reformed church was damaged during World War II and restored in 1949.

Nieuwvliet was home to 830 people in 1840. It was a separate municipality until 1970, when it was merged with Oostburg. In 2003, it became part of the municipality of Sluis.

Nieuwvliet-Bad is a seaside resort near Nieuwvliet. It has a very wide beach, and contains bungalow parks, campsites and recreational areas.
