= IJzendijke =

- Small city
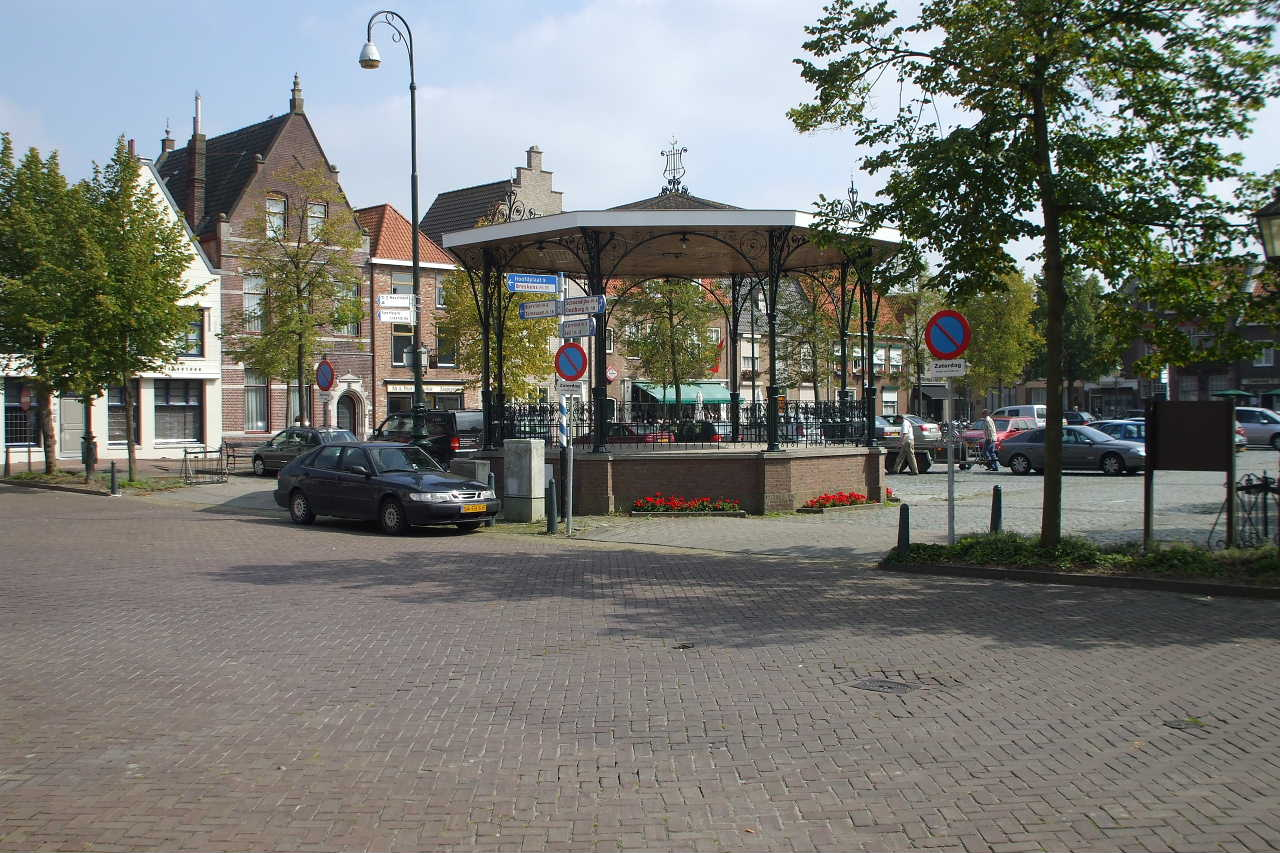
- IJzendijke - the market

- Flag Coat of arms

- Location in the province of Zeeland in the Netherlands IJzendijke (Netherlands)
- Coordinates: 51°19′17″N 3°36′59″E
- Country: Netherlands
- Province: Zeeland
- Municipality: Sluis

Area
  - Total: 47.08 km^{2} (18.18 sq mi)
- Elevation: 2.2 m (7.2 ft)

Population (2021)
  - Total: 2,400
  - Density: 51/km^{2} (130/sq mi)
- Time zone: UTC+1 (CET)
  - Summer (DST): UTC+2 (CEST)
- Postal code: 4515
- Dialing code: 0117

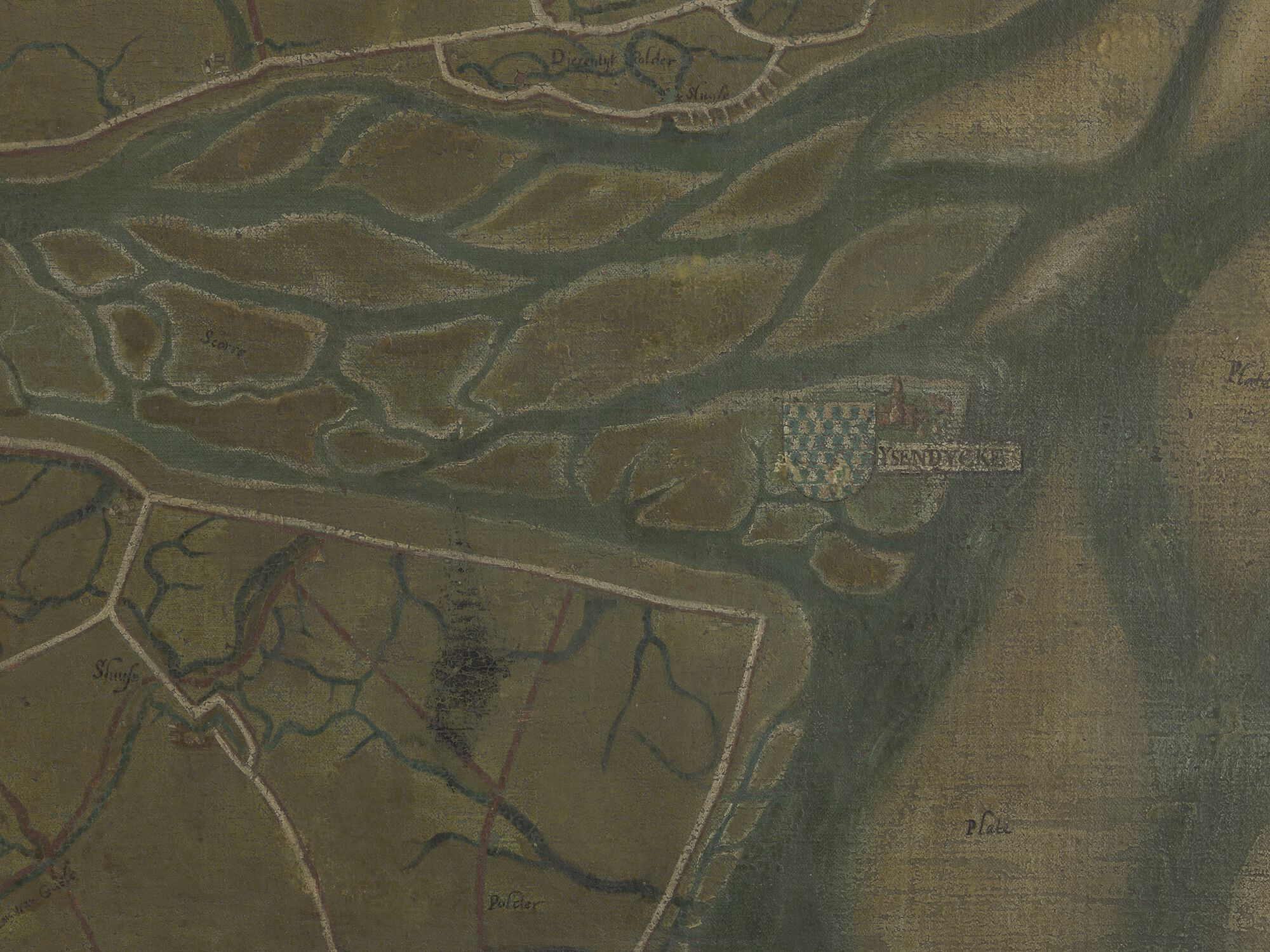
IJzendijke on the map of the Liberty Of Bruges by Pieter Pourbus, 1571

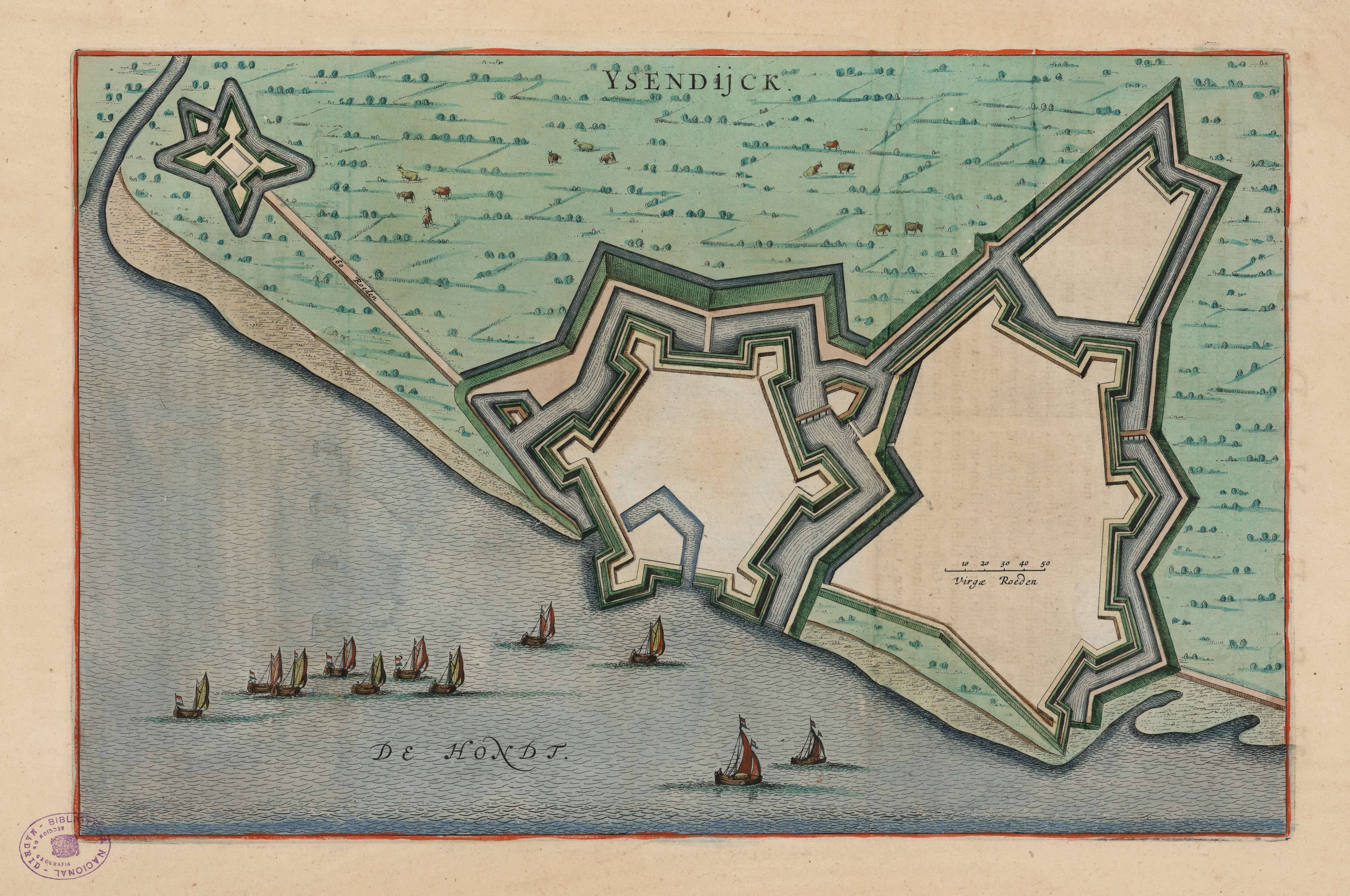
1649 map of IJzendijke in Willem and Joan Blaeu's "Toonneel der Steden"

IJzendijke is a city in the municipality of Sluis, about 10 km east of Oostburg, in the Dutch province of Zeeland.

The town received city rights in 1303.

== History ==
The town was first mentioned in 1127 as Isendica, and means "dike of Iso (person)". IJzendijke used to be a possession of the Saint Peter's Abbey in Ghent. In 1127, it joined the Flemish Hanseatic League. In 1303, it received city rights. It was flooded in 1374, and lost completely in the St. Elizabeth's flood of 1404.

In 1587, a sconce was constructed by the Spanish troops, and conquered by Maurice, Prince of Orange in 1604. Two polders were constructed, and after 1618, an octagon fortress was built with a central market square. In 1648, IJzendijke became a garrison city.

The Dutch Reformed church is an aisleless church built between 1612 and 1614. Between 1656 and 1659, it was enlarged to a stretched octagon. The war damage was repaired in 1949.

Even though the fortress was deemed unconquerable, Napoleon managed to take the city. IJzendijk was home to 2,068 people in 1840. The fortification were demolished between 1841 and 1843 except for a western part.

The southern part of the IJzendijke was severely damaged in 1944. IJzendijke was a separate municipality until 1970. Prior to 2003, the town was in the municipality of Oostburg. In 2003, it became part of the municipality of Sluis.

== Gallery ==
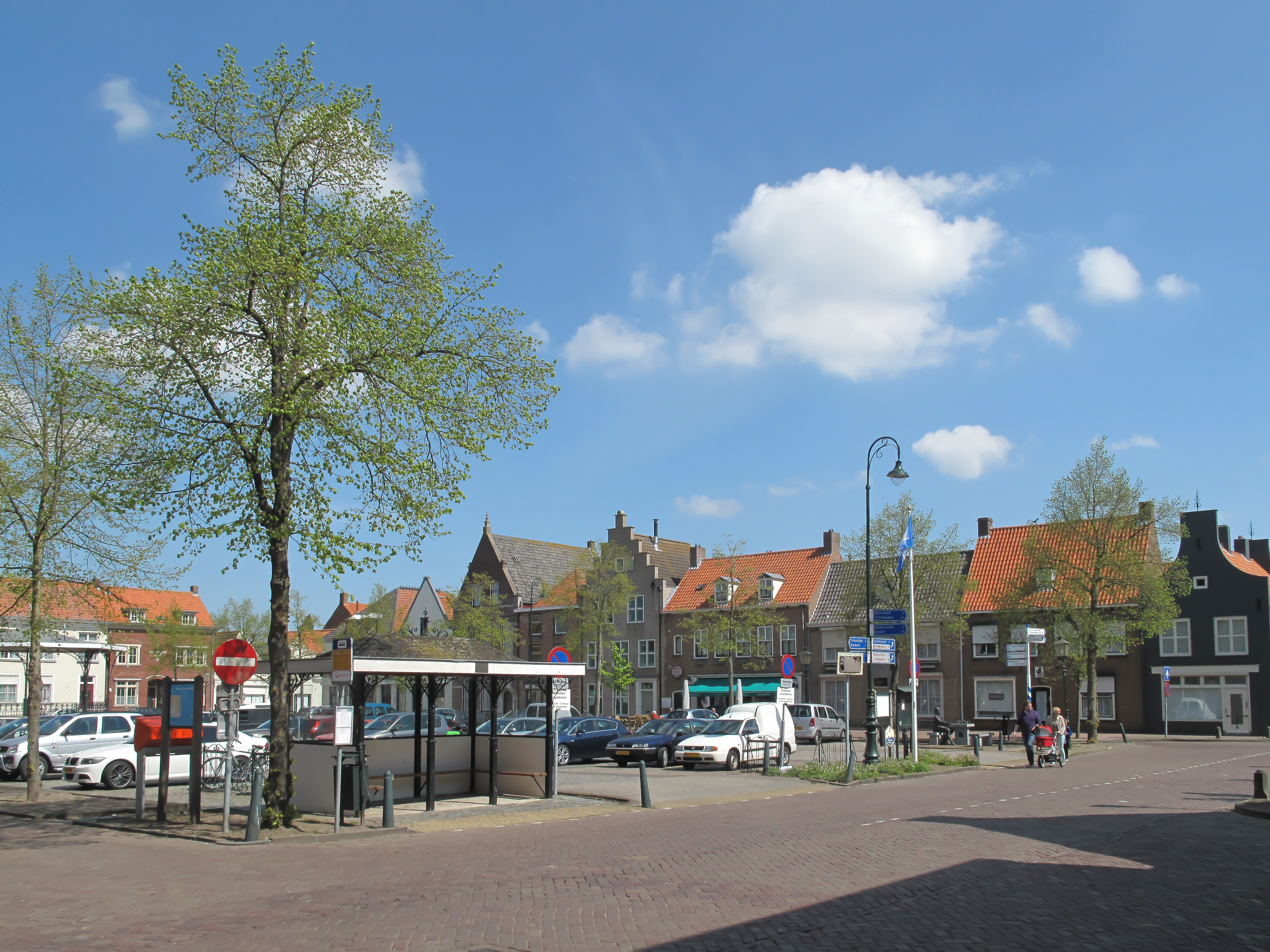
Central square

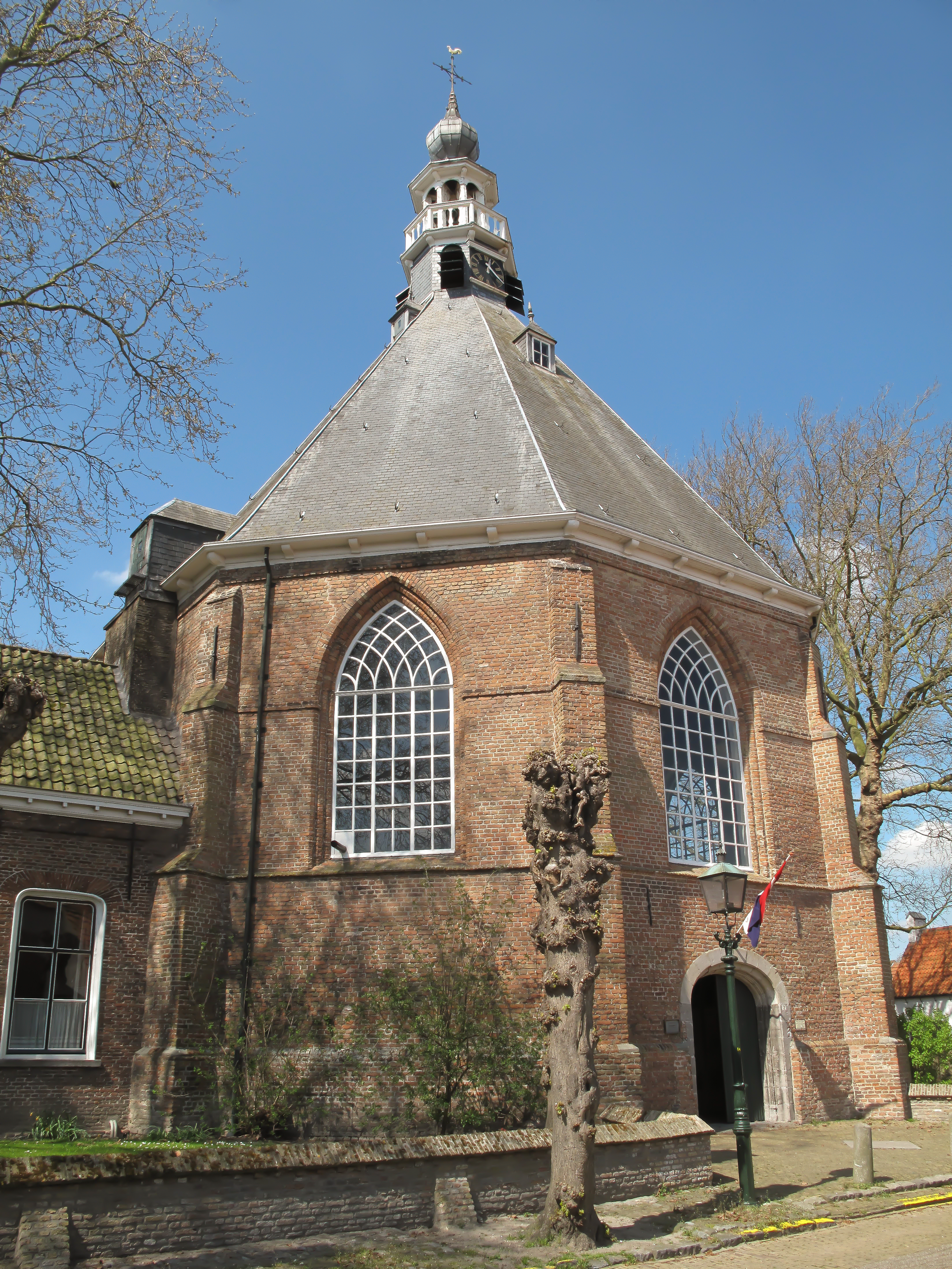
Reformed church

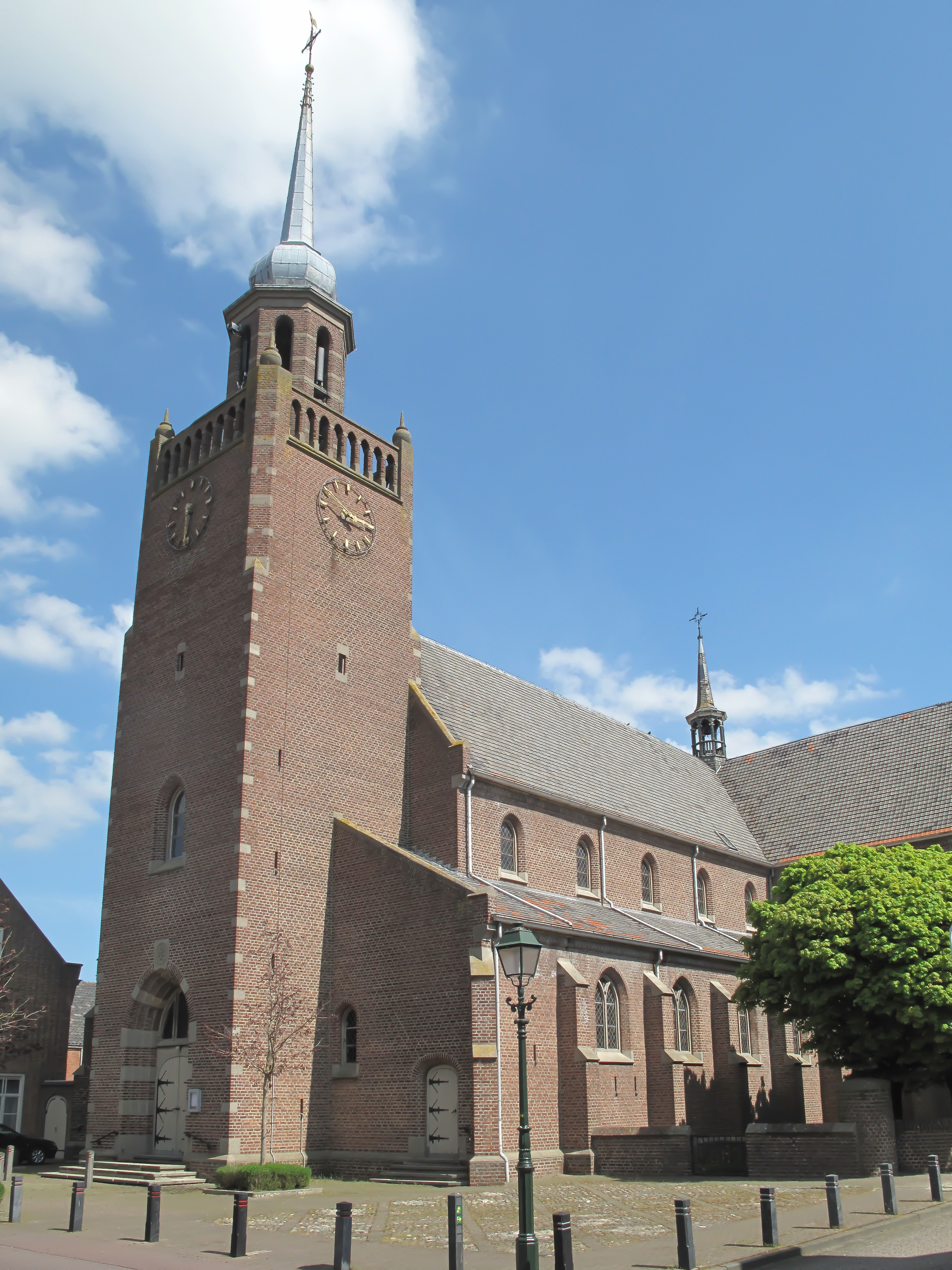
Church: de Onze Lieve Vrouwe ten Hemelopnemingskerk

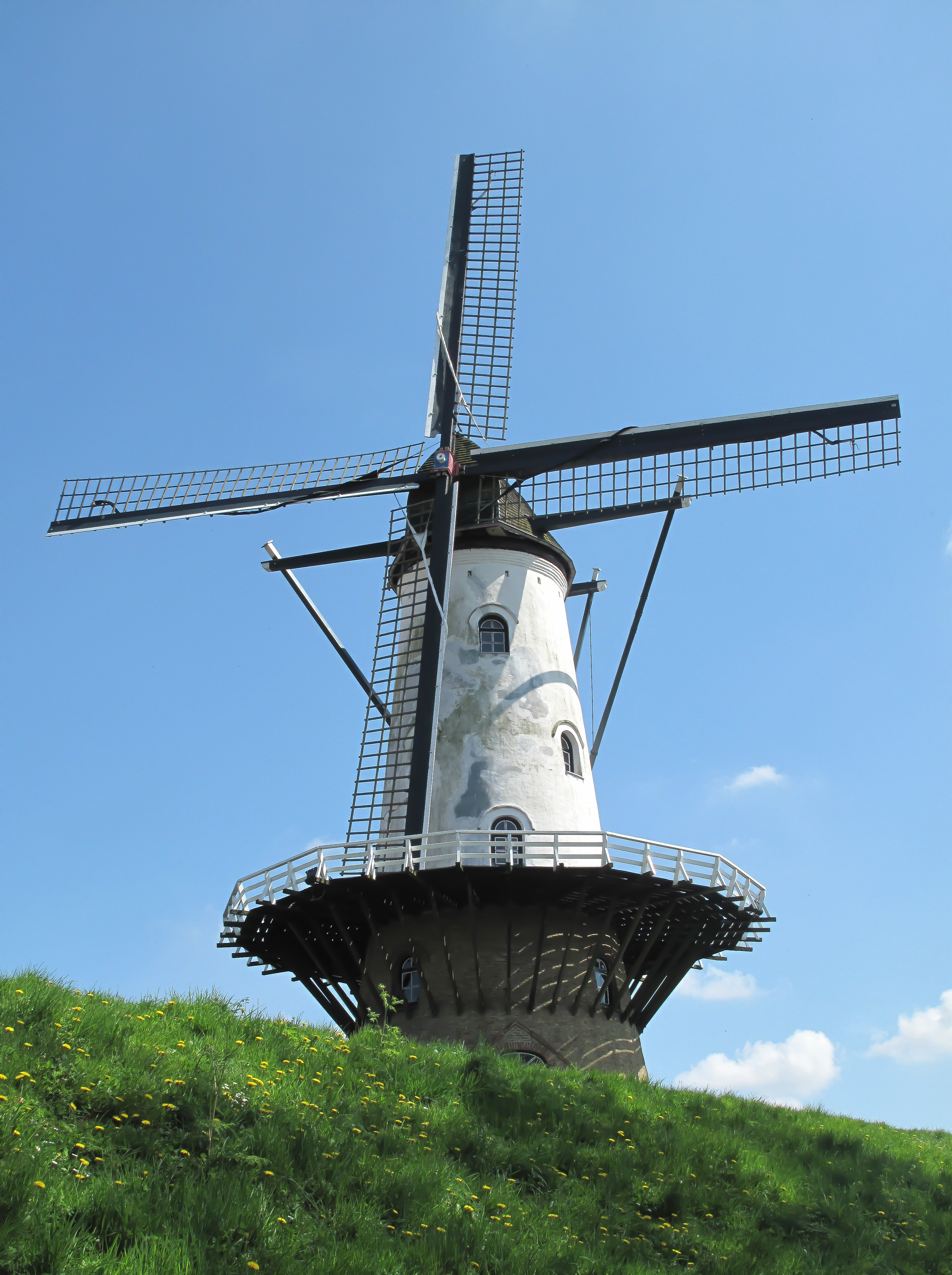
Windmill: de Witte Juffer

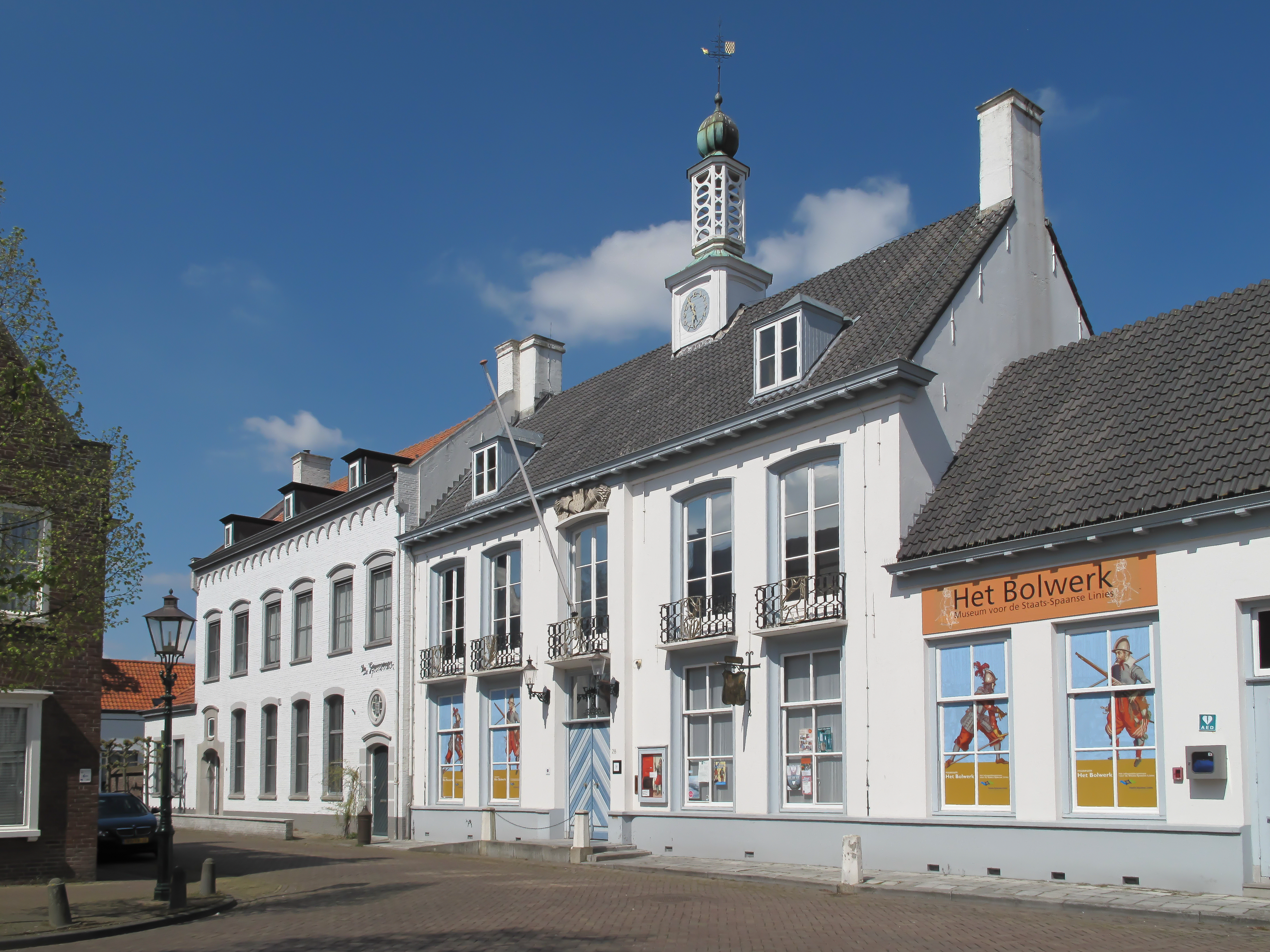
Museum
