= Marlies Somers =

Dutch voice actress

- Born: January 16, 1973 (age 53); Gouda, Netherlands
- Occupation: Voice actress
- Children: 3
- Relatives: Hans Somers (brother)

Marlies Somers (born 16 January 1973) is a Dutch voice actress who has been voice-dubbing roles in the Dutch language for many foreign media. In some series she is the title character. She was born in Gouda. She has a daughter and two sons, and a younger brother, Hans Somers.

== Dubbing roles ==
Animation

- Winx Club - Layla
- Monster Buster Club - Cathy
- Bratz Rock Angelz - Cloe
- Bratz Starrin & Stylin - Cloe
- The Powerpuff Girls - Bubbles and Princess Morbucks (1999), Bubbles (2016)
- Ed, Edd n Eddy - Sarah
- The Care Bears - Funshine Bear
- Rugrats - Zoey
- The Fairly OddParents - Vicky
- Fanboy & Chum Chum - Marsha
- Dora the Explorer - Benny the Bull
- Totally Spies! - Dominique
- Olivia - Olivia
- Toy Story 2 - Barbie
- Rocket Power - Otto Rocket
- Hey Arnold! - Lila Sawyer and Olga Pataki
- Polly World Movie - Polly Pocket
- The Ghost and Molly McGee - Molly McGee
- Green Eggs and Ham - Pam-I-Am

Anime

- Digimon Adventure - Angewomon, Gatomon, Kari Kamiya, T.K. Takaishi
- Pokémon 1997 - Misty
- Sailor Moon - Sailor Moon & Bunny Tsukino
- Sailor Moon R - Sailor Moon & Bunny Tsukino

Live-action

- Teletubbies - Po
- Sesame Street - Prairie Dawn
- Sesame Beginnings - "Prairie Dawn"
