= Liesbeth Messer-Heijbroek =

Dutch sculptor (1914–2007)

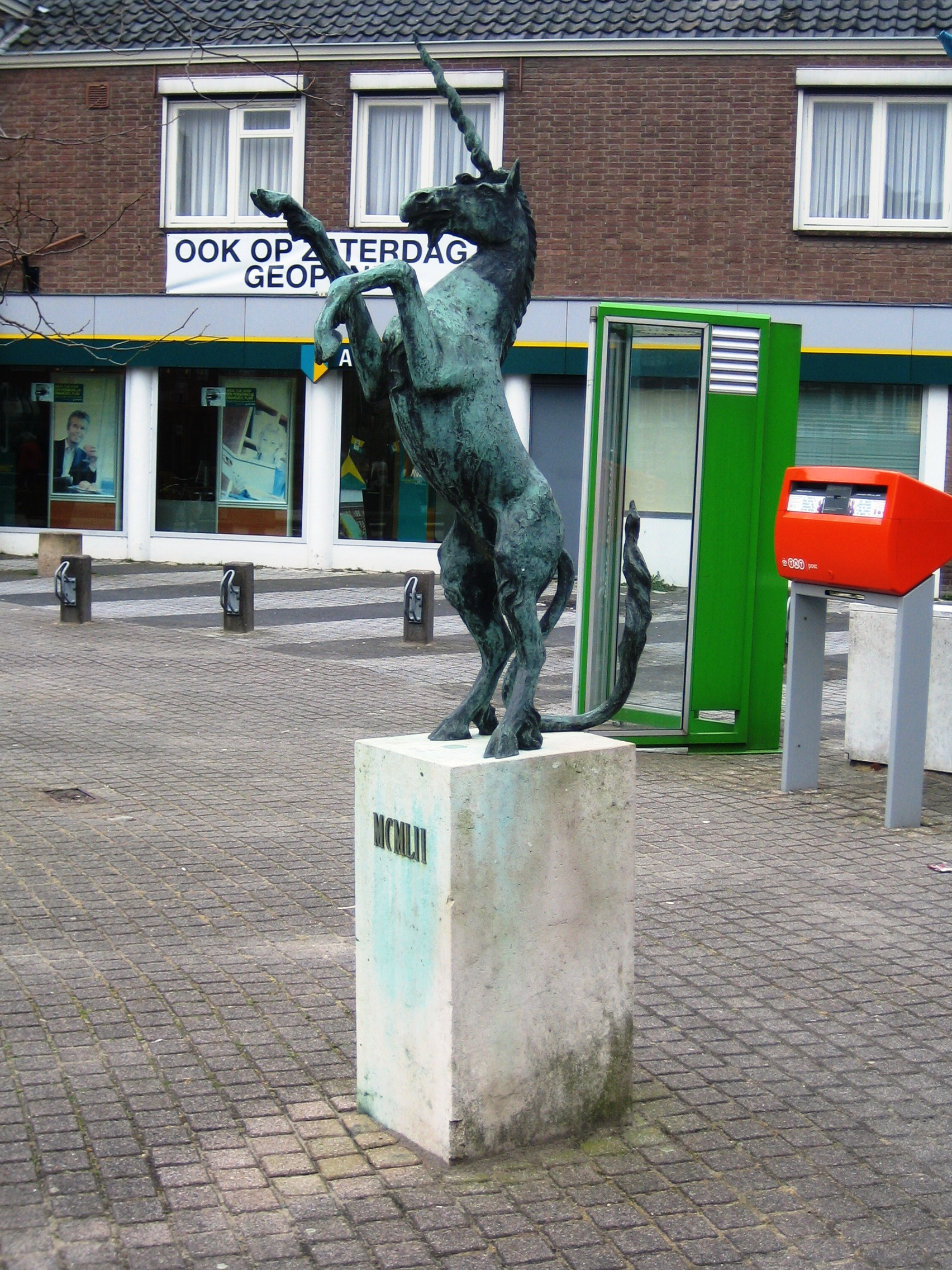
Eenhoorn (unicorn) in Oostburg

Liesbeth Messer-Heijbroek (Amsterdam, 25 April 1914 – Breda, 6 November 2007) was a Dutch sculptor and medal maker.

Born Liesbeth Heijbroek, she studied in the city of her birth at the Rijksakademie (National academy) under both Jan Bronner and Theo van Reijn. In 1940 she married an architect called Willem Messer and the couple settled in Zeeland, in the south-west of the country. The war memorial (1948) in the main cemetery at Domburg was a project shared between the two of them.

== Works on public display ==
Domburg

- 'Knielende vrouw' (kneeling woman), monument Second World War (1948), Algemene begraafplaats

Middelburg

- twee beeldengroepen (Two men : two women) (1956), Langevielebrug
- drie sporters (1960), bronzen gevelreliëf aan de Bachensteene (voormalige gymzaal)

Oostburg

- Monument: Second World War (1951), in the public cemetery in the old town
- Eenhoorn (Unicorn) (1952), Eenhoornplantsoen (Unicorn Square)
