= Marlies Mosiek-Müller =

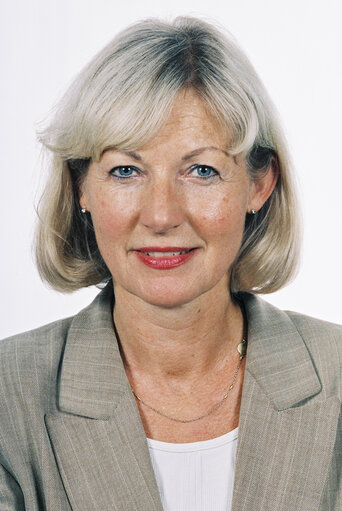
- Marlies Mosiek-Müller

Member of the European Parliament
- In office 19 July 1994 – 22 April 1999

Personal details
- Born: 9 August 1946 (age 80) Leipzig, Germany
- Party: Christian Democratic Union
- Other political affiliations: European People's Party

Marlies Mosiek-Müller (born 9 August 1946) is a German jurist and politician from the Christian Democratic Union. She was a member of the European Parliament and Minister for Social Affairs of the State of Hesse.

== Early life ==
Marlies Mosiek-Müller is married to Rolf Müller and has four adult children. Before entering politics, she was a lawyer and worked as a judge at the Federal Social Court in Kassel.

== Political career ==
Marlies Mosiek-Müller ran for the European Parliament in 1994, second on the CDU Hesse list, and served there from 1994 to 1999. She was deputy chair of the Committee on Rules of Procedure and the Committee on Legal Affairs and Civil Rights, as well as spokesperson for MEPs in the Economic Council in Brussels.

Following the CDU's election victory in the 1999 Hessian state election, Roland Koch appointed her to his cabinet as Minister for Social Affairs on 7 April 1999. She resigned from this post on 20 August 2001, for personal reasons. The reason was her impending divorce, which she considered incompatible with the duties of Minister for Family Affairs.

After her resignation, she joined Hertie-Stiftung as spokesperson for the management board (2001–2006). Since 2006, she has been a lecturer in copyright law at Hochschule Mittweida University of Applied Sciences, where she was elected chair of the university council in 2009. In March 2011, she was appointed honorary professor.

== Awards ==
- 2022: Hessian Order of Merit

== See also ==
- List of members of the European Parliament for Germany, 1994–1999
