= Oostburg =

City in the Netherlands

- The Burg
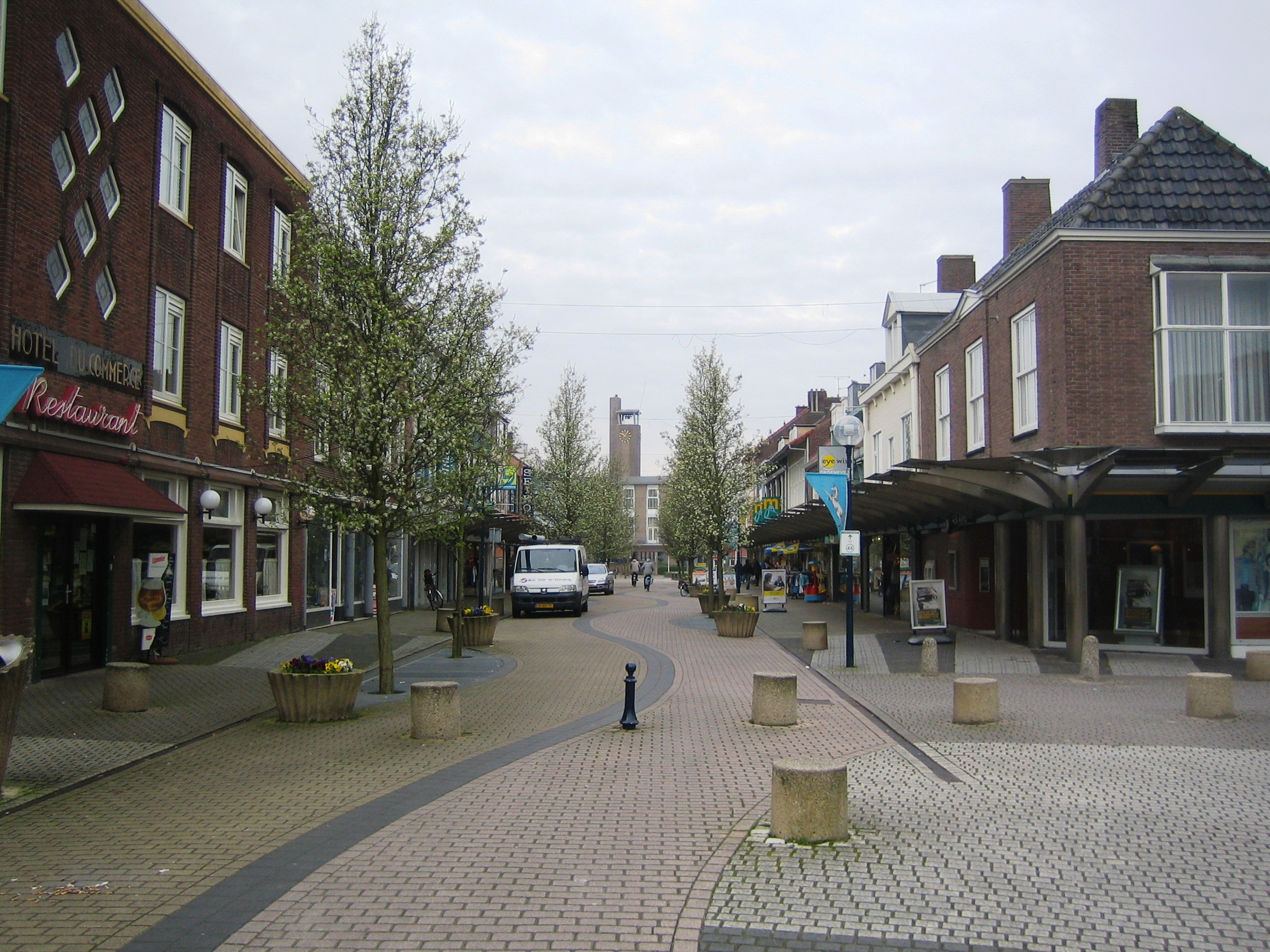
- Main street

- Flag Coat of arms

- Location in the province of Zeeland in the Netherlands Oostburg (Netherlands)
- Coordinates: 51°19′35″N 3°29′35″E
- Country: Netherlands
- Province: Zeeland
- Municipality: Sluis

Area
  - Total: 26.54 km^{2} (10.25 sq mi)
- Elevation: 1.4 m (4.6 ft)

Population (2021)
  - Total: 4,650
  - Density: 175/km^{2} (454/sq mi)
- Time zone: UTC+1 (CET)
  - Summer (DST): UTC+2 (CEST)
- Postal code: 4501
- Dialing code: 0117
- Website: www.oostburg.nl (in Dutch)

Oostburg (Zeelandic Flemish: Wòstburg) is a city in the south-western Netherlands. It is located in the municipality of Sluis, in the province of Zeeland. As of 1 January 2015, its population was 4731, down from 5008 in January 2005. It received city rights in 1237. Before 1 January 2003, Oostburg was also the name of a municipality. It merged with Sluis-Aardenburg to form the new municipality of Sluis. The municipality covered an area of 224.93 km^{2}, of which 1.05 km^{2} was water. As well as the town of Oostburg, the former municipality also included the following towns, villages and townships:

- Breskens
- Cadzand
- Groede
- Hoofdplaat
- IJzendijke
- Nieuwvliet
- Schoondijke
- Waterlandkerkje
- Zuidzande

Oostburg is a tourist town very close to the beaches at Cadzand. Wednesday is market day and in the summer the city is busy with many events.

== The unicorn ==
Oostburg's symbol is the unicorn, from which the townsfolk are said to derive strength and courage. The unicorn is represented by a sculpture produced by artist Liesbeth Messer-Heijbroek who for many years, with her husband, lived in the area: she evidently took inspiration from the name of a former inn. The sculpture has been repositioned at least once since it first appeared in 1952 during the postwar reconstruction: at one stage it adorned a small car park. It shares with a modern fountain a spot in "Eenhoornplantsoen" (Unicorn Place) beyond the northern end of the old market square in the town centre.

== World War II Monument ==
During the Second World War, approximately 140 Oostburg townsfolk died and most of all the buildings, shops and churches were destroyed. This monument is a tribute to them and the rebuilding of the town. Around the lower part of the monument are the names of those who perished.

== Gallery ==
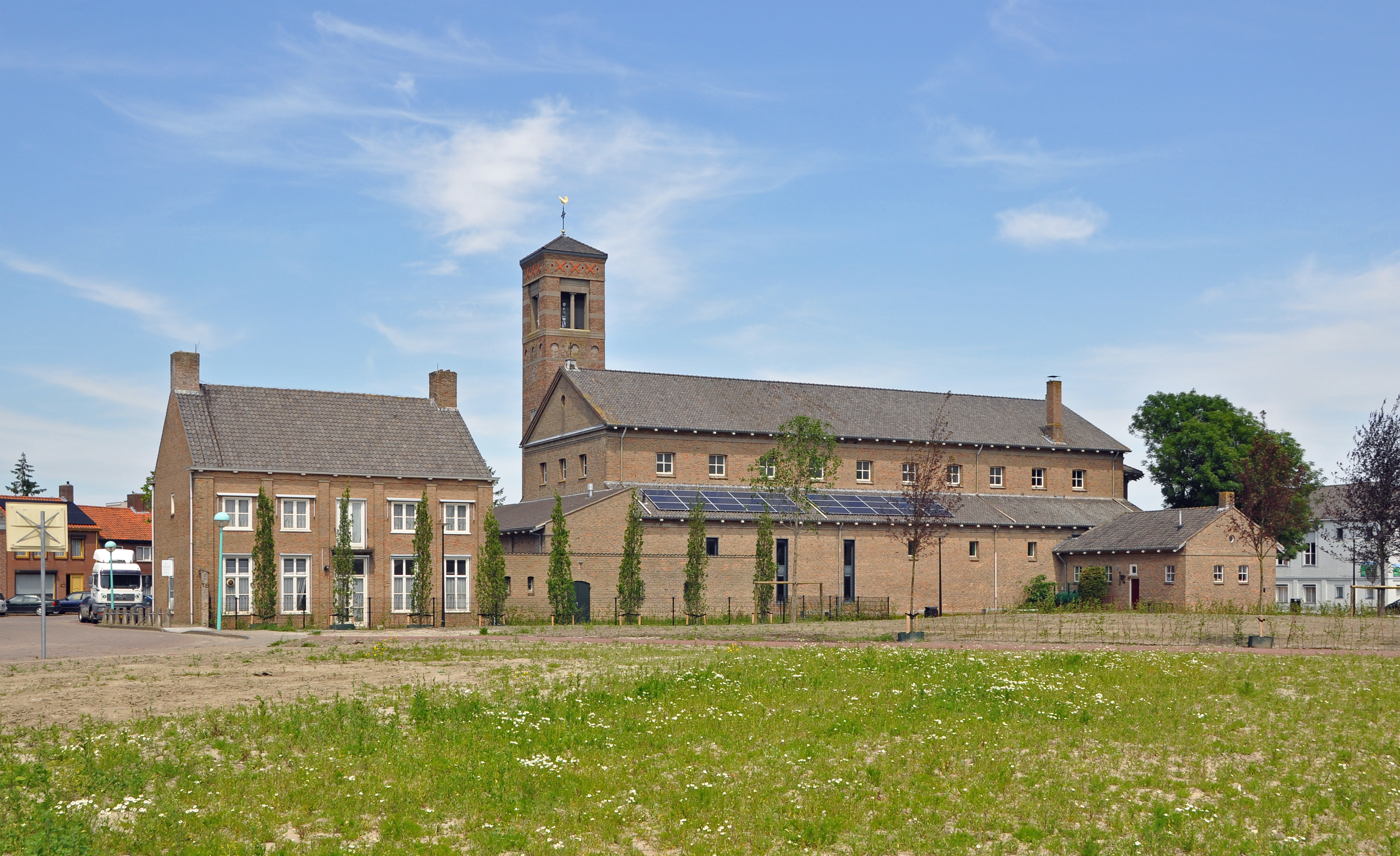
St Eligius Church

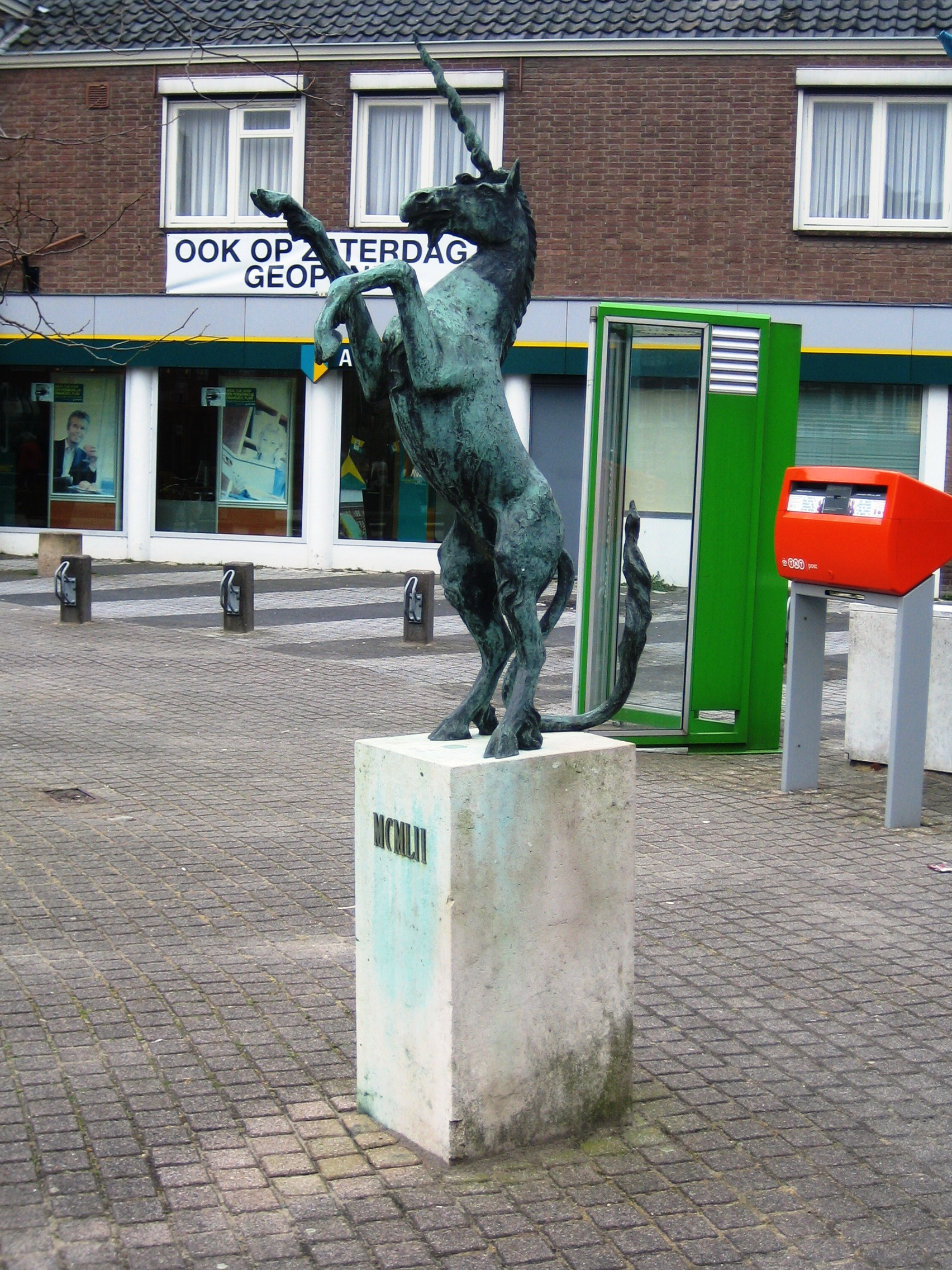
Oostburg unicorn

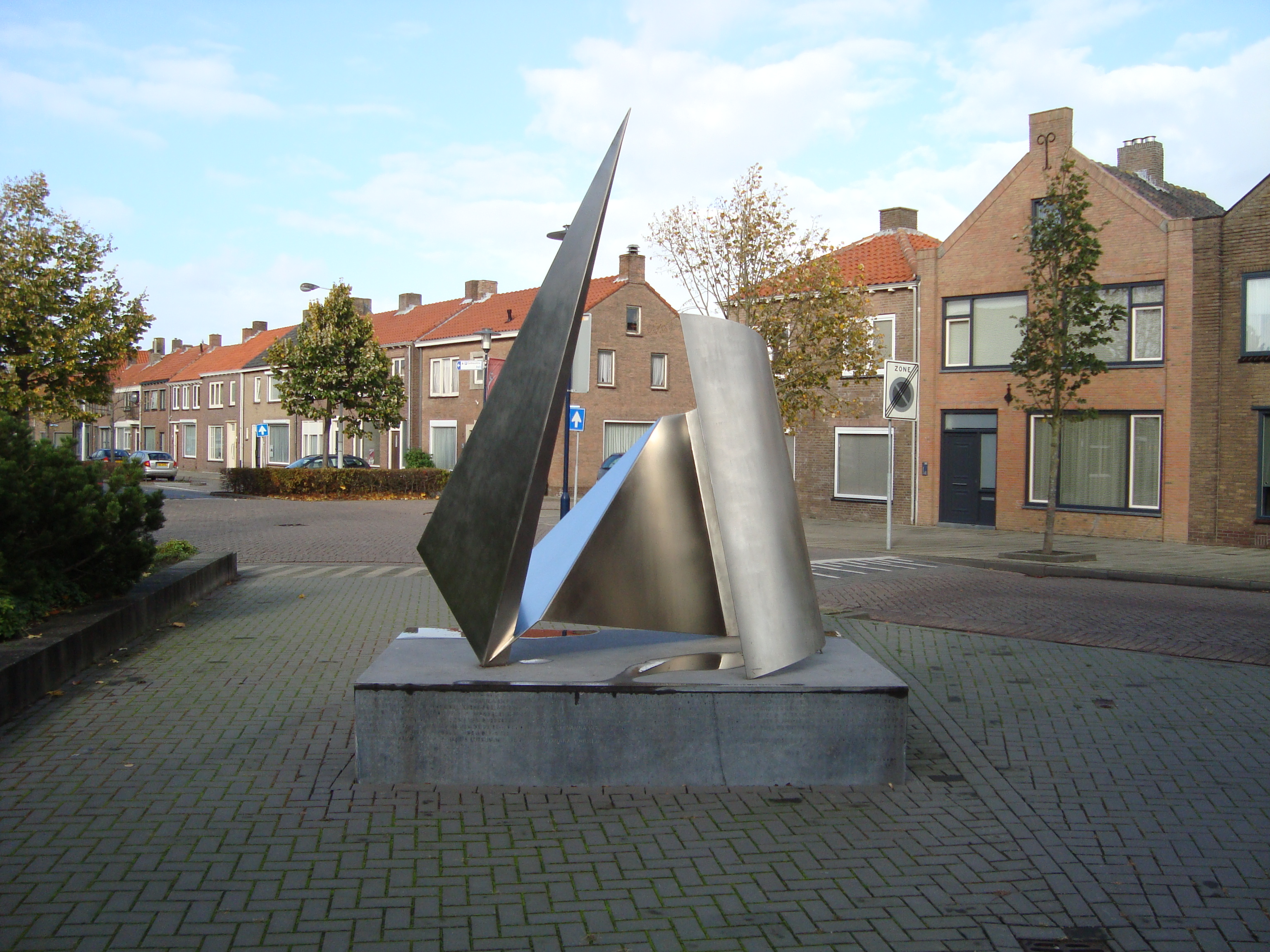
World War II memorial

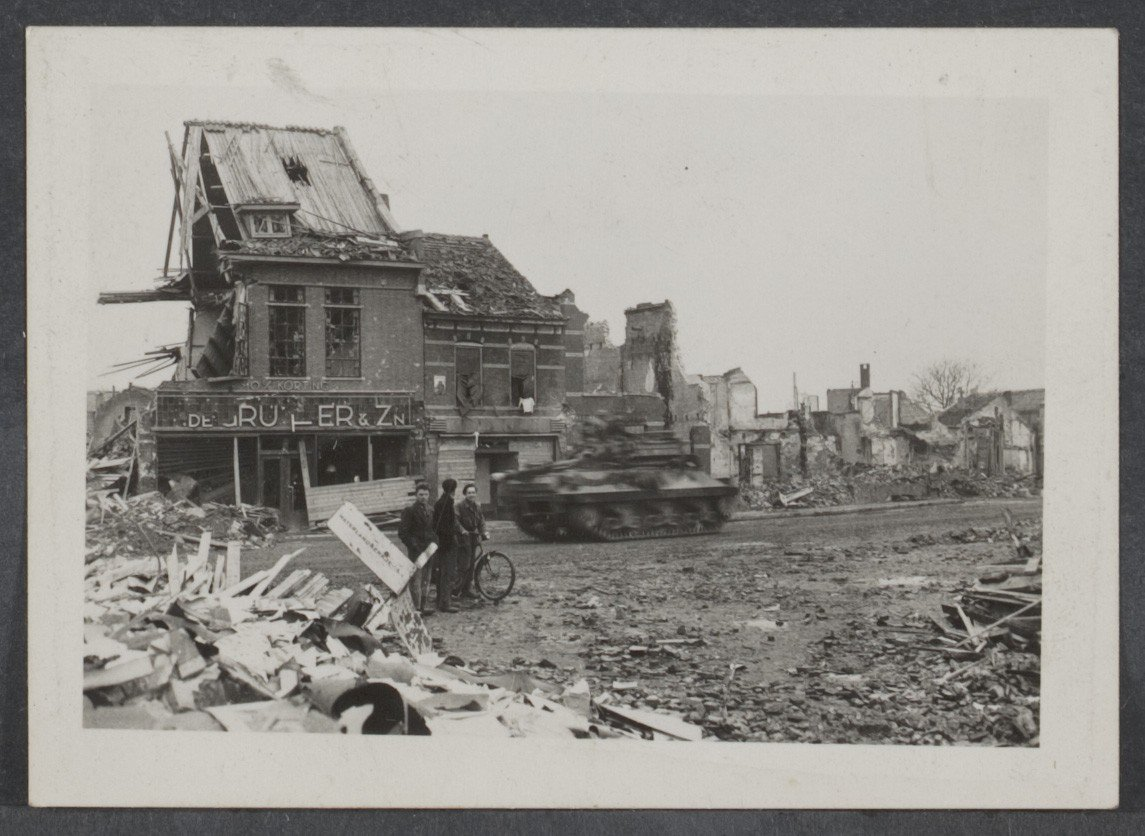
Oostburg in 1944
