= Liesbeth Van Impe =

Belgian journalist (born 1977)

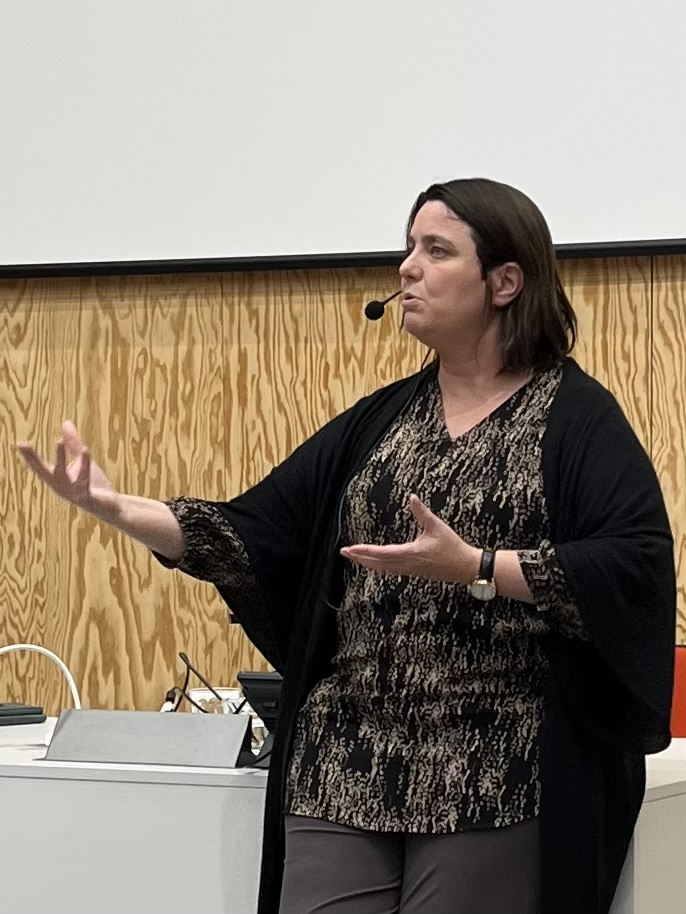
- Liesbeth Van Impe in 2023
- Born: 20 April 1977 (age 49); Roeselare, Belgium
- Citizenship: Belgium
- Education: Romance languages and literature, Katholieke Universiteit Leuven
- Title: Contributing editor, Journalist

Liesbeth Van Impe (born 20 April 1977) is a Belgian journalist and contributing editor.

== Biography ==
Van Impe studied Romance languages and literature at KU Leuven, where she graduated in 2000 with a thesis about the Algerian War. After her studies, she went traveling for a while. Next, she started working at Universiteit Vrije Tijd of the Davidsfonds.

In 2004, she made her journalistic debut at De Morgen. When the newspaper restructured in 2009, she was part of the discussions between the contributing editors and the editors-in-chief as a union member. In June 2009, she resigned as a result of people still being laid-off. Next, she started as 'chef politics' at Het Nieuwsblad. In November 2011, she became 'editor-in-chief of politics' at this newspaper. Finally, in November 2013, she became Editor-in-chief, together with Pascal Weiss, succeeding Guy Fransen.

Next to this, she is one of the five Flemish commentators who write 'Stoemp Flamand' in the French newspaper Le Soir and she makes contributions on a regular basis for Le Vif/L'Express, RTBF and RTL TVI. Finally, she has been a guest lecturer in 'political journalism' at the Erasmus Brussels University of Applied Sciences and Arts sinds 2009 and at the Katholieke Universiteit Leuven sinds 2015.

In 2020 she wrote the book Chemo day is the best day of the week (Dutch: Chemodag is de beste dag van de week). In this book she talks about her experiences as a Breast cancer patient.

In April 2021, she started the podcast Het Punt van Van Impe. In this podcast, she talks about the political news of the last week together with Jeroen Roppe .

In 2022, she participated in De Allerslimste Mens ter Wereld, a Belgian TV-show and got third place.

== Sources ==
- Voorstelling Liesbeth Van Impe; Read my lips
- Wie is Liesbeth Van Impe?; De Morgen; 15 maart 2013
- STEYAERT Katrien; Leven na Leuven: Liesbeth Van Impe, romanist en politiek hoofdredacteur 'Het Nieuwsblad'; Campuskrant KU Leuven; 30 April 2013
- Profiel Liesbeth Van Impe; LinkedIn
- Beknopte biografie Liesbeth Van Impe; VUB
