= Marliese Echner-Klingmann =

German poet and playwright (1937–2020)

- Born: Marie-Elisabeth Echner; 26 January 1937 Heidelberg, Germany
- Died: 16 November 2020 (aged 83)
- Occupation: Poet, playwright
- Children: 2

Marliese Echner-Klingmann (26 January 1937 – 16 November 2020) was a German poet and playwright.

== Biography ==
Born as Marie-Elisabeth Echner in Heidelberg, Echner-Klingmann grew up in Eschelbronn. She worked as an office administration clerk until her marriage in 1959. She had two children: Her son Michael, born in 1961 and her daughter Christiane, born in 1964.

She began writing at the middle of the 1960s. In 1988, Echner-Klingmann founded the acting-group "Sellemols" in Eschelbronn. She died at 16 November 2020 and is buried at the Cemetery of Eschelbronn.

== Awards and honours ==
In 2008, she was awarded the de:Heimatmedaille des Landes Baden-Württemberg:Heimatmedaille des Landes Baden-Württemberg.

== Bibliography ==
=== Fiction ===
- with Ilse Rohnacher: Stoppelfelder streichle. Mundartgedichte. Pfälzische Verlagsanstalt, Landau, 1984
- with Ilse Rohnacher: Du un ich. Mundartgedichte. Heidelberger Verlagsanstalt, Heidelberg, 1988
- with Ilse Rohnacher: Blädderraschle Mundartgedichte. C. Winter, Heidelberg, 1996
- Dorfgeschichten in Mundart und Schriftdeutsch. Info-Verlag, Karlsruhe, 2004
- Kraichgauer Wortschatz. Wörter und Wendungen aus dem Östlichen Kraichgau. Hrsg. vom Heimatverein Kraichgau Eppingen, Druckerei Odenwälder, Buchen, 2001

=== Plays ===
- Sellemols. Vom Leineweber- zum Schreinerdorf (1989)
- Veronika Seyfert (1993)
- Aus der Lisbeth ihrm Tagebuch. E Dorf em Kraichgau vun 1939 bis 1945 (1996)
- S Leewe geht weiter - E Dorf em Kraichgau vun 1945 bis 1954 (2002)
- Zuzenhausen, ein Dorf an der Elsenz (2004)
- Dorfleewe, wud Groußeltern noch Kinner ware (2008)
