= Marlies ter Borg =

Dutch philosopher, editor and author

Marlies ter Borg-Neervoort (born 24 December 1948, Pladjoe, Palembang) is a Dutch philosopher, editor and author. Her work focuses principally on the study of texts in the Bible and Qu'ran. She is the author of Koran en Bijbel in Verhalen (Qu'ran and Bible in Stories) and Sharing Mary: Bible and Qu'ran side by side. Both works focus on comparative textual analysis in both holy books.
