= Baudouin of Burgundy =

Natural son of Philip III, Duke of Burgundy (1445–1508)

Baudouin de Bourgogne
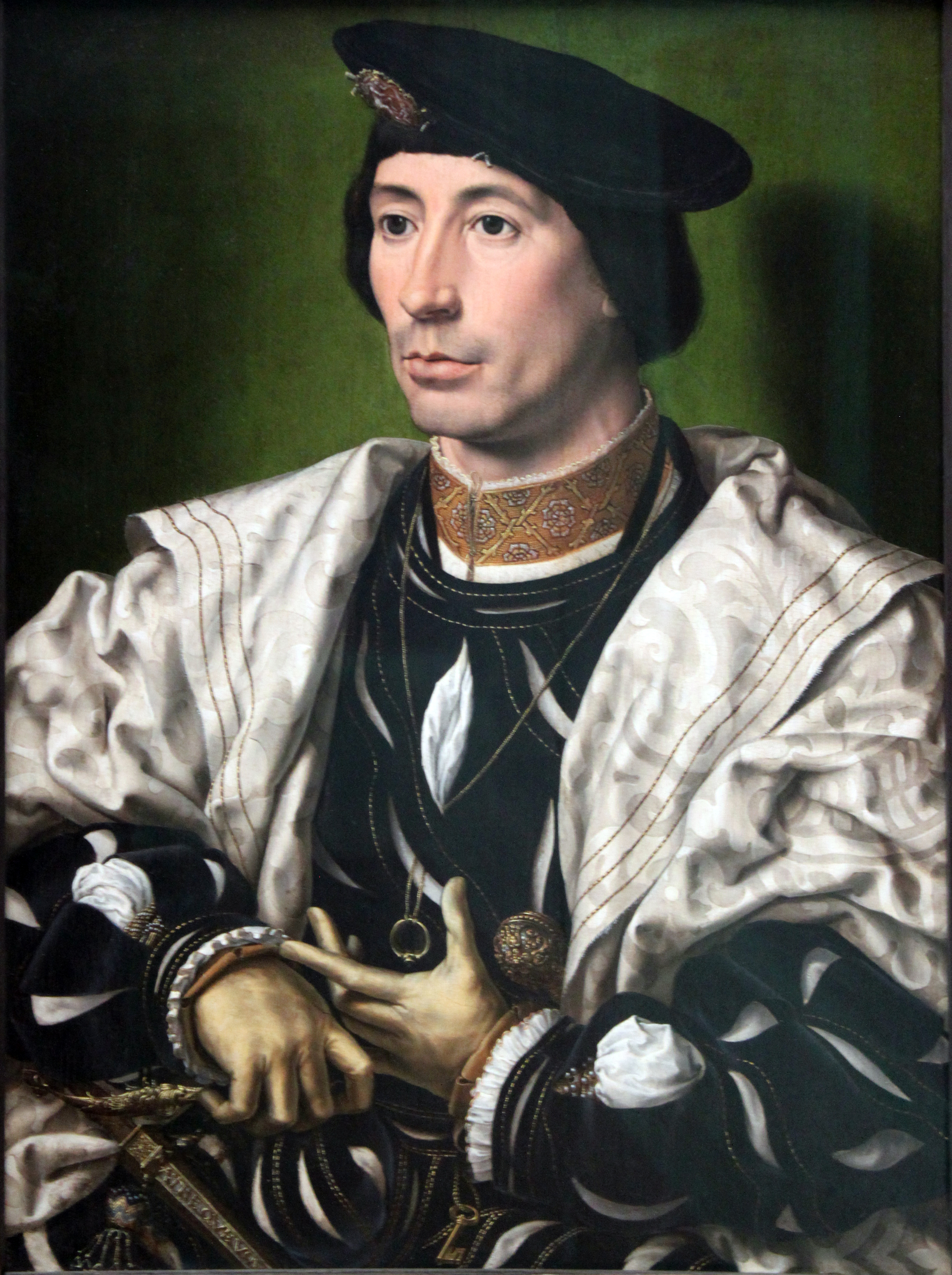
- Portrait, possibly of Baudouin, by Jan Gossaert
- Born: 1445; Lille, Burgundy
- Died: May 1508 (aged 62–63); Brussels
- Spouse: Marina Manuel de Villena
- House: Valois-Burgundy
- Father: Philip the Good
- Mother: Catharina de Tiesferies
- Religion: Roman Catholicism

Baudouin of Burgundy, Lord of Fallais (French: Baudouin de Bourgogne) (1445 – May 1508) was a Burgundian nobleman who was an illegitimate son of Philip the Good, Duke of Burgundy.

== Early life ==
Coat of arms of Baudouin de Bourgogne

Baudouin was born in 1445 in Lille. He was one of, at least, eighteen illegitimate children of Philip the Good, Duke of Burgundy (1396–1467). His mother was Catharina de Tiesferies (b. c. 1425), (Note: His mother is sometimes referred to as Catharina de Thieffries.) who was one of twenty-four documented mistresses of Philip. Among his many half-siblings were Cornille, bastard of Burgundy, Lord of Beveren, known as "le Grand Bâtard de Bourgogne" (the Great Bastard of Burgundy), Governor-general of Luxembourg; Anthony, bastard of Burgundy, Count of La Roche, Lord of Beveren who became known as "le Grand Bâtard de Bourgogne" after the death of their older half-brother and was their father's favourite; David of Burgundy, Prince-Bishop of Utrecht; Anne of Burgundy, governess of their niece, Mary, suo jure Duchess of Burgundy (daughter of their legitimate half-brother Charles), she married Adriaan van Borselen, Lord of Brigdamme and her cousin Adolph of Cleves, Lord of Ravenstein; Raphael of Burgundy, Abbot of Saint Bavo's Abbey and titular bishop of Rhosus; and Philip of Burgundy, Prince-Bishop of Utrecht, Admiral of the Netherlands.

His paternal grandparents were John the Fearless, a scion of the French royal family who ruled the Burgundian State from 1404 until his assassination in 1419, (Note: His paternal grandfather, John the Fearless, a grandson of John II, King of France, played a key role in French national affairs during the early 15th century, particularly in his struggle to remove his first cousin once removed, the mentally ill King Charles VI and during the Hundred Years' War against the Kingdom of England. A rash, ruthless and unscrupulous politician, John murdered Charles's brother, the Duke of Orléans, in an attempt to gain control of the government, which led to the eruption of the Armagnac–Burgundian Civil War in France and in turn culminated in his own assassination in 1419.) and Margaret of Bavaria (a daughter of Albert I, Duke of Bavaria). His maternal grandparents were Martin de Tiesferies and Richarde de Le Planque (a daughter of Adrien des Planque).

== Career ==
Shortly after his birth, his father granted him and his mother the Lordship of La Rondrie (near Hem), but only for their lifetimes. His father, however, was generous towards him, giving him additional lands on 14 February 1464, including the Flemish Lordships of Lovendegem and Zomergem (now Lievegem), confiscated two years earlier from Jean Coustain.

=== Dukes of Burgundy (1464–1470) ===
Despite their age difference, Baudouin was close to his elder half-brother, Anthony, bastard of Burgundy, who was his father's favourite, whom he accompanied on an attempted crusade against the Turks, between May 1464 and February 1465. The Flemish fleet, departing from Sluis, reached Marseille after lifting the Siege of Ceuta, but the expedition stopped there because of a plague epidemic and the death of Pope Pius II, promoter of the crusade.

It was also under Anthony's command, first in the rear guard and then in the vanguard of the army of their half-brother Charles the Bold, that Baudouin took part in the War of the Public Weal in 1465, and then in the Wars of Liège. During this latter conflict, he participated in the capture of Dinant in August 1466, commands a cavalry charge at Brustem in October 1467, and was among those responsible for the sacking of Liège in October 1468.

=== Louis XI (1470–1475) ===
In 1470, Baldwin fled the ducal court and entered the service of the King of France, Louis XI. While Charles the Bold accused him of conspiring against him, Baudouin justified his flight by claiming to have been the victim of sexual harassment by his powerful half-brother. As a reward for his services, the "Universal Spider" granted him the Viscounty of Orbec. However, this Lordship never came into his possession due to the reluctance of the Parlement of Paris and the sitting Viscount, Jean Baudouin.

On 13 September 1475, the King of France and the Duke of Burgundy concluded the Truce of Soleuvre. While it excluded Baudouin (as well as Philippe de Commines, Philip of Croÿ-Renty, and the former chamberlain Jean de Chassa) from any ducal clemency. Negotiations for a pardon were, however, already underway and resulted in Baudouin's return to his half-brother in January 1476.

=== Charles the Bold (1476–1477) ===
Having returned to the Duke's service, he also reunited with Anthony and fought alongside him in the vanguard of the Burgundian Army at the Battle of Grandson on 2 March 1476.

On 5 January 1477 of the following year, the brothers took part in the Battle of Nancy, during which the Duke was killed while his half-brothers were taken prisoner. Their defeat marked the end of the Burgundian Wars and the dissolution of the Burgundian State.

=== Habsburgs (1477–1508) ===
While Baudouin was held captive in the Château de Vincennes, he attempted to escape before being recaptured by Pierre de Rohan-Gié, Lord of Rohan, known as the Marshal of Gié. During this forced stay in France, Louis XI seems to have tried to bring him back into his service by granting him an annuity and the Barony of Bagnols-sur-Cèze in 1479.

Despite these royal favors, Baudouin preferred to loyally serve his niece Mary of Burgundy, or rather her husband, Emperor Maximilian, and later their son Philip the Handsome. Appointed Captain of the Château de Lille, he led part of the Imperial troops sent by Maximilian against the French during the War of Brittany from July to August 1487.

As Maximilian's chamberlain, Baudouin carried out several diplomatic missions for the Emperor. Besides his active role in the marriage of Philip the Handsome and Joanna of Castile (daughter of Ferdinand II of Aragon and Isabella I of Castile), he participated in negotiations between Maximilian and the cities of the Netherlands during the uprising in part of that territory. He thus worked towards the Peace of Daenebroeck with Leuven and Brussels on 14 August 1489. In November 1490, he was one of Maximilian's three spokesmen to the Estates of Hainaut to request military aid against Bruges. The peace signed between the Emperor and Philip of Cleves on 12 October 1492, also resulted from negotiations in which Baudouin took an important part. In September 1507, he took part in the defense of Leuven against Robert II de la Marck and the Duke of Guelders.

Between 1490 and 1500, Baudouin obtained the Lordship of Baudour and of Peer. In 1501, Baudouin was gifted the Brabant Lordship of Fallais, including Baarland Castle in Baarland by Archduke Maximilian. Fallais had been given to Archduke Maximilian by Jeanne van Borselen, Lady of Fallais (the fourth daughter of Wolfert VI of Borselen) and her husband, Wolfgang von Polheim. Further north, Baudouin was also Lord of Bredam and Sommelsdijk and also owned lands in Sint-Annaland, inherited from his half-sister, Anne of Burgundy.

Fallais later passed to his grand-nephew, Adolf of Burgundy (the son of Anna van Borselen, Jeanne's elder sister, and Philip of Burgundy-Beveren). (Note: Philip of Burgundy-Beveren was the son of his father's favourite Anthony, bastard of Burgundy (1421–1504).)

== Personal life ==
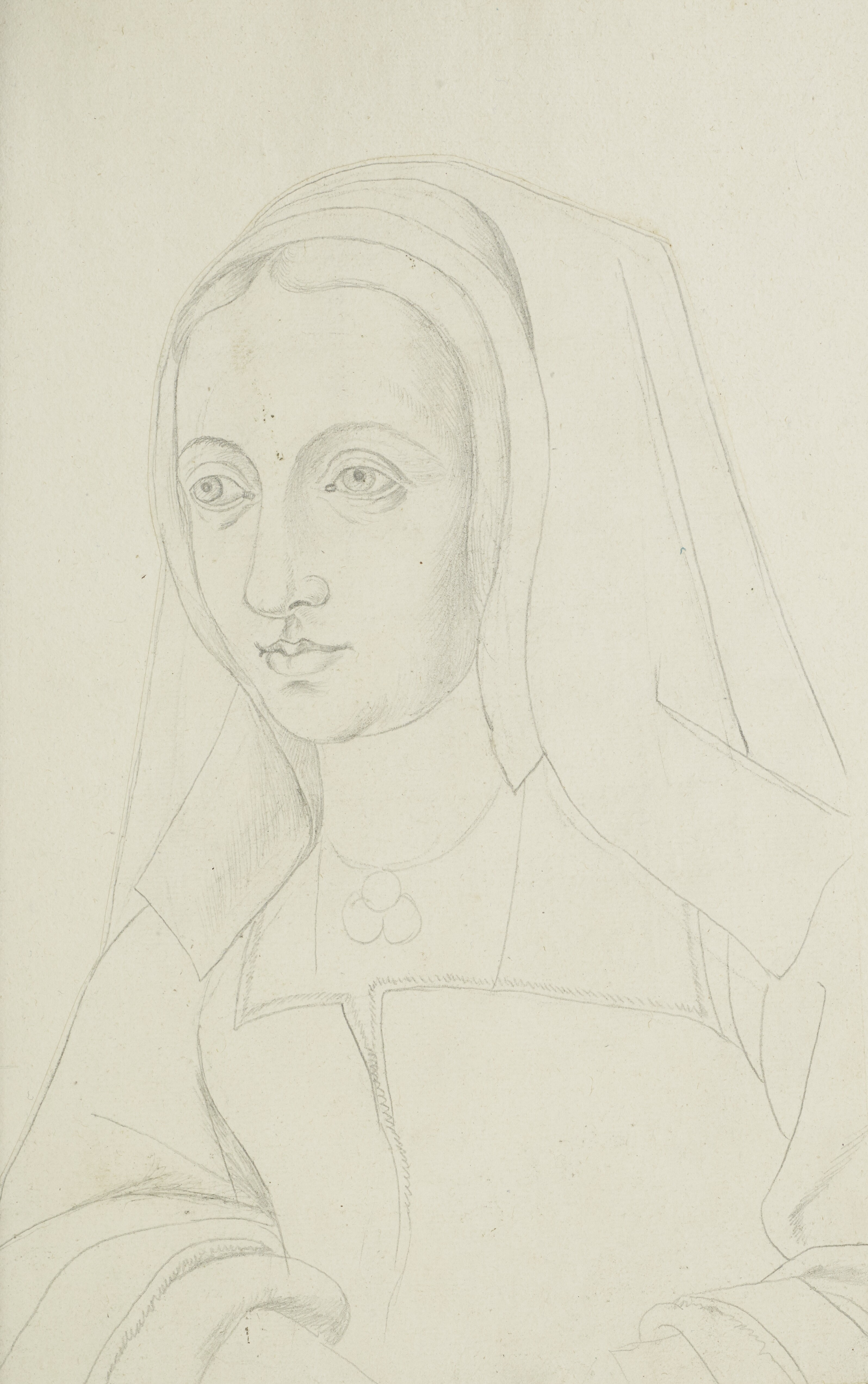
Portrait of his wife, Marie Emanuel, by Netherlandish artist Jacques Le Boucq in the Recueil d'Arras, before 1573

In c. 1488, Baudouin was married to Castilian noblewoman Maria "Marina" Manuel de Villena (1468–1500), a daughter of Juan Manuel de la Cerda, Lord of Belmonte and Juana Aldonce de Figueroa (a daughter of Don Lorenzo II Suárez de Figueroa, 1st Count of Feria). (Note: Juana's brother, Gómez Suárez de Figueroa, 2nd Count of Feria, was the grandfather of Gómez Suárez de Figueroa y Córdoba, 1st Duke of Feria.) She was the sister of Juan Manuel de Villena, Lord of Belmonte. Before her death, they were the parents of at least six children, including:

- Philippe of Burgundy (d. 1541)
- Charles of Burgundy, Heer van Bredam (1491–1538), who married Marguerite de Barbançon de Werchin, a daughter of Nicolas de Barbançon, Lord of Werchin, and Yolande de Luxembourg (a daughter of Jacques de Luxembourg, Seigneur de Richebourg).
- Maximilien of Burgundy (d. 1534)
- Madeleine of Burgundy (1489–1511), who married Philippe I de Lannoy, Lord of Molembais, the Grand Huntsman of Brabant who was a grandson of Baudouin de Lannoy, in 1509.

Baudouin died in May 1508 in Brussels and was buried at Fallais.

=== Illegitimate children ===
Like his father before him, Baudouin also had a number of illegitimate children with a number of mistresses. With Moeder van Jean Baudouin de Bourgogne. Together, they were the parents of:

- Jean Baudouin, bastard of Burgundy, who assumed the viscounty of Orbec.

With Catherine d'Ayelle, he had:

- Marie, bastard of Burgundy (d. 1567), who married Guillaume V de Vergy, Baron of Champlitte, a son of Guillaume IV, Lord of Vergy and Anne de Rochechouart.

With Catherine Jacqueline van Gavere (1477–1558), he had:

- François, bastard of Burgundy, Heer van Nieuwerve (d. c. 1563), who married Jeanne de Châlon, an illegitimate daughter of Philibert of Chalon, the last Prince of Orange from the House of Chalon.
- Barbe, bastard of Burgundy
- Baudouin, bastard of Burgundy

=== Descendants ===
Through his eldest son Charles, he was a grandfather of Jacques de Bourgogne, a prominent initial supporter of John Calvin who is known for his letter L'Excuse de Noble Seigneur Jacques de Bourgogne, Seigneur de Falais Et de Bredam; and Hélène de Bourgogne, who married Count Adrien de Lille, Lord of Fresnes (parents of Marguerite de Lille de Fresnes, who married Maximilien de Longueval, 1st Count of Bucquoy).

Through his illegitimate daughter Marie, he was a grandfather of François de Vergy, a page of honour to Emperor Charles V; he was Governor of the County of Burgundy and was created Count of Champlitte by letters patent on 5 September 1574 by King Philip II of Spain.
