= Baarland Castle =

Former castle in Baarland, Netherlands

- Slot Baarland
- Baarland, the Netherlands
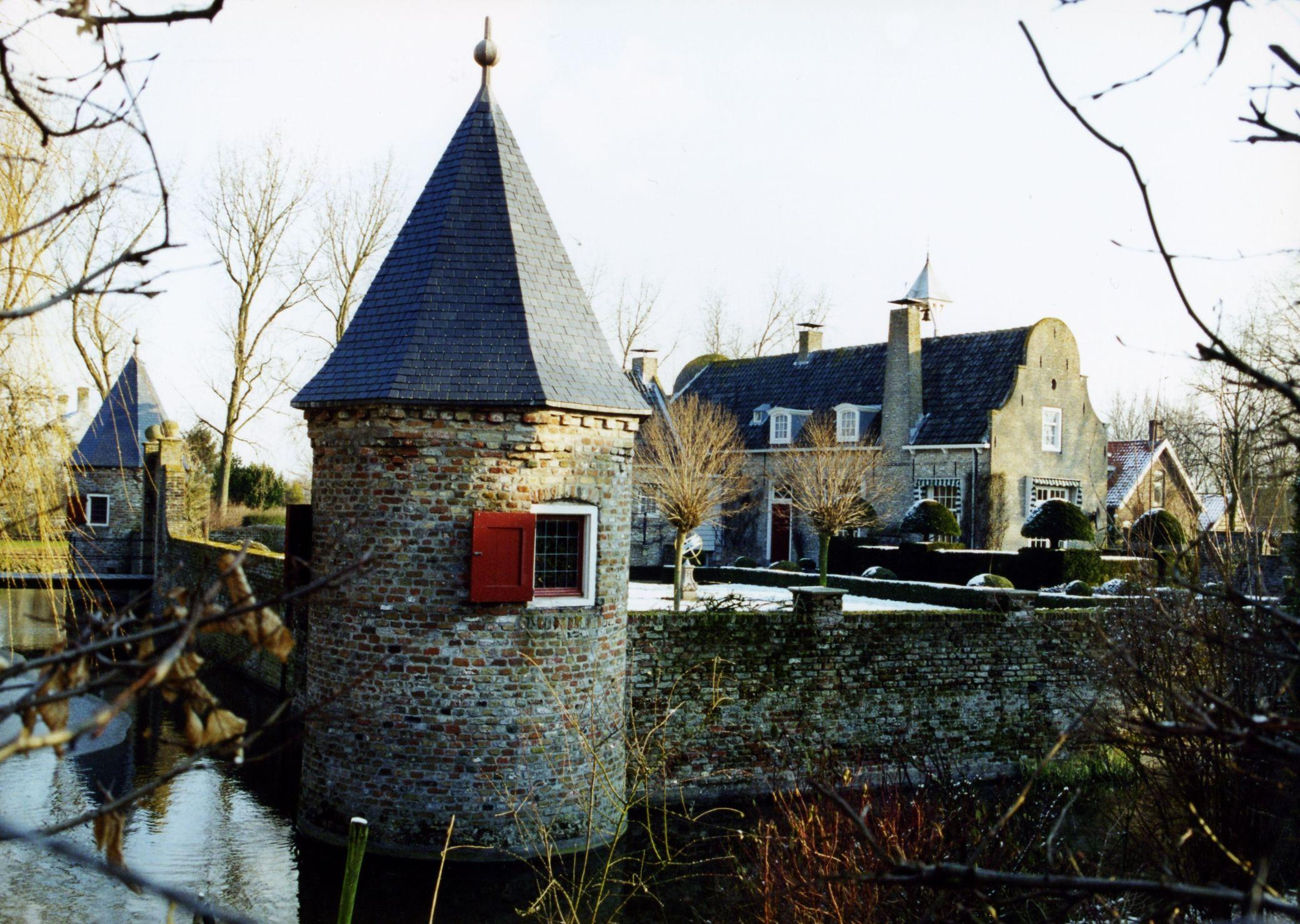
- Baarland Castle

Site information
- Type: Water Castle
- Controlled by: private property

Location
- The Netherlands
- Location within Zeeland
- Coordinates: 51.408633°N 3.886885°E

Site history
- Built: 14th century
- Materials: brick
- Demolished: Main building of the castle in 1838.

Baarland Castle is a former castle in Baarland, Netherlands.

== Castle Characteristics ==
=== A supposed Motte Castle or tower house ===
On a 17th-century engraving, a motte is depicted next to the castle. It is therefore supposed that the first version of Baarland Castle was a motte-and-bailey castle. This might have stood north of the current castle, which was built on what might have been the outer bailey of the motte castle.

The motte theory seems to be supported by a protrusion on the north side of the moat on the cadastre map of 1819. However, this is too small for a motte. It might have been a small island for a tower house, which preceded the large water castle.

=== The medieval water castle ===
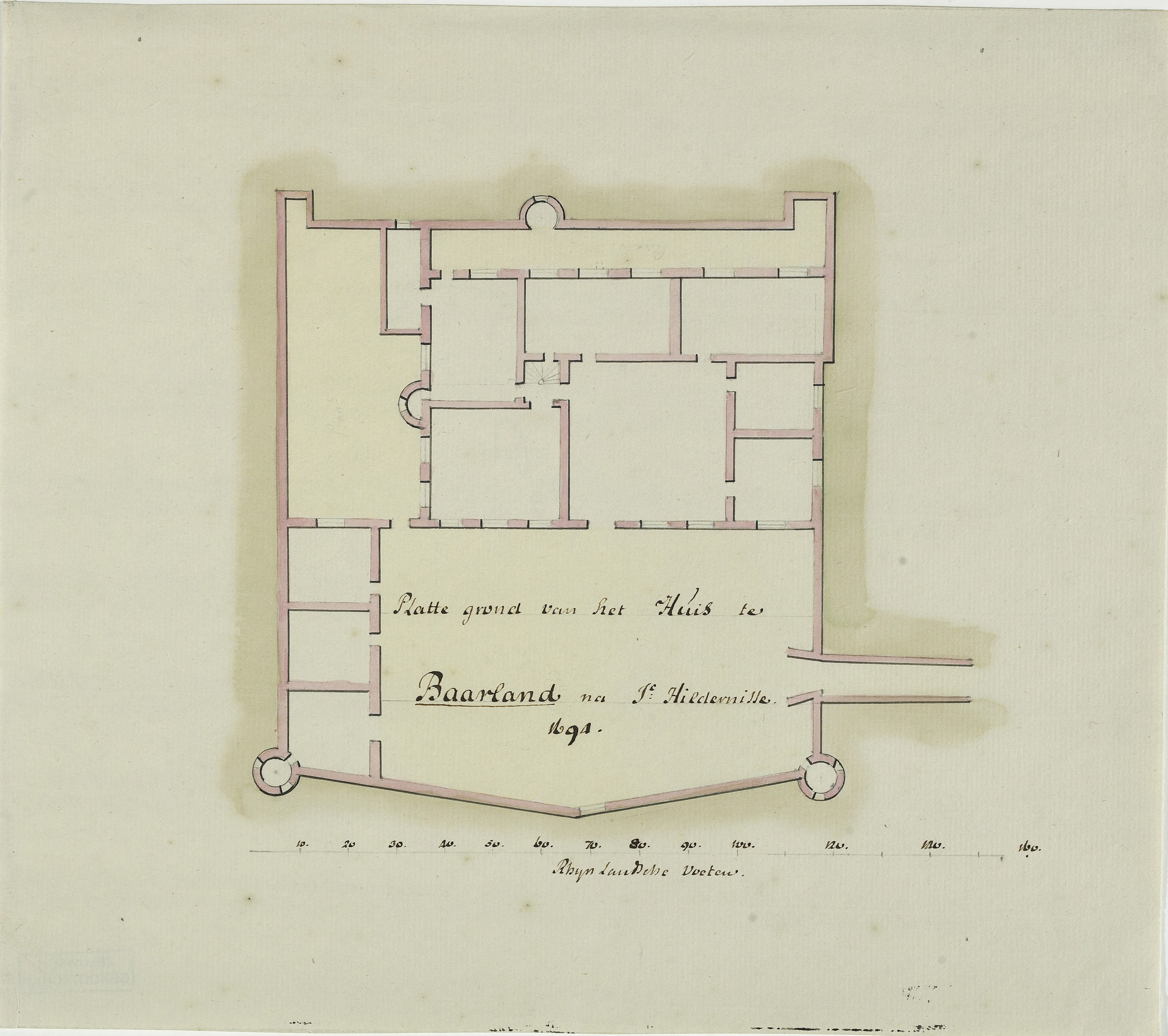
Hildernisse 1694 south top

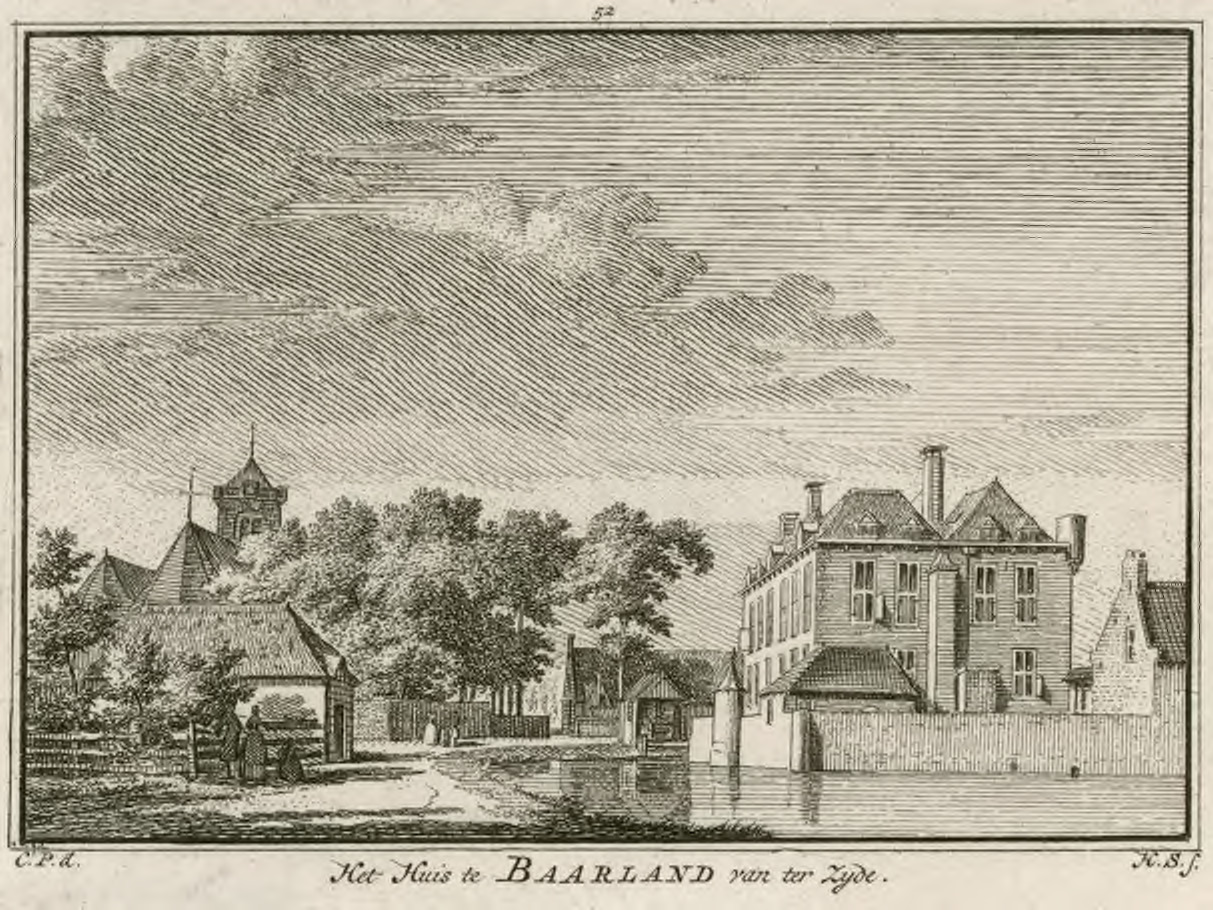
From the east in 1743.

The water castle which occupied the terrain of the current castle was probably built in the fourteenth century. The irregular form of the bailey and the buildings make it very likely that this construction also took place in phases. On at least three sides, later drawings show that by the 18th century, the façades had been heavily changed to give the impression of a single main building.

From several depictions we get an impression about what the castle looked like in the 17th and 18th centuries. Leading is the picture by Cornelis Pronk, who is known for being highly accurate. His drawing also has the advantage that it gives a recognizable depiction of the church of Baarland, from whence we know the direction that Pronk was looking to.

Isaac Hildernisse made a floor plan of Baarland Castle in 1694. This floor plan is in line with Pronk's later drawing. As such the two drawings confirm each other. However, what Hildernisse did not do, or the copyist of his work did not copy, was to take measurements of and or to accurately depict the walls. The floor plan gives all walls the same thickness, meaning that it is impossible to deduce a construction history from the floor plan. In this respect Pronk's work is also not helpful, because the outward façades had clearly been normalized when he depicted Baarland Castle.

Hildernisse is known for his tendency to depict all walls at 90 degree angles, unless he clearly could not do that. Not correctly showing the thickness of walls might be another trait of Hildernisse or his copyist. Sometimes Hildernisse accurately depicts the thickness of a wall, and sometimes he gives all the walls the same thickness, even while this was obviously not the case. The latter is proven by his floor plan of Moermond Castle.

Just before its demolition a new picture was drawn of the castle. Also, a very rough description was given. South and east of the main building there was a brick breastwork, the remains of the old ring wall. On the southwest corner was a tower, the remains of which were shown on the picture. The other walls were all gone at the time, and this also applied to the other guard towers.

The same description noted that at a height of 20 feet, the west and south walls of the main building were exceptionally thick. They were made of the oldest local brick that was relatively soft. The same applied to some of the inner walls. In 1838 the main building of the castle was demolished.

=== The current castle ===
The current castle consists of the main bailey of the second castle, surrounded by a wall and moat. The wall has been rebuilt on top of the old foundations, but to a much lower height. The towers on the wall are reconstructions at a lower height.

The current main building on the northeast corner is a former annex of the castle. It has two clock gables, and has been restored to its 17th-18th century condition. In about 1990 a new building was added at a 90 degree angle.

== History ==
=== Van Baarland ===
The oldest history of the castle is based on assumptions. In 1295 the Battle of Baarland was won by a pro-Holland Zeeland army against a Flanders army that had landed near Baarland. It is possible that any castle near Baarland was destroyed during the Flemish invasion. The Flemish were reported to have burned everything they could, both houses and churches.

In 1296 a Hugo van Baarland was involved in the killing of Floris V, Count of Holland. He was taken, and executed in Dordrecht. It is not known whether he was the head or heir of his family, and whether he owned Baarland Castle.

=== Van Borselen ===
In about 1840 it was supposed that Hugo van Baarland's estate was given to Aleid van Henegouwen, natural daughter of John II, Count of Holland. There was actually no prove for this assumption, but as Aleid had married Wolfert II van Borselen in 1312, it explained how the castle came into the possession of the Van Borselen family.

The last of the Van Borselen line was Wolfert VI of Borselen (c. 1433–1485). He had four surviving daughters. Anna van Borselen was the oldest and married Philip of Burgundy-Beveren, who succeeded as Lord of Veere etc. Second was Margaret, lady of Ridderkerk who married Walraven van Brederode. She wanted to succeed to the Lordship of Fallais, but did not get it. Maria was the third, and Jeanne was the youngest daughter.

Maria van Borselen was referred to as Lady of Baerlandt, or simply as Maria van Baerlandt. In 1489 she married Martin II von Polheim dit de Schoonenpoel (d. 1498). She died before having any children with Martin, who in 1493 remarried to Regina von Liechtenstein († 1496). Martin is said to have become the owner of Baarland and Der Nisse by this marriage. Later, Martin would get the margraviate of Steyr for life. It's therefore likely that he did not cling to Baarland, as it was too far away for him to effectively manage it.

Jeanne van Borselen, the fourth daughter married Wolfgang von Polheim, younger brother of Martin von Polheim. She became lady of Fallais on the death of her father. In 1501 Wolfgang and Jeanne gave Fallais back to Archduke Maximilian. In 1502 Falais was gifted to Baudouin de Bourgogne (c. 1446 – 1508) Lord of Fallais, Peer, Boudour, Sint-Annaland, Lovendegem, Zomergem en Fromont, bastard of Philip the Good.

=== Burgundy-Beveren ===
As Anna van Borselen had married Philip of Burgundy-Beveren, an important part of the Van Borselen goods came to their descendants. They had a son Adolf of Burgundy (1489–1540) and three daughters. Adolf became Lord of Veere and Admiral of the Netherlands. He was succeeded by his son Maximilian of Burgundy (1514–1558), who left Veere in heavy debt when he died.

Adolph de Bourgogne also had a bastard called Philippe de Bourgogne, Seigneur de Fontes or Fontaines. Philips was lord of Fontes, Linighem, etc. bailiff of Veere from 1533 to 1562. He died about 1566. He married Joan de Hesdin. They had 6 children. In 1567 these sold a house called Fontes in the Nonnenstraat in Mechelen. Anna of Burgundy was mentioned in the contract as: wife of Jacques Smit Lord of Baarland.

=== Van Baarland ===
Right up to the demolishment of the castle, the portrait of Jacob Smit hung above the fireplace in the middle room of the southern wing of the castle. He came into possession of Baarland Castle through the above marriage. He had been made bailiff of Vlissingen in 1558, and governor of Walcheren in 1572. He died in 1573. They left two daughters: Catherine or Jaqueline de Smidt dite de Bourgogne, and Maria van Baarland.

Jacqueline married Rombaut van Wachtendonck bailiff of Middelburg (1593-1603). They had Louis de Wachtendonck Lord of Baarland (b. 1600). Louis married Anne-Isabelle van Borselen, and had a daughter Sabine-Catherine van Wachtendonck, who still lived in 1660.

Jacob's daughter Maria married Emmerij van Liere, later governor of Willemstad. Their son Willem got a hunting lodge near Welsinge, which had belonged to Philippe de Bourgogne. He sold Welsinge in 1627.

The next lord of or in Baarland after Louis van Wachtendonck was another Jacob van Baarland, who was also called 'van Dirksland'. He probably belonged to the family of the Goes mayor Mattheus Michiels. In 1500 a Frederik van Baarland was mentioned. His descendants owned a significant part of the local ambachten (lordships). One son of Frederik was Michiel Mattheusse lord in Baarland, father of Mattheus Michiels mayor of Goes, lord of Baarland in 1584. The other son was Jan Mattheusse, father of Michiel, bailiff of South-Beveland from 1610 to 1629, and in turn father of Jan van Baarland, bailiff from 1629 to 1655. In 1634 Jan sold his part in the Lordship of Baarland to his nephew Jacob van Baarland.

This Jacob van Baarland, lord in Baarland, Dirksland and Wemeldingen was a staunch Catholic. He was born c. 1587 and still lived in 1669, in Antwerpen. He had two daughters: Catharina and Magdalena. These, and their father are referred to as 'De Smith van Baarland', which made it likely that they were nevertheless also family of the first Jacob Smit who got Baarland Castle.

Catharine van Baarland married Gerard van Groesbeek Lord van Hoemen, count of Groesbeek in 1638. Their son Jacob divided his grandparents estate with his aunt, and became owner of Baarland Castle. In 1730 a countess of Groesbeek lived at the castle. Magdalena married Philippe de Recourt dit de Licques, Baron of Wissekerke in 1655. He became Count of Rupelmonde in 1671.

=== Lampsins ===
In 1734 Baarland Castle was sold by the Counts of Groesbeek. The de Licques family also sold their part in the lordship, and so Baarland Castle and much of the surrounding land became owned by Johan Cornelis Lampsins (1716-1767). He had restored the castle by the mid 18th century, and actually went to live there.

In 1754 Baarland was bought by the Lord of Kerchem. His daughter Wilhelmina Elizabeth van Kerchem was registered as the owner of the 4334 gemeten 205 Rods lordship. She brought the castle in marriage to Hendrik van der Heim in Schiedam. Their daughter brought it to Cornelis Adrianus van Bol'es from Schiedam.

=== Demolishment ===
In September 1840 the demolishment of Baarland Castle was in progress. Marble fireplaces, windows, leather wall-paper, floor tiles, etc. were offered for sale. Cornelis Adrianus van Bol'es and Jacobus de Backer from Rotterdam still owned the terrain in 1844.

=== Hunting Lodge ===
In January 1855 Bol'es and De Backer sold Baarland for 65,835 guilders to Antonie van Hoboken (1807-1872) from Rotterdam. He turned it into a hunting lodge. In 1889 the Hobokens, ambachtsheren van Baarland were at their Slot Baarland.

=== Renovation ===
A. Feenstra from Hallum was the son of the local bicycle dealer. He moved to Vlissingen, where he and his wife had a radio a television shop. This was successful, and so he looked for a country house, where he could store his antiquities. For this he bought the remains of Baarland Castle from Mrs. Pompoene in August 1965. Feenstra and his wife then set about to restore the castle with their own hands. Being amateurs it led to some mishaps, but in the end they were successful.

For the renovation, the whole moat was made dry. The old foundations of the wall were then made level by Mrs. Feenstra. Frames were put on top to poor concrete, but this went quite wrong at first. Later, the idea was carried out successfully. The outer facings were then covered with re-used local large brick.
