= Zandenburg =

Castle near Veere, the Netherlands

- Zandenburg
- Near Veere, Zeeland, the Netherlands
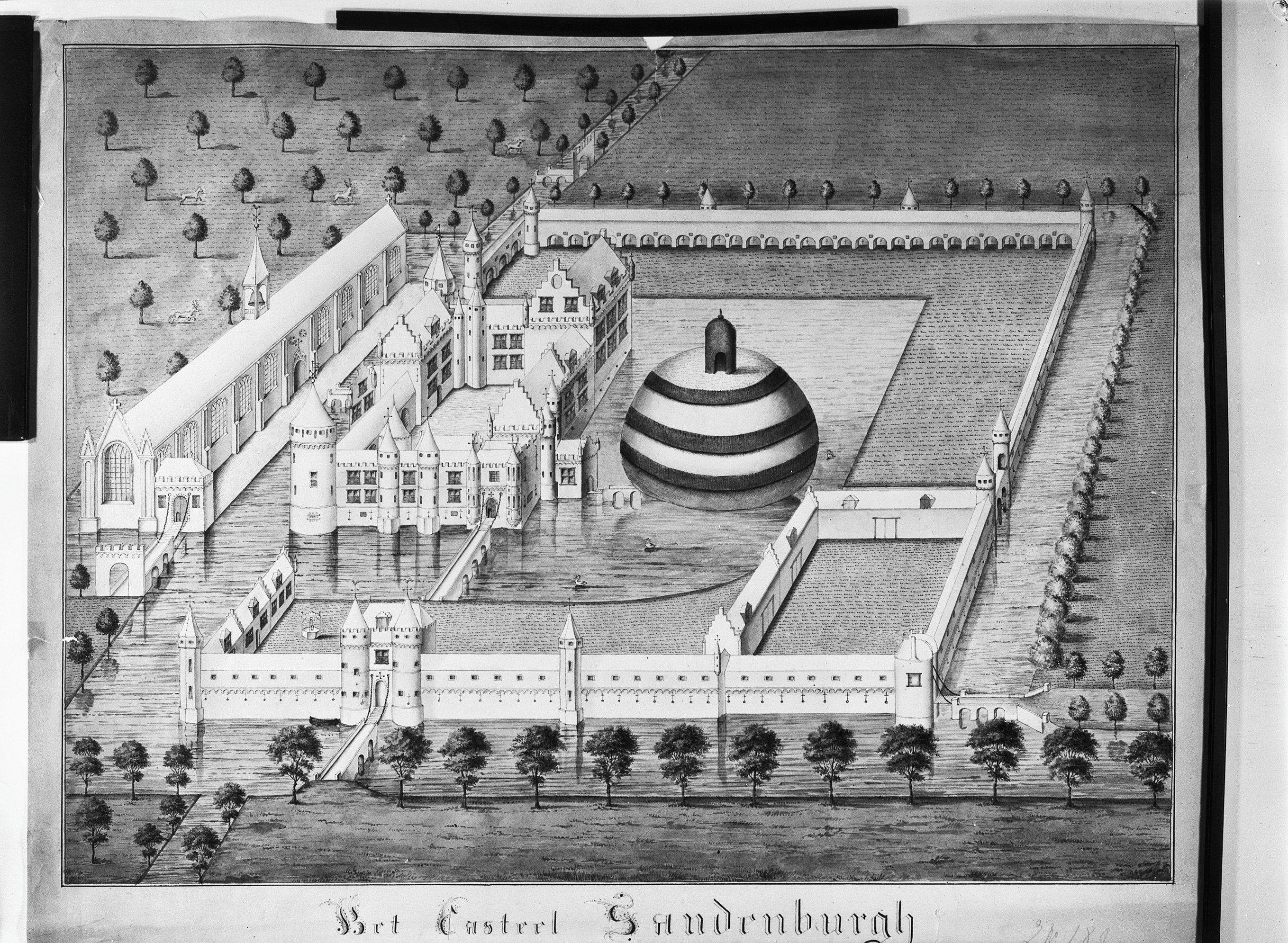
- 18th century reconstruction of Zandenburg

Site information
- Type: Castle
- Open to the public: No

Location
- The Netherlands
- Coordinates: 51.545509°N 3.656487°E

Site history
- Demolished: Main castle 1585; Some gates 1812

Zandenburg was a famous castle just south of Veere. Nothing remains of it, except some foundations below ground level.

== Location and Name ==
=== Name ===
Zandenburg was first mentioned as the house and fortress (veste) in the Lordship (ambacht) of Zanddijk. Zanddijk (Sandick) literally means dike on the sand, i.e. on an area with sandy ground. Likewise, Zandenburg is the burg (castle) near or on the sand. The second part of the name: Burg marks its origin as one of the many defendable structures built on an artificial hill.

=== Location ===
The remains of Zandenburg are located just south of the walls of Veere. In 1812 Veere's fortifications reached the castle terrains. The outer bailey of the castle reached almost up to the Veerse Watergang, which connects Veere to Middelburg. In 1944 the Inundation of Walcheren took place. After the land had been made dry much later, the outer moat on the west side of the castle terrain was found to have become part of a new waterway which ran from Zanddijk to the Veerse Watergang.

== Castle Characteristics ==
=== The sphere of Zandenburg ===
In the late seventeenth century Kornelis Klein, mayor of Veere investigated the ruins of Zandenburg. He ordered some digging for the foundations and had the mathematician Isaac Hildernisse take measurements. Like Hildernisse did at other places, he made a floor plan, but this was lost. Based on his work, several artists later made reconstructions of how they thought Zandenburg looked previously.

The most striking element of one of the eighteenth century reconstructions is an artificial hill that looks like an impossible sphere planted on the castle grounds. It is based on Hildernisse's drawing of the foundations, which shows a circular structure in the center of the terrain. A very solid explanation of the impossible sphere was given by Verwey. He noted that the path around the hill, and the cupola on top resembled a very close by castle motte which had such a path and cupola only decades before, and might have inspired the drawers.

=== Early Zandenburg ===
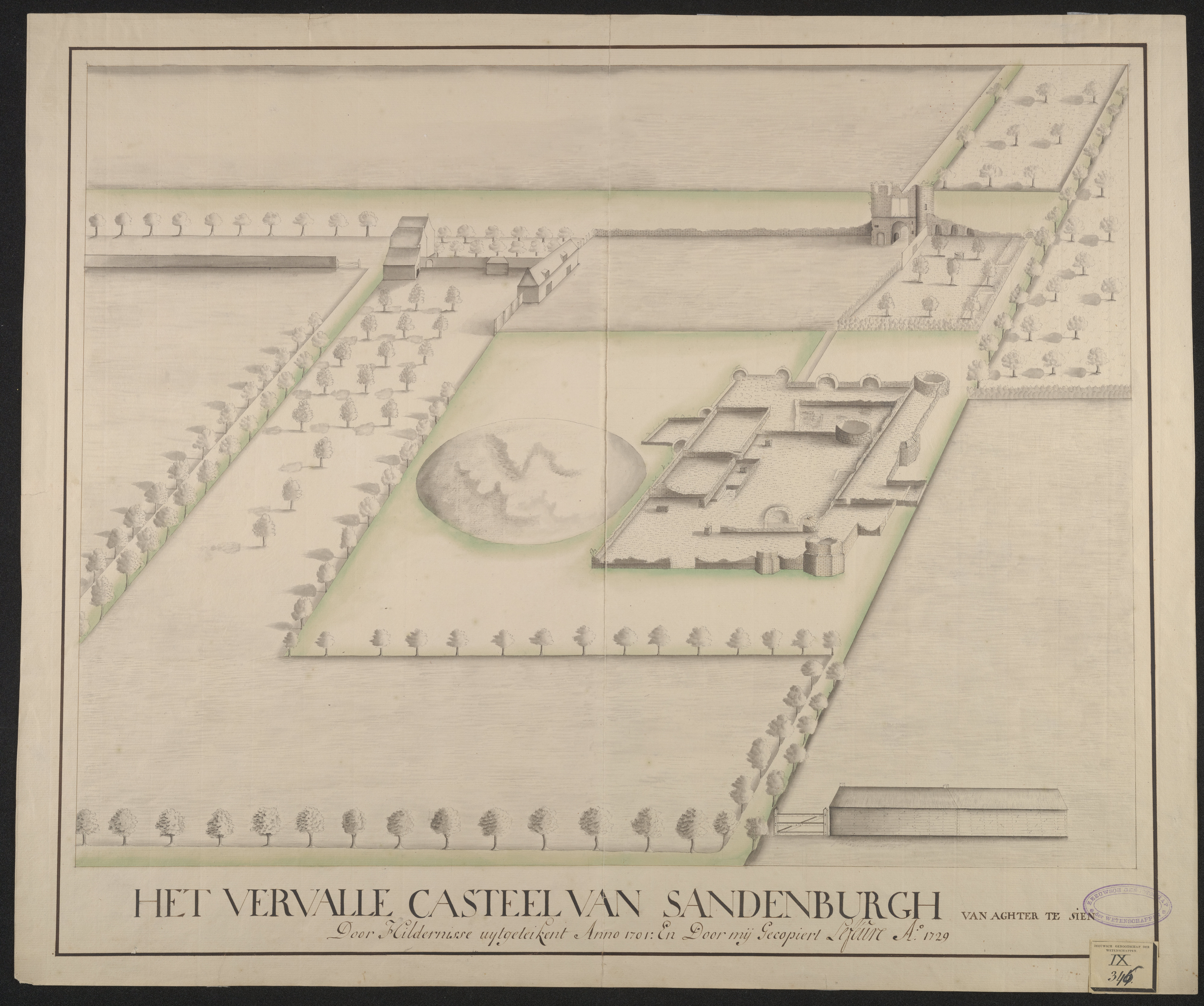
The 1729 copy / drawing of Hildernisse's Zandenburg

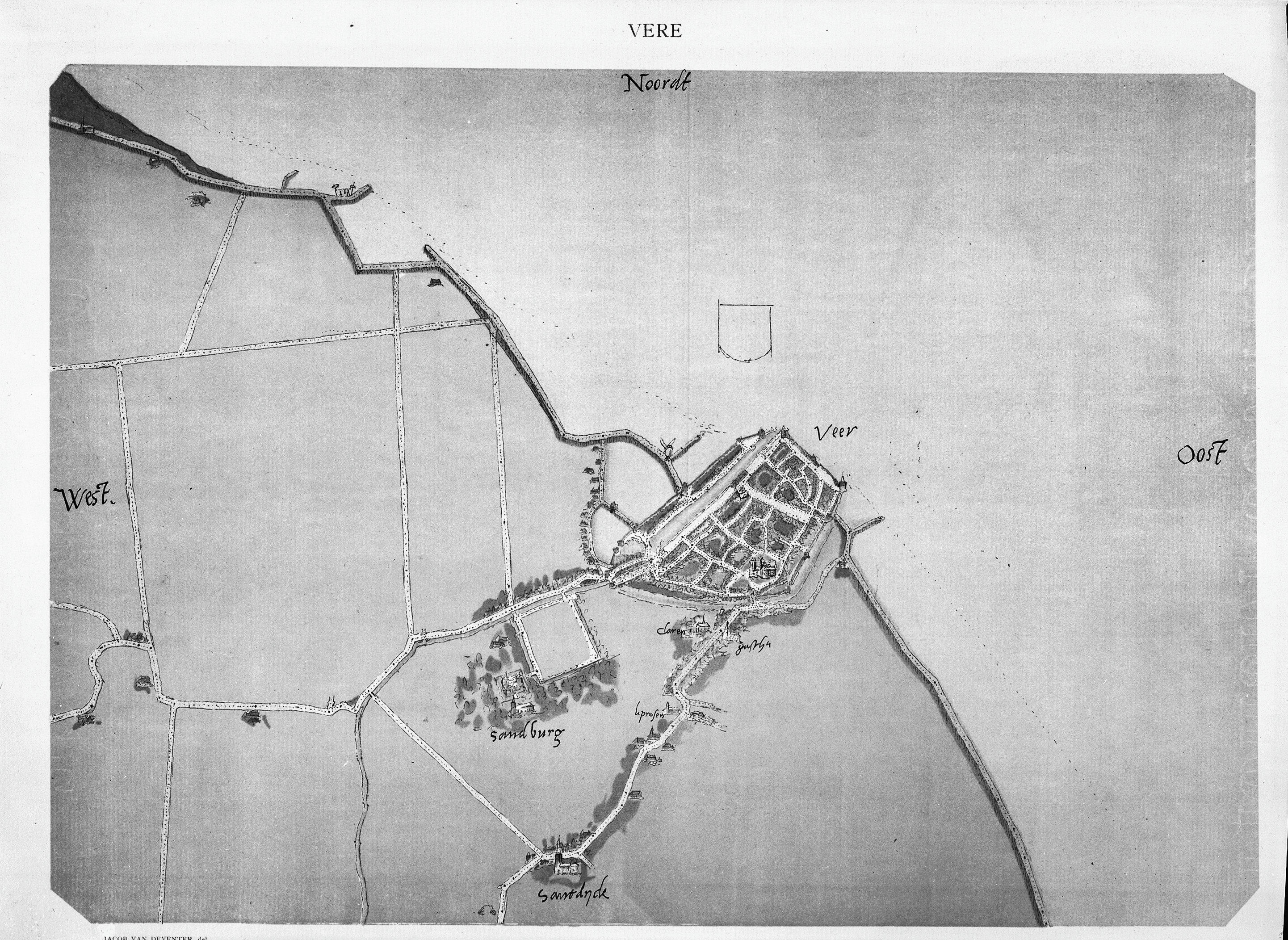
Veere map by Van Deventer, Eekhoff version

There can be little doubt that there was a circular, and therefore artificial structure at Zandenburg. It dated from the thirteenth century or earlier and according to later drawings, it had a diameter of about 35 m. It could have been one of the c. 150 artificial hills in Zeeland. In such case, it is probable that Zandenburg was a motte-and-bailey castle. Jaap Renaud thought a round water castle much more likely than a small hill. Not in the least because he did not see any document that referred to an elevated terrain.

In 1955 a single trench was dug through the area where the hill was supposed to be. The ground was sterile and did not show any evidence typical for artificial hills. Nothing was found; no brick, no pottery shreds, no animal bones. On the other hand, it also did not show evidence of a water castle.

While the original drawings by Hildernisse were lost, a 1729 copy shows a motte (see picture). This copy also has the outer bailey walls correct, and is therefore rather credible. Furthermore, the relatively small known remains of the 13th century castle border this motte. Renaud noted that if there was ever a place for further archaeological investigations, it would be the 'motte' of Zandenburg.

In 1983 Verwey published extensive research on the location and depictions of Zandenburg. He said that the two known contemporary depictions of Zandenburg do not depict a hill. The Panorma of Walcheren, attributed to Anton van den Wyngaerde rather accurately depicts the castle, but no hill on the north side of the castle. The other depiction of the castle is on the Veere maps by Van Deventer. The Madrid version of the Veere map clearly shows a rectangular castle and no hill. On the contrary, the Eekhoff version is less clear and might show a round structure resembling a round water castle. Verwey also noted that in 1551, when the castle was still intact, the historian Reygersberg, who lived in Veere wrote: en neffens der oud sale van Zandenburch ziet men noch hedentendage eenen hoghen Zandbergh liggende. (and next to the old hall of Zandenburg one can today still see a high sand hill). Renaud probably missed the observation by Reygersberg. However, he noted that out of fear for the Spanish the inhabitants of Veere demolished a lot at Zandenburg, and that they would certainly have levelled a high hill close to the city walls.

Apart from the hill, the only other known remains of the early castle consisted of a few stretches of wall excavated in 1955. These dated from the 13th century, and were made from red bricks measuring 30 * 15 * 8 cm. These small remains are in line with the accepted theory that the first Zandenburg was built by Wolfert van Borselen in about 1280.

=== The square castle ===
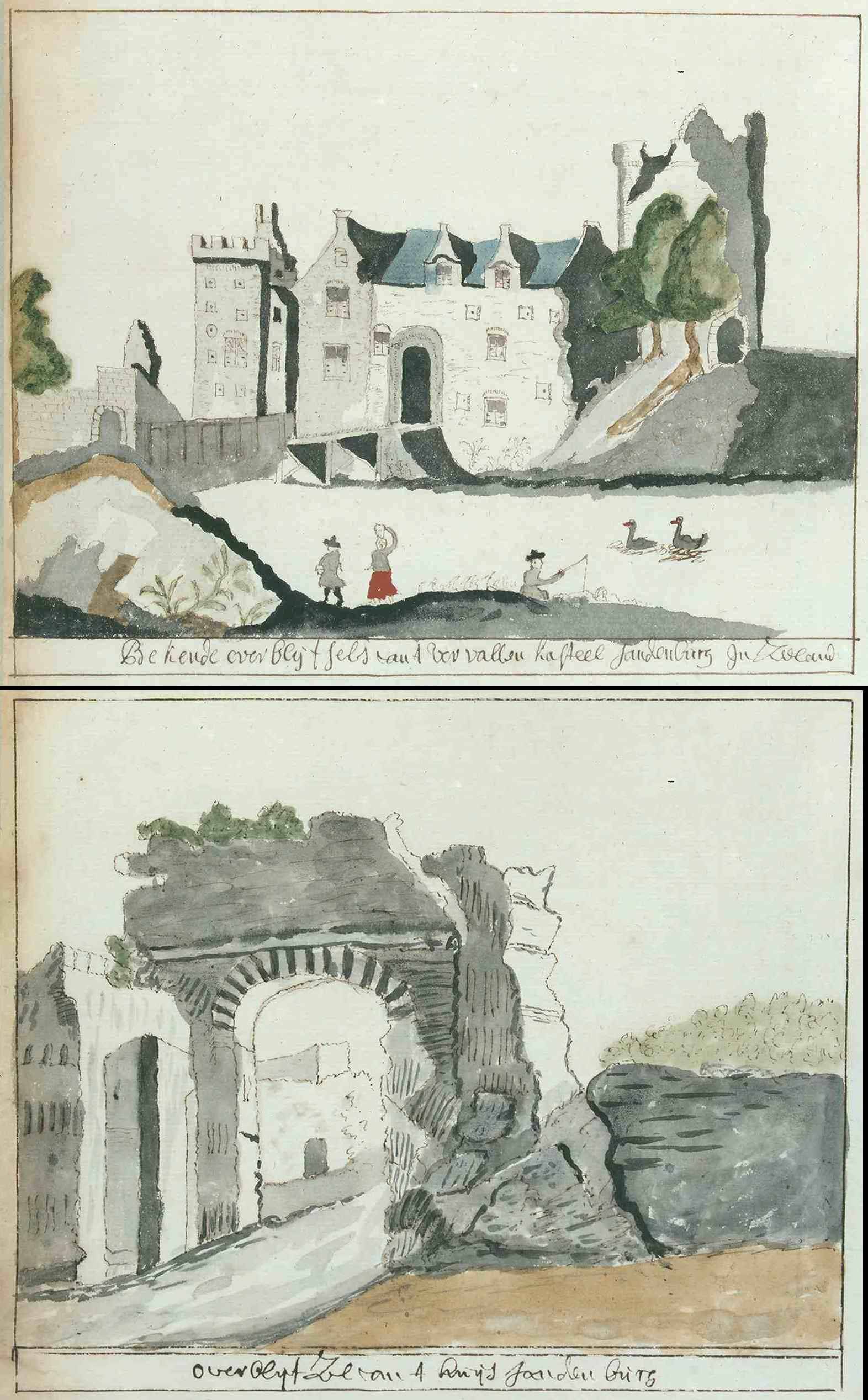
Zandenburg

The big square castle and its huge outer bailey date from the second half of the 15th century. This is the castle depicted on the (reconstruction) drawings and the floor plan of the excavations. These look glorious, and are mostly in line with archaeological evidence. Two aspects are relevant for history: How rich was Zandenburg, and what was the military value of the castle? The archaeological evidence sheds some light on this.

In 1955 almost the whole eastern half of the main castle was excavated. The excavations showed a large square castle. Unlike the 18th century pictures, the walls of the castle did not meet at 90 degree angles. The walls near the eastern corner tower had parallel inside walls at about 2 m distance. These probably had to do with the defensive functions of the castle.

On the northern corner of the main castle was a tower house with walls of about 2 meter thick at the base. The report of the excavations did not date the tower house differently from the rest of the main castle.

On the courtyard, or rather below it, was a dome for harvesting rainwater. It was made of small 19 cm long brick, and therefore a later addition to the castle. It had two thin circular walls with a layer of loam in between. The bottom and the inside were plastered. The dome was about 2–3 m high.

The huge outer bailey was 150 m long. The limited excavations did not show the gate buildings on the outer bailey. However, these are known from 18th and 19th century pictures, and are known to have been demolished in 1812. A heavy fragment on the east side was probably the only remnant of the eastern gatehouse.

On the southwest corner of the outer bailey, the foundations of a significant building were found. These were made of re-used 13th century brick, mixed with smaller bricks. Accounts indicate the presence of a wall with arcs and a chemin de ronde on the outer bailey. It's not known how much of the outer bailey was protected by such walls.

About 250 m south of the castle, the half-circle choir of the castle chapel was found. Hildernisse probably missed this structure, because later reconstructions showed a large square church building, which had nothing to do with what the archaeologists found.

The outside of the main castle foundations was covered with light-gray stone. This is a sign of wealth, and so is the size of the main castle and of the outer bailey, and the presence of a separate chapel. The above shows that the square castle was not only the seat of a wealthy lord, but was also very defendable.

== History ==
=== The Lords of Zanddijk ===
The first lords of Zandenburg were known by the name of their lordship, i.e. as 'van Zandijk'. When Simon van Zandijk died without legal male successors in 1247, he was succeeded by Hendrik Wisse van Borsele.

=== The Van Borselen family ===
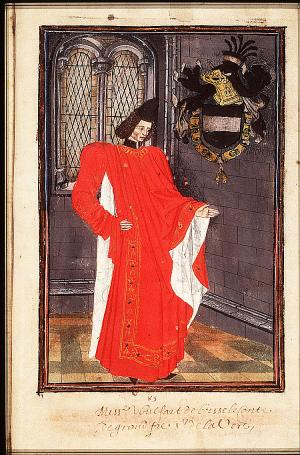
Wolfert VI van Borselen

Hendrik I van Borselen is supposed to have been present at a tournament in Haarlem in 1235 as Heer van (lord of) Veere. Hendrik belonged to a younger branch of the Van Borselen family, named for the village Borsele on Zuid-Beveland. Until 1390 the branch of the Lords of Veere had a coat of arms which included three stars, to distinguish them from the main branch, headed by Hendrik's brother Frank.

Hendrik I is supposed to have founded early Zandenburg, of which so little is known with certainty. He remarried Maria van Egmont, and had Wolfert I, Raas, Jan and Hadewich.

In 1282 Wolfert I van Borselen and his wife Sibilie paid homage to Countess Beatrice of Holland for their lands near Zandijk. Wolfert received them back in fief in from her, and after her from the counts of Holland, through her marriage to Floris V, Count of Holland. While other fiefs in Zeeland were only inheritable by sons, this was granted as inheritable by any descendant of Wolfert. Floris V also joined and sealed the contract.

Wolfert I would play a significant role in history of Holland and Zeeland. He became a kind of regent for John I, Count of Holland. During his tenure John was very often in Veere, probably at Magdalon Castle, also known as Latedale. Wolfert I amassed much wealth, but was lynched in Delft in 1299. Most of the fiefs he had acquired in Holland were then seized by the count of Holland.

Wolfert II van Borselen would succeed his father Wolfert I. In 1300 the Van Borselen's killed some of their enemies in Veere. In 1303 Wolfert II sided with the Count of Flanders, and the inhabitants of Veere killed their Holland governor. In 1309 these violent events were reconciled. Wolfert II died in 1317.

Wolfert III van Borselen became the next lord of Veere. Wolfert II was styled as Lord of Veere in 1341. He was probably responsible for the first city walls of Veere. In 1350 Count William granted or confirmed Wolfert III in the possession of Veere and other goods, including Zandenburg. During the Hook and Cod wars Wolfert III first sided with Margaret, but then revolted against her. He lost the Battle of Veere, and died soon after.

Next came Wolfert IV. He would be succeeded by his younger brother Hendrik II. Hendrik II got Hendrik III, who was succeeded by his younger brother Wolfert IV (?-1411). During Wolfert IV's rule Veere became steadily more suitable as a sea harbor.

Hendrik IV (?-1474) was still young when his father died. Hendrik IV was very successful in commerce and in naval warfare. He even became a member of the Order of the Golden Fleece in 1445. Wolfert VI of Borselen (c. 1433–1487) married Mary Stewart, Countess of Buchan at Zandenburg in 1444. Mary died without surviving offspring in 1465. In 1467 Wolfert VI became stadholder of Holland and Zeeland. He was also Admiral of the Burgundian Netherlands. Wolfert VI was on the losing side in the Flemish revolts against Maximilian of Austria and died in exile.

=== Burgundy-Beveren ===
Anna van Borselen was probably born from Wolfert VI's second wife in 1471 or later. She was married to Philip of Burgundy-Beveren (1450-1498) in the early 1480s. Philip belonged to a bastard branch of the dukes of Burgundy, and was Admiral of the Netherlands from 1491. Anna would later remarry with Louis of Montfoort. He was acknowledged as Lord of Veere in 1503, but died soon after, in 1505. In 1505 a disastrous fire ruined most of the outer bailey of Zandenburg. However, Anna's rule from 1498 till the ascent of her son was glorious, with Veere expanding, and many princes visiting Zandenburg.

Adolf of Burgundy (1489–1540) son of Anna and Philip became Lord of Veere on 22 August 1504. However, his mother lived till 1518, and documents indicate that for a time she continued to be involved on a daily basis. Adolf quickly got the esteem of the lords of the Netherlands. He also became Admiral of the Netherlands.

Maximilian of Burgundy (1514-1558) succeeded in 1540. He became Stadholder of Holland, Zeeland and Utrecht in 1547. Maximilian also became Admiral, and became Marquis of Veere and Vlissingen in 1555. His archives allowed a reconstruction of his court at Zandenburg. It consisted of four departments. At the top were the office (bureau) and the gentlemen. The chambre cared for the personal needs of the lord and lady. The écuyerie and fourrerie were concerned with horses and weapons, and did maintenance and external distribution. The kitchen and boutellerie were concerned with processing food and drink. This was a general model of organization, but for Maximilian's court, details of the number of staff and their names are known.

Maximilien de Hénin, 3rd Count of Bossu (1542-1578) inherited Veere and Zandenburg from Maximilian, but the estate was so debt-ridden that his father decided to refuse the inheritance. In 1567 Philip II of Spain then bought the scaled down Marquisate of Veere.

=== Demolished at the start of the Eighty Years' War ===
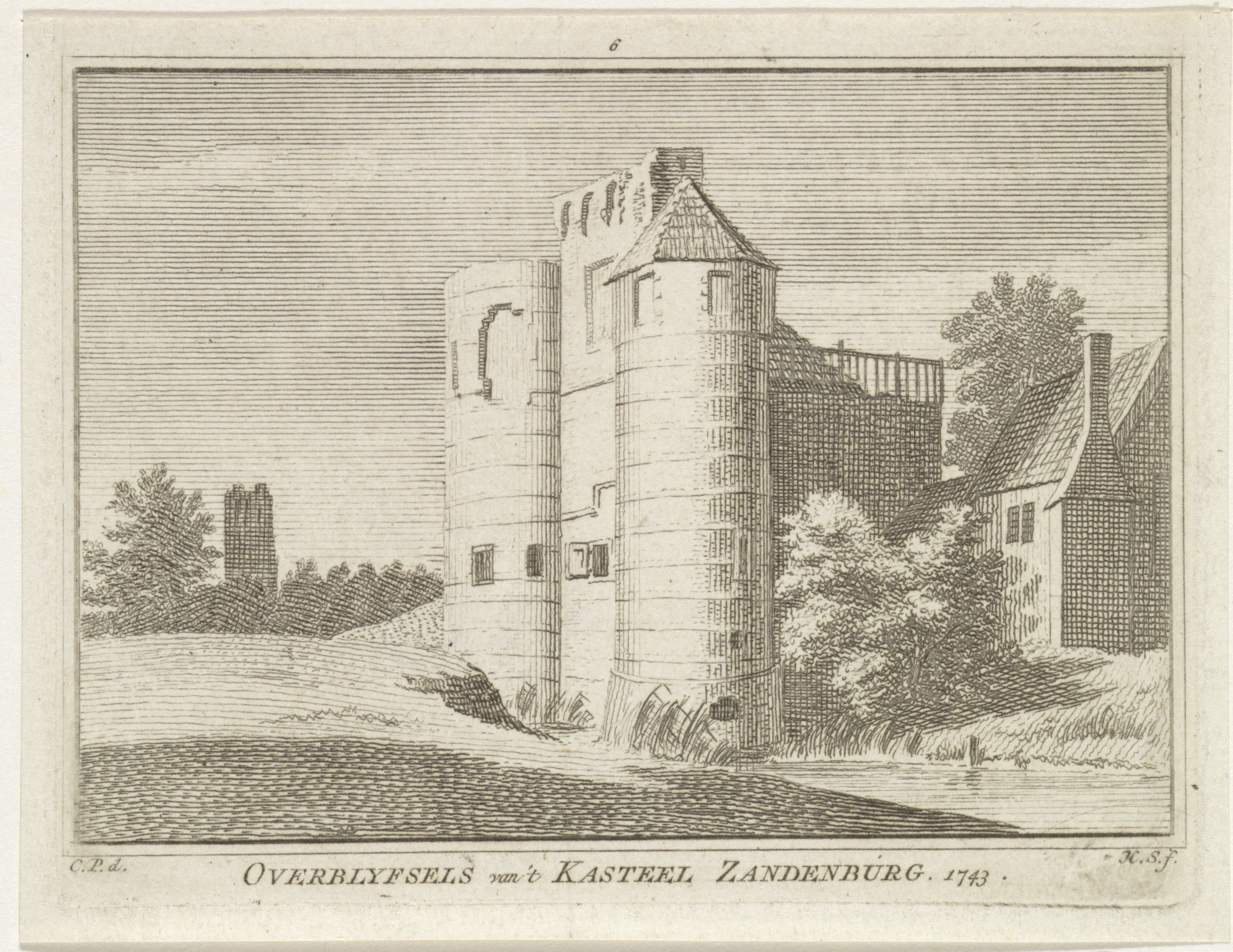
Zandenburg, remains of an outer bailey gate in 1754.

Almost from the start of the Eighty Years' War Veere sided with the rebels. From 3 May 1572 it successfully kept the Spanish troops at bay. Zandenburg fell into disrepair and ruin. In 1585 almost everything that was left of the castle was demolished and used to build Bastion Oranje in Veere. In 1582 William the Silent had bought the marquisate, but he was only interested in the power that this gave him in the States of Zeeland.

=== The ruins of Zandenburg (1585-2021) ===
After most of Zandenburg was demolished, there were a few remains. The artificial hill described above, had disappeared by 1700. The gate called voorpoort had been converted into a house, and would stand till 1812. There was also a big barn and there were two towers near the Veerse Watergang. These remains of the outer bailey were demolished in 1812, when the French extended the fortifications of Veere.

By 1944 nothing remained of Zandenburg, excepts the remnants of some moats, and even these were largely destroyed that year. In 1948 some foundations became visible on a new water leading from Zanddijk to Veere. In 1955 a Land consolidation project started in the area. It led to a hasty archaeological excavation of part of the terrain by Jaap Renaud, because any foundations that were found would be removed.

In 2005 the site of Zandenburg was protected as an archaeological monument. In 2018 the Walcherse Archeologische Dienst started to investigate the terrain with the use of Ground-penetrating radar
