= Anna van Borselen =

Netherlandish noble (c.1472–1518)

- Lady of Veere and Zandenburg
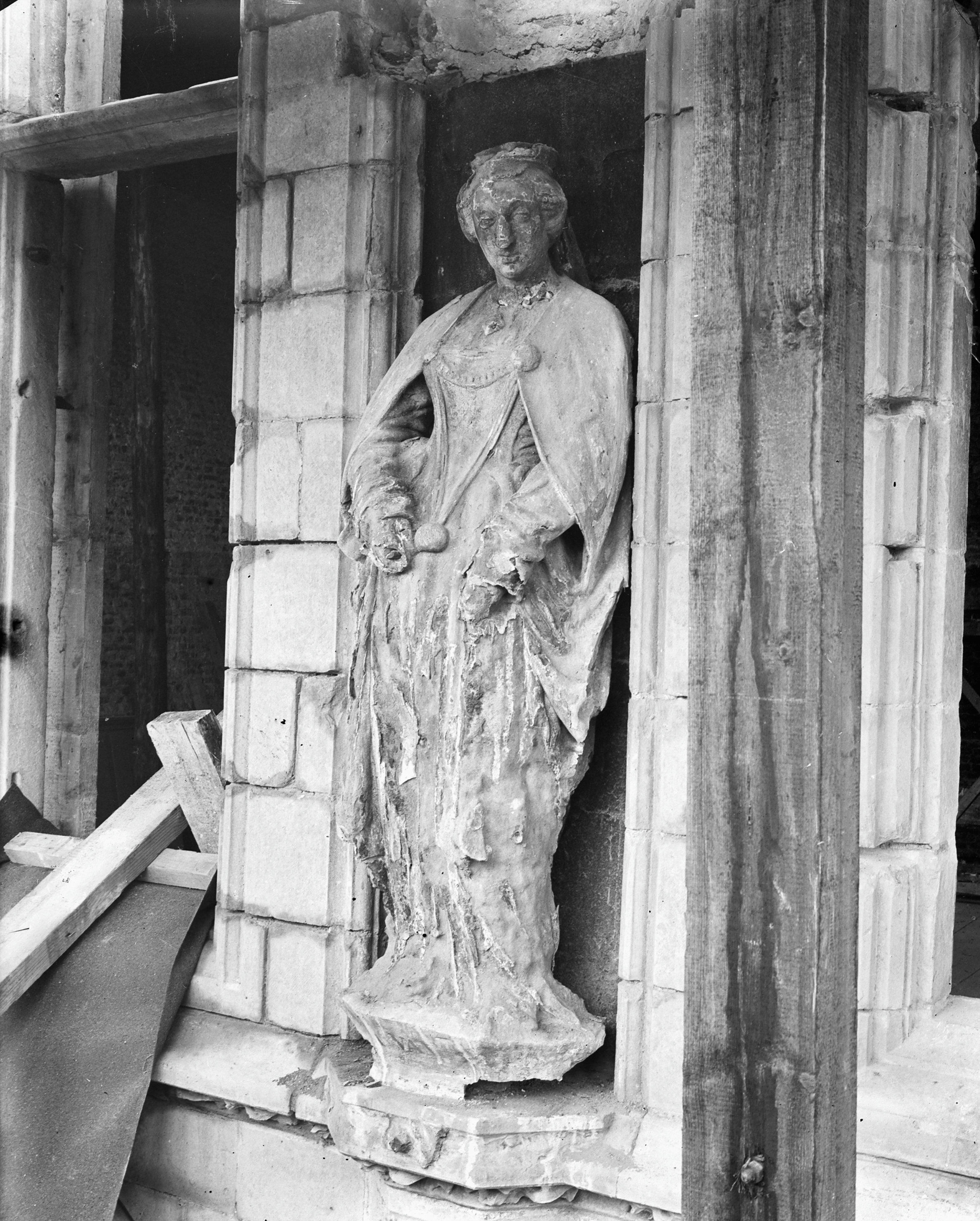
- Status of Anna van Borselen in 1934
- Predecessor: Wolfert VI of Borselen
- Successor: Adolf of Burgundy
- Born: c. 1472
- Died: 8 December 1518
- Spouse: Philip of Burgundy-Beveren
- Issue Detail: Adolf of Burgundy
- Father: Wolfert VI of Borselen
- Mother: Charlotte de Bourbon-Montpensier

Anna van Borselen (c. 1472–1518) was a noble in what is now the Netherlands, and was Lady of Veere, Countess of Grandpré, Lady of Vlissingen, Westkapelle, Zandenburg, etc.

== Early life ==
=== Family ===
Anna's father Wolfert VI of Borselen (d. 1487) first married Mary Stewart, Countess of Buchan (d. 1465) in 1444. On 17 June 1468 Wolfert remarried to Charlotte of Bourbon-Montpensier (1449–1478), daughter of Louis I, Count of Montpensier.

From Anna's father's first marriage were born Charles, who died at age 13, and Jean, who also died while still young. From the second marriage were born: Louis, who died in childhood; Anna; Margaret of Ridderkerk and Cloetinge, married to Walraven van Brederode; Maria of Baarland married to Martin II von Polheim; Joan married to Wolfgang von Polheim.

=== Estate ===
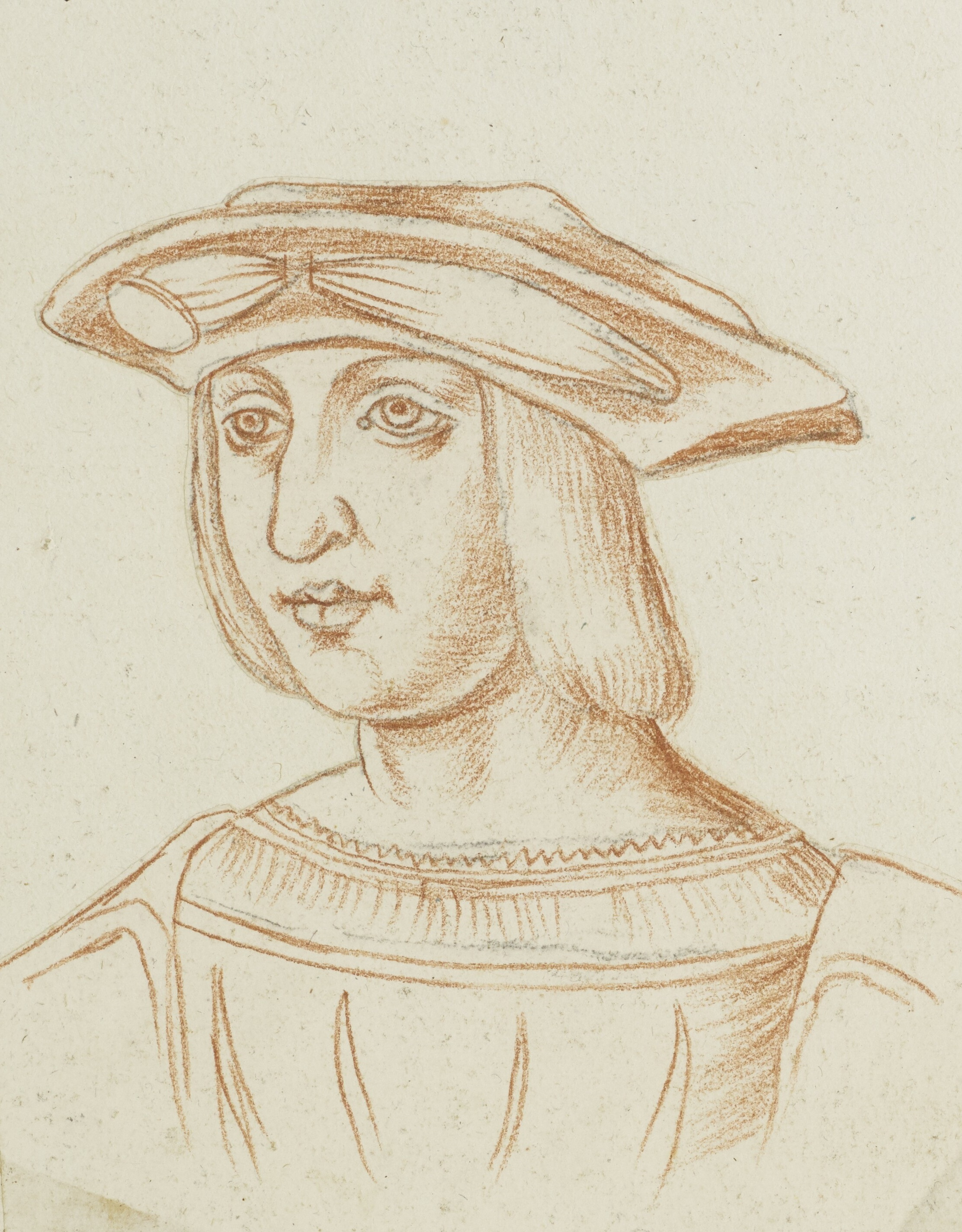
Philip of Burgundy-Beveren

The branch of the Van Borselen family that Anna belonged to was known as that of the Lords of Veere. This branch first centered on Zanddijk and the close by Zandenburg. Near the ferry to Noord-Beveland a fishing village grew known as Veere. The unpredictable course of nature then made the Veerse Gat steadily deeper, creating a superior roadstead before Veere while competing harbors were lost. Veere developed into a small city, but the famous trade with Scotland would blossom after Anna's reign. Apart from Veere, the family was also lord of Vlissingen, Westkapelle, Domburg, Brouwershaven. Indeed, they were lords of Walcheren except for the triangle between Middelburg, Arnemuiden and Fort Rammekens.

=== Marriage ===
The family relations meant that Anna became heiress of Veere and Zandenburg. She was therefore a very desirable marriage partner. On 4 July 1485 the marriage contract between Anna and Philip of Burgundy-Beveren (c. 1450 – 1498) was signed. The marriage was consummated somewhere in the period 1487–1489. On 19 May 1486 Philip and Anna were confirmed as lord and lady of Veere. Philip was a son of Anthony, bastard of Burgundy, who in turn was a natural son of Philip the Good.

Philip of Burgundy-Beveren was more than 20 years older than Anna. He had distinguished himself in the 1477 defense of Saint-Omer. He had become a knight of the Golden Fleece in 1478. On the death of Mary of Burgundy in 1482, Philip had become a member of a four men tutelage council that Flanders imposed on Maximilian of Austria.

== Life ==
=== As wife of Philip of Burgundy-Beveren (1485-1498) ===
After her marriage to such a powerful man as Philip of Burgundy-Beveren was, Anna was the "wife of". The first years of Anna's marriage were difficult. In 1488 her husband and Maximilian of Austria were even imprisoned by the people of Bruges. Philip was chamberlain of Maximilian. He died in Bruges on 4 August 1498.

In 1488 a daughter was born to Anna. In 1489 she gave birth to her successor Adolf of Burgundy.

=== As a widow (1498-1502) ===
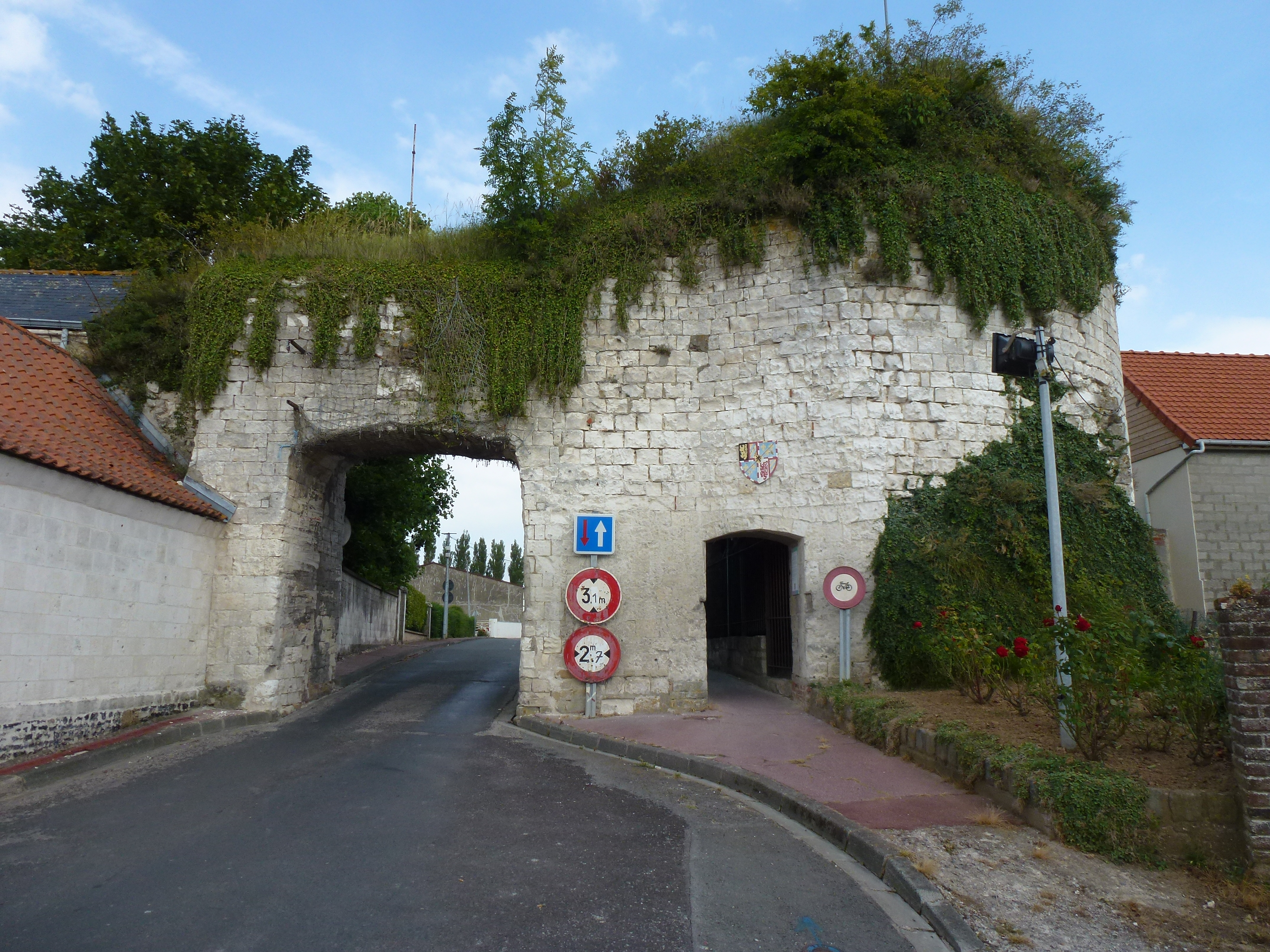
Tournehem Castle ruins

The famous scholar Erasmus (1466-1536) was very good in Latin at a young age. He therefore became secretary to bishop David of Burgundy. In Bergen op Zoom he came to know Jacob Battus (c. 1465–1502) secretary of that town. Jacob enabled him to study in Paris. In 1499 and 1501 Erasmus visited Tournehem Castle, owned by Anna's father in law Anthony, bastard of Burgundy who lived till 1504. At the castle Jacob Battus had become governor of Anna's children. In January 1500 Erasmus wrote an overly flattering letter to Anna van Borselen, hoping for financial support. He needed to become a doctor, and at the time he was not a well known writer. Anna gave some support, but not much. In 1501 Erasmus would accidentally meet Anna on the streets of Veere, but apart from acknowledging each other, they did not talk then.

Anna's problem was that her father had acquired a lot of possessions, but had also accumulated a substantial debt. Battus informed Erasmus about her bad financial situation. In general, the income of high offices could offset high debts, but this income had ended with the death of her husband in 1498.

=== Married to Louis of Montfoort (1502-1505) ===
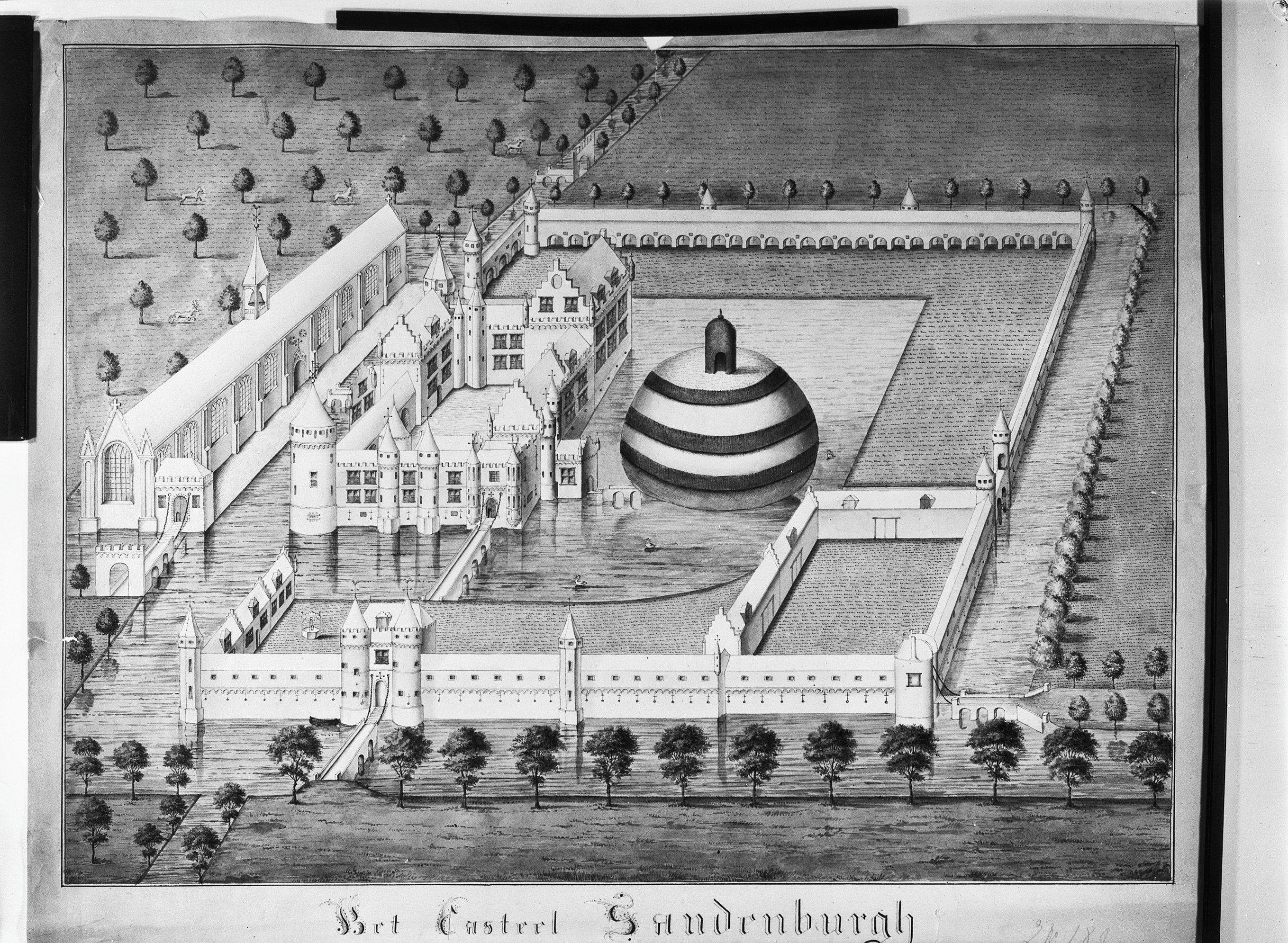
The Zandenburg

Anna would remarry to Louis of Montfoort, a younger brother of Jan III van Montfoort (1448-1522). In January 1501 Anna's son Adolf got ownership of Veere, and in June 1502 Louis was confirmed as Lord of Veere. It meant that whatever happened, after Anna, Adolph would get Veere. Louis would only rule during Adolf's minority. He died on 10 November 1505. That same year a fire caused a lot destruction on the Zandenburg.

=== Mother of Adolf (1505-1518) ===
On 22 August 1504 Adolf came of age, and was confirmed as Lord of Veere. Adolf would quickly gain the respect and esteem of the sovereigns of the Burgundian Netherlands, gradually diminishing Anna's role. However, Anna's interests in commerce and fishery meant that she continued to be involved. In 1505 a delegation from Veere visited James IV of Scotland in Adolf's name, but no decisive results were obtained. In 1515 Adolf became a knight of the Golden Fleece.

Adolf's son Maximilian of Burgundy (1514–1558), was the Lord of Veere who had Cornelis Battus (son of Jacob) as teacher for some time. This was also the time that Erasmus was a regular visitor at Zandenburg.

In September 1518 the Plague entered Zeeland. Anna fled to Domburg, but when she came back to Zandenburg she contracted the disease, and died on 8 December 1518.

=== Statue ===
Anna's statue on the façade of the town hall of Veere dates from about 1517.

== Offspring ==
With Philip of Burgundy-Beveren Anna had:

- Adolf of Burgundy born 18 June 1489, married to Anna van Bergen
- Anna, betrothed to Jan van Bergen, brother of Anna van Bergen, he died before the marriage
- Charlotte, married to Joos van Kruiningen
- Anthony
