= Pierre Coustain =

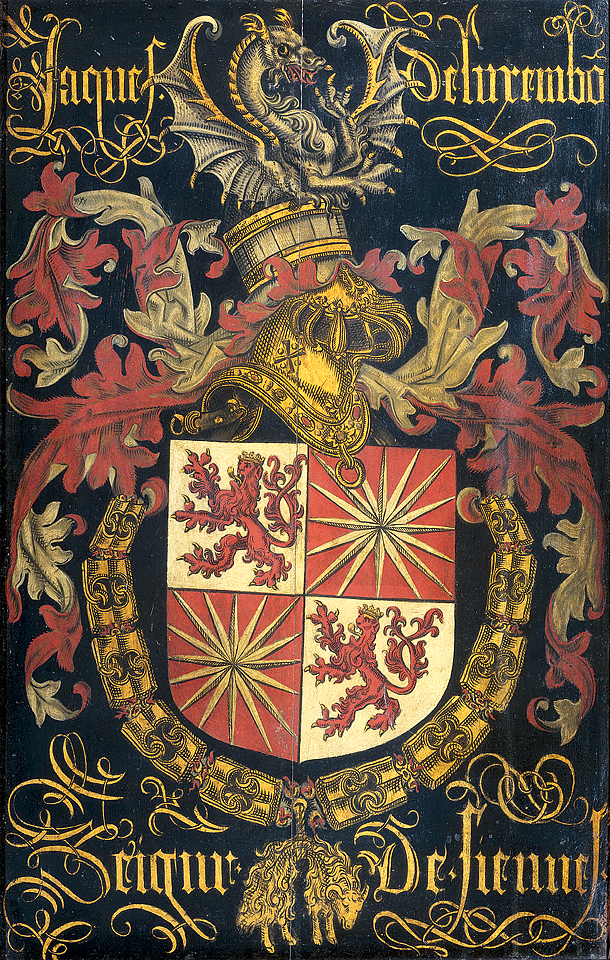
Shield of Jacob of Luxemburg as knight of the Order of the Golden Fleece. Ca. 1481, now at the Rijksmuseum Amsterdam.

Pierre Coustain was a painter and sculptor at the Court of Philip the Good. His name occurs in the records of the brotherhood of St. Luke at Bruges in the year 1450 as Painter Royal.

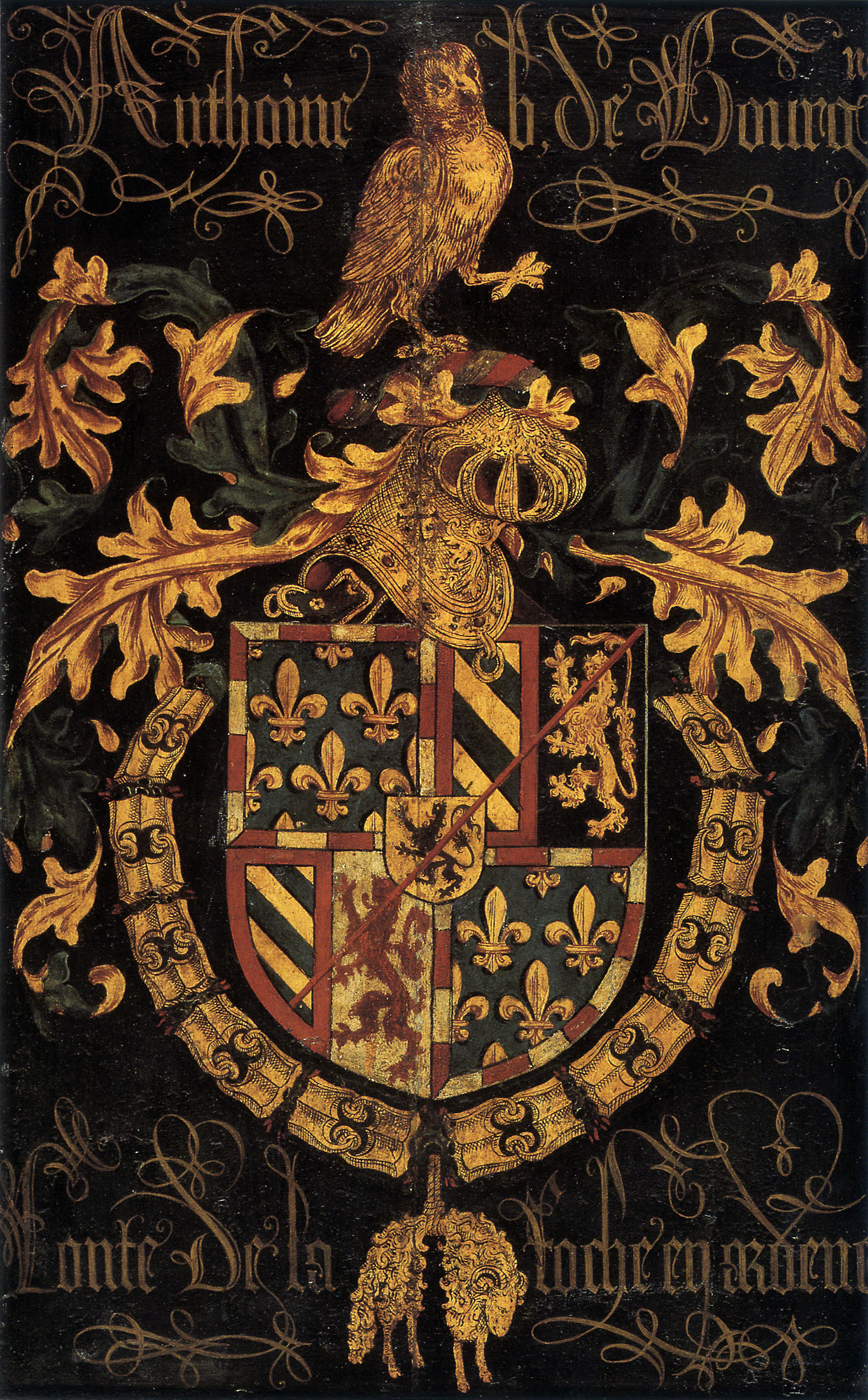
Shield of Antoine of Burgundy as knight of the Order of the Golden Fleece
