= Maximilian of Burgundy =

Dutch stadtholder (1514–1558)

- Marquis of Veere; Lord of Beveren; Stadtholder of Holland, Zeeland and Utrecht
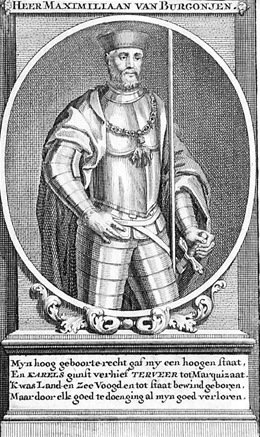

- Coat of arms
- Native name: Maximiliaan II van Bourgondië (Dutch)
- Born: 28 July 1514; Bergen op Zoom, Habsburg Netherlands
- Died: 4 June 1558 (aged 43); Zandenburg, Habsburg Netherlands
- Spouse: Louise (Louiza) of Croÿ
- Father: Adolf of Burgundy
- Mother: Anna of Bergen

Maximilian of Burgundy (1514–1558), Marquis of Veere and Lord of Beveren, was a noble from the Low Countries in the service of the Habsburgs.

== Family ==
Maximilian was the son of Adolf of Burgundy and Anna of Bergen. He was a descendant of Antoine, bastard of Burgundy, illegitimate son of Philip the Good. The marquis of Veere resided at Zandenburg.

== Life ==
Desiderius Erasmus was a regular visitor at Maximilian's father's house and Erasmus wrote the young Maximilian letters to encourage him to study science. In 1540 Maximilian succeeded his father as admiral of the Netherlands. In 1542 he became admiral of Flanders and in 1546 Knight in the Order of the Golden Fleece.

In 1547 he became Stadtholder of Holland, Zeeland and Utrecht and Admiral-general of Zeeland. In 1555, Emperor Charles V promoted his Lordship of Veere to a Marquisate, as reward for Maximilian's 25-year-long loyal service.

Maximilian married in 1542 with Louise of Croÿ, daughter of Philippe II de Croÿ. The marriage remained childless. After his death, all his possessions went to his nephew Maximilien de Hénin-Liétard, son of his sister Anna. However, the Marquisate of Veere had to be sold for debt.

As Stadtholder of Holland, Zeeland and Utrecht, he was succeeded by William the Silent, at that time still loyal to the King of Spain.

== Gallery ==
Arms of Maximilian and his father Adolf.

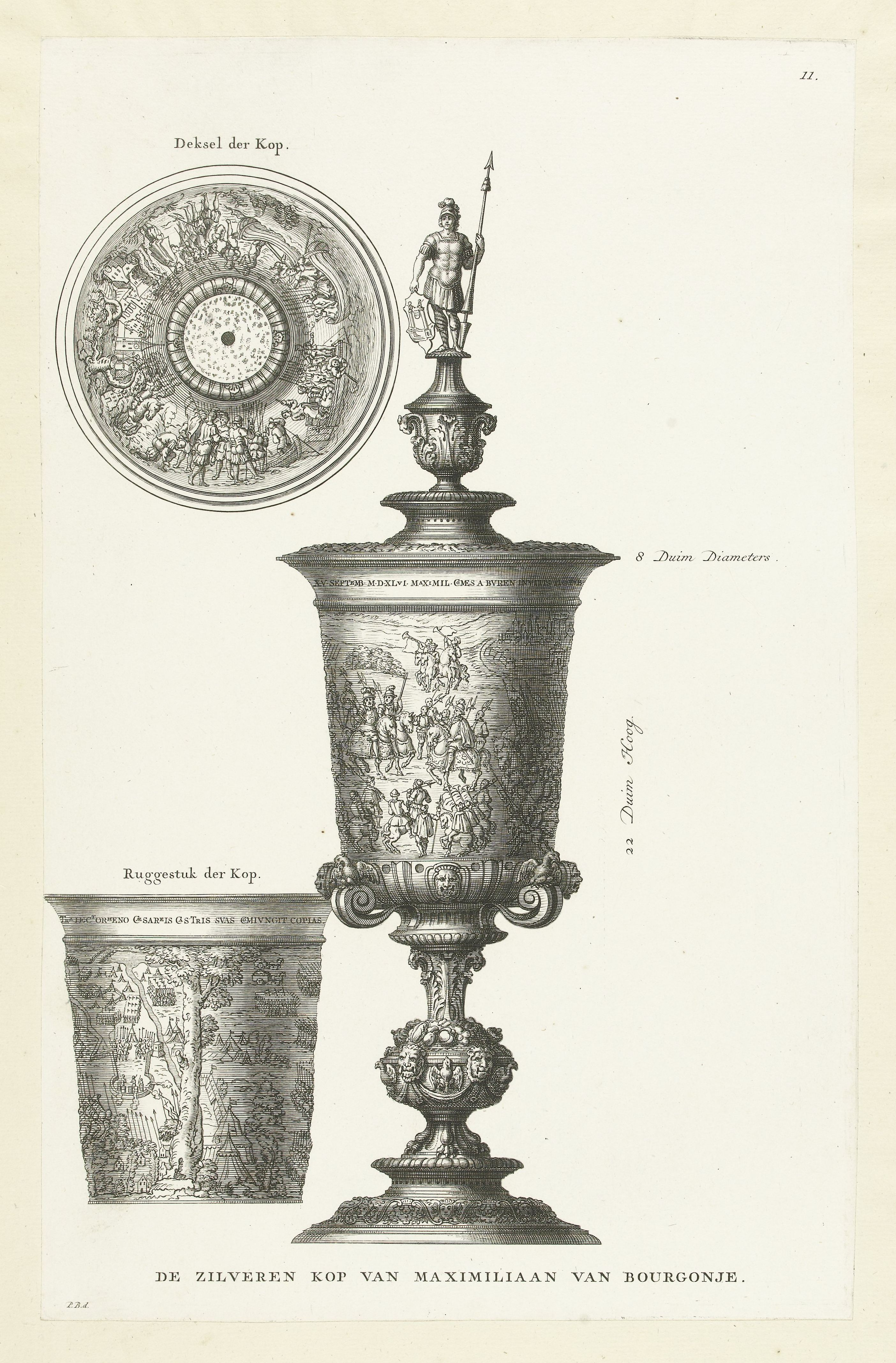
Illustration of a silver cup, gifted to the city of Veeren in 1551 by Maximilian.

Preceded by Louis of Praet	Stadtholder of Holland, Zeeland and Utrecht; 1546–1558	Succeeded by William the Silent
