= Baron of Wissekerke =

Title of nobility in Spain

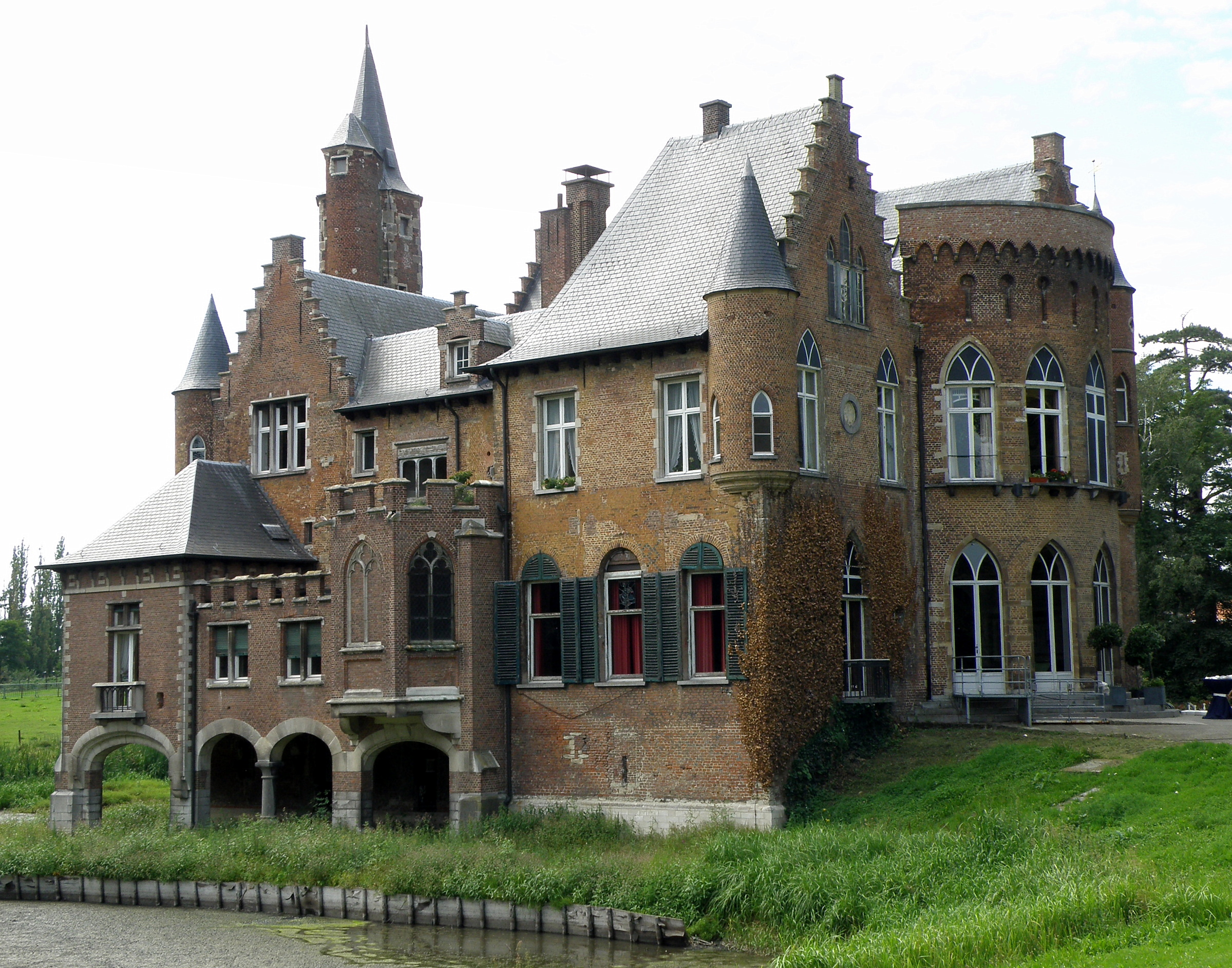
Wissekerke Castle, the seat of the barony.

Baron of Wissekerke (or Wissenkercke) was a title created on 31 July 1630 by the Spanish king Philip IV for Philip of Récourt. Philip had acquired the Lordship of Wissekerke by his marriage to Margareth of Steelant, Lady of Wissekerke. The title remained in use until the death of Ivo of Récourt, the 5th Baron, in 1745.

== Barons of Wissekerke (1630-1745) ==
Philip of Récourt (1561–1635) dit of Licques, Knight, Baron of Wissekerke, Lord of Audenthun and La Verre

- Servatius of Récourt dit of Licques (1604–1639), Baron of Wissekerke, Lord of Audenthun and Beaufort
  - Philip of Récourt dit of Licques (b. 1635), Baron of Wissekerke, Lord of Rupelmonde
    - Philip of Récourt dit of Licques (d. 1682), Count of Rupelmonde, Baron of Wissekerke, Lord of Beerlandt and Diericxlandt
      - Maximilian Philip Joseph Eugene of Récourt-Lens-Boulogne-Licques (d. 1710), Count of Rupelmonde, Baron of Wissekerke, Lord of Beerlandt and Diericxlandt
        - Ivo Mary Joseph of Récourt-Lens-Boulogne-Licques (d. 1745), Count of Rupelmonde, Baron of Wissekerke
  - Eugene of Récourt, dit of Licques
  - Aurelia of Récourt, dit of Licques
  - Two more daughters, both nuns in the Hocht Abbey (Lanaken)
- Philip of Récourt, dit of Licques, Lord of La Verre
- Nicholas of Récourt, dit of Licques, Lord of La Verre (after his brother's death)
  - Mary-Philippote of Licques
  - Clare-Theresa of Licques
- Margaret of Récourt, dit of Licques, nun in the Priory of Saint Margaret (Ghent)
- Isabella of Récourt, dit of Licques, nun in the Priory of Saint Margaret (Ghent)
