= Marquis of Veere and Flushing =

One of the titles of the Dutch monarch

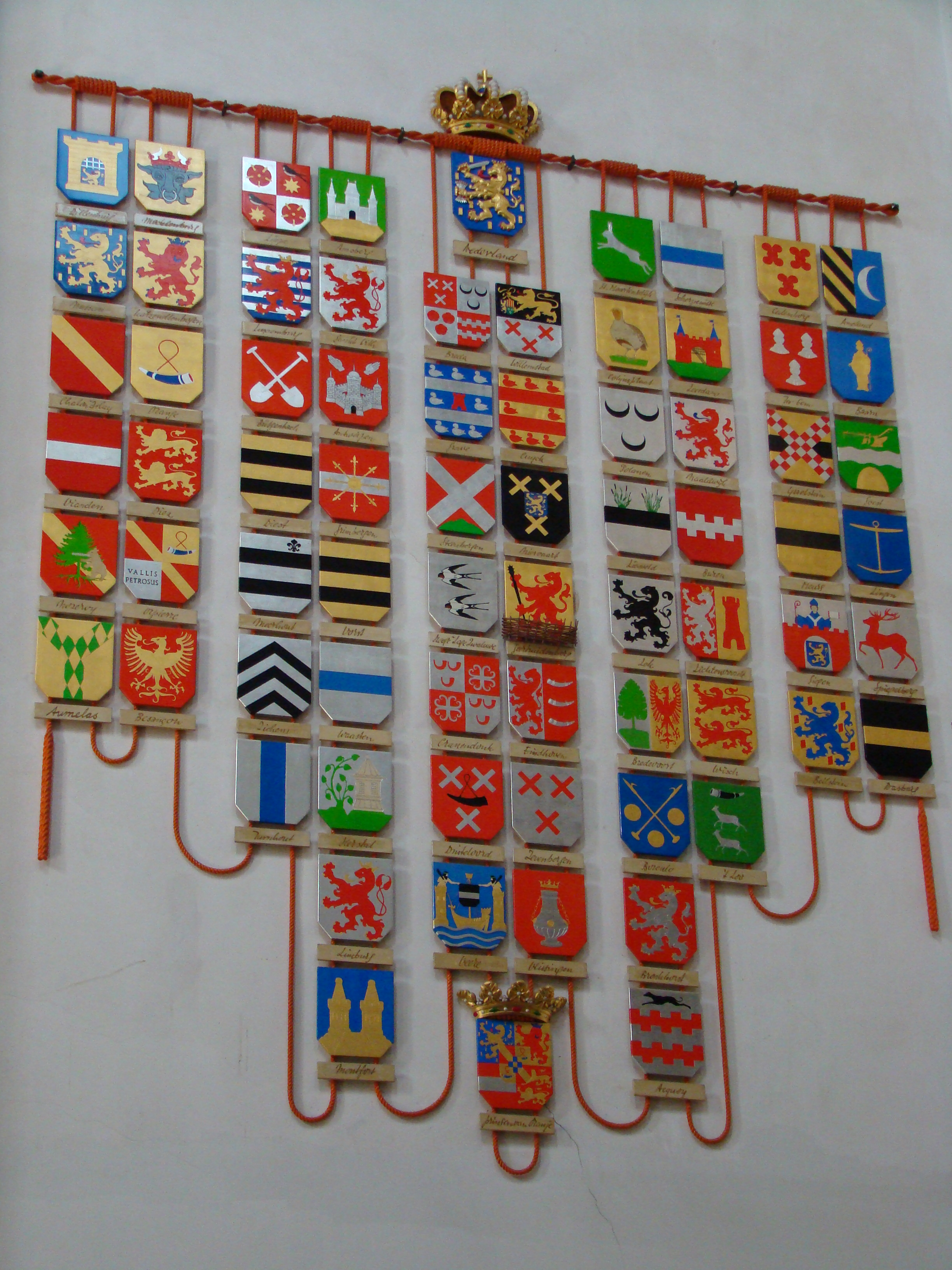
Coats of arms corresponding to the titles borne by various Dutch monarchs, including Veere and Flushing (right above the bottom crowned arms), displayed at Nieuwe Kerk in Amsterdam

Marquis of Veere and Flushing (Dutch: Markies van Veere en Vlissingen) is one of the titles of the kings and queens of the Netherlands. It was originally a Dutch title of nobility referring to the cities of Veere and Vlissingen, in the southwestern Netherlands. Holy Roman Emperor Charles V created the title in 1555 for his distant relative, Maximilian of Burgundy, who had by then ruled as Lord of Veere. After being held by the kings of Spain and England and claimed by the kings in Prussia, it definitively passed to the House of Orange-Nassau.

== History ==
=== Creation, sales and purchases ===
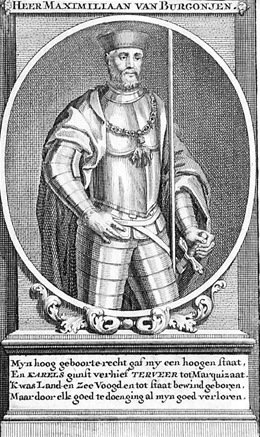
Maximilian of Burgundy

The title was granted to Maximilian of Burgundy in recognition of his 25 years of loyal service to Holy Roman Emperor Charles V, his distant relative. Maximilian was succeeded by his sister Anna's son, Maximilien de Hénin-Liétard. The new titleholder was heavily indebted and had to sell the marquisate. King Philip II of Spain, sovereign of the Netherlands, bought it in 1567. The marquisate, however, fell into arrears in its dues to the County of Zeeland (i.e., to Philip himself, as he was Count of Zeeland) due to the Dutch Revolt. In 1580, the Court of Holland and Zeeland ordered the marquisate to be sold publicly. William the Silent bought it in 1582, intending the marquisate for his second son, Maurice. Thus he also acquired two more votes in the States of Zeeland.

=== Inheritance disputes ===
William the Silent's last patrilineal descendant was King William III of England, who died in 1702. King Frederick I of Prussia and Prince John William Friso of Orange-Dietz, both cognatic first cousins of William III and great-grandsons of William the Silent, claimed the inheritance. Frederick thought himself the heir general but John William Friso was the designated heir in William III's will. Upon William III's death, the States of Zeeland refused to recognise John William Friso as Marquis of Veere and Flushing, on the grounds of his minority. In reality, they were eager to prevent anyone from ever again seizing all the power and influence that the title carried. In 1703, a group of Zeelanders took the advantage of the internal unrest and conspired to grant the marquisate to King Frederick. The States of Zeeland were informed of the conspiracy and the plan failed.

Prince John William Friso struggled to obtain the marquisate until he drowned in 1711; his widow, Landgravine Marie Louise of Hesse-Kassel, then took up the cause in the name of their son, Prince William IV of Orange, who was born six weeks after his father's death. The family sought support not only from the government of Zeeland but also from the governments of the rest of the Seven Provinces. The latter were not inclined to interfere with Zeeland's internal affairs. In 1722, the government of Zeeland was so eager to prevent William from becoming stadtholder that it started considering abolition of the marquisate. His mother and maternal grandfather, Landgrave Charles I of Hesse-Kassel, protested in vain to the States-General, executors of William III's will.

=== Abolitions and restorations ===
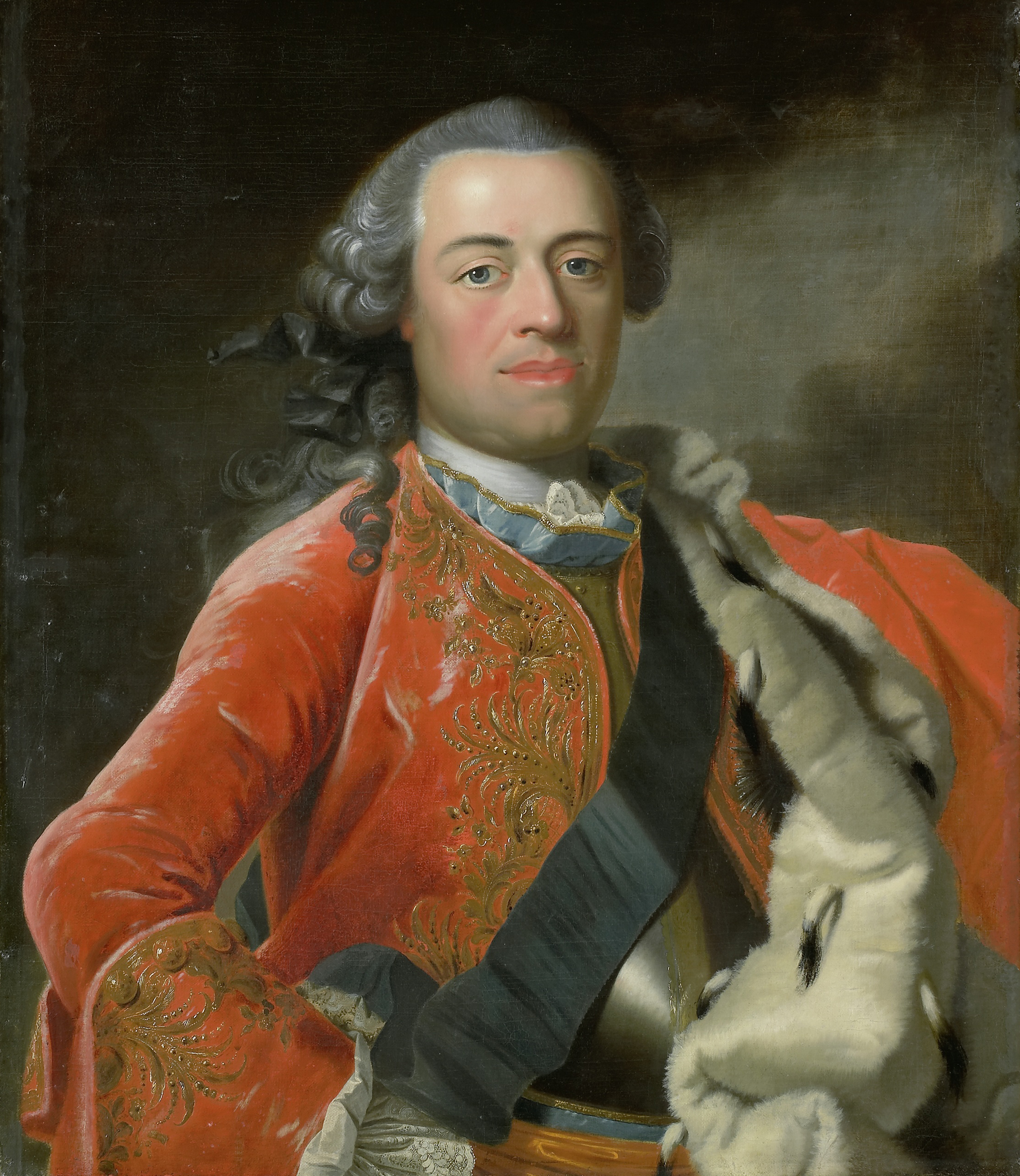
William IV of Orange

The abolition was delayed for a decade, and was only done when William IV's long dispute with King Frederick William I of Prussia over William III's inheritance came to end in 1732. According to the agreement, William IV was awarded the marquisate, but the States promptly reacted and voted "by virtue of their sovereignty and indisputable power to relieve these cities of their vassalage forever." William was outraged and refused to accept the sum of 250,000 guilders as compensation for his lost property. He was urged to agree to a compromise whereby he would be granted the marquisate as a fief of Zeeland, rather than as freehold, but did not comply. William argued that, if the marquisate was not his property, he did not understand why he was offered money for it; if it was his property, he asserted that it was not for sale. The government claimed that the marquisate was being expropriated.

In 1743, the desperate Prince William IV asked his father-in-law, King George II of Great Britain, to write a compelling letter to the States-General and threaten them with seizing Zeeland's merchants if they refused to acknowledge him as Marquis of Veere and Flushing. William, however, did not tell his father-in-law and the British ministers that the marquisate had been abolished decades ago. Angered and embarrassed, they refused to meddle with the Dutch Republic's internal politics on William's behalf ever again.

The marquisate was finally restored in 1748, when William IV managed to establish himself as stadtholder of all the Dutch provinces. It was abolished once again when the Dutch Republic was replaced with the Batavian Republic in 1795, only to be restored for the second time in 1814. Since then, it has been held by the kings and queens of the Netherlands, as one of many titles borne by the monarchs. The present holder of the title Marquis of Veere is King Willem-Alexander of the Netherlands.

== List of marquises ==
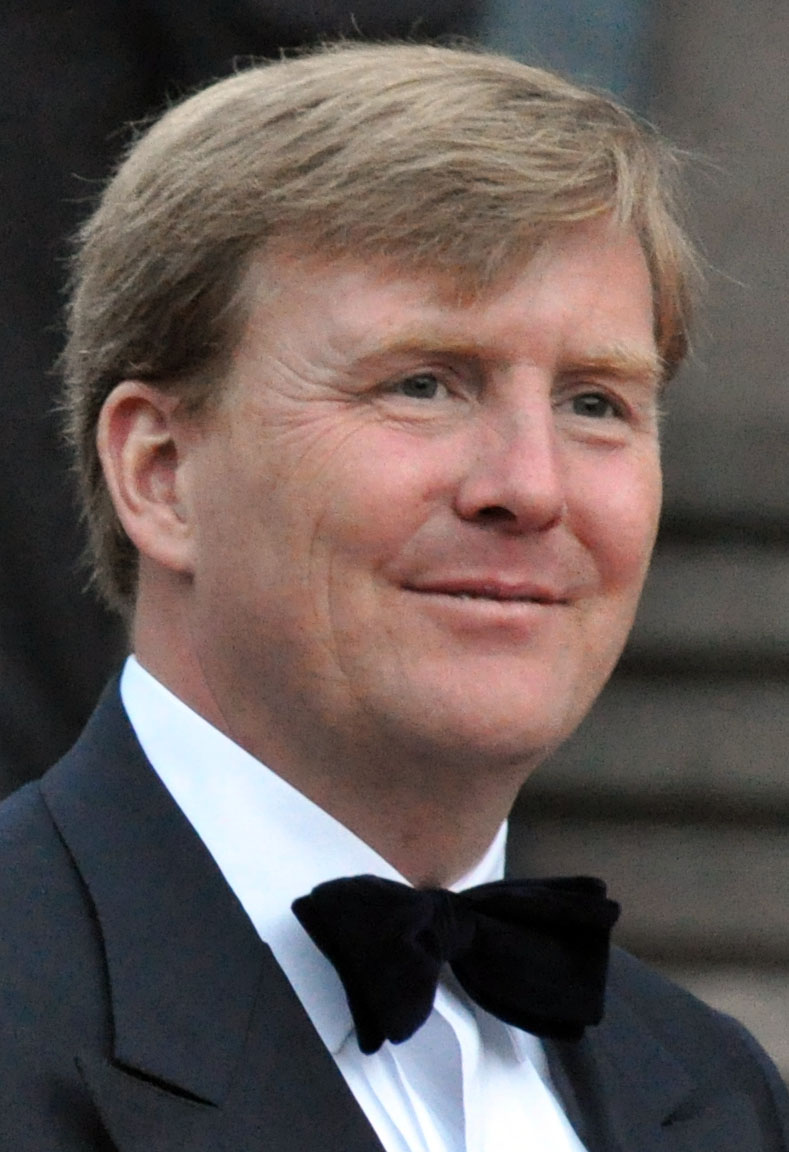
Willem-Alexander of the Netherlands

- 1555–1558: Maximilian of Burgundy
- 1558: Maximilien de Hénin-Liétard
- 1567–1582: Philip II of Spain
- 1582–1625: Maurice of Orange
- 1625–1647: Frederick Henry of Orange
- 1647–1650: William II of Orange
- 1650–1702: William III of England
- 1748–1751: William IV of Orange
- 1751–1795: William V of Orange

The title was restored as part of the full style of the Dutch sovereign, but only as a title of historic significance.

- 1814–1840: William I of the Netherlands
- 1840–1849: William II of the Netherlands
- 1849–1890: William III of the Netherlands
- 1890–1948: Wilhelmina of the Netherlands
- 1948–1980: Juliana of the Netherlands
- 1980–2013: Beatrix of the Netherlands
- 2013–present: Willem-Alexander of the Netherlands
