= Wolfert VI of Borselen =

Wolfert VI van Borselen
- Lord of Veere and Zandenburg
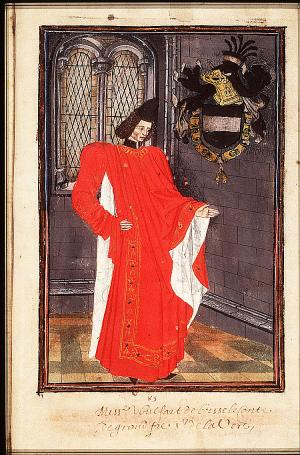
- Wolfert VI van Borselen
- Predecessor: Henry II van Borselen
- Successor: Anna van Borselen
- Born: c. 1430
- Died: 29 April 1486; Saint-Omer
- Spouses: Mary Stewart, Countess of Buchan; Charlotte de Bourbon-Montpensier
- Issue Detail: Anna van Borselen
- Father: Henry II van Borselen
- Mother: Joan van Halewijn

Wolfert VI of Borselen (c. 1430 – 29 April 1486, Saint-Omer) was stadtholder of Holland, Friesland, and Zeeland, Admiral of the Netherlands outside Flanders, and Lord of Veere.

== Family ==
Wolfert VI van Borselen was the son of Henry II of Borselen. Henry II was rich, and successfully acquired more riches. In 1452 he added Vlissingen, Westkapelle, and Domburg to his domains. Later Brouwershaven, the county of Grandpré, and the lordship of Fallais in Brabant followed.

Henry II thus succeeded in raising his stature above all others on Walcheren. In 1429 he had married Joan van Halewijn. Their oldest Albrecht died during a Prussian Crusade in 1436. Wolfert's sister Margaret married the influential Louis de Gruuthuse. Two bastards founded minor branches.

== Life ==
=== Marriages ===
In 1444 Wolfert's father Henry II arranged the marriage between his son Wolfert VI and Mary Stewart, fifth daughter of King James I of Scotland. At that time Wolfert was 14, and Mary was also still a child. By this marriage Wolfert VI became Earl of Buchan. The marriage took place at Zandenburg, the residence of the lords of Veere.

Mary died on 20 March 1465. By then Wolfert did not have a surviving son, and decided to remarry. By contract of 17 June 1468 he married Charlotte de Bourbon-Montpensier (1445–14 March 1478). She was the youngest daughter of Louis I, Count of Montpensier.

=== Fighting ===
During the Revolt of Ghent (1449–1453) Wolfert was in the army of Philip the Good in the 1452 campaign. He was in the 1452 Siege of Oudenaarde, and in a battle close to Termonde. In 1454 he assisted at the Feast of the Pheasant. In 1461 Wolfert accompanied Philip the good to the crowning of King Louis XI in Rheims. In August that year he was with the king when he solemnly entered Paris. Wolfert then became an official councilor and chamberlain of Louis XI.

In 1466 Wolfert became Admiral of the Netherlands outside Flanders (general admiral de la mer d'Artois, Boulonnais, Hollande, Zélande et Frise). Wolfert then fought alongside his father in the Wars of Liège, notable after the conquest of Dinant in the 1467 Battle of Brustem. During the Wars of the Roses Wolfert fought alongside his father at sea. In 1470 he fought against a fleet of the Earl of Warwick.

=== Succeeds his father ===
In 1468 Wolfert came into possession of all his father's goods for 4,000 pounds a year. In 1470 Wolfert van Borselen Count of Buchan, lord of Heimsrode, Avoué of Mons (a kind of legal representative) took possession of the Lordship of Fallais. Already in 1472 he used the title Lord of Fallais. In 1474 Henry II van Borselen died, and Wolfert took up all his father's titles. In 1475 Wolfert was in the Siege of Neuss.

=== Fails as stadtholder of Holland, Zeeland and Friesland ===
In 1477 Wolfert became stadtholder of Holland, Zeeland and Friesland in place of his brother in law Louis de Gruuthuse, who had to step down for not being a national of those lands. In 1478 Wolfert became a Knight of the Order of the Golden Fleece.

Wolfert failed as stadtholder. In 1477 he took Schagen Castle to imprison its lord Albrecht. However, the internal strife (or rebellion against central authority) of the late Hook and Cod wars was very strong, and Wolfert could not, or did not know how to restore order. The Cod side accused him of negligence, weakness and incapability, and urged his replacement. This was not an easy thing to do, but in 1480 Wolfert was replaced by Joost de Lalaing.

=== Conflict with Maximilian of Austria ===
After the death of Mary of Burgundy on 27 March 1482 a war with France started. On 30 August 1482 Louis de Bourbon, Bishop of Liège was assassinated by William I de La Marck. Wolfert then got into conflict with Liège again. It led to the occupation of Falais Castle, which caused him great losses.

On 2 May 1482 the states of Flanders had recognized Maximilian of Austria as regent of the children he had with Mary. Peace with France was made with the December 1482 Peace of Arras.

In January 1483, the states of Flanders then forced Maximilian to accept a tutelage council to assist him. Members were Adolph of Cleves, Lord of Ravenstein, Louis de Gruuthuse, Philip of Burgundy-Beveren, Adrien Vilain. Vilain was replaced by Wolfert shortly after. In June 1483 Maximilien confirmed the role of the council, but in October 1484 he annulled it.

In 1485 the Flemish Revolt against Maximilian of Austria led to open war between Flanders and the other provinces, who supported Maximilian. Wolfert supported Flanders. He fell in disgrace and was prosecuted in the chapter of the Golden Fleece. The Order would prolong the process after Wolfert's death, but in the end it decided to abort it.

=== Death ===
On 4 July 1485 the marriage contract between Wolfert's daughter Anna (c. 1472 – 1518) and Philip of Burgundy-Beveren (c. 1450 – 1498) was signed. In view of age difference, this might have been a measure to protect the family's possessions. Also in 1485, Isabeau de Hallewin (related to his mother?) married Louis de Joyeuse, and brought the county of Grand-Pré to her marriage.

Wolfert died at Saint-Omer in April 1486. He was buried in the chapel of Zandenburg.

== Offspring ==
With Mary Stewart, Countess of Buchan Wolfert had:

- Charles (b. 1451) died at age 13
- Jean died young

With Charlotte de Bourbon-Montpensier Wolfert had:

- Louis died young
- Anna van Borselen his successor as lord of Veere married Philip of Burgundy-Beveren, and later Louis burgrave of Montfoort
- Margaret lady of Ridderkerk
- Maria lady of Baarland married Martin of Polheim
- Jeanne inherited the Lordship of Fallais and married Wolfgang of Polheim

== Notes ==
Preceded by Henry II van Borselen	Lord of Veere; 1474–1485	Succeeded by Anna van Borselen
