= Philip of Burgundy-Beveren =

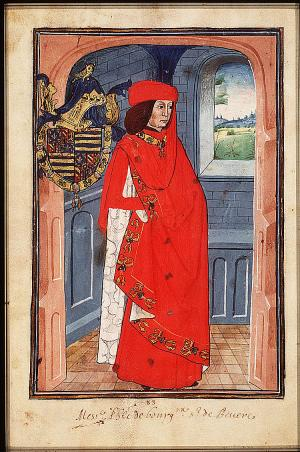
- Philippe de Bourgogne-Beveren (Knight of the Golden Fleece)
- Born: c. 1450
- Spouse: Anna van Borselen
- Issue: 4, including Adolf of Burgundy
- House: Valois-Burgundy
- Father: Antoine, bastard of Burgundy
- Mother: Marie de la Viesville

Philip of Burgundy-Beveren (c. 1450 – 1498), lord of Beveren, was a son of Antoine, bastard of Burgundy,and Marie de la Viesville. Antoine was the illegitimate son of Philip the Good and Jeanne de Presle,

== Life ==
Philip of Burgundy-Beveren married Anna van Borselen. He would thus succeed to the power of her father Wolfert VI van Borselen in Zeeland. On 31 May 1486, he became Lord of Veere in succession of Maximilian of Austria who had dismissed Wolfert in 1485 and taken over the title himself. As Lord of Veere, Philip resided at Zandenburg.

Philip of Burgundy-Beveren also succeeded Cornelis van Bergen as admiral of the Netherlands (1491–1498). He became Knight in the Order of the Golden Fleece in 1478.

== Issue ==
He had four children with Anna van Borselen.

- Adolf of Burgundy
- Anna
- Charlotte
- Anthony

== Sources ==
- Vaughan, Richard (2002). Philip the Good. Vol. 3:The Apogee of Burgundy. The Boydell Press.
- Sicking, Louis (2004). Neptune and the Netherlands: State, Economy, and War at Sea in the Renaissance. Brill.
