= Admiral of Flanders =

Military rank

Admiral of Flanders (1383–1483) and Admiral of the Netherlands (1485–1573) was a title in the medieval Low Countries for the commander of the war fleet.

The title of admiral (from the Arab emir-al-bahr), for naval commanders of ships which protected commercial convoys against piracy, already existed temporarily in the different parts of the Low Countries before, but was first made permanent in Flanders by Louis II of Flanders in 1383.

When the Burgundians gained control of the Low Countries, they also created a permanent position of admiral for the rest of the Burgundian Netherlands in 1446.

After the failed Flemish revolt against Maximilian of Austria (1482–1485), both positions were united and Philip of Cleves was appointed as first Admiral of the Netherlands.

With the start of the Dutch Revolt in 1568 and the defeat and imprisonment of the last Admiral Maximilien de Hénin-Liétard in the Battle on the Zuiderzee against the rebels, the position was abolished.

Admirals of Flanders
Jan Buuc	(1383–1389)
Jan of Cadzand	(1395?–1396)
Jan Blankaert	(1401?–1406)
Victor of Flanders	(1419 – 1424?)
John of Horne	(1436?–1436)
Simon de Lalaing	(1436–1462)
Joost de Lalaing	(1462–1483)

Admirals of the Burgundian Netherlands (without Flanders)
Jean de Luxembourg	(±1446 – 1466)
Wolfert VI of Borselen	(1466–1485)

Admirals of the Netherlands
Philip of Cleves	1485–1488
Eitel Frederick of Zollern	1488–1490
Corneille de Berghes	1490–1491
Philip of Burgundy-Beveren	1491–1498
Philip of Burgundy-Blaton	1498–1517
Adolf of Burgundy	1517–1540
Maximilian II of Burgundy	1540–1558
Philip de Montmorency, Count of Horn	1558–1567
Maximilien de Hénin-Liétard	1567–1573

== Sources ==
- Asaert, G., Bosscher, Ph.M., Bruijn, J.R., Hoboken, W.J., van et al (1976–1978): Maritieme geschiedenis der Nederlanden, De Boer Maritiem, Bussum
- Sicking, L. (1998): Zeemacht en onmacht, Maritieme politiek in de Nederlanden, 1488–1558, De Bataafsche Leeuw, Amsterdam, ISBN 9067074659
