= Adolf of Burgundy =

Lord of Veere and admiral of the Netherlands

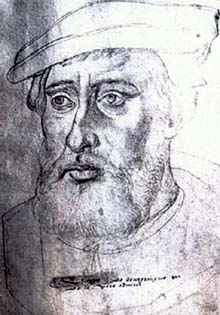

Adolf of Burgundy (1489–1540) was Lord of Veere and admiral of the Netherlands.

== Family ==
Adolf was a son of Philip of Burgundy-Beveren and Anna van Borselen. This would one day make him Lord of Veere. The family resided at Zandenburg, near Veere. He was educated by Jacob Badt, a friend of Erasmus.

== Life ==
In 1517 Adolf succeeded Philip of Burgundy-Blaton, who became Bishop of Utrecht, as admiral of the Netherlands until 1540. As admiral, he settled peacefully a conflict about fishing with the King of Denmark. As a result, he equipped some warships to protect the Dutch herring fishing fleet. In 1525 he accompanied a delegation of the Emperor to England, where he helped to conclude a treaty with France, in which the herring fishing was declared free. In 1537 Adolf became a member of the State Council.

During his life, Adolf acquired great merits around the province of Zeeland, especially in building dikes and by his tireless support for trade, shipping and traffic. On the other hand, he was a fervent supporter of the Catholic Church and therefore countered the Reformation with irreconcilable hate.

Adolf of Burgundy-Beveren also became Knight in the Order of the Golden Fleece in 1515.

=== marriage and children ===
In 1509 he married Anna of Bergen, daughter of John III of Bergen op Zoom.

Adolf and Anne had 7 children:

1. Philip, (1512–1512)
2. Maximilian II of Burgundy (1514–1558), married 1542 Louise de Croy (1524–1585), daughter of Philippe II de Croÿ
3. Anne, (1516–1551), married 1530 Jacob III of Horn (killed in 1531) and 1532 Jean V. de Hénin
4. Henry, (1519–1532)
5. Jacqueline, (1523–1556), married John II of Praet (died 1545), son of Louis of Praet and 1549 John VI of Kruiningen
6. A daughter (1526–1526)
7. Antoinette, (1529–1588) married 1549 Charles II de Croÿ (killed 1551) and 1569 Jacques d’Anneux.

== Sources ==
DBNL
