= Zanddijk =

Neighborhood of Veere, Netherlands

- Neighbourhood and former village
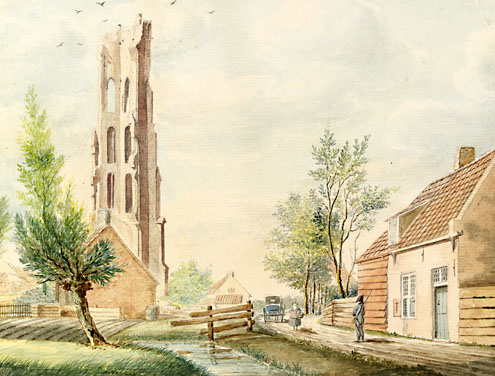
- Ruined church tower of Zanddijk (1812)

- Location in the province of Zeeland in the Netherlands Zanddijk (Netherlands)
- Country: Netherlands
- Province: Zeeland
- Municipality: Veere

Area
  - Total: 0.40 km^{2} (0.15 sq mi)
- Elevation: 3.1 m (10 ft)

Population (2021)
  - Total: 855
  - Density: 2,100/km^{2} (5,500/sq mi)
- Time zone: UTC+1 (CET)
  - Summer (DST): UTC+2 (CEST)
- Postal code: 4351
- Dialing code: 0118

Zanddijk is a neighbourhood of Veere and former village in the municipality of Veere, Zeeland, Netherlands.

== History ==
The hamlet was probably founded in the first half of the twelfth century when some local farmers went to live on a dike made of sand, for which the hamlet was named. (Zanddijk literally means "sand dike".) By 1153 Zanddijk had become a lordship. In 1247 Hendrik Wisse van Borsele inherited the lordship and had a fort constructed there. Under Van Borsele, Zanddijk grew into a wealthy village. Veere was founded on the lordship's territory and quickly grew into a city, overshadowing Zanddijk itself. In 1347 it split off from the lordship. In 1439 parts of Zanddijk were acquired by Veere and in 1574 the rest were put under its control. During the Beeldenstorm its church was damaged but not destroyed; but soon after, it was destroyed anyway. In 1572 Veere went over to the Dutch and provided troops for the Siege of Vlissingen. During the Eighty Years' War, in 1748 it counted only 416 inhabitants. During the Coalition Wars the French built fortifications around the village. In the 1930s its strategic position again saw Zanddijk the location of a line of fortification.
