= Anthony, bastard of Burgundy =

Burgundian nobleman (1421–1504)

Antoine de Bourgogne
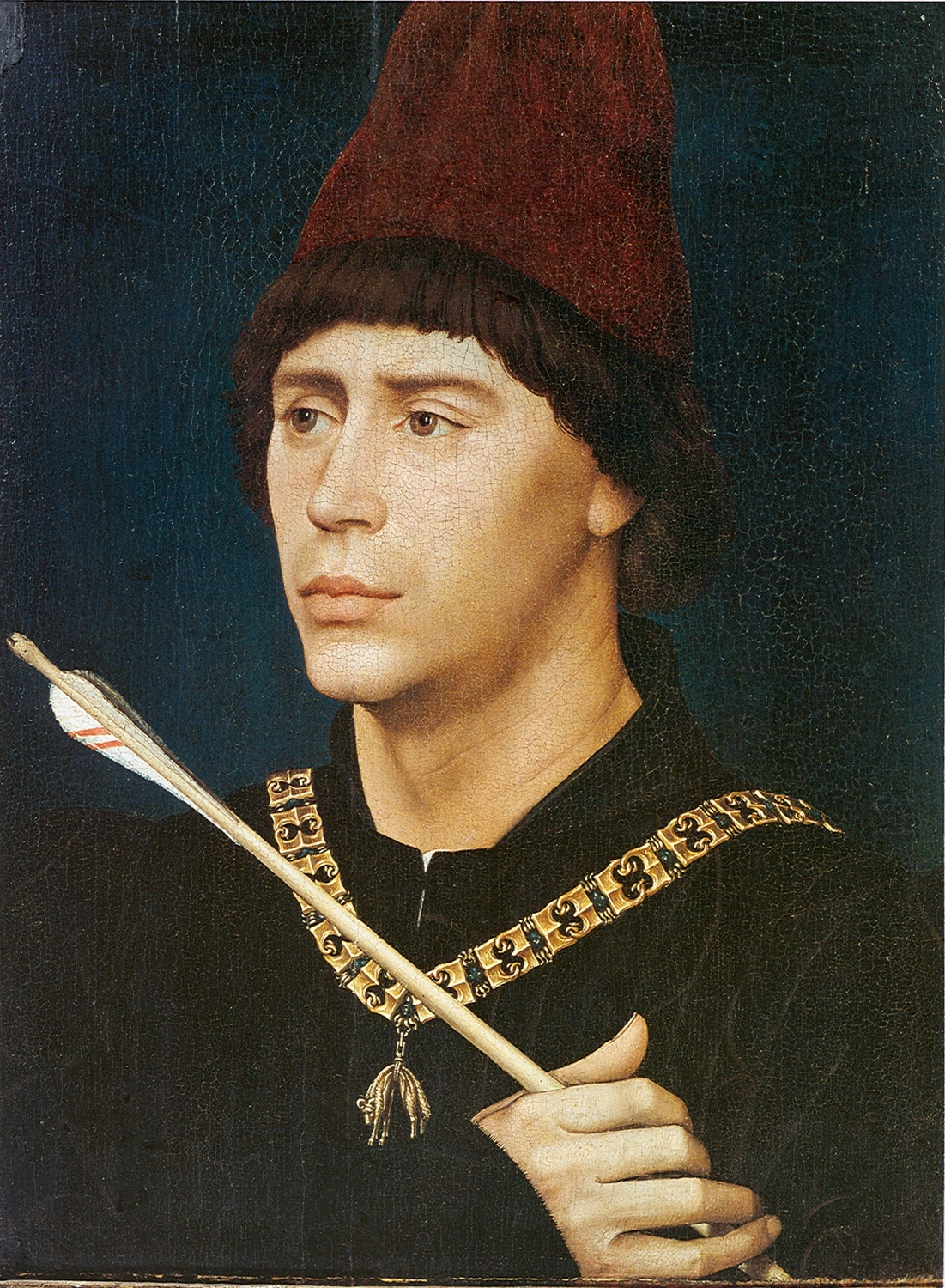
- Portrait by Rogier van der Weyden
- Born: 1421; Picardy, Burgundy
- Died: 5 May 1504 (aged 82–83); Tournehem, Calais
- Spouse: Marie de la Viesville
- Issue: Philip of Burgundy-Beveren
- House: Valois-Burgundy
- Father: Philip the Good
- Mother: Jeanne de Presle

Antoine de Bourgogne (1421 – 5 May 1504), known to his contemporaries as the Bastard of Burgundy or Le grand bâtard ("the Great Bastard"), was the natural son (and second child) of Philip III, Duke of Burgundy, and one of his mistresses, Jeanne de Presle. He was comte de La Roche (Ardenne), de Grandpré, de Sainte-Menehould et de Guînes, seigneur de Crèvecoeur, Beveren et Tournehem, and chevalier of the Golden Fleece.

He was close to his father, and then the next duke, his half-brother Charles the Bold, and spent much of his career fighting in their wars against the French and others. He was an important collector of contemporary illuminated manuscripts.

== Life ==
Born in 1421, possibly at Lizy in Picardy, he was brought up in the Burgundian court with his younger half-brother, the Count of Charolais, later Charles the Bold, last of the Valois Dukes of Burgundy, to whom he grew very close. Together with his older illegitimate half-brother Corneille of Burgundy (died 1452), he was the favourite amongst the many natural children of Philip the Good. In 1459, he married Marie de la Viesville by whom he had five children.

Anthony fought for his father on several campaigns, from at least 1451 onwards, and in 1464 left for a crusade against the Moors when he helped raise the siege of Ceuta. In 1456 he was awarded the prestigious Order of the Golden Fleece, held by only 29 others at that time. He took part in the Battle of Montlhéry (1465), when he is said to have saved the life of his half-brother, Charles, after he was separated from his men and wounded in the neck. In 1466, he was present with Charles at the siege of Dinant, and in the same year he was invited by King Edward IV for a stay in England during which he jousted against Anthony Woodville, 2nd Earl Rivers, the queen's brother, in a famous contest which spread over two days. During this visit, which extended into the summer of 1467, Anthony's father, Philip the Good, died, and Anthony had to hurry back across the channel.

After the death of his father, Anthony participated in nearly every campaign led by the new duke, his half-brother Charles the Bold, starting with the Liège campaign of 1467, when he commanded the largest contingent of 1,353 men. In 1468, Charles appointed him first Chamberlain, head of 99 other chamberlains and thirteen chaplains.

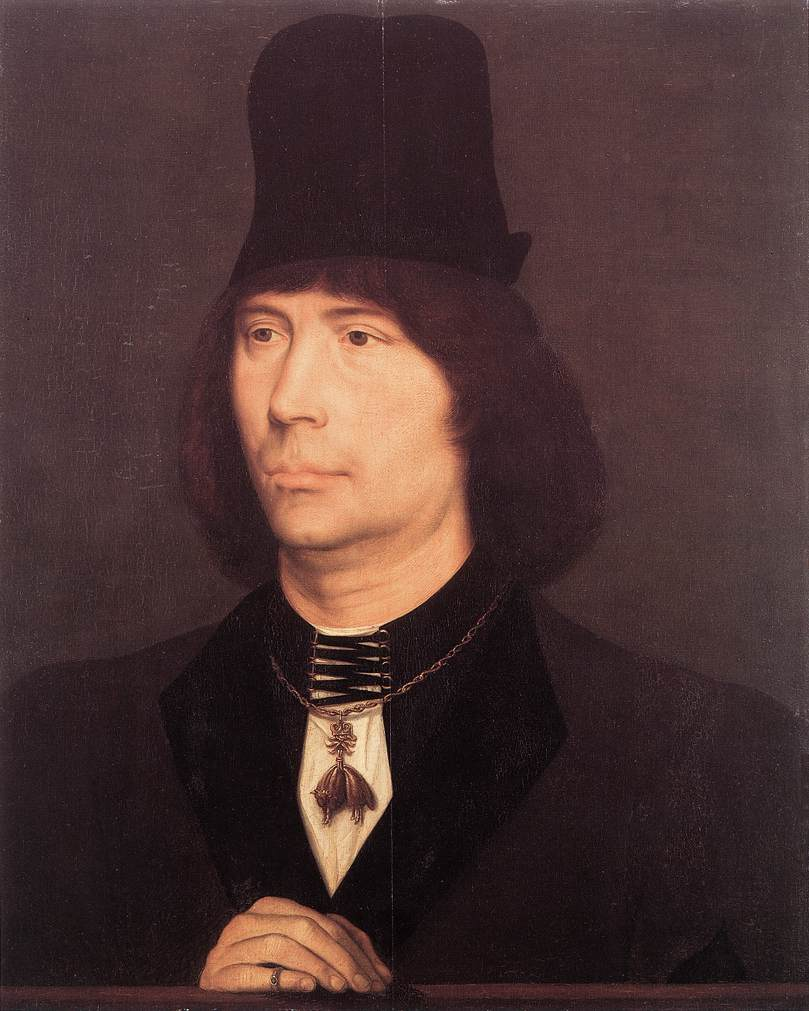
Anthony, bastard of Burgundy. Portrait attributed to Hans Memling, 1467–70.

In contrast to his rather ascetic younger half-brother Charles, it seems that Anthony inherited his father's sexual proclivities: at the chapter of the Golden Fleece held in 1468, he was castigated for his fornication and adultery, in spite of his "valour, prowess and prudence and several other good habits and virtues". But Charles trusted Anthony implicitly, and Anthony served his half-brother militarily and diplomatically with considerable success right up to the time of Charles' dramatic death at the Battle of Nancy in 1477. This loyalty was never called into question even when in 1473 he was accused by Charles of accepting a monetary gift of 20,000 gold écus from Charles' sworn enemy, Louis XI of France.

At the disastrous siege of Beauvais in 1472, Antoine reportedly lost his best jewels. In 1475, he was again sent as a diplomat to the King of England, the Duke of Brittany, the Kings of Sicily, Portugal, Aragon and Naples, and to Venice and the Pope, who received him with great honour. In the middle of these travels, he managed to find time to call in at the siege of Neuss, and later that year he participated in the conquest of the Duchy of Lorraine.

In 1476–1477, he fought alongside Charles the Bold at the three great battles of Grandson, Murten and Nancy, and was taken hostage at the end of the latter by René II, Duke of Lorraine, and delivered to the King of France, who was anxious that Burgundy should never again rebel. But Antoine had no interest in making trouble, and he offered Louis his services to help stabilize the precarious political situation. He was instrumental in arranging the marriage of Duchess Mary, his niece and only child and successor of Charles the Bold, to Maximilian of Austria.

He was a significant collector of illuminated manuscripts, mostly newly commissioned from the best Flemish illuminators and scribes. He had at least forty-five volumes, of which it is estimated that about thirty were contemporary illuminated volumes. Many volumes with his inscription of ownership survive in various libraries, notably an illustrated Froissart in four volumes. Like many other major patrons, Anthony has had an unknown illuminator he commissioned named for him – the "Master of Anthony of Burgundy" was first named in 1921, and worked in Bruges in the 1460s and 1470s for many leading bibliophiles.

The young King Charles VIII of France legitimized Anthony in 1485 and awarded him the Order of Saint Michael. He died at Tournehem near Calais in 1504.

== Arms ==
Arms of Antoine of Burgundy: arms of Bourgogne under Philip III, brisé by a cotice en barre argent.

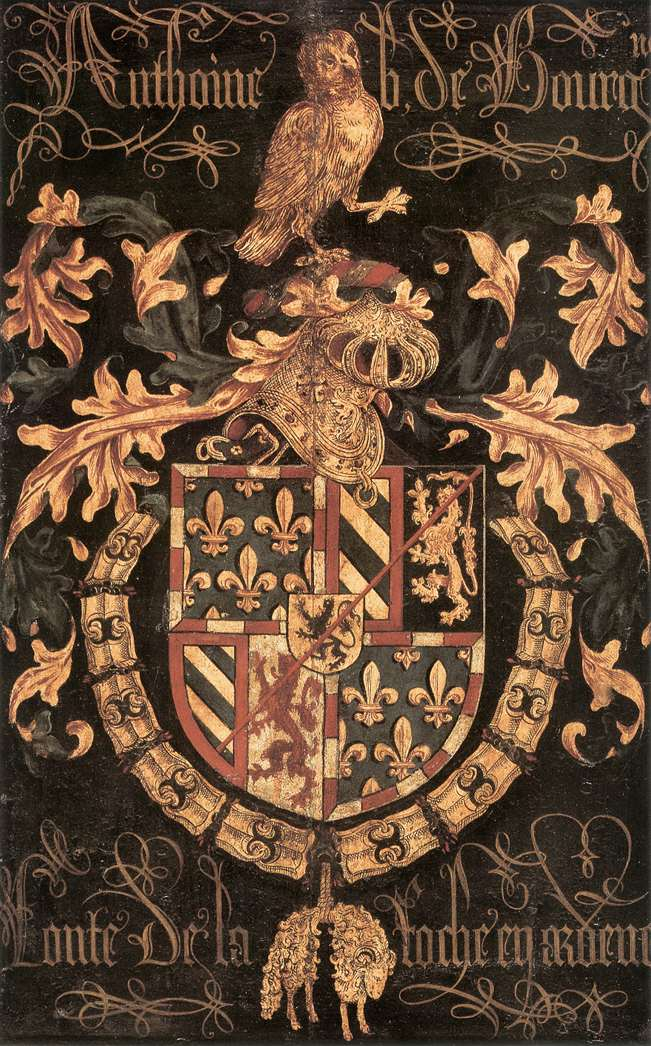
Arms of Antoine of Burgundy as painted by Pierre Coustain in St. Salvator's Cathedral in 1478.
