= Claes I van Borselen =

Son of Wolfert I van Borselen

Claes van Borselen
- Arms of Claes van Borsele
- Predecessor: Wolfert I van Borselen
- Successor: Albrecht van Borselen
- Died: 1357
- Mother: Sybille

Nicolas, Claes or Klaas van Borselen was a younger son of Wolfert I van Borselen. He founded the Van Borselen branch later known as Van Brigdamme.

== Family ==
=== A younger son ===
Claes was the fifth surviving son of Wolfert I van Borselen and his wife Sibilie. He was probably named after his great-grandfather Nicolas van Borselen. Unlike the other Van Borselens, this makes it easy to identify Claes. It is only in 1341 that a namesake, the child Claes son of Raas appears.

=== Zeeland inheritance laws ===
The County of Zeeland had different feudal inheritance laws than most other parts of the later Netherlands. Here all sons had an equal right to their parents' inheritance, instead of only the oldest son succeeding. Also, almost all the fiefs of Zeeland could only be inherited by sons, not by daughters, brothers, parents etc. This might explain why inherited fiefs often remained undivided for years.

== Life ==
=== 1299: Claes' father is killed ===
Claes' father Wolfert was killed in Delft on 1 August 1299. Right after the assassination, a number of his allies, as well as his younger sons Frank and Claes were imprisoned in Holland. John II, Count of Holland (1247-1304), regent for John I, Count of Holland (1284- 10 November 1299), was then said to have made a reconciliation between the Van Borselens and the killers.

Later that year Frank and Claes were allowed to leave their prison under guarantee from their allies that they would soon be delivered back. On 26 September 1299 knights Raas van Borselen and Floris van Borselen and others bailed for them. On 11 October 1299 Frank and Claes van Borselen had to repeat these promises. At that moment, Frank and Claeys were in prison in Haarlem. Also on 11 October Jan Mulart van Borselen gave the guarantee that he would return to his prison in Delft, and would deliver Frank and Claas children of his brother Wolfert, and Pieter son of Floris.

In 1300 the events led to war between the Count of Holland and the Van Borselen clan, in which Flanders became involved. In Veere the Van Borselens captured some of the killers of Wolfert I, and executed them. The war led to the 1304 Battle of Zierikzee, and was part of the Franco-Flemish War which lasted from 1297 to 1305.

In 1303 Claes was mentioned in the last will of his older brother Sir Hendrik Wisse van Borselen, knight.

=== 1308: Reconciliation with the count of Holland ===
In 1308 the Van Borselen branch of Wolfert II van Borselen, to which Claes belonged, was reconciled with William I, Count of Hainaut.

In May 1309 there was a reconciliation about Wolfert I's death in 1299, and the execution of some of his killers by the Van Borselens at Veere in 1300. Of Wolfert I's four sons who lived 1309, Wolfert and Floris were mentioned as knights, Frank and Claes as squires. On the opposing side were: Philips van Duvenvoorde, Philips van Zanthorst, Wouter van Haerlem, Simon van Benthem, Philip Voerness, Vriesen van der Mye, etc. These had to pay 1,000 pounds to the Van Borselens. On the other side, the Van Borselens had to pay 3,000 pounds for the events at Veere.

=== Division of his father's estate ===
On 30 May 1316 Wolfert II made a contract about his grandfather's estate with his brothers Sir Florence, Frank and Claes van Borselen. This also involved some of the dower of the Catharina de Durbuy, Lady of Voorne, second wife of Wolfert I. Claes and the others got 20 pounds a year, but this would become 120 pounds a year after the death of the Lady of Voorne. For this, Claes had to wait some time, because Catharina de Durbuy died on 26 September 1328.

=== Building an estate ===
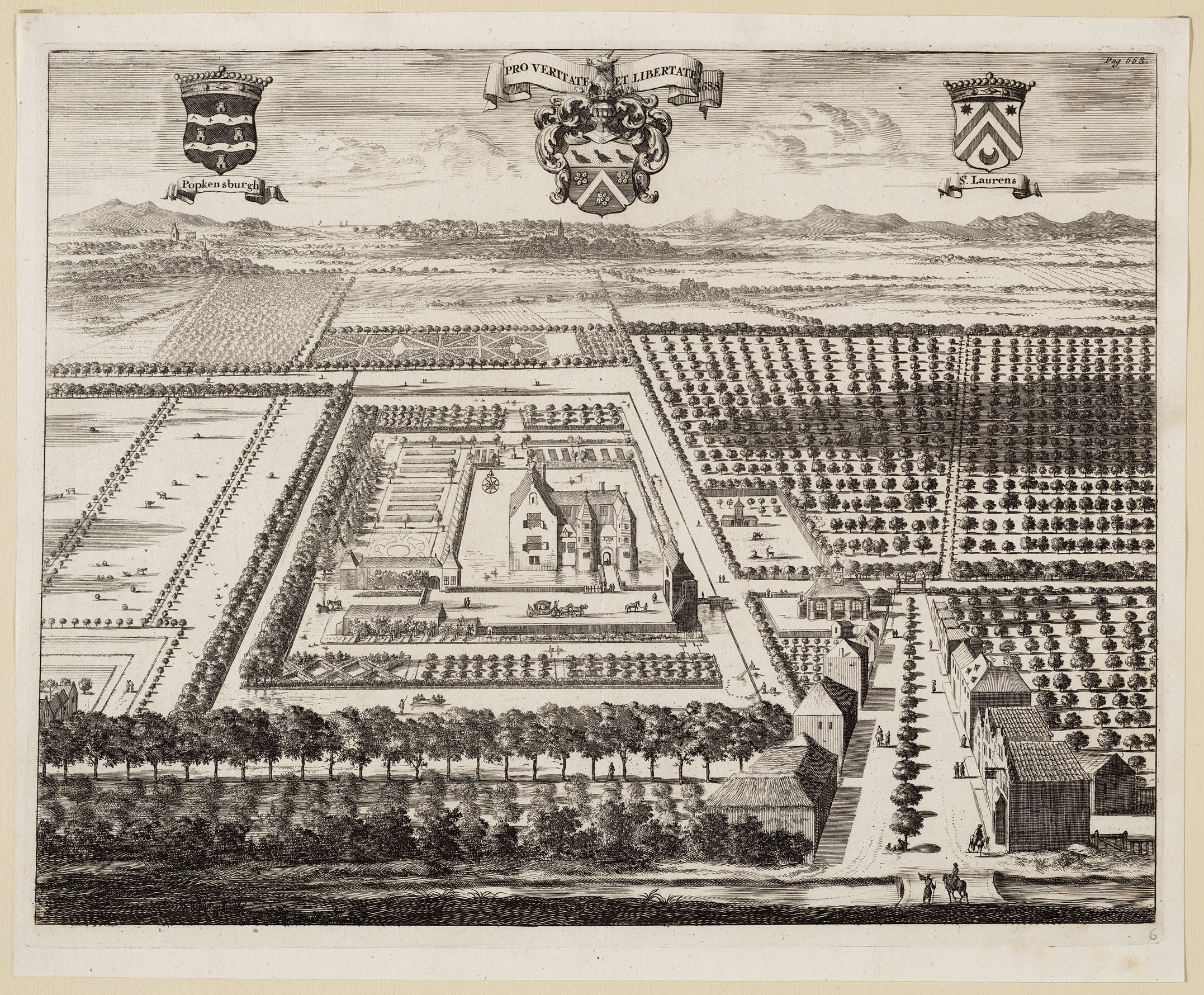
Popkensburg Castle

Claes' must have acquired his first possessions in the Lordship of Popkensburg in the early 1330s. In 1331/3 Claes, his brother Floris, and Wolfert III van Borselen each owned 118 gemet (a surface measure) of the lordship, which totaled 1044 gemet. By 1351/4 Floris' part had been divided over Claes and Wolfert, and these each owned 177.5 gemets. By 1366/9 Claes' son Gerard was the only Van Borselen in Popkensburg, and owned just 156.5 gemet. Indeed, in 1340 Claes owned more land in Zanddijk, i.e. 640 gemets.

In 1551 Reygersberg remarked that in the 1350s, Claes was richest lord of Walcheren. He (wrongly) dubbed him Lord of Brigdamme, Zoutelande and Koudekerke, and founder of Popkensburg Castle in the lordship of Sint Laurens. Also as founder of the church of that lordship. Reygersberg said that his possessions amounted to a third of Walcheren. Reygersberg's statements could hardly be verified. Henri Obreen noted that in 1317 Claes had land in Zandijk, and in 1331 in 's-heer Alardskerke (Serooskerke).

Adriaan Meerkamp van Embden solved the puzzle. He noted that during Claes' lifetime, not a single Van Borselen owned land in Brigdamme. The first to do so was Claes' son Gerard. Therefore, Claes was not lord of Brigdamme. Claes I's grandson Claes II did own two-thirds of Brigdamme in the 1390s. Obviously Claes II had been confused with his grandfather. Meerkamp van Embden also annulled the claim that Claes I had founded Popkensburg Castle. All this cut Claes down to size, but the fact that two wealthy Van Borselen branches sprang from Claes does make it likely that Claes amassed quite some wealth.

Claes is known to have lived at West-Souburg Castle in his later years.

=== The feud with the Van Haamstedes ===
In 1342 Claes was first mentioned as a knight.

Shortly after 1345, the Van Borselen branch that was centered on Walcheren led by Wolfert III van Borselen, were in a feud with the Van Haamstedes, who were centered on Schouwen. At the time, the Van Haamstedes in the person of Floris I van Haamstede (d. 1345) had been encroaching on the Van Borselen power base by gaining territory on South Beveland.

During the feud Arnoud van Haamstede, and a Wolfert the bastard van Borselen were killed.

=== The Hook and Cod Wars ===
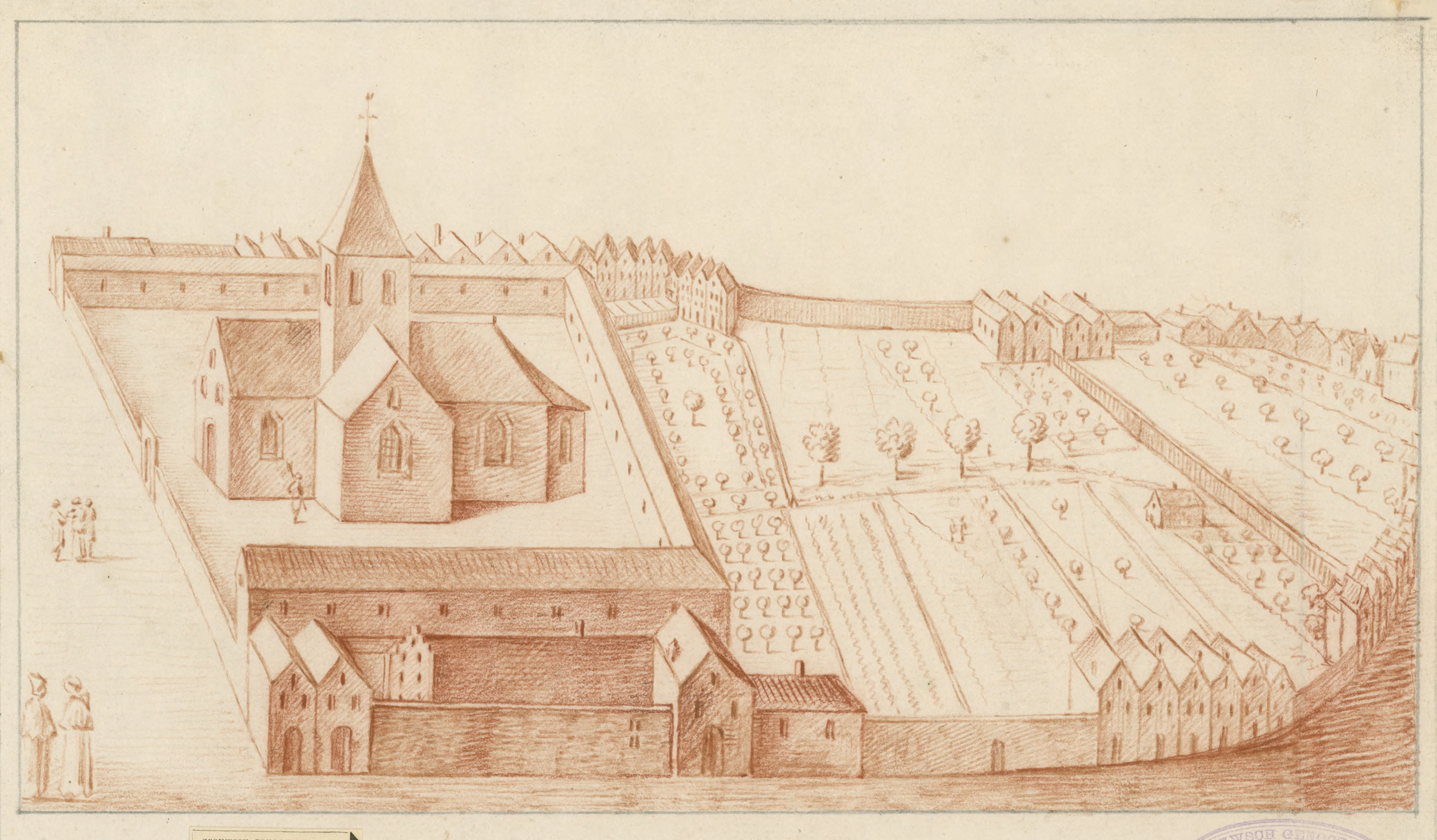
The Franciscan convent in Middelburg.

During the Hook and Cod wars, Claes pledged loyalty to Margaret II, Countess of Hainaut in January 1351. Next Margaret tried to reconcile the feud between the Van Borselen and Van Haamstede family in February 1351. Her verdict might have been the reason for the Van Borselen family to rebel against Margaret. The rebellion led to the lost May 1351 Battle of Veere, but there are no indications that this defeat had any serious consequences for the Borselens. Soon after, William V was victorious as count of Holland. The Van Borselens had gambled on the winning side.

=== Final years ===
In 1353 Claes became involved in the creation of the Oosterland polder on Duiveland. This was a major enterprise, which might have contributed to the wealth of his descendants.

Claes favored the Franciscan (Tertianen) convent of Middelburg. He gave it many gifts, and was buried there in 1357.

== Marriage and offspring ==
Claes was married to Jean van Zandijk en Zevenbergen. She died 17 May 1363 and was probably a daughter of Hugeman van Zevenbergen. They had multiple sons:

- Wolfert van Borselen. Mentioned as Heren Claes Sonen van Borselen in 1351.
- Hugeman van Borselen. Mentioned as Heren Claes Sonen van Borselen in 1351.
- Gerard van Borselen, not much is known about him, except that he was a brother of Floris.
- Albrecht van Borselen (†1390), father of Claes II lord of Brigdamme. Obreen did not find any proof of his existence.
- Floris I van Borselen (†1368), Lord of Sint-Maartensdijk, resided at Sint-Maartensdijk Castle.
- Frank van Borselen (†1386), succeeds his brother as lord of Sint-Maartensdijk after 1368
- Raas of Raso van Borselen (†1390), Lord of Ellewoutsdijk
