= Floris I van Borselen =

Dutch noble

- Lord of Sint-Maartensdijk
- Arms of Floris van Borselen
- Predecessor: Claes I van Borselen
- Successor: Frank van Borselen (1320-1386)
- Died: 1368
- Mother: Jenne or Johanna van Zevenbergen

Floris I van Borselen Florens de Bersalia was lord of Sint-Maartensdijk and Sint-Maartensdijk Castle, the count's lieutenant in Zeeland and keeper of the seal of Holland.

== Context ==
=== Family ===
Floris was the fourth son of Claes I van Borselen (a.k.a. Nicolas), and Joan van Zevenbergen. He was also a grandson of Wolfert I van Borselen.

As his father Claes was the fourth surviving son of Wolfert I, one might expect that Floris would not get a rich inheritance. However, in the end Floris did leave a very rich estate, probably due to his career in the service of the counts of Holland.

=== The Hook and Cod Wars ===
During the Hook and Cod wars, Knight Claes I van Borselen and his sons pledged loyalty to Margaret II, Countess of Hainaut in January 1351. At the same time Claes and his sons Wolfert and Hugeman promised to submit to a verdict that Margaret II, Countess of Hainaut would give about the killing of Arnoud van Haamstede. On 6 February 1351 this verdict was given. The verdict might have been a reason for the Van Borselen clan to rebel against Margaret shortly after, and to choose the side of William I, Duke of Bavaria, who would become known as Count William V.

What is interesting, is that Claes' other sons were not mentioned. This might have been due to them being too young, when Arnoud van Haamstede was killed about four years earlier, or that they were simply not involved.

The Van Borselen rebellion on Walcheren failed to achieve decisive results, because the Van Borselens lost the Battle of Veere in late May 1351. However, the war was decided in William's favor in the July 1351 Battle of Zwartewaal. Afterwards there are no more references to Claes's oldest son Wolfert and to his son Hugeman, while both were mentioned some years earlier. One might suppose that they lost their life in the fighting.

Anyway, after the fight those that had sided with William were rewarded. The losers lost their fiefs. As a consequence of the December 1354 peace, most of these lands were restored, but somehow this did not apply to everything.

=== Multiple Floris van Borselens in Floris' early life ===
There were multiple Floris van Borselens in the 1340s and 1350s, which were indeed close relatives of our Floris. Obreen thought that both namesakes of our Floris van Borselen died in about 1345. These he mentions as knight (in 1342) 'Floris van Borselen the younger' son of Rase van Borselen lord of Kortgene, and 'Floris van Borselen van Veere' knight in 1309.

He therefore had that our Floris first appeared as knight Floris van Borselen on 5 January 1349. He would then also be the same as knight Florens van Borselen who swore loyalty to Margaret together with Claes van Borselen on 18 January 1351.

The assumption that our Floris van Borselen was the only one with that name after 1345, does not stand up to scrutiny. On 21 October 1354 an account was read in Middelburg to: Floris van Borselen the elder, and Floris van Borselen son of Claes. This proves that Floris van Borselen the elder was still around nine years later. This Floris the elder was also known as Floris van Veere.

Floris van Borselen the younger was also still around in 1351. On 15 October 1351 there is a Floris van Borselen the younger juvenis in the count's council. In November and December 1351 Lord Floris van Borselen is also noted. One can wonder whether the label 'the younger' could have been re-used for our Floris after the death of a previous 'the younger'. This is not the case, because in July 1354 we have in one document: Floris van Borselen son of Rase, Floris van Borselen son of Claes, and Hendrik van Borselen. What is likely, is that after our Floris appeared alongside the other two, the clerks stopped using the label 'the younger' for the son of Rase, because it became confusing.

== Life ==
=== Floris I van Borselen appears ===
The first undisputable mention of our Floris van Borselen is from July 1352, when he is mentioned as Knight Floris van Borselen son of lord Claes. The reference as Floris van Borselen son of Nicolas is rather consistent. In April 1353 there is a reference to Knight Floris van Borselen and Knight Floris van Borselen son of Claes. In January 1354 this is repeated.

=== Keeper of the seal ===
Count William V of Holland had two seals. A small or secret seal which was attached to regular letters, mostly on paper. The regular or great seal, which was indeed bigger, was attached to open letters, or charters meant for a larger audience. On 12 February 1353 Floris van Borselen son of Claes was entrusted with keeping this great seal. At that time he was also bailiff of Zeeland Beoosterschelde. Floris gave the seal back on 26 July 1353. A detail about this phase is that the period that he guarded the great seal was in succession to the last period that his father was keeper of the seal.

In March and April 1357 Floris was found as keeper the seal in Zeeland. At about this time, the use of the seal had become irregular, which is ascribed to the first signs of madness of William V. At a certain moment Floris got his hands on both seals of William V, and refused to hand them to Regent Albert.

=== On the count's council ===
In June 1356 our Floris was one of the few who sealed the peace with Utrecht, still as son of Claes. In Jun 1356 He was on the count's council. On 29 March 1357 "Floris van Borselen lord of Sint-Maartensdijk" was on the council of the count. As such he was important in making peace with the Duchy of Brabant. By this peace Heusden came to Holland.

=== Acquires Sint-Maartensdijk Castle ===
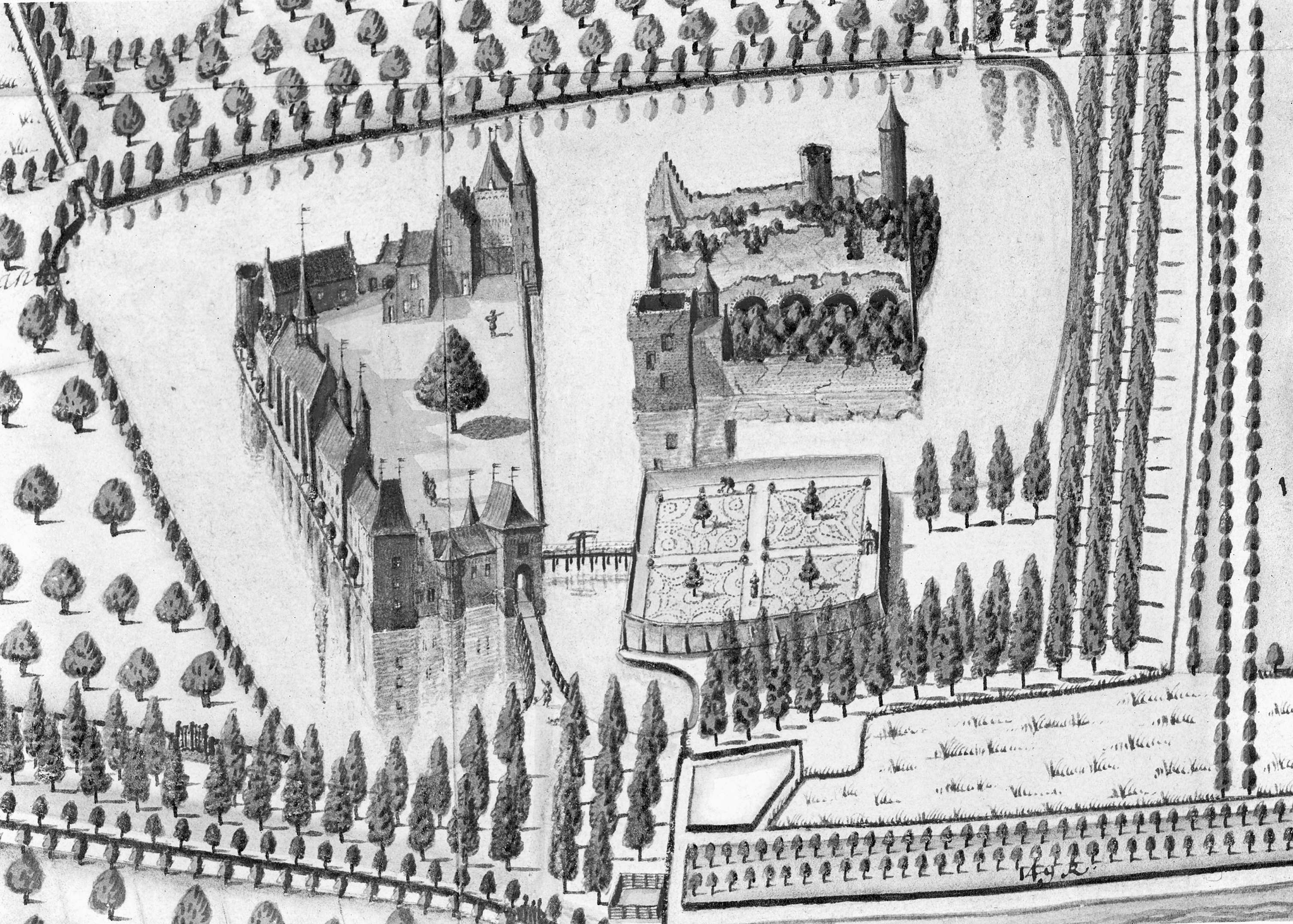
Sint-Maartensdijk Castle

On 10 January 1354 Floris van Borselen bought 1600 gemeten of land, which had reverted to the county after the death of Pieter son of Gheront. He also bought 900 gemeten which had had been Pieter's son Jan had lost due to 'treason'. In 1355 Count William V confirmed Floris' possession of these lands, lordships, mills, and tithes. The lands centred on Sint-Maartensdijk and Sint-Maartensdijk Castle. In 1357 Floris was mentioned as Lord of Sint-Maartensdijk.

However that might be, in January 1359 the children of Pieter son of Gheerlof still owned part of the goods. At the time (after the surrender of Heusden) the count offered Floris to make a division of these goods. For these one can think of the goods of Jan having come back to him after the December 1354 peace, or those of other children.

Whatever these details, in the end Floris got possession of the castle and lands. It became a prestigious castle under his successors.

=== Castellan of Heusden ===
In gratitude for this service with regard to the peace with Brabant, Floris became castellan and lord of the land of Heusden for life. He is mentioned as Borchsaet in August 1357. A such Floris was in control of Heusden Castle, which was an exceptionally strong castle. Floris was also referred to as burgrave, which was a prestigious title.

=== Besieged in Heusden ===
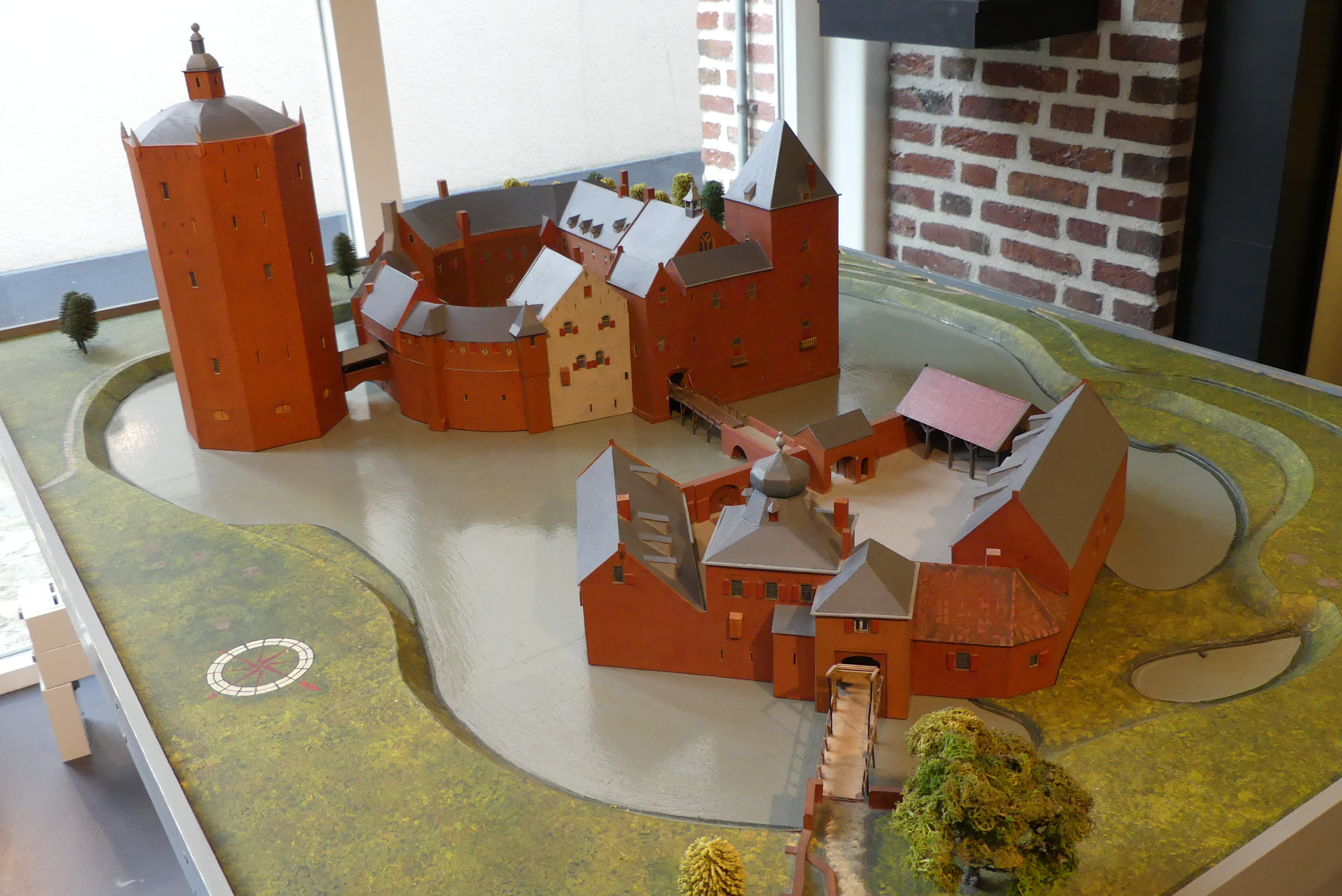
Heusden Castle

In late 1357 Count William V became insane and dangerous. He was locked up, and in February 1358 his younger brother Albert I, Duke of Bavaria arrived in Holland to take up the regency. Albert started his regency by appointing a Hook lord as bailiff of Kennemerland. Also in 1358, Floris came into conflict with Middelburg. Albert then dismissed him as councilor on 2 September 1358.

The appointment in Kennemerland also led to a failed attempt to assassinate this lord. The perpetrators fled to Heemskerk Castle, which the count's forces besieged from 4 December 1358 to 24 March 1359. Meanwhile, the Cod city of Delft rebelled and was besieged from 1 April 1359 to mid June. Afterwards, some Hook lords fled to Heusden Castle, where they were apparently received by Floris van Borselen.

Heusden Castle was besieged from 1 September 1358 to 20 February 1359. At the surrender, Floris handed back both seals of Holland, which were subsequently broken. Other items of William V that Floris handed to Albert were all kinds of letters and charters, jewelry, Albert's body armor, and all other things he held from him. The reconciliation between Floris and Regent Albert and Machteld had taken place somewhat earlier, on 25 January 1359. By this reconciliation he would get 10,000 Bruges shields for what he had improved locally.

Shortly after, on 17 March 1359, the conflict between the Van Borselen clan and allies, and Middelburg was judged by Regent Albert. Both sides had to pay 10,000 Bruges shields.

=== Later career ===
In 1362 Floris was again on the count's council. In May 1362 Floris was ruwaard of Zeeland when the count made a trip to Aragon. In late 1365 Floris van Borselen lord of Sint-Maartensdijk was appointed as Stadthouder of Zeeland. The only limitation was that he should not allow banished or exiled people to gain land.
