= Sint-Maartensdijk Castle =

- Kasteel van Sint-Maartensdijk
- Sint-Maartensdijk, Zeeland the Netherlands
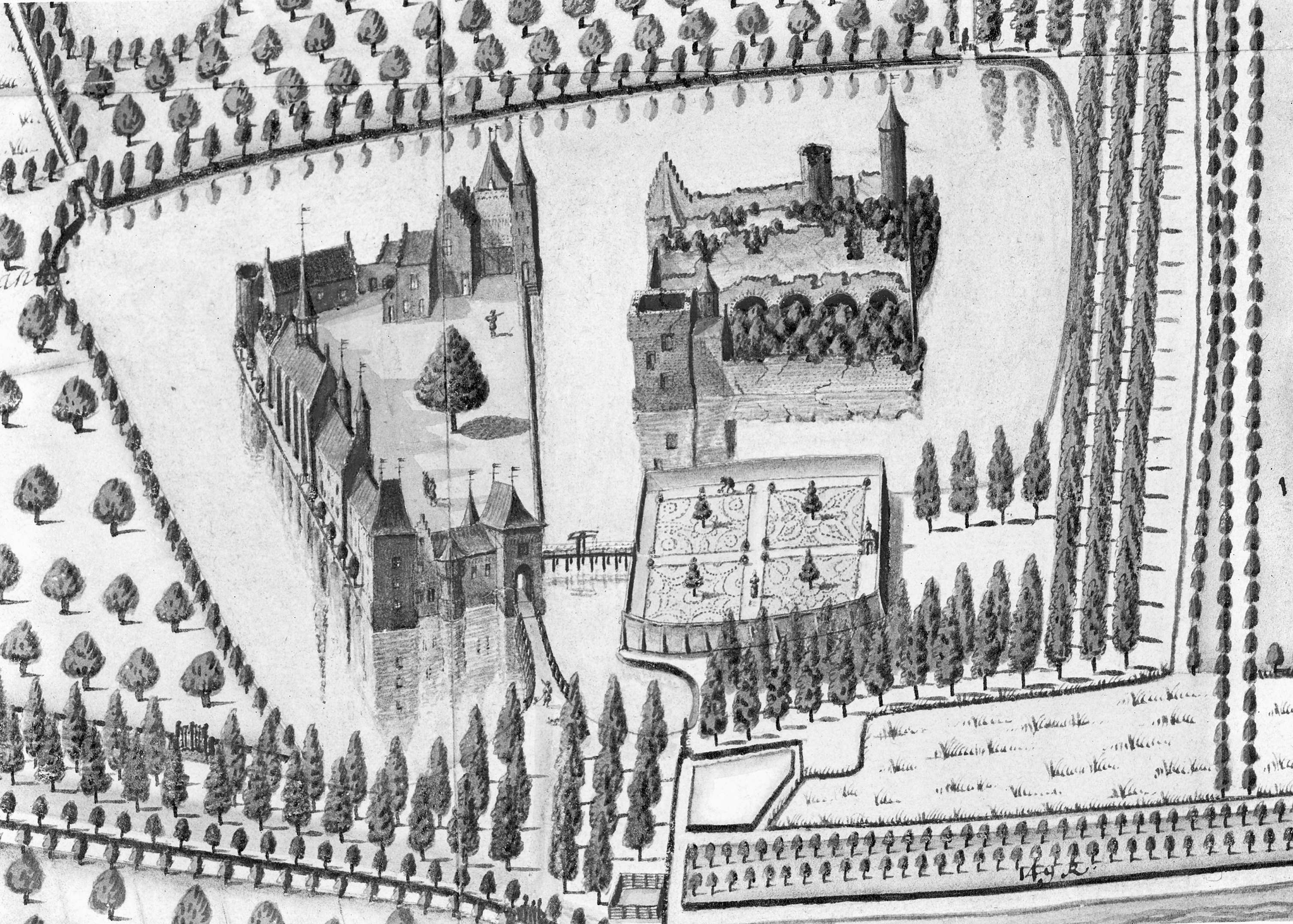
- Sint-Maartensdijk Castle

Site information
- Type: Water castle
- Open to the public: No
- Condition: Terrain with part of the moats

Location
- The Netherlands
- Location within Zeeland
- Coordinates: 51.552326°N 4.077153°E

Site history
- Built: 13th century
- Materials: brick
- Demolished: Main castle:From 1710; Outer-bailey:1820; Last fragment:1963

Sint-Maartensdijk Castle was a castle with a rich history. Except for a part of the moats nothing remains of it.

== Location and name ==
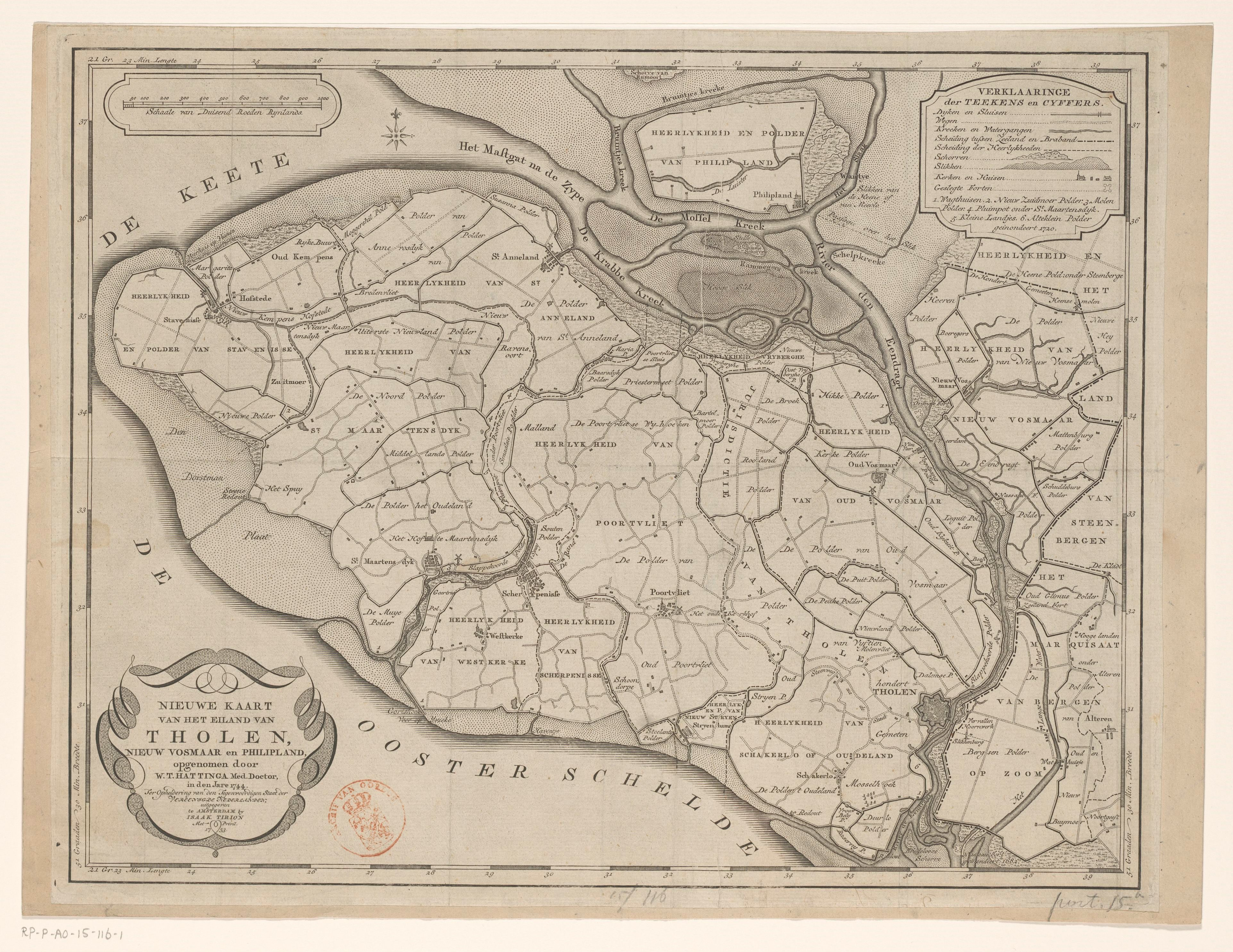
Old map of Tholen

The village Sint-Maartensdijk is located in the Oudelandpolder on the island Tholen. This is the oldest polder west of the Pluimpot, which is the old trench that used to split Tholen in two. The old map of Tholen shows Sint-Maartensdijk, the Oudelandpolder and the Pluimpot just southwest of its center. The Pluimpot used to be named Borden. Therefore, the oldest name of the area around Sint-Maartensdijk was Overbordene, meaning 'Over the Borden'.

The village of Sint-Maartensdijk was previously named Haestinge. Some say this referred to a hare haas which is also on the old coat of arms of the village. Others say that Haestinge comes from 'Haast-Ee', another old name for the Pluimpot. Anyway, the inhabitants of Haestinge were mentioned as such in 1357. After 1357 a new church was founded dedicated to Martin of Tours, and the village was renamed accordingly. In 1485 the village became a small city, and was fortified.

Sint-Maartensdijk Castle is thus named after the village which became a town. It stood about a hundred meters north of the city walls. At present, the terrain is on the limits of the village, and borders a cemetery and a parking lot which was constructed over part of its western outer bailey.

== Castle Characteristics ==
=== First phase ===
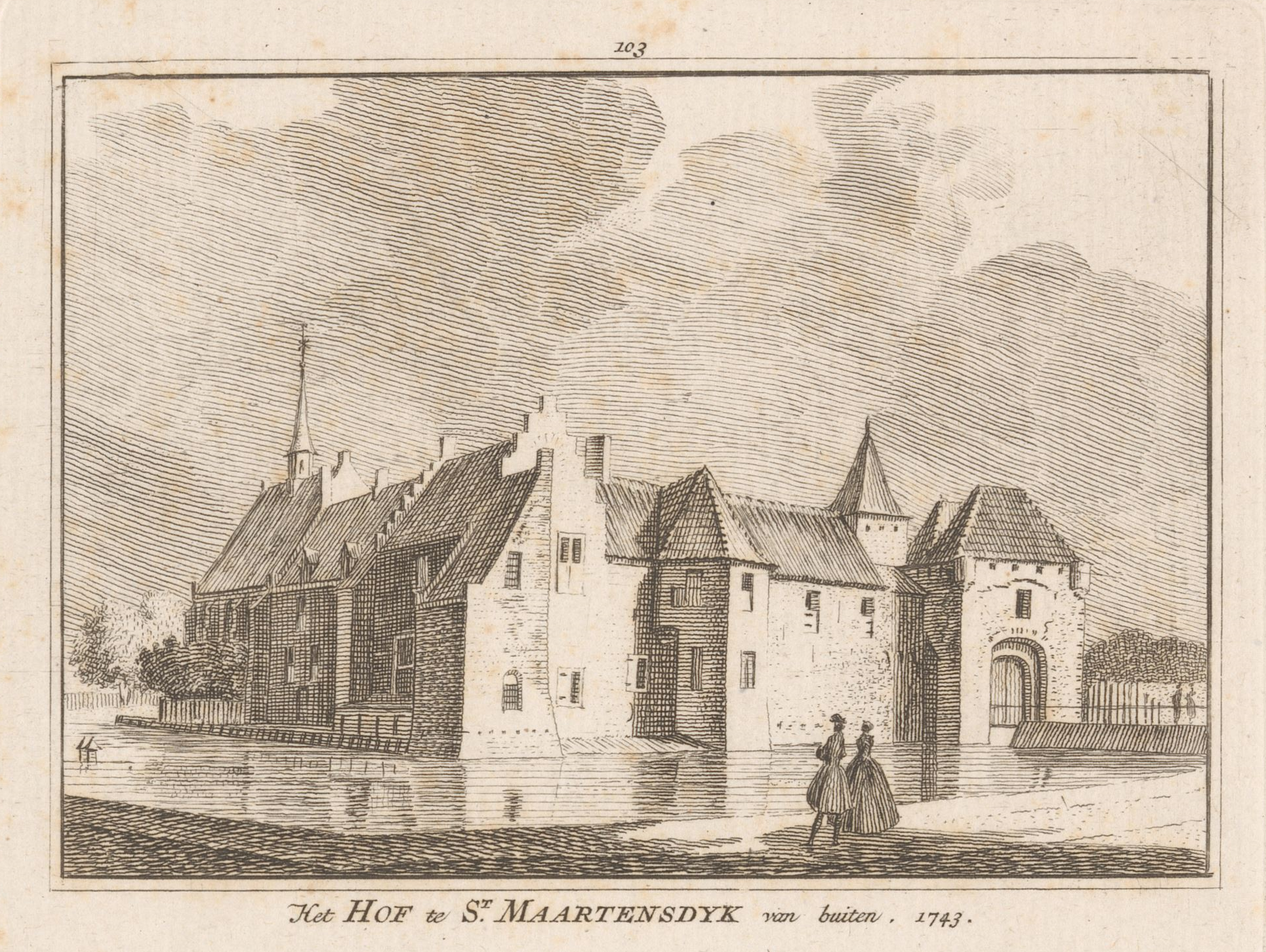
Outer bailey from the east

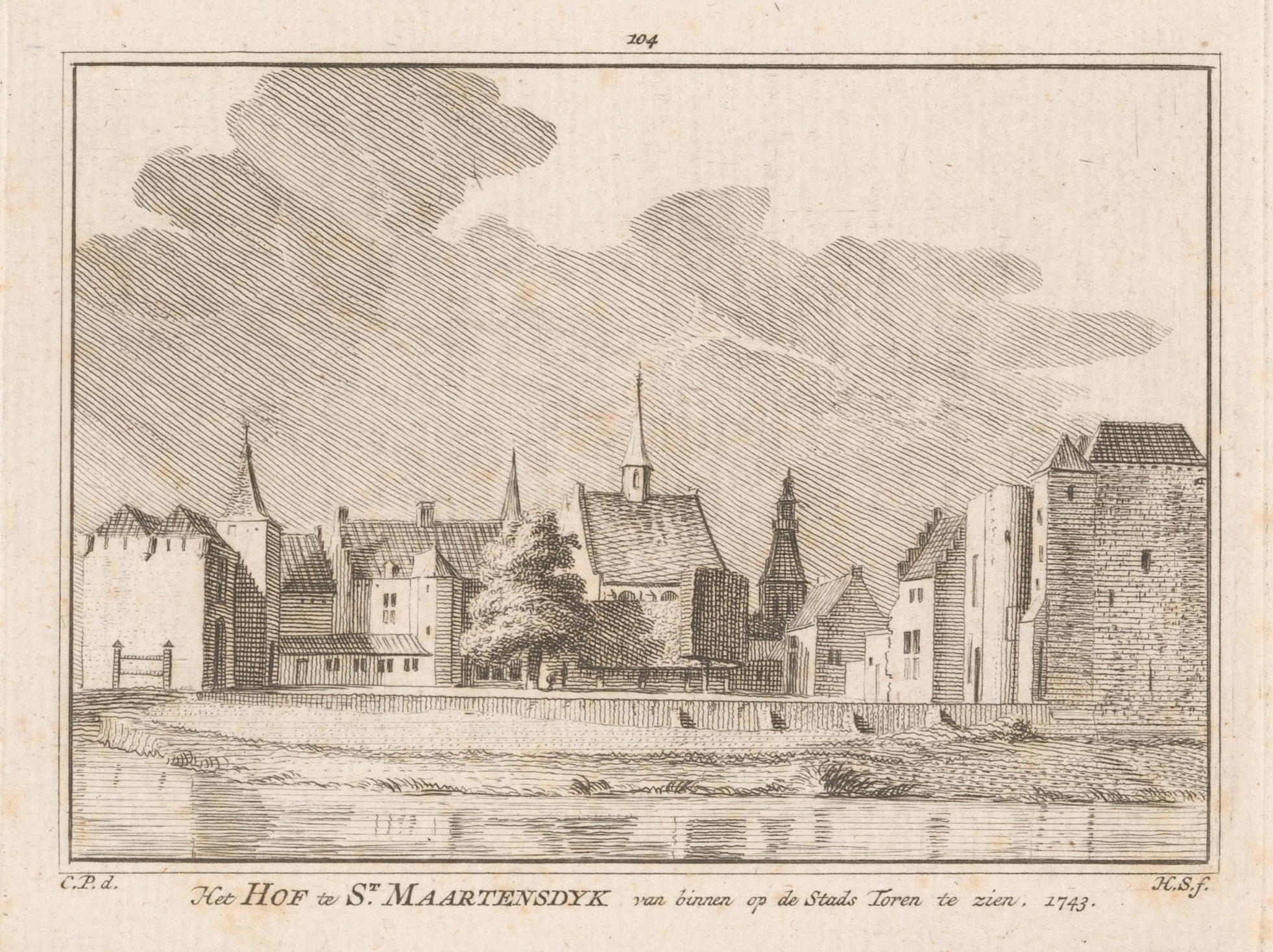
Outer bailey from the north

In its first phase Sint-Maartensdijk Castle consisted of a solitary tower house with a water well inside. The walls of this tower house were 2.5 m thick on average. This tower might have been built on the same location as the 13th century residence of its first known owners, the Van Overbordene family. However, these might just as well have had their castle on one of the nearby mottes. Some late thirteenth century mottes were located near Sint-Maartensdijk, and indeed contained medieval brick.

=== Second phase ===
During the second phase, the Van Bordenes expanded the tower house to a water castle. It was an irregular square with four or five semi-circular towers, and two smaller towers, all at irregular intervals.

This was also the phase during which the outer-bailey got a wall with a protected walkway on brick arcs. It is not clear whether the two big gatehouses of the outer bailey belong to this second phase or the next, third phase.

=== Third phase ===
A third phase took place during the 15th century. West of the castle a stud farm was built. A large three-roofed stable measured 30 * 12 m. There was a house for the stable master, and a watering place for horses, with a brick slope, on which they could enter the water. Next to that stood a round structure, probably a dovecote. This was probably also the time that the garden northeast of the outer-bailey was constructed.

=== Fourth phase ===
There were two main parts of the fourth phase. A chapel was added on the outer bailey in 1632. A gardeners house which also functioned as the local prison, also dated from the 17th century.

== History ==
=== Van Overbordene ===
Sint-Maartensdijk Castle originates from the 13th century. Jan Dankertszoon van Overbordene had possessions in the Oudelandpolder. In 1311 his son Gheront bought the polder from Count Willem III of Holland.

Somewhat before 1341 a feud led to the death of several people. On one side were knight Pieter Gherontszoon, his family and others. The other side was headed by Wolfert III van Borselen, and involved his clan and allies. One of this incidents was that Knight Pieter Gherontszoon and his sons were assaulted near Scherpenisse while on their way to the court in Westkerke. Pieter's son and some others were then bound and clubbed to death in that position. The perpetrators then crossed over the Pluimpot with the bodies, and spent the night before Pieter van Overbordene's castle.

Some of the perpetrators were Floris van Borselen the younger, and his brother Doedijn van Borselen. In 1342 the Count of Holland imposed severe penalties for these crimes. The clubbing was judged an excessive crime. However, while Doedijn was also banished till further notice, this did not apply to Floris. Floris van Borselen the younger was a son of Raes van Borselen, brother of Wolfert III van Borselen.

=== Van Borselen ===
Floris I van Borselen of Sint-Maartensdijk rose to power in the early 1350s. This is no doubt related to the Van Borselen clan choosing the side of Count William V of Holland against his mother Margaret II, Countess of Hainaut. In 1350 the first phase of the Hook and Cod wars started, and in 1351 the Van Borselens revolted and joined William. It is very tempting to think that this Floris van Borselen was either the Floris van Veere or Floris the younger mentioned in the 1342 reconciliation, but this was not the case, see Floris I van Borselen. Our Floris was a younger son of Claes I van Borselen.

Floris became a councilor of the Count of Holland in 1351. In 1354 Floris van Borselen bought the lordship of Sint-Maartensdijk from Count William V of Holland. It measured 1,600 gemeten, or 628 hectares. In 1357 the inhabitants of Haastinge got freedom from toll in some areas.

Floris would become castellan of Heusden Castle, and Custodian of the seal of Holland. In 1358-1359 he held Heusden Castle for a long time against the county's regent Albert. On 25 January 1359 he was reconciled with the count, but had to give up his office as castellan of Heusden. In 1368 Floris did without legal offspring, meaning that Sint-Maartensdijk Castle reverted to the count of Zeeland.

On 19 November 1368 Frank van Borselen (d. 1386) bought Sint-Maartensdijk from the count. He was a younger brother of Floris. In 1374 he dedicated his possessions in Sint-Maartensdijk to the count, and received them back as a Hoge heerlijkheid and onversterfelijk leen. The former meant that Frank got the high justice in his fief, meaning that he could impose capital punishment. The latter meant that the fief would be inherited in its entirety by the oldest son, but could also be inherited by daughters and other relatives. Frank married Alienora van Zuilen and had Floris, Dirk and Machteld.

Floris van Borselen (d. 1422) became lord Sint-Maartensdijk in 1386. In 1408 he also became lord of Zuylen Castle. In the 1390-1394 struggle he sided with the count. After Jacqueline, Countess of Hainaut came to power in 1417, Floris became more influential in politics. In 1418 he became her lieutenant in Zeeland, and in 1419 and 1420 he was treasurer of Holland. Floris and his wife Oede van Bergen were buried in the church of Sint-Maartensdijk, where their heavily damaged tomb still stands.

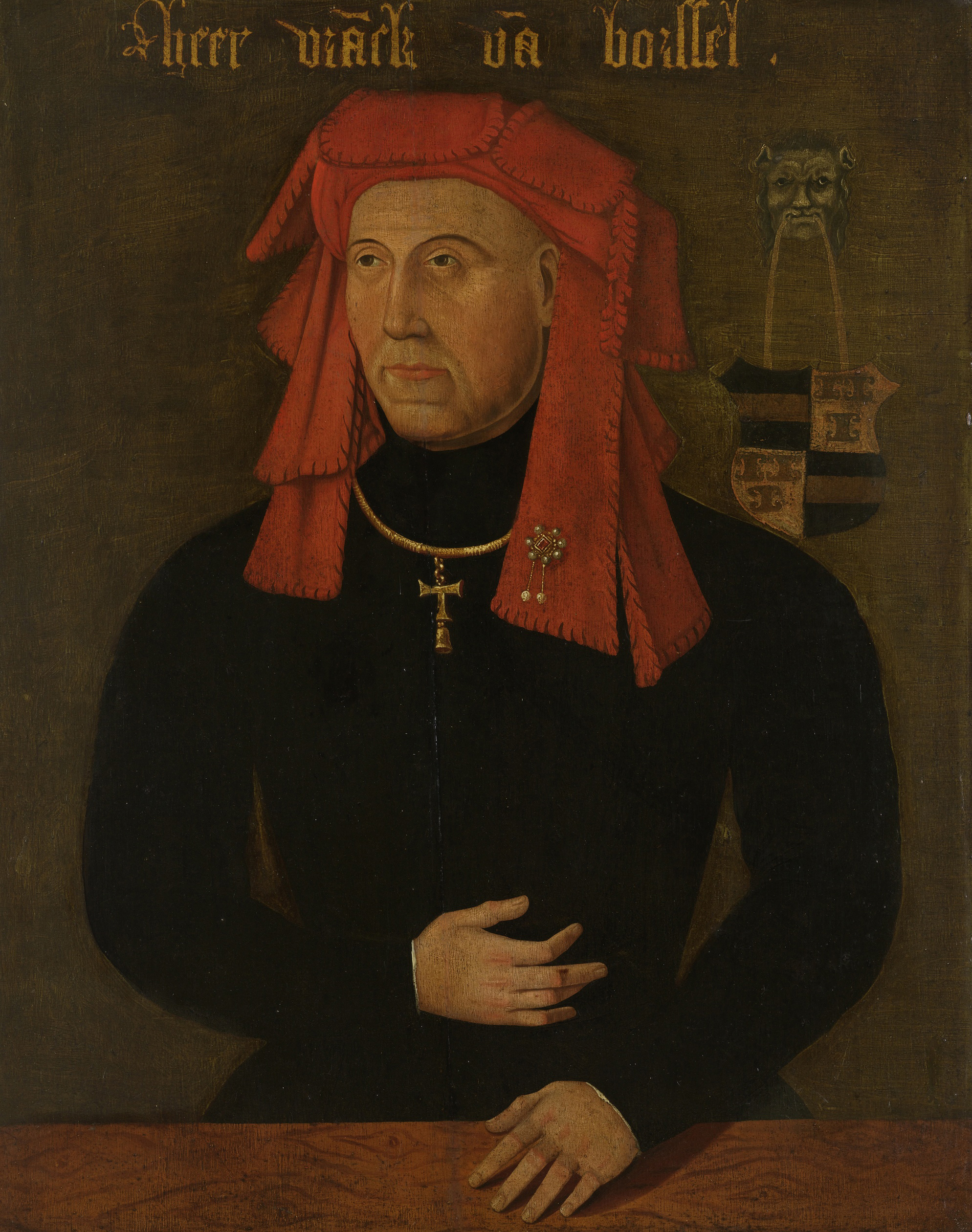
Frank II van Borselen

Frank van Borssele (c. 1396–1470) is the most famous of all the Van Borselen clan. After the Count of Holland died in 1417, Frank first sided with John III, Duke of Bavaria, who ruled Holland till 1425. After 1428 he reached the peak of his power during the first years of the reign of Philip the Good. After a conflict with Philip, he was reconciled, and married Jacqueline, Countess of Hainaut. They had no children, and Frank did not remarry.

The period that started with Frank van Borssele was not good for Sint-Maartensdijk. From about 1440 Frank resided mostly in Brielle, which generated about four times more income than Sint-Maartensdijk. Nevertheless, he probably ordered the construction of the stud farm.

In 1459 Frank transferred the Lordship of Kortgene to his bastard son Floris. Frank had bought Kortgene some years earlier. Frank had also bought the lordship of Borsselen. This he transferred to Jasper van Culemborg. Sint-Maartensdijk, Scherpenisse and his possessions in Utrecht and Brabant were inherited by his sister Alienora van Borselen.

Alienora van Borselen married Jan van Buren and Gerrit van Nijenrode. Her daughter Elizabeth van Buren married Gerrit van Culemborg, and got Aleid van Culemborg and Jasper van Culemborg. However, Alienora survived long enough to transfer her possessions to Floris van Egmond, son of Aleid and Frederik of Egmont.

=== Van Egmond ===
Floris van Egmont (1470–1539) was count of Buren and Leerdam, Lord of IJsselstein and councilor of Charles the Bold and Maximilian I. He married Margaret of Glymes-Bergen and had Maximiliaan van Egmond and Anna van Egmont the Elder (mother of Philip de Montmorency, Count of Horn).

Maximiliaan van Egmond (1509–1548) was also Count of Buren and Leerdam. He became Stadtholder of Friesland, Groningen, Overijssel and Drenthe in 1540. Maximiliaan married Françoise de Lannoy, and had one daughter Anna.

Anna van Egmont (1533–1558) next inherited Sint-Maartensdijk. She became the first wife of William the Silent (1544–1584). With William she had Philip William and Maria.

=== Van Oranje ===
Philip William, Prince of Orange (1554-1618) had been brought to Spain in 1568. He was of course the rightful heir to Sint-Maartensdijk and other possessions that his mother had brought to her marriage with William the Silent. His sister Countess Maria of Nassau (1556–1616) was in the Dutch Republic, and defended his rights. After Philips William returned to the Netherlands in 1596, he could lay claim to his possessions. However, Sint-Maartensdijk was not that important for him and the other Oranges that followed. As both Philips William and Maria did not produce any children, their half brother Maurice came next.

Maurice, Prince of Orange (1567–1625) did not enjoy this inheritance for long. He was succeeded by his half brother Frederick Henry, Prince of Orange (1584–1647). Frederick Henry would build the chapel on the outer-bailey in 1632. The Oranges continues in possession of Sint-Maartensdijk Castle till 1795. The Batavian Republic then disappropriated the castle and lands. These were sold to the former land agent of the Oranges, Marinus de Jonge van Ellemeet.

== Demolishment ==
By 1695 the main castle was in serious decay. From 1710 onwards, the main castle was getting demolished. This is kind of logical, because the Oranges were almost never at Sint-Maartensdijk Castle, but the economic activity on the outer bailey continued till 1795.

In 1818 the affairs of the goods of the Oranges were finally settled, and it was decided to demolish the rest of the castle. The buildings of the outer-bailey had to be removed till 6 feet below ground level, so that plowing would not be hindered. All had to be finished before 1 May 1819. Only the gardeners house was left. It had a vaulted room and also served as prison. The large portrait collection of the former town hall of Sint-Maartensdijk probably originates from the castle.

In 1963, the 17th-century gardener's house was demolished, and a bungalow was constructed on the terrain. This led to the first archaeological excavations on the terrain from 1965 to 1968.
