= Wolfert II van Borselen =

- Lord of Veere and Zandenburg
- Arms of Wolfert II van Borsele
- Predecessor: Wolfert I van Borselen
- Successor: Wolfert III van Borselen
- Born: 1280 or 1281
- Died: 1317
- Mother: Sybille

Wolfert II van Borselen (c. 1280 – 1317) was Lord of Veere and Zandenburg.

== Family ==
Wolfert II van Borselen was a member of a large clan. He probably became an adult at about the same time that his father Wolfert I was killed on 1 August 1299. At that time three groups of Van Borselens can be discerned:

The Van Borselen's of the main branch:

- Floris van Borselen, lord of Borselen, Goes and Cloetinghe, later of Hulst (d. 1322), and his children:
- Jan, mentioned 1290–1299
- Pieter, mentioned 1299–1315
- Elizabeth mentioned 1325
- Hadewych mentioned 1325

From the previous generation, he left his second wife Catharina of Durbuy (d. 1328) as widow. His surviving brothers were:

- Friar Hendrik Wisse van Borselen
- Raas van Borselen, bastard brother
- Jan Mulart van Borselen, bastard brother

Wolfert II and his siblings. These all descended from his father's first marriage with Sibilie.

- Wolfert's sister Heylewijf married to Gerard van Voorne in 1297
- Hendrik Wisse van Borselen, knight in 1303
- Floris van Borselen a.k.a. Floris der Vere
- Vranck van Borselen
- Clays van Borselen, founder of the Van Brigdamme branch
- Cibilie, married to Jan van Culemborg.

== Life ==
=== Late 1299: after the assassination of Wolfert's father ===
Wolfert II was first mentioned in 1303. This is a bit strange, because his father Wolfert had been killed in Delft on 1 August 1299. Indeed, Wolfert's younger brothers can be traced back earlier. Right after the assassination of Wolfert I, a number of his allies were imprisoned in Holland. John II, Count of Holland (1247–1304), regent for John I, Count of Holland (1284- 10 November 1299), was then said to have made a reconciliation between the Van Borselen's and the killers.

The Van Borselen's and their allies were then allowed to leave their prison under guarantee from their allies that they would soon be delivered back. On 26 September 1299 knights Raas van Borselen and Floris van Borselen and others bailed for Wolfert I's children Frank and Claas. That same day they bailed for Jan Mulart van Borselen, and Floris's son Pieter. On 11 October 1299 Frank and Clays van Borselen children of Wolfert, and Pieter son of Floris van Borselen, had to repeat these promises. At that moment, Frank and Claeys were in prison in Haarlem, and Pieter in The Hague. Also on 11 October Jan Mulart van Borselen gave the guarantee that he would return to his prison in Delft, and would deliver Frank and Claas children of his brother Wolfert, and Pieter son of Floris.

Obviously the brothers Wolfert II, Floris and Hendrik Wisse were not in Holland when their father was killed, and the same applied to their uncle Raas.

=== 1300: Vengeance in Veere ===
After Wolfert I's death John III, Lord of Renesse had come back to Schouwen. When he could not come to terms with John II, he left Schouwen and tried to ally with the Van Borselens. In the Spring of 1300 the count then sailed from Zierikzee in the direction of Arnemuiden with an army. Near Veere the army made an abortive landing. The count then sailed ahead and went to Middelburg. When his brother Guy of Avesnes heard this, he followed with the rear of the army. This was decidedly beaten by the Zeeland army, many were killed, and Guy and many others were taken prisoner.

Amongst the prisoners were some that where responsible for Wolfert I's death. Dirk van Zandhorst, Floris and Wouter van Duvenvoorde, and Gijsbrecht Bokel and Filips van Warmond were wheeled in Veere in the week before 3 May. It is not known what Wolfert II's role was in these events.

=== 1303 Flemish invasion ===
In 1303 Flanders conquered Walcheren and Veere with help of local allies. It led to the somewhat later Battle of Zierikzee. In 1303 Wolfert was mentioned in the last will of his brother Hendrik Wisse.

In 1308 Wolfert and his brothers were reconciled with William I, Count of Hainaut. In May 1309 there was a reconciliation about Wolfert I's death. Of the four brothers, Wolfert and Floris were mentioned as knights, Frank and Clays as squires. On the opposing side were: Philips van Duvenvoorde, Philips van Zanthorst, Wouter van Haerlem, Simon van Benthem, Philip Voerness, Vriesen van der Mye, etc. These had to pay 1,000 pounds to the Van Borselen's. On the other side, the Van Borselen's had to pay 3,000 pounds for the events at Veere.

=== Marriage ===
In about 1312 Wolfert II married Aleid (c. 1290 - 1351), a bastard daughter of John II, Count of Holland. There was papal dispensation because they were related in the fourth degree.

=== Last will ===
On 30 May 1316 Wolfert II made a contract about his father's estate with his brothers Sir Florence, Frank and Claas van Borselen. This also involved some of the dower of the Lady of Voorne, wife of Wolfert I. It is assumed that this contract was made because Wolfert II foresaw his death, because Wolfert II died shortly after. This happened before 6 April 1317, because on that day count William referred to his sister as widow of Wolfert van Borselen.

After Wolfert's death Aleyd remarried to Otto van Buren. In 1327 she was referred to as Lady of Zandenburg and of Buren.

== Offspring ==
Wolfert I and Aleid had only:

- Wolfert III van Borselen.
