= Wolfert I van Borselen =

Lord of Zandenburg and regent for John I, Count of Holland

- Lord of Zandenburg
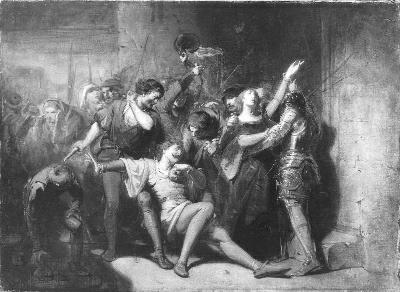
- Wolfert van Borselen lynched in Delft, by Johannes Egenberger
- Predecessor: Hendrik Wisse van Borselen
- Successor: Wolfert II van Borselen
- Born: c. 1250
- Died: 1 August 1299; Delft
- Mother: Clarissa van Gavere

Wolfert I van Borselen (c. 1245 – 1299) was Lord of Veere, Zandenburg and Polsbroek and regent for John I, Count of Holland.

== Family ==
Wolfert I van Borselen was born in about 1250 to Dominus Henricus de Bersalia dictus Wisse, miles and (according to some) Maria van Egmond.

Wolfert and his older brother Nicolaas were first mentioned on 6 November 1271 as Nicholaum et Wlfardum filios domini Henrici Wissen militis, fratres On 1 May 1296, Wolfert and his bastard brothers Raas and Jan were mentioned. In 1303, his brother the Franciscan friar Hendrik Wisse van Borselen was mentioned.

== Life ==
=== Career at court ===
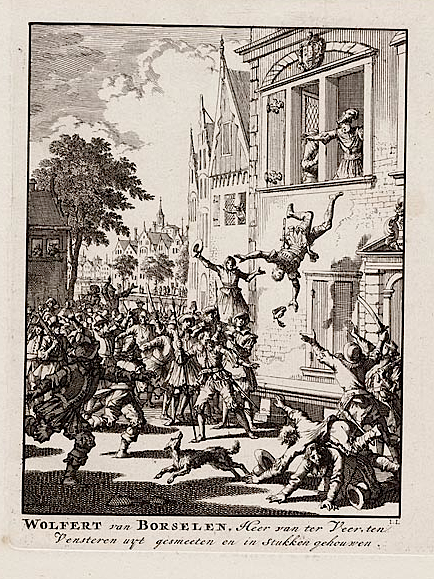
Wolfert defenestrated and lynched in Delft, by Jan Luyken.

In 1276, Wolfert was one of those who sealed a trade agreement between Floris V, Count of Holland and a number of cities in Overijssel and Gelderland. The highest-ranking van Borselen was Domini Petri de Borsalia, knight, probably from the main Van Borselen branch. Wolfert was mentioned simply as Wilfardi de Borsalia.

In June 1277, Wolfert, son of Hendrik Wisse of Borselen, concluded an alliance with Floris de Voogd, uncle and guardian of Count Floris V. Adelaide of Holland also sealed this alliance. In April 1280, Wolfert was with Floris V's army in the siege of Vredelant Castle. Here is ranked as 6th and last among those mentioned by name. The honorific heer before his name indicates that he was a knight by that time. In that same year, he received the Lordship of Veere from Floris V, Count of Holland.

=== Rise to power in Walcheren ===
The Van Borselen clan lived in the area between the Western Scheldt and the Eastern Scheldt. At the time, this area was called Zeeland Bewesterschelde. The feudal rights on Walcheren were therefore determined by the treaty of Hedensee, which had regulated the feudal rights in the area in 1167. By that treaty, the Count of Holland held the area as fief from the Count of Flanders. The income of the area was split, and there were mixed legal courts.

Wolfert I married Sibilie. In November 1282, Wolfert and his wife transferred their allodial lands near Zandijk and their castle Zandenburg to Beatrix of Holland, wife of Floris V. She then granted it back in fief inheritable by sons, daughters, and all other relations. Floris confirmed these acts. This act laid the foundations for the power of Wolfert's Van Borselen branch, because it could amass wealth over generations. Other fiefs in Zeeland could be inherited by sons only, and even had to be partitioned if there was more than one son.

By 1284, Wolfert was a knight, when he was mentioned in a charter that gave the traders of Dordrecht freedom of toll for their shipping. During this time, Wolfert still had a lot of influence at court. In 1290, Wolfert and many others in Zeeland Bewesterschelde rebelled for the first time, but they were already reconciled in October 1290.

=== Rebels against Holland ===
In November 1291, Wolfert and his oldest son paid homage to the Count of Flanders in exchange for 100 pounds a year. In 1293 and 1294, he was indeed paid by Flanders for his services. On 1 May 1296, the knights Wolfert van Borselen, Rase and Jan van Borselen brothers and Gielis van den Poelen were reconciled again with Count Floris V. Claims that he was involved in the assassination of Floris V on 27 June 1296 are unfounded.

=== All powerful in Holland and Zeeland ===
Now Wolfert's power reached its zenith. Floris V' son John I, Count of Holland (1284–1299) lived in England when he was assassinated. Already on 16 September 1296, King Edward of England asked Wolfert for help. In January 1297, Edward then promised that he would not make peace with France without France releasing Wolfert's sons, who were imprisoned there. It was a logical follow-up of the action which had cost Floris' life, i.e., to bring Holland in the English alliance.

On 1 April 1297, promised to follow Wolfert's council in everything. This allowed Wolfert to significantly extend his own possessions. He had Woerden, Beverwijk and Oudewater granted to him. However, this was not shown to have been illegal. Wolfert succeeded in saving Holland from the chaotic situation after the death of Floris V. Attacked from all sides, Wolfert succeeded in keeping its enemies at bay.

Meanwhile, Wolfert married a second time in 1297, to Catharina de Durbuy, daughter of Gerard of Luxemburg, Lord of Durbuy, and Mechteld van Kleef. Catharina was widow of Albrecht of Voorne, Lord of Voorne and burgrave of Zeeland. She was also the mother of Gerard van Voorne squire to Floris V.

=== Lynched in Delft ===
However, in time his power gave rise to jealousy. During a rebellion he was imprisoned and killed in Delft on 1 August 1299.

== Marriage and offspring ==
From the last will of Wolfert's son Hendrik Wisse, we know Wolfert's children as they were alive in 1303. A detailed list was given by Obreen. It was repeated by Regt in a more concise form.

- Wolfert II van Borselen (c. 1280–1317) Lord of Zandenburg, married Aleid of Avesnes, bastard daughter of John II, Count of Holland. He was not designated as a knight in the last will of Hendrik Wisse, so he might have been younger than him. Wolfert II was a knight in 1308.
- Heilwig van Borselen (died c. 1329), married Gerard van Voorne, son of Catharina de Durbuy.
- Sir Hendrik Wisse van Borselen knight, who made his last will in 1303. From the Dutch naming conventions, we can assume that he was the oldest son, because he was named after his grandfather. Another reason is that he was already a knight in 1303.
- Floris, deceased 21 June 1344 and buried in Middelburg. He was a knight in 1308. Usually designated as Floris of Veere.
- Frank (d. 1316) Squire in 1308.
- Claes I van Borselen (d. 1357), Squire in 1308. Lord of Brigdamme, buried in Middelburg.
- Cibilie, was married to Jan van Culemborg in 1328
