= Henry II van Borselen =

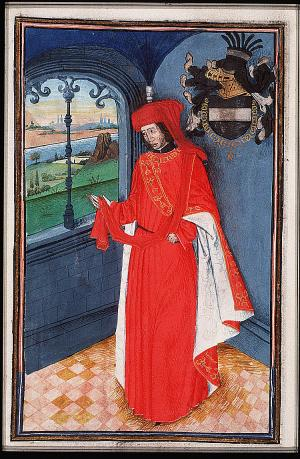
Henry II van Borselen as a Knight in the Order of the Golden Fleece.

Henry II van Borselen (ca. 1404 - Zandenburg Castle, 15 March 1474), Lord of Veere, Zandenburg, Vlissingen, Westkapelle, Domburg, Brouwershaven, Count of Grandpré was a Dutch nobleman and admiral of the 15th century.

== Biography ==
He was the eldest son of Wolfert V van Borselen (c. 1385-1409) and Hadewich van Borselen.
When his father died, he succeeded him as Lord of Veere, but as he was only 5 years old, under the guardianship of his uncle Floris van Borselen until 1423.

After the Treaty of Delft in 1428, he became a member of the Council of 9 Nobles.
From 1433, Philip the Good, Duke of Burgundy was officially Count of Holland and Zeeland, but he had to reckon with the power of his vassal Henry II van Borselen. The latter possessed his own merchant fleet and waged privateering wars independently, and held a powerful position on Walcheren.

In 1436, Henry II supplied three ships to Philip the Good to contribute to the Siege of Calais. During the Dutch–Hanseatic War, he sailed up the Elbe and the Weser in 1441 and towed away a number of Hanseatic cogs near Hamburg and Bremen.

His prestige extended far beyond Zeeland. In 1444, he managed to arrange a marriage for his son Wolfert VI van Borselen to Princess Mary Stewart, Countess of Buchan, daughter of King James I of Scotland. His daughter Margaret married Louis of Gruuthuse, one of the most powerful men in Bruges.

In 1445, Henry II van Borselen was knighted in the Order of the Golden Fleece.
In 1446, during a short period of heightened tension with Philip the Good, he stayed at the French court, where Charles VII of France appointed him as Lieutenant General on the conduct of the war at sea.

In 1453, he obtained Vlissingen, Westkapelle, and Domburg as collateral in connection with a loan to Count Philip the Good, and thereby also became Lord of these places. In 1467, he bought the county of Grandpré in the French Ardennes.

In 1470, Richard Neville, Earl of Warwick and his fleet captured several Dutch merchant ships. In response, Charles the Bold, Duke of Burgundy and Count of Zeeland, assembled a fleet of 23 ships. He appointed Henry II van Borselen chief of this fleet due to his extensive experience, thus even outranking the Admiral of Flanders, Joost de Lalaing. He defeated Warwick's fleet off the coast of Normandy, capturing 10 ships.

As a token of gratitude, Henry van Borselen was appointed chamberlain by King Edward IV of England for services rendered, and Veere obtained new trading privileges with England. From Charles, he received the Lordship of Fallais in the Prince-Bishopric of Liège and purchased a part of Brouwershaven in 1472.

He died 2 years later.

== Marriage and children ==
On 26 December 1429, Henry II van Borselen married Johanna van Halewyn (died 1467), daughter of Olivier van Halewijn, Lord of Heemsrode, and Marguerite de la Clyte, at Zandenburg Castle. The couple had (at least) three children:

- Wolfert VI van Borselen (died 1487), married to Mary Stewart, Countess of Buchan, Marshal of France, Order of the Golden Fleece
- Margaretha (died 1510), married to Louis de Gruuthuse, 1st Earl of Winchester, Order of the Golden Fleece
- Anna; married to Gillis von Arnemuiden, attested in 1458
