= Lord of Veere =

The Lordship of Veere was a Feudal lordship centered around the city of Veere in Zeeland in the Netherlands, which existed from 1280 to 1555.

== Lordship ==
The Lordship was owned by the House van Borselen until 1485, and then by the House of Burgundy through the marriage of Philip of Burgundy-Beveren with Anna van Borselen. In 1555, together with Vlissingen, it was elevated to a marquisate by Emperor Charles V. The Marquisate of Veere existed from 1555 to 1795.

== Lords of Veere ==
Period	Name	Notes
House van Borselen
1280-1299	Wolfert I van Borselen (1245–1299)	Received the Lordship of Veere from Floris V, Count of Holland.
1299-1317	Wolfert II van Borselen (1280–1317)	His son.
1317-1331	Wolfert III van Borselen (1313–1351)	His son. First under regency of his uncle Floris van Borselen.
1331-1351	Wolfert III van Borselen (1313–1351)	Then in his own right.
1351-1356	Wolfert IV van Borselen	His son. No issue.
1356-1401	Henry I van Borselen (1336–1401)	His brother.
1402-1409	Wolfert V van Borselen (1385–1409)	His son.
1409-1423	Henry II van Borselen (1404–1474)	His son. First under regency of his uncle Floris van Borselen.
1423-1474	Henry II van Borselen (1404–1474)	Then in his own right.
1474-1485	Wolfert VI van Borselen (1430–1486)	His son.
1485-1486	Occupation by Maximilian I of Austria	For participating in the First Flemish Revolt
House of Burgundy
1486-1498	Philip of Burgundy-Beveren (1450–1498)	Married heiress Anna van Borselen in 1486
1498-1505	Anna van Borselen (1472–1518)	Ruled as a widow and with her second husband Louis of Montfoort
1505-1540	Adolf of Burgundy (1489–1540)	Son of Anna van Borselen and Philip of Burgundy
1540-1555	Maximilian of Burgundy (1514–1558)	In 1555, Emperor Charles V promoted the Lordship to Marquisate of Veere.
