= Sint Laurens =

- Village
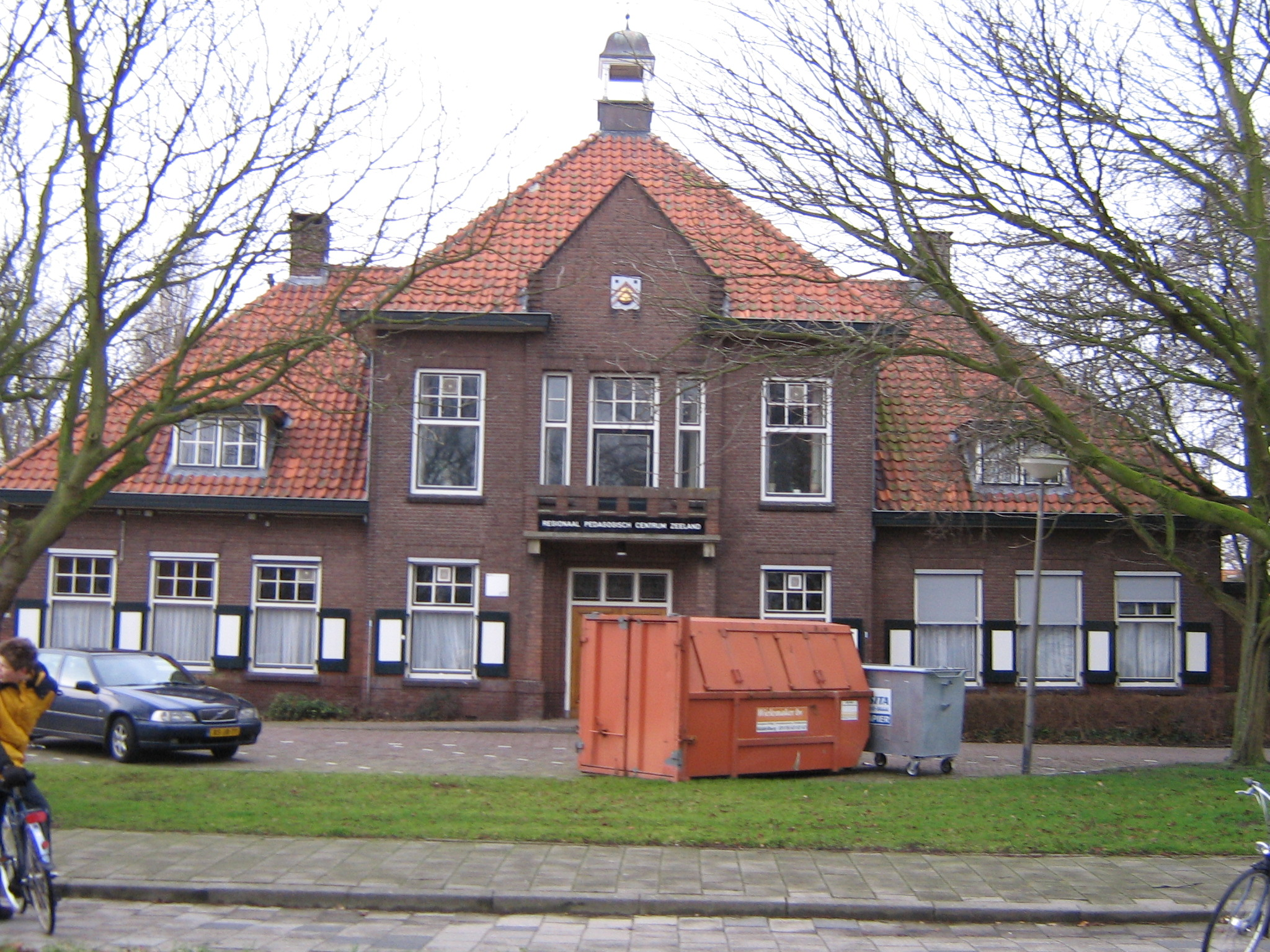
- Former town hall

- Flag Coat of arms

- Location in the province of Zeeland in the Netherlands Sint Laurens (Netherlands)
- Coordinates: 51°32′N 3°36′E
- Country: Netherlands
- Province: Zeeland
- Municipality: Middelburg

Area
  - Total: 1.67 km^{2} (0.64 sq mi)
- Elevation: 0.0 m (0 ft)

Population (2021)
  - Total: 960
  - Density: 570/km^{2} (1,500/sq mi)
- Time zone: UTC+1 (CET)
  - Summer (DST): UTC+2 (CEST)
- Postal code: 4333
- Dialing code: 0118

Sint Laurens is a village in the Dutch province of Zeeland. It is located in the municipality of Middelburg, about 3 km north of the city.

== History ==
The village was first mentioned in the 13th century as "ecclesia sancti Laurentii alias Popkinsburgh". It was first named Popkensburg. The current name refers to Saint Lawrence. Sint Laurens is a road village which developed near the Popkensburg Castle. The castle was demolished in 1863. The linear settlement expanded up to Brigdamme.

The Dutch Reformed church is an aisleless church was built in 1644 to replace the church of the castle. It was restored in 1952.

In 1816, the village of Brigdamme was merged into Sint Laurens. Sint Laurens was home to 203 people in 1840. Sint Laurens remained a separate municipality until 1966, when it was merged with Middelburg.

== Gallery ==
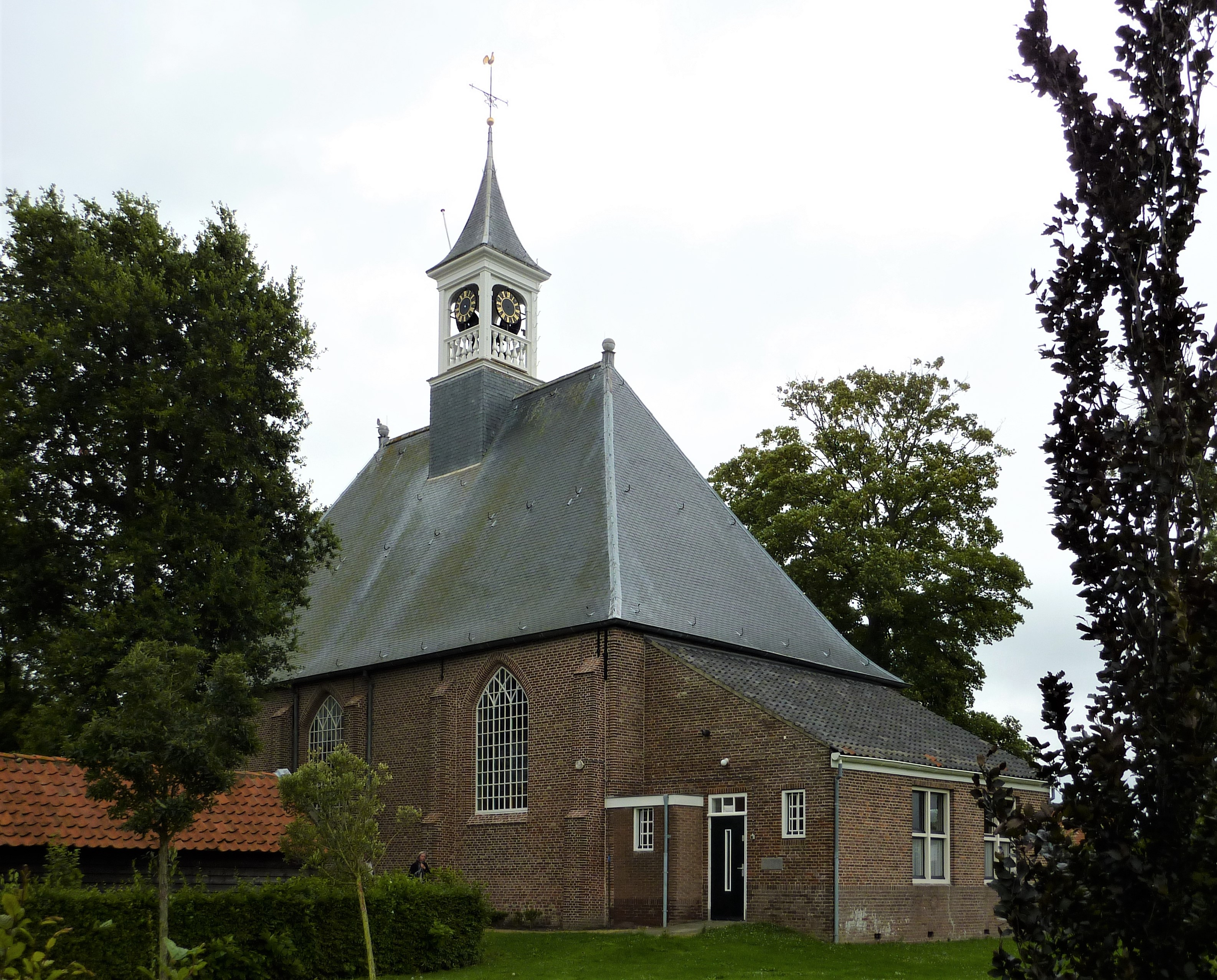
Church of Sint Laurens

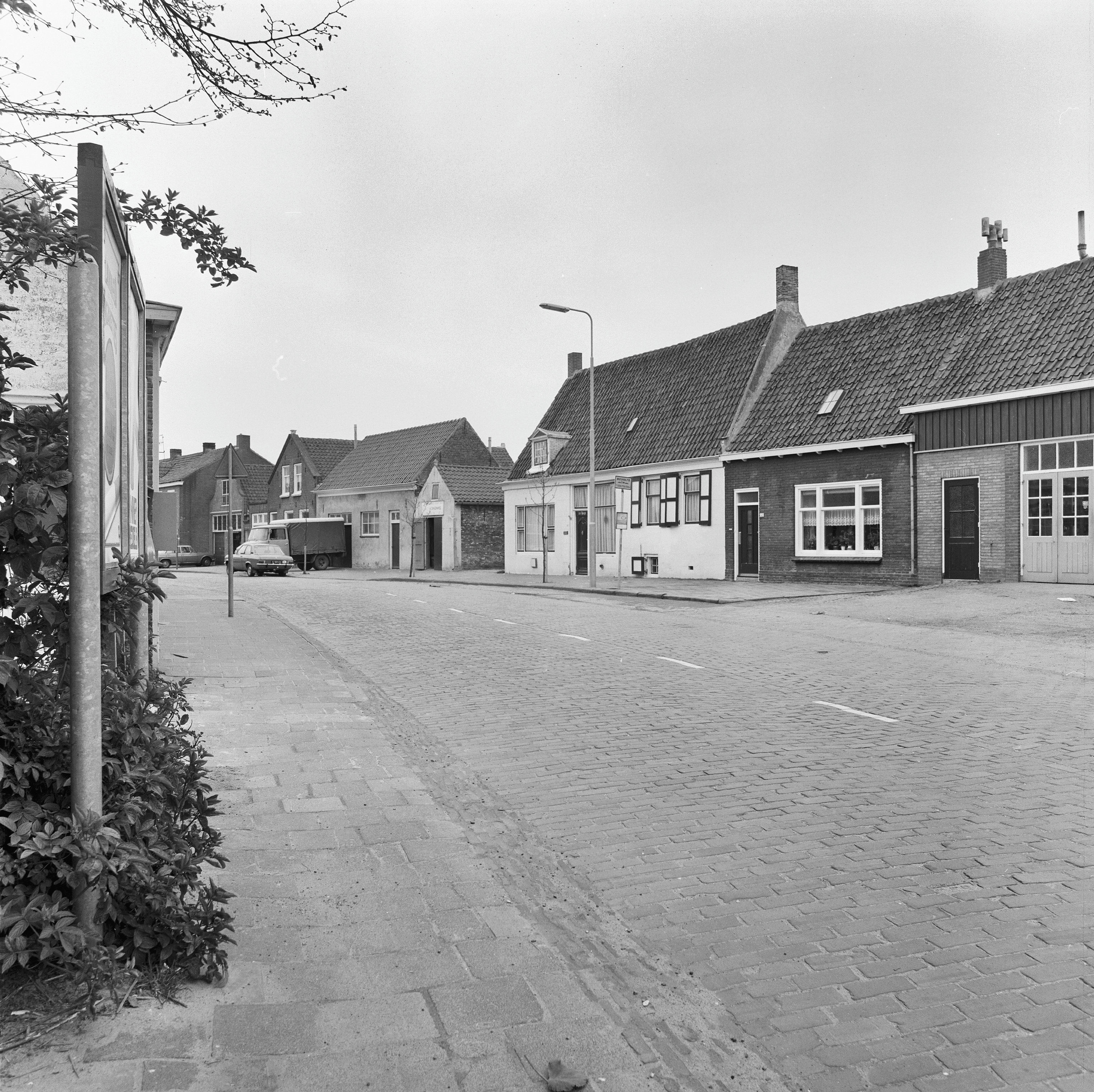
Street view (1975)

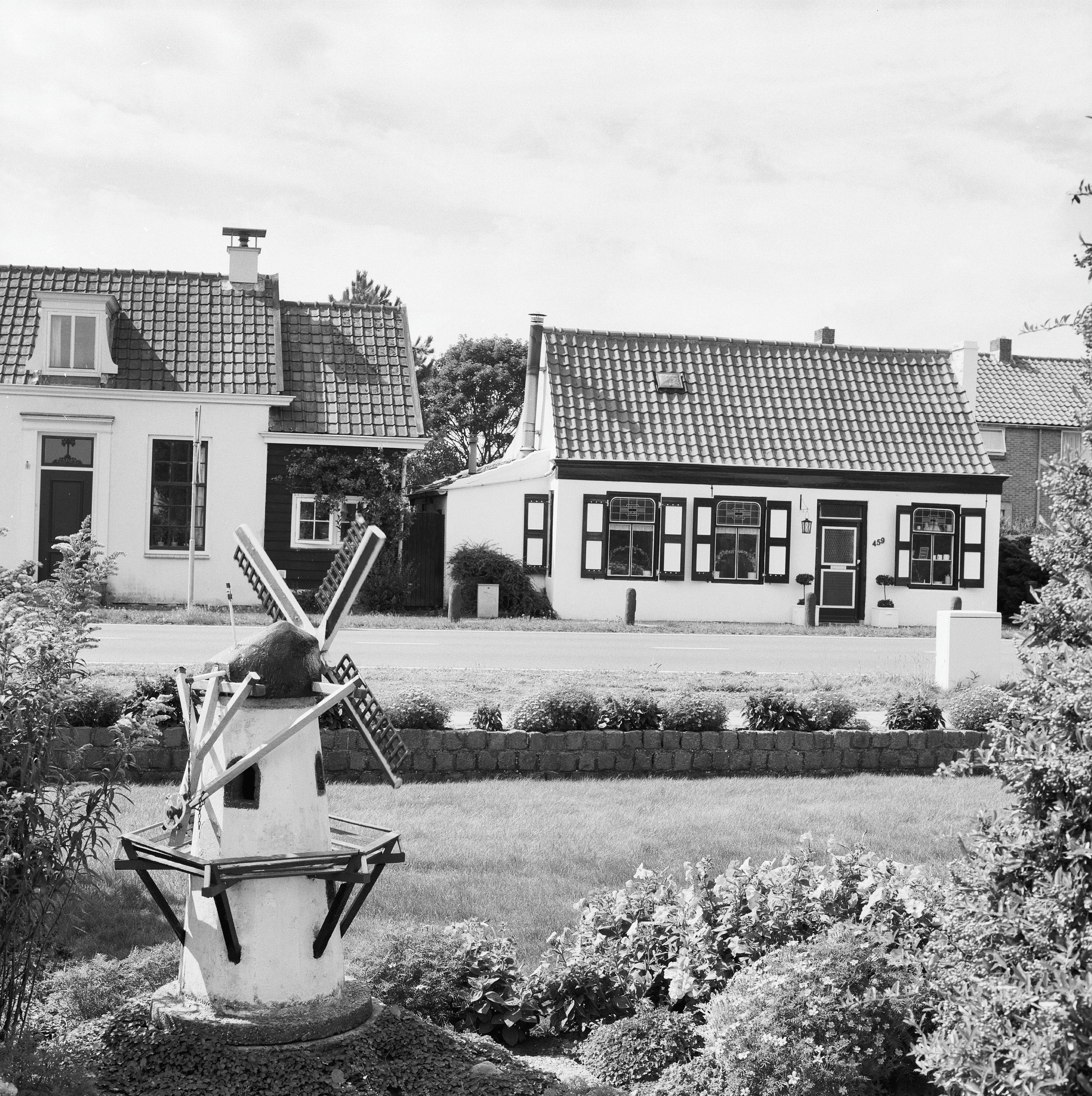
Former millers house
