= Brigdamme =

- Coat of arms
- Interactive map of Brigdamme
- Coordinates: 51°30′58″N 3°36′19″E
- Country: Netherlands
- Province: Zeeland
- Municipality: Middelburg

Population (2007)
  - Total: 580

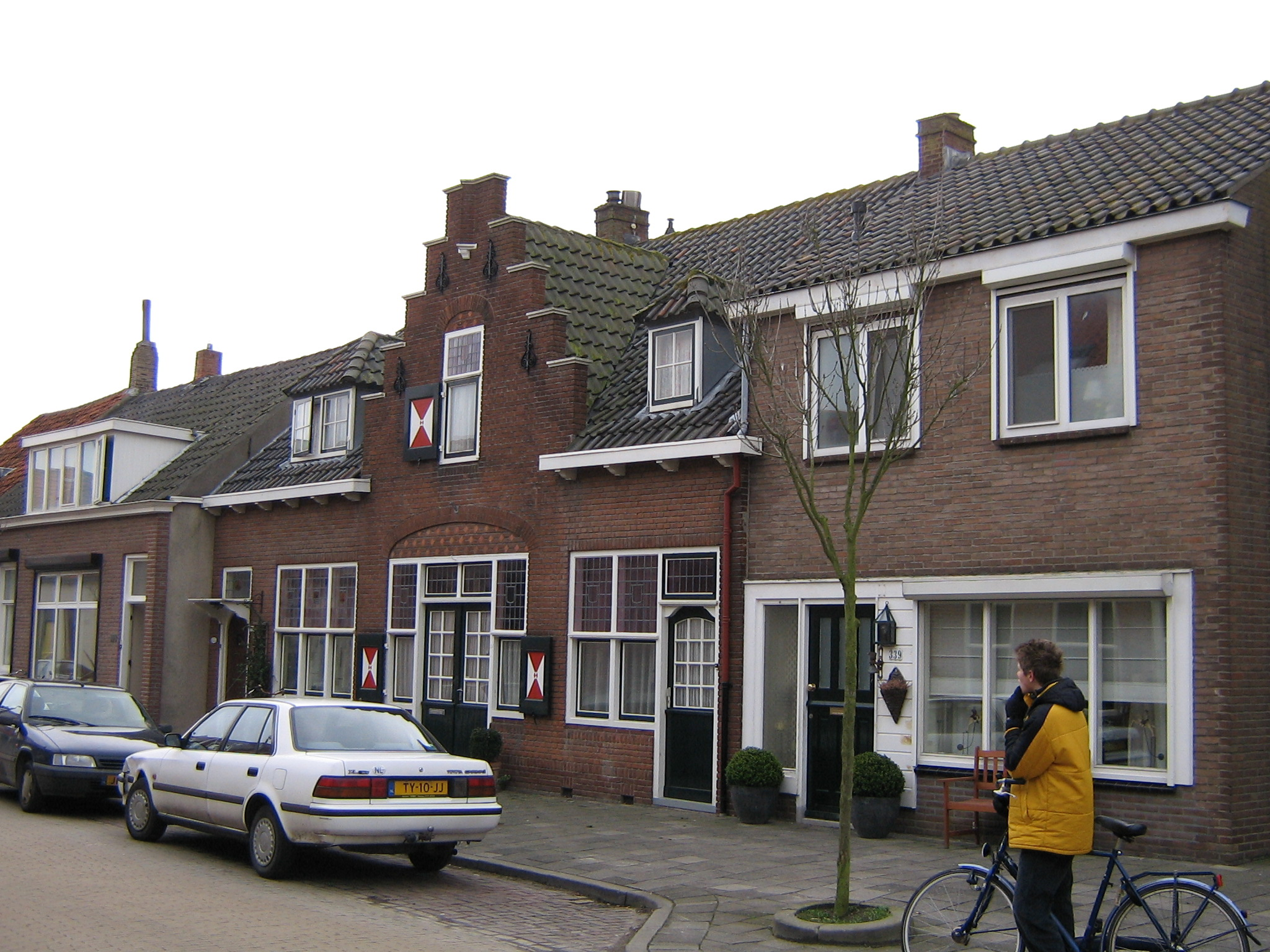
A house in Brigdamme

Brigdamme is a former hamlet and municipality in the Dutch province of Zeeland. It was a separate municipality until it merged into Sint Laurens in 1816. The hamlet was located south of the village of Sint Laurens, on the road to Middelburg.

The hamlet is no longer named on the newest topographical map of the area,.

According to the 19th-century historian A.J. van der Aa, there was an ancient chapel in Brigdamme, dedicated to Saint Brigitta. It was replaced around 1245 by a large church, which was later demolished.
