= Wolfert III van Borselen =

Lord of Veere and Zandenburg

- Lord of Veere and Zandenburg
- Arms of Wolfert III van Borselen
- Predecessor: Wolfert II van Borselen
- Successor: Wolfert IV van Borselen
- Died: 1351
- Mother: Aleid

Wolfert III van Borselen was Lord of Veere and Zandenburg.

== Family ==
The Van Borselen family originated from Borsele, a village on the former island of Zuid-Beveland. In the first half of the thirteenth century, a branch of this family settled on Walcheren. It soon founded the small city of Veere.

In 1312 Wolfert III's father Wolfert II van Borselen married Aleid, natural daughter of John II, Count of Holland (1247-1304). They had only a son Wolfert III. Others say they also had a daughter Cibilie, or perhaps Kateline.

On 30 May 1316 Wolfert II made a contract about his grandfather's estate with his brothers Sir Florence, Frank and Claas van Borselen. This also involved some of the dower of the Lady of Voorne, wife of Wolfert I. It is assumed that this contract was made because Wolfert II foresaw his death, because Wolfert II died shortly after. This happened before 6 April 1317, because on that day count William referred to his sister widow of Wolfert van Borselen, and her daughter 'Kateline'.

Wolfert III's mother Aleyd then remarried Otto van Buren. In 1327 she was mentioned as Lady of Zandenburg and of Buren. By 1351 she was again a widow.

== Life ==
=== Early life ===
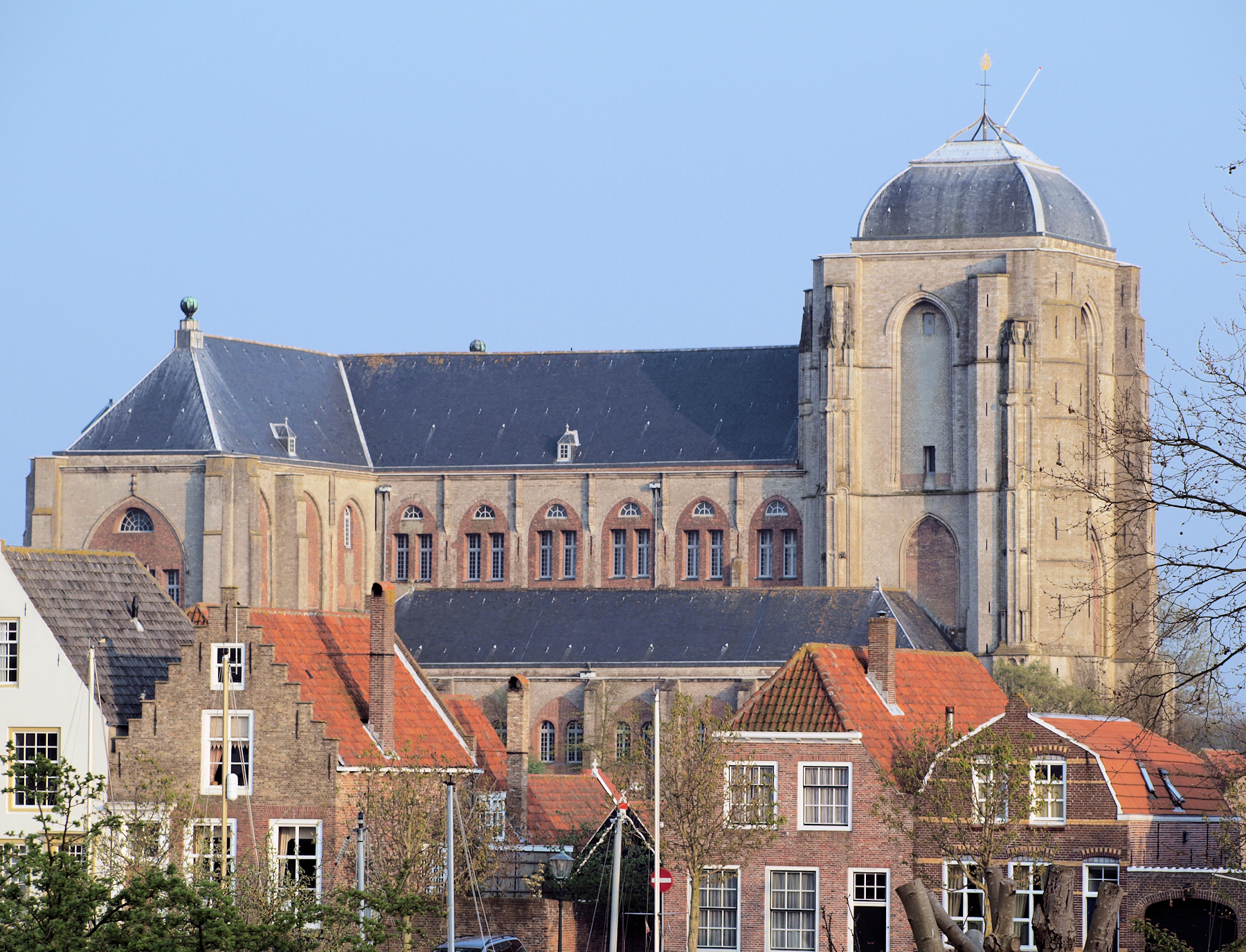
The Grote Kerk of Veere was founded in 1342

In 1325 the young Wolfert III was mentioned as the count's nephew. This is explained by the family relation. In 1327 an elaborate charter about laws in Zeeland west of the Scheldt had Knight Florence van Borselen, and Squire Claes van Borselen as signatories, but not Wolfert. In 1324 Florence was mentioned as Florence van der Veere, knight. In March 1325 he was mentioned as Florence of Borselen and Veere, when the sale of a house in Flanders was authorized by the Count of Holland on behalf of his nephew. On 22 May 1331 Florence and Klaas van Borselen were mentioned in a dispute about the dower over their deceased mother, the Lady of Voorne.

On 4 May 1331 a contract about a dike near Goes was made between two parties. One consisted of Florens van Borselen, Jan van der Mailstede and those of Goes (Goys). The other party consisted of: The Lady of Wissekerke, her son Wolfert, and those of Wissekerke.

In 1336 Wolfert III was a squire at the count's court.

=== At court ===
In 1337 Wolfert was a knight. In 1339 Wolfert III got some privileges for Veere. In April 1341 Wolfert van Borselen Lord of Veere and Zandenburg got toll freedom for the inhabitants of Veere. In 1344 and 1345 Wolfert III was still at the court of Willem IV of Holland. On 21 June 1345 he was mentioned as the Count's nephew: Sir Wolfert van Borselen, Lord of Veere.

=== Battle of Warns ===
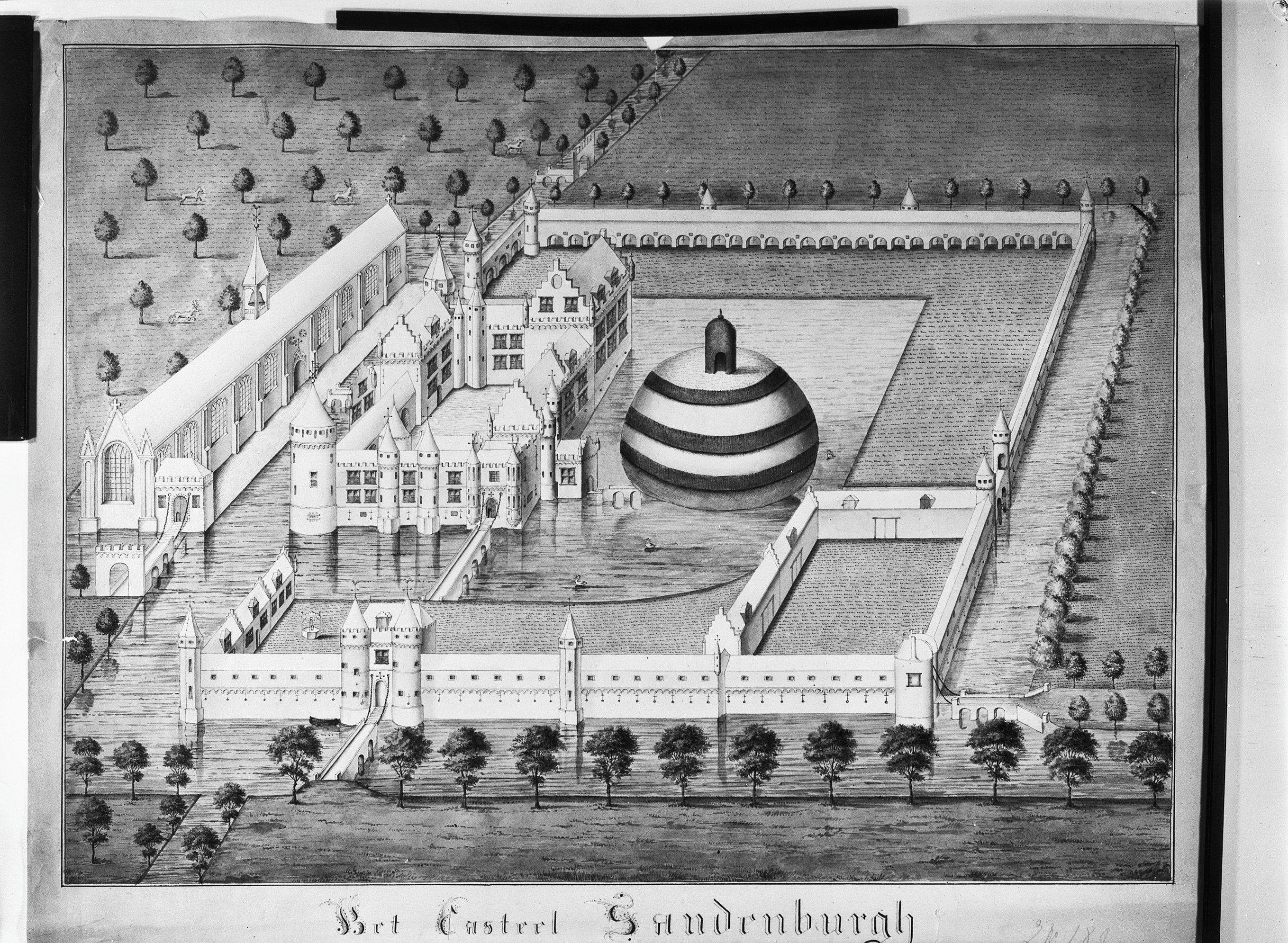
18th century impression of Wolfert's Zandenburg

It's good question whether Wolfert III was at the battle of Warns, and whether he died there. The early historian Reygersberg had that Wolfert II died in the 1345 Battle of Warns. As a consequence he had Wolfert III becoming lord of Veere in 1345.

The more recent historian Regt claims that Wolfert II died c. 1317, and that Wolfert III died in June 1351. The view that Wolfert II died c. 1317 is supported by sources that Van Mieris published about 200 years after Reygersberg. Wolfert III's death in 1351 is supported by a work rediscovered by Van den Bergh in the 1840s.

=== Later years ===
In September 1346 empress and countess Margaret II, Countess of Hainaut granted the fortress veste of Veere in fief to Wolfert van Borselen, Lord of Veere.

In 1346 Wolfert III founded a church in his polder Insula. It got him into trouble with the mighty abbot of Middelburg. In January and March 1348 he was mentioned as Margaret's nephew: Sir Wolfert van Borselen, Lord of Veere. On 14 January 1350 William of Holland and Zeeland confirmed Wolfert van Borselen, Lord of Veere in the possession of a long list of fiefs, including Veere and Zandenburg.

On 30 March 1350 Wolfert and his wife Hadewich transferred their estate Dunebeke to Count Willem and received it back as a fief.

=== The Hook and Cod wars ===
During the Hook and Cod wars Wolfert III first sided with Margaret and the Hook faction. On 18 January 1350 Wolfert and a lot others declared they would submit to the judgement of Margaret in the case of the deaths of Wolfert The Bastard of Borselen, the Lord of Moermond and all that followed. On the opposing side, Jan and Floris van Haamstede did the same. On 6 February 1350 Margaret judged that Wolfert's party should pay 12,000 pounds, while Haamstede's party should pay 2,000 pounds.

On 18 January 1351 Wolfert had also solemnly pledged his fealty to Margaret. Not much later in 1351 Wolfert switched to the Cod side. The rather extraordinary net sum of 10,000 pounds that Wolfert and his allies had to pay for past troubles might have played its part in this decision. Wolfert lost the subsequent May 1351 Battle of Veere, because some lords deserted him. Wolfert then went to Middelburg, and died from sickness soon after. There are no indications that the defeat had any serious consequences for the Borselen's.

== Offspring ==
Wolfert (III) was married to Hadewich Both van der Eem (c. 1320 - before 1371), and had four children.

- Wolfert IV van Borselen, Lord of Veere and Zandenburg from 1351 to 1356. Died after 25 August 1356.
- Hendrik I van Borselen (c. 1336 - 1401), squire (1354), knight (1362), counselor of the regent (1361, 1375, 1377 and 1379), Lord of Veere and Zandenburg (after his brother Wolfert).
- Aelbrecht van Borselen, died before 1356.
- Aleid van Borselen, born before 1343, died after 26 August 1414.
