= Sint-Maartensdijk =

Village in Zeeland, Netherlands

- Village
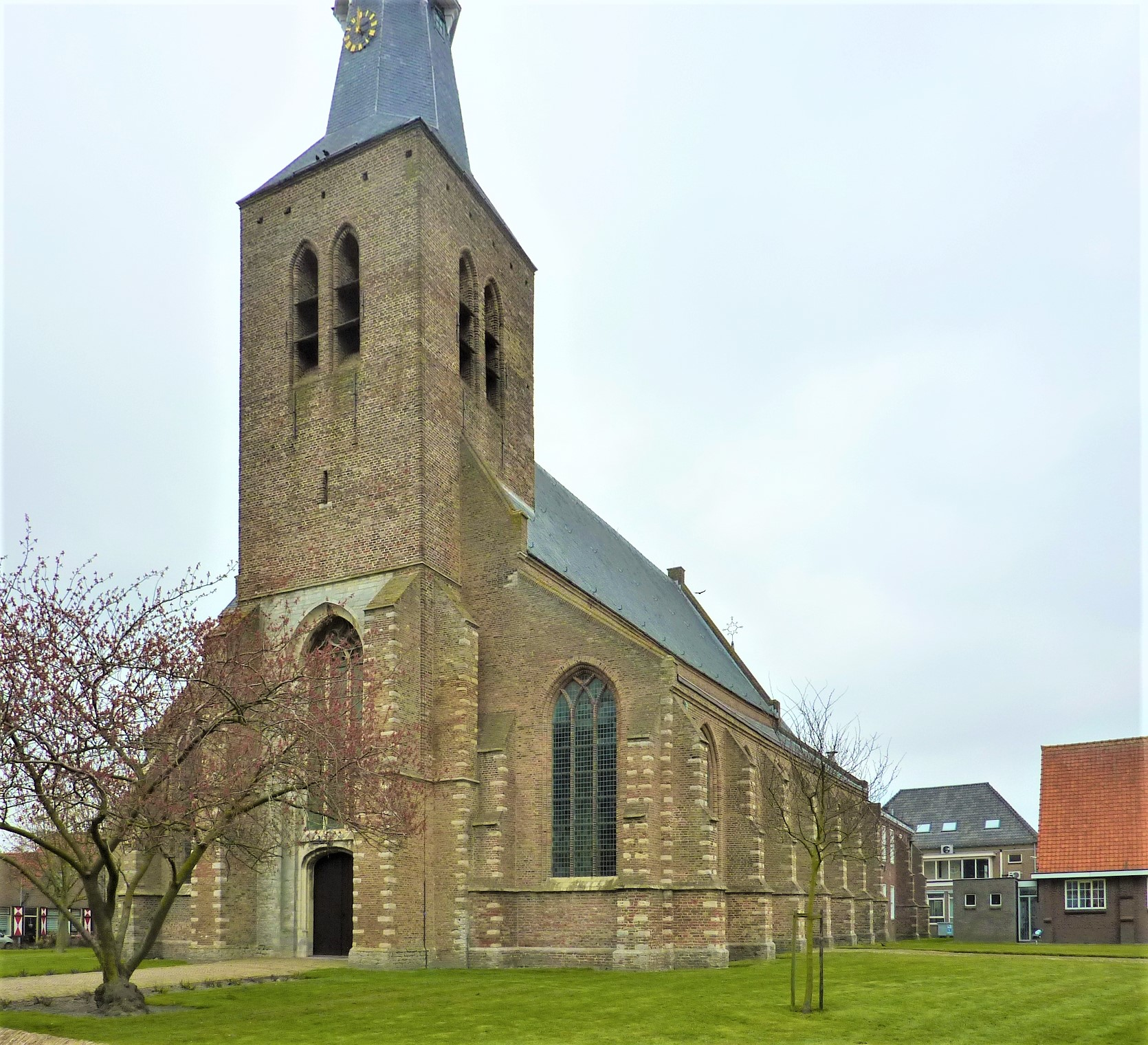
- Dutch Reformed church

- Flag Coat of arms

- Location in the province of Zeeland in the Netherlands Sint-Maartensdijk (Netherlands)
- Coordinates: 51°32′52″N 4°4′30″E
- Country: Netherlands
- Province: Zeeland
- Municipality: Tholen

Area
  - Total: 22.26 km^{2} (8.59 sq mi)
- Elevation: 1.0 m (3.3 ft)

Population (2021)
  - Total: 3,440
  - Density: 155/km^{2} (400/sq mi)
- Time zone: UTC+1 (CET)
  - Summer (DST): UTC+2 (CEST)
- Postal code: 4695
- Dialing code: 0166

Sint-Maartensdijk (Dutch pronunciation: [sɪnt ˈmaːrtənzˌdɛik]) is a village in the Dutch province of Zeeland. It is a part of the municipality of Tholen, and lies about 16 km west of Bergen op Zoom.

== History ==
Named after Saint Martin, Sint-Maartensdijk was founded as 'Haestinge', and renamed when it got a church dedicated to Martin of Tours. The first lords of Sint-Maartensdijk resided at Sint-Maartensdijk Castle which was demolished in 1819. The castle was located just north of the town walls, and its southern moat is still visible.

Sint-Maartensdijk was a separate municipality until 1971, when it was merged with Tholen.

== Born in Sint-Maartensdijk ==
- Keetie van Oosten-Hage (born 1949), former cyclist
- Cornelius Vermuyden (1595–1677), engineer
- The Ghanaian politician Alfred Vanderpuije is descended from a Sint-Maartensdijk family

== Gallery ==
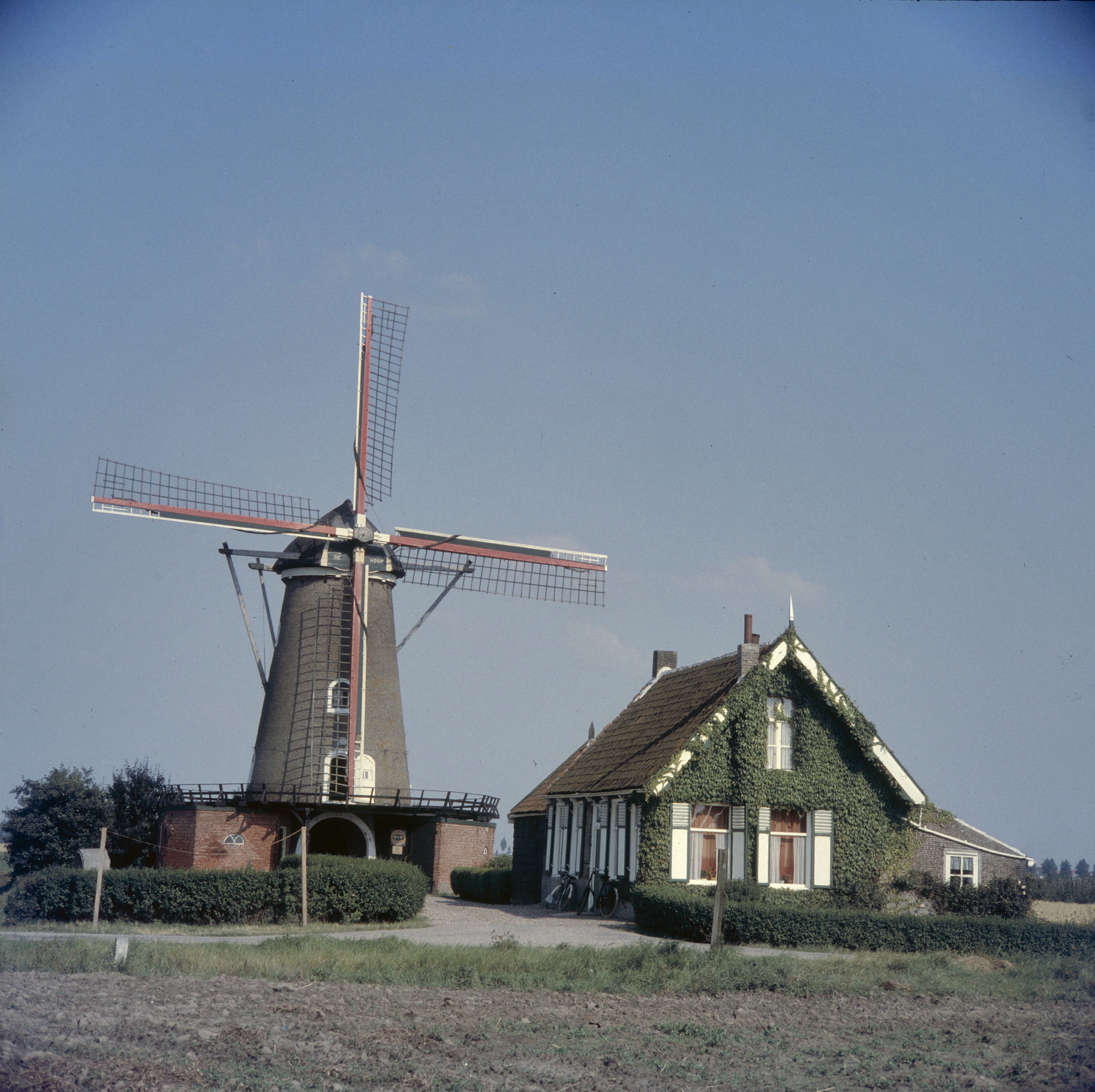
Wind mill and ivy covered house

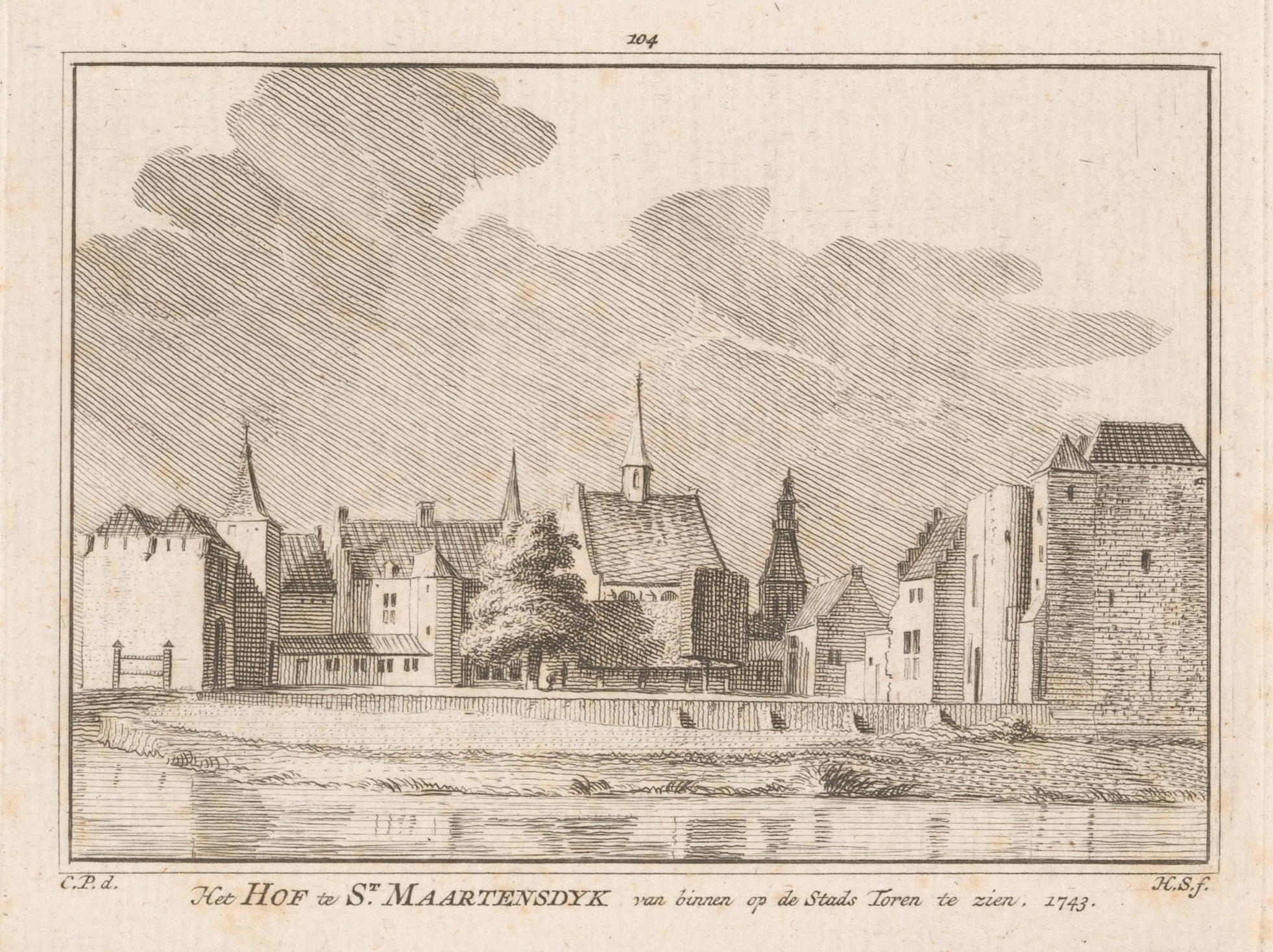
View on Sint-Maartendijk (1743)

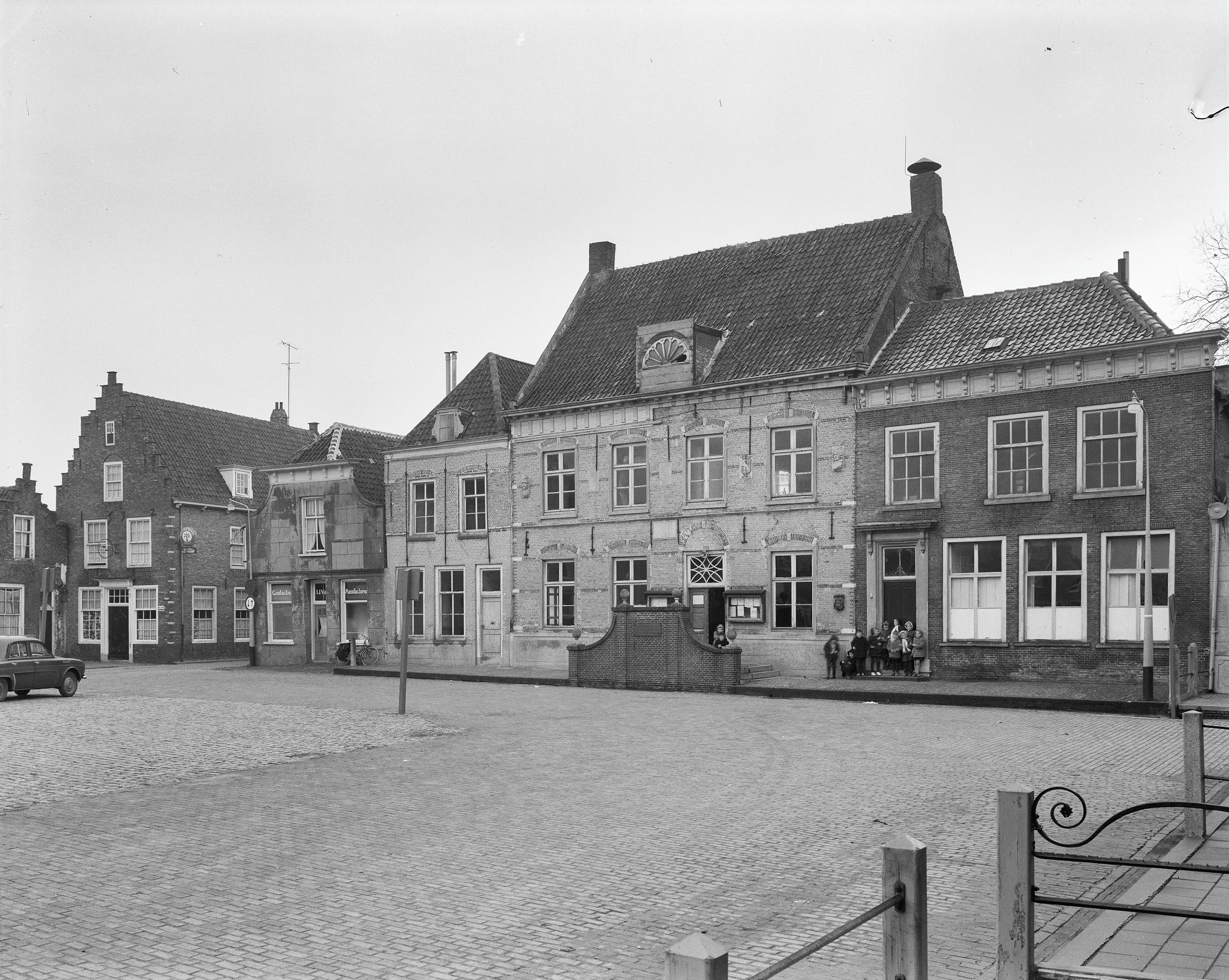
Town hall with neighbouring houses

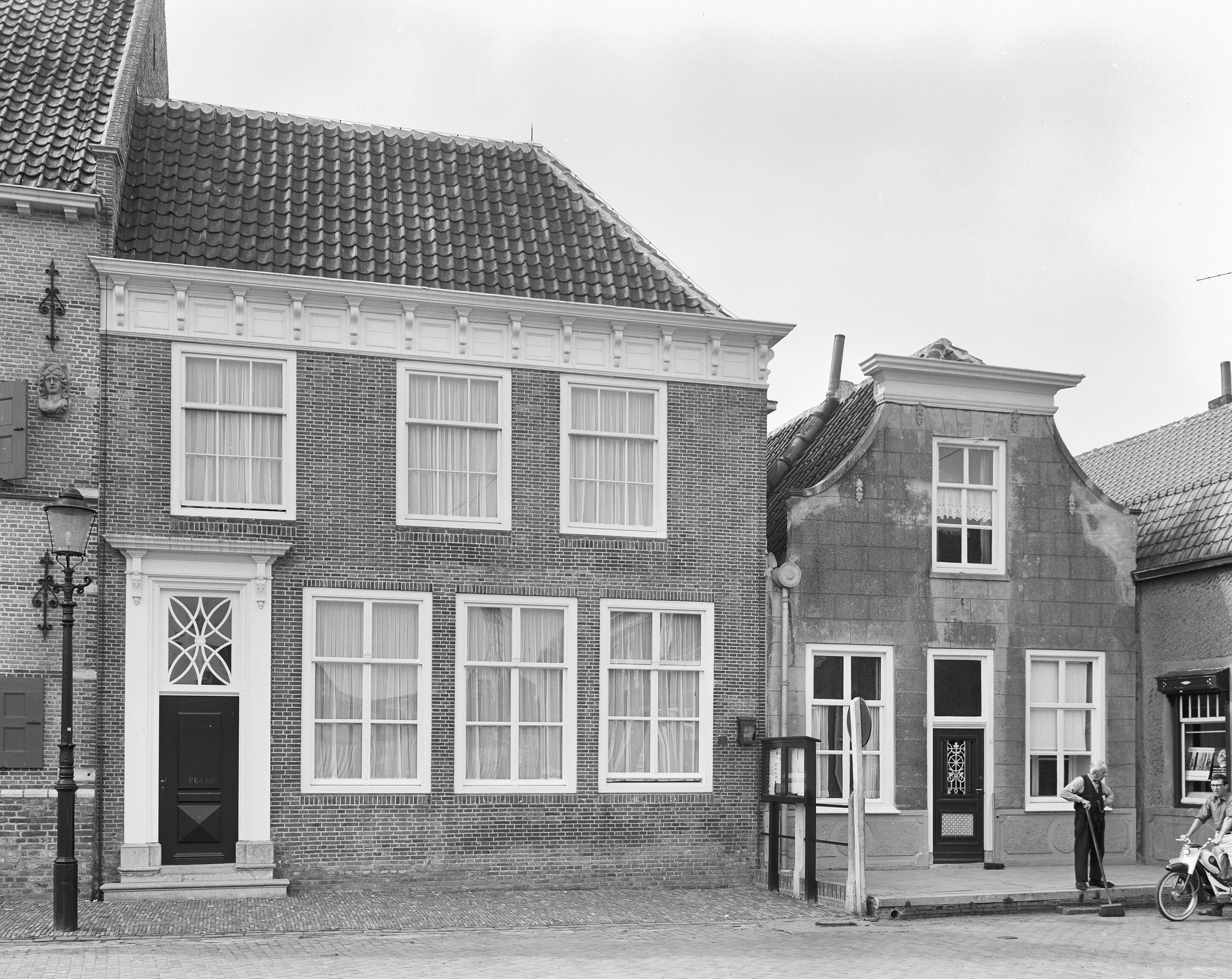
Houses in Sint-Maartensdijk
