= Ghent War (1449–1453) =

1449–1453 revolt by Ghent against Philip the Good over disputes on guilds and taxes

Ghent Revolt
- Part of the Revolts of Ghent
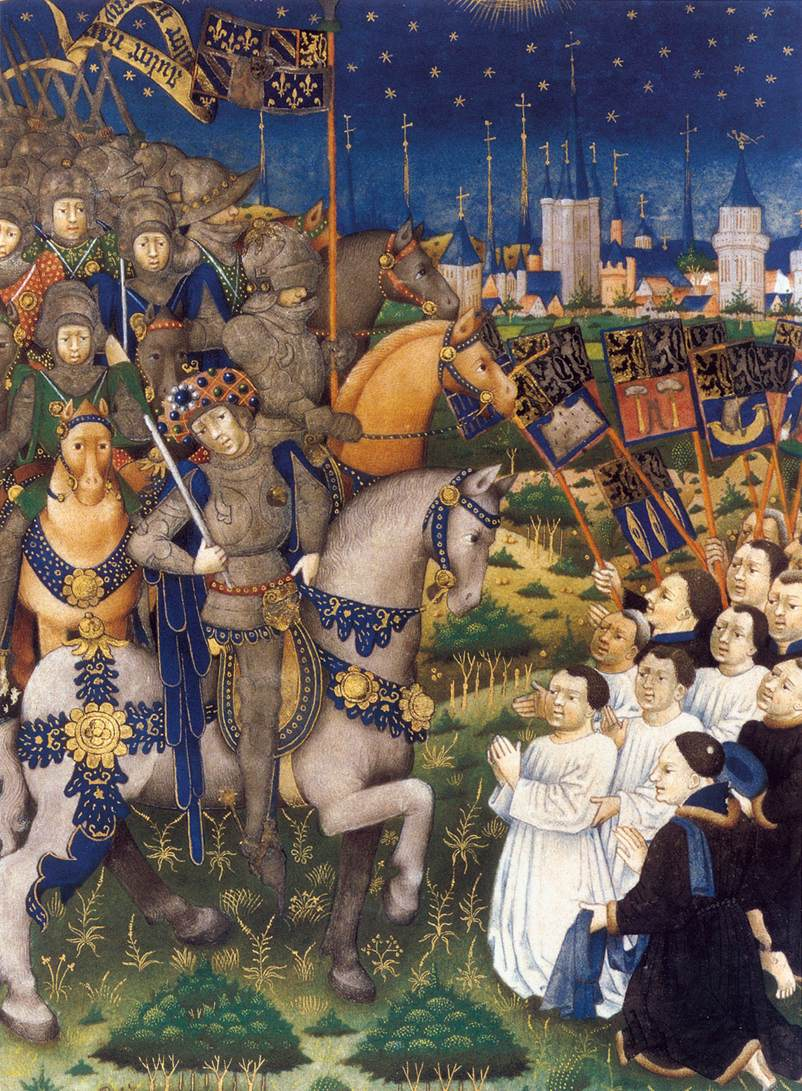
- The burghers of Ghent surrender to Philip the Good at the Battle of Gavere. Illustration from a contemporary manuscript.
Date	1449–1453
Location	County of Flanders, Burgundian Netherlands (modern-day Belgium)
Result	Burgundian victory

Belligerents
Burgundian State	Ghent rebels

Commanders and leaders
Philip the Good (WIA); Corneille of Burgundy †	

The Revolt of Ghent was a rebellion by the city of Ghent against the Burgundian State. It lasted from 1449 to 1453. The rebellion was eventually suppressed by the Burgundians.

== Background ==
After their efforts in the Battle of the Golden Spurs in 1302, the guilds demanded and received the so-called small "Nering", participation in the rule of the Flemish cities, which was a common result in the wars and battles involving the Low Countries. In Ghent, a relative equilibrium was achieved between 1360 and 1380, where the schepenen formed a coalition called the Great Council of Ghent. The council had three members; one was chosen by the poorters (a type of citizenship), one was chosen by the influential guild of weavers (Flanders had become rich because of its cloth production), and one was chosen by the smaller guilds. This trio was called the Rule of the Three Council Members.

From around 1430, Philip the Good strove for a return to the situation before the Guldensporenslag; the influence of the guilds, especially those with archdeacons (in the Low Countries, "deacon" was also used to denote the leaders of guilds), was in conflict with the Charter of Senlis (1301) according to Philip. The Ghent city government based its defense against Philip's claims on customs and old privileges from the 12th and 13th centuries, before the Charter of Senlis had been signed. To enforce his attempts at gaining control over the appointment of city officials, Philip the Good also searched for a reliable source of income. This he found in the rich Flemish cities, where he raised indirect taxes. Until then, he had been forced to rely on requests for individual taxes (called beden), which could be refused by the city government.

== Causes ==
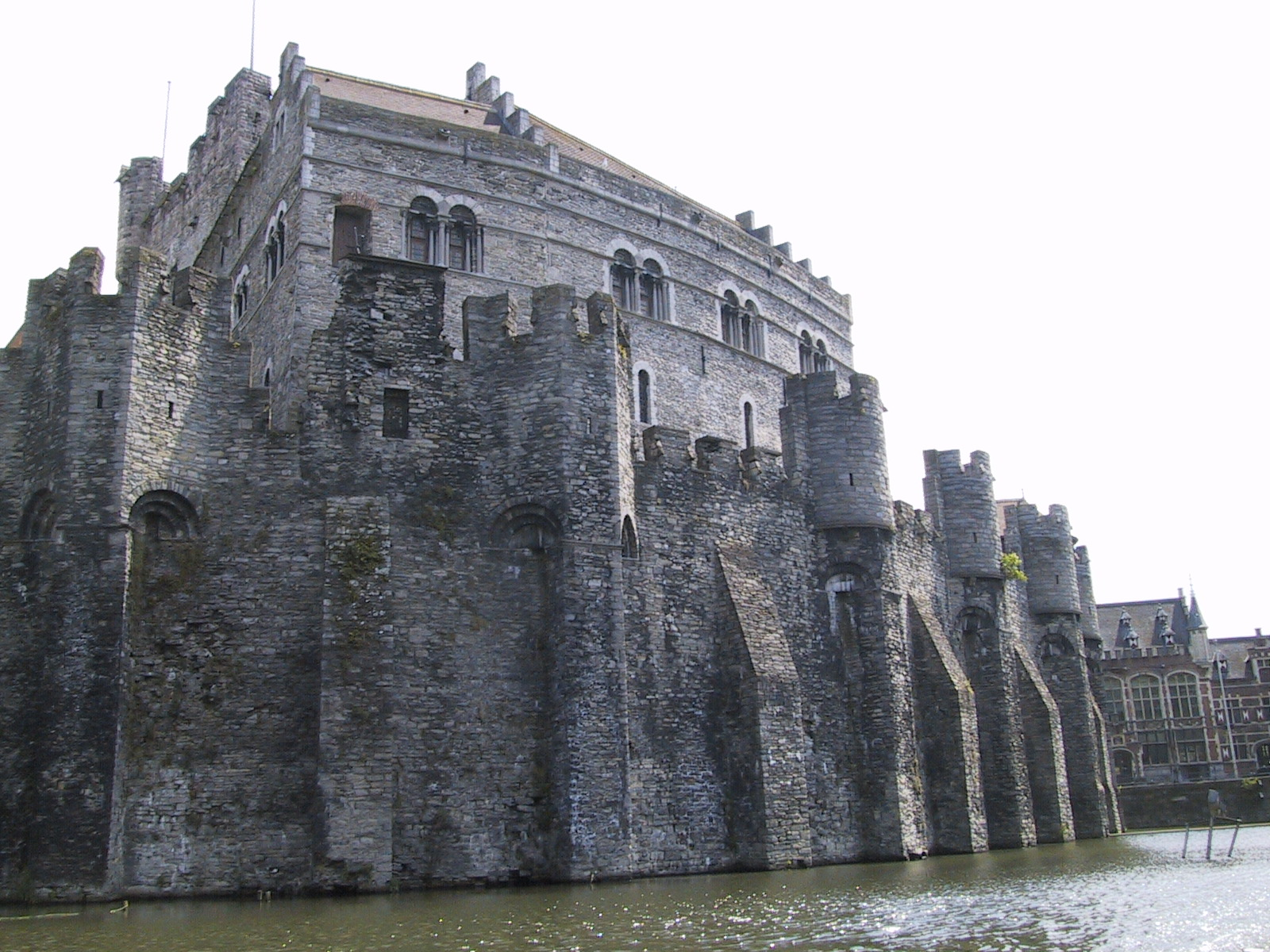
Gravensteen castle, Ghent

During his visit to Ghent in January 1447, Philip proposed a semi-permanent tax on salt, after the French example of the gabelle. Later, he proposed a similar tax on flour, which would be collected by ducal officials. Salt was then very important as it was the only way to preserve food for long periods of time. Philip had prepared a speech in Dutch, the main language of the Council, and the deacons of some of the guilds were consulted or bribed. The city government of Ghent refused to give in. After two years of negotiation, the taxes were rejected. Wanting to avoid further humiliation, Philip decided not to propose the taxes to other large Flemish cities. Philip accused the deacons of perjury and removed them from the Council. In reaction, Ghent proposed to replace them with outspoken opponents of the Duke. Philip increased the pressure with measures such as recalling the bailiff twice, which brought all judicial procedures in the city to a halt.

The conflict escalated, and on 28 October 1451, the guilds proclaimed a general strike and took up arms. In December Biervliet was taken. In Ghent, a revolutionary rule of an assembly of the people was formed. Opponents of the revolt, who probably realised that their city could not win, were killed. This way Ghent lost the support of the councils of the other cities who saw their own power threatened. Only Ninove kept supporting Ghent because it was economically dependent on the city.

== War ==
On Friday, 31 March 1452, Philip the Good declared war on Ghent. A month later, in April 1452, the Ghent city government was forced to take military actions to secure supplies from the local region. They marched along the Scheldt river to Oudenaarde, Spiere and Helkijn, and along the Dender to Aalst and Geraardsbergen. Several strategic locations were taken and occupied by Ghent, amongst which a bridge of the Scheldt at Spiere, and the castles of:

- Poeke, west of Ghent, near Aalter, halfway to Bruges.
- Schendelbeke, along the Dender at Geraardsbergen, south of Ghent.
- Gavere, along the Scheldt between Ghent and Oudenaarde where the Ghent garrison of 50 men was supported by 16 English mercenaries.

At the siege of Oudenaarde, which lasted 12 to 13 days, the army of Ghent used one of the largest artillery bombardments to take place in Europe at the time, but the Burgundian garrison of the city, under the leadership of Simon de Lalaing, was able to withstand the attack. Geraardsbergen, where the Burgundian main force was located, also withstood a siege. The Burgundian main force was even able to unite with an army led by John of Burgundy, that marched from Seclin to relieve the sieges of Spiere and Helkijn on Friday 21 April, and relieved the siege of Oudenaarde on Monday 24 April. The forces of Ghent were forced to retreat, leaving behind their artillery on the banks of the Scheldt river. From 1 to 15 May Ghent was bombarded by the Burgundians, who eventually pulled back to Aalst, Dendermonde, and Oudenaarde.

During the constant skirmishes, Philip's favorite illegitimate son, Corneille of Burgundy was killed at the Battle of Bazel on 14 June 1452.

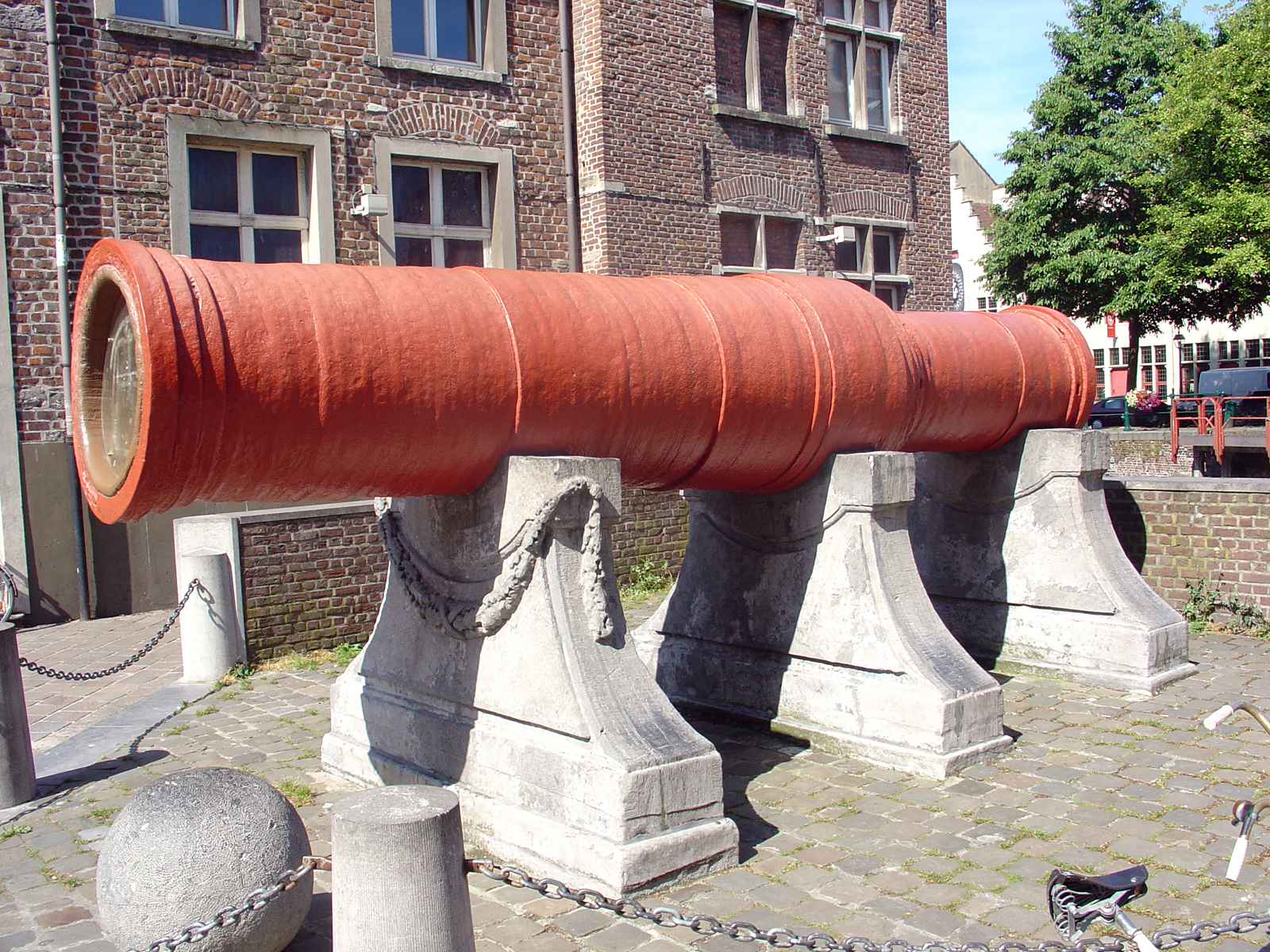
Dulle Griet, employed by the city of Ghent in the Siege of Oudenaarde.

In July the Burgundians took the upper hand; they had amongst others taken control of the land east of Ghent, and secured the neutrality of the other cities. King Charles VII of France negotiated a six-week truce between the two parties. Philip the Good strengthened his garrisons at Aalst, Dendermonde, Oudenaarde, and Kortrijk, and his army pulled back to France for the winter. During the entire winter the garrisons, as well as the whole Flemish region, were pillaged and plundered by troops from Ghent without intervention from Philip the Good. Ghent troops were nearly able to blow up the entire Burgundian winter supply of gunpowder in Lille, but an observant guard extinguished the fuse in time.

Philip attempted to negotiate a peace because Ghent, a rich city, was very valuable to him, but it refused any further negotiations. Halfway through 1453, Philip began a decisive military campaign that started on 18 June 1453. While a fleet moved up the Scheldt river from Sluis and Antwerp, Philip himself travelled from Lille in order to take the smaller Ghent possessions before marching on Ghent itself. On 27 June 1453, Schendelbeke was taken after two days of heavy artillery bombardment. After that the Poeke Castle was reduced to rubble from 2 to 5 July, though a prominent Knight of the Golden Fleece, Jacques de Lalaing, was killed. After every victory, all captured troops from Ghent were hanged and strangled; in Schendelbeke, 104 were killed. On 18 July, Burgundian troops reached the Gavere castle, the last bastion before the city of Ghent. At the castle, a decisive battle was fought.

After an artillery bombardment lasting five days, the English mercenary captain John Fox and his soldiers escaped from the castle. They were wearing Burgundian Crosses (confused with Saint Andrew's Cross by some) and knew the poorly chosen Burgundian password: Burgundy. They reached Ghent on Monday, 23 July, at around 5 o'clock in the morning. In the resulting panic in the city, a group of 25,000 men 'volunteered' (under threat of being hanged) to relieve Gavere Castle. The Burgundians, however, were well prepared for such an attempt. They chose the fields between Semmerzake and Gavere as the battlefield, where most troops had hidden themselves in the wooded valley of the Leebeek. When, at the first confrontation, the Ghent troops witnessed John Fox and his mercenaries defect to the Burgundian side, they realised that they had been betrayed.

Philip ordered an artillery barrage, and the Ghent army responded. However, at that critical moment, a Ghent cannoneer accidentally dropped his lighted match in a gunpowder barrel upon which everyone nearby ran away. The Ghent army panicked at seeing so many people flee, and the Ghent militia was destroyed in the ensuing battle in which 16,000 to 20,000 people died. Only the desperate resistance of 1,000 militia prevented Philip the Good from marching straight to Ghent; Charles the Bold charged the Ghent army with his knights and delivered his father, who had personally entered the fight and was in a difficult position.

When the remains of the fleeing army reached Ghent, the city decided to surrender without any further resistance, an outcome that pleased Philip. The humiliating Peace of Gavere ended the revolt of Ghent. The peace was also a definitive step towards the centralisation of Burgundian control at the cost of the power of the cities. Philip the Good's summer campaign had also reinforced the establishment of modern gunpowder artillery as a decisive factor in early modern battles.

For the whole duration of the revolt, Philip the Good expected and waited for the arrival of around 800 to 1,000 soldiers from the Duchy of Luxembourg, who eventually always arrived too late at every battle. Since the Duchy of Luxembourg had only been conquered by the Burgundians in 1443, most Luxembourgers and noblemen did not like the idea of serving a duke who was still seen a foreigner and occupier in Luxembourg. To avoid fighting and dying for Philip the Good, Luxembourger troops would use this strategy of deliberately arriving too late for years and always arriving at the battlefield when the fight was already over. However, since the soldiers always eventually arrived, Philip the Good had no other choice but to angrily accept this feat.

== See also ==
- Flemish revolts against Maximilian of Austria
