= Siege of Oudenaarde =

1452 siege

- Part of the Revolt of Ghent
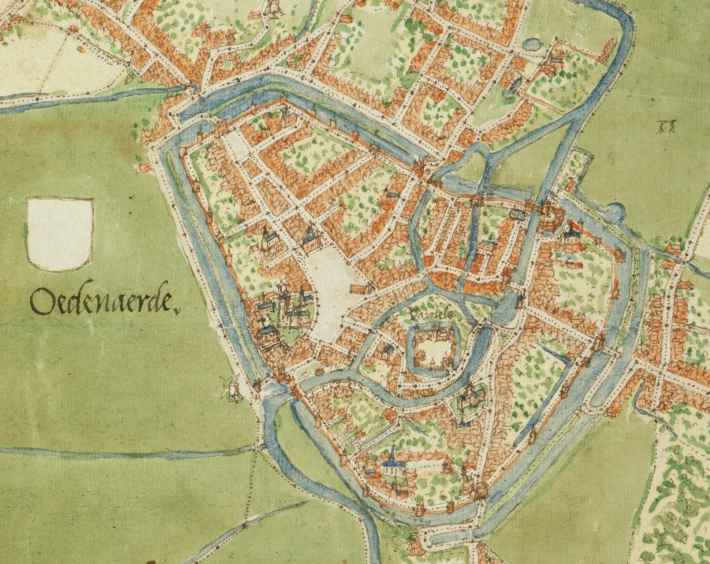
- Map of the city from the mid-sixteenth century, before the building of its trace italienne fortifications
Date	14–24 April 1452
Location	Oudenaarde, East Flanders (modern-day Belgium)
Result	Burgundian victory

Belligerents
Burgundian State	Ghent rebels

Commanders and leaders
Philip the Good; Simon de Lalaing; John II, Count of Nevers	3 unnamed captains

Casualties and losses
	c. 3,000

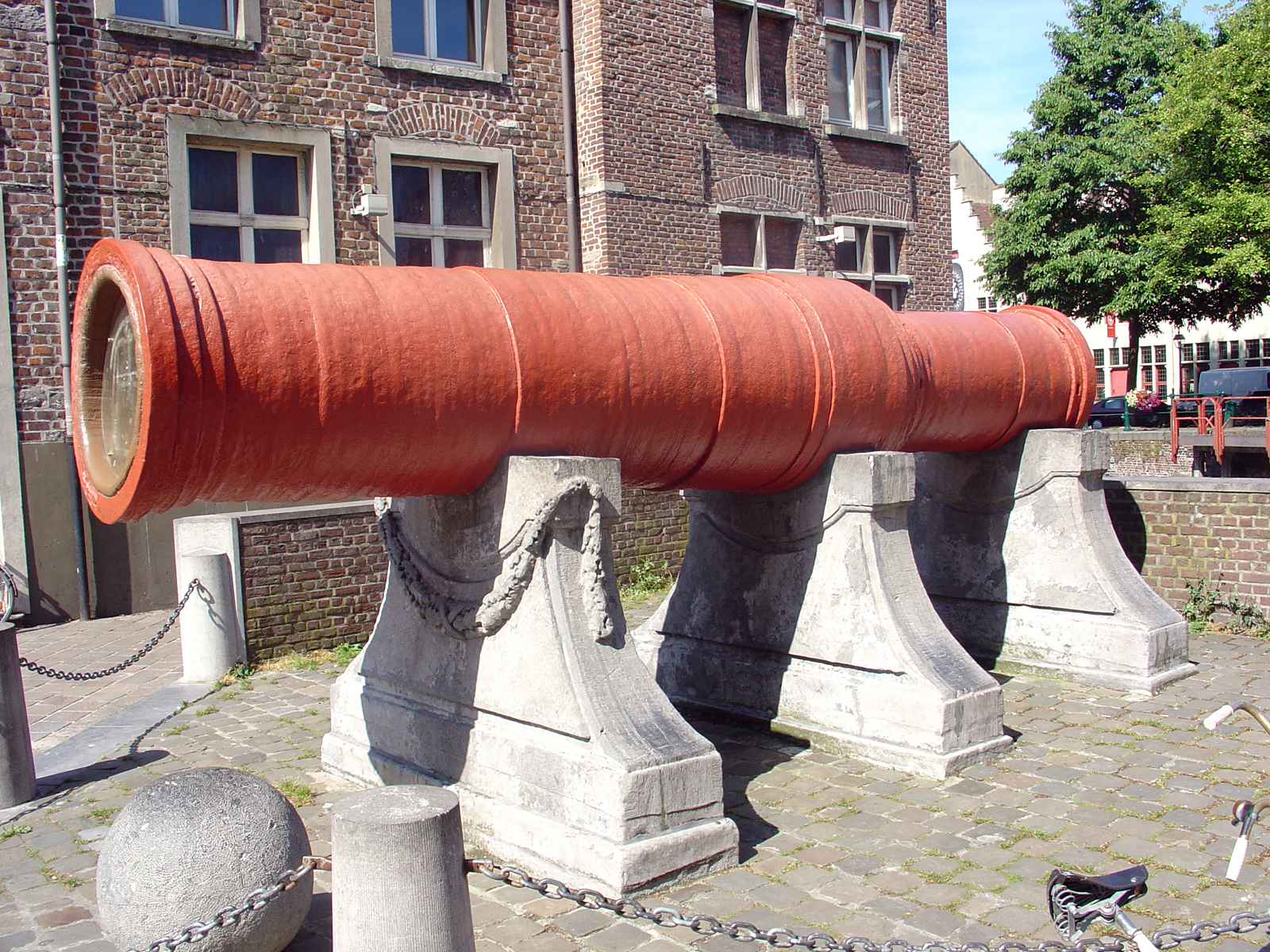
Dulle Griet, employed by the city of Ghent in the siege

The siege of Oudenaarde took place in 1452. It was one of the major engagements in the Revolt of Ghent (1449–53). The city was besieged by forces of the rebellious city of Ghent and defended by forces led by Simon de Lalaing, one of the leading captains of Philip the Good, Duke of Burgundy. The siege included one of the largest artillery bombardments then seen in Europe. The relief of the town by forces under Philip and his allies opened the way for an attack on Ghent by the Burgundian forces. In 1453 the rebels were defeated at the Battle of Gavere.

== Background ==
The revolt of Ghent began as resistance of the civic representatives to the growing power of the Valois Dukes of Burgundy over their city, with popular support, particularly over attempts by the Duke, Philip the Good to impose indirect taxes, including a salt tax on the city, similar to the French Gabelle, from 1447. The civic authorities were overthrown by a popular movement that ruled through a general assembly. Most of the major neighbouring towns, afraid of popular revolt in their own locations, sided with the Duke and he declared war on Ghent on 31 March 1452. The Duke attempted to blockade the city by garrisoning surrounding towns, including Oudenaarde, which lies further up on the River Scheldt, which he put under the command of one of his leading captains Simon de Lalaing. Ghent attempted to take these surrounding towns to break the blockade and to form a line of defence against the forces of the Duke and his allies.

== Course ==
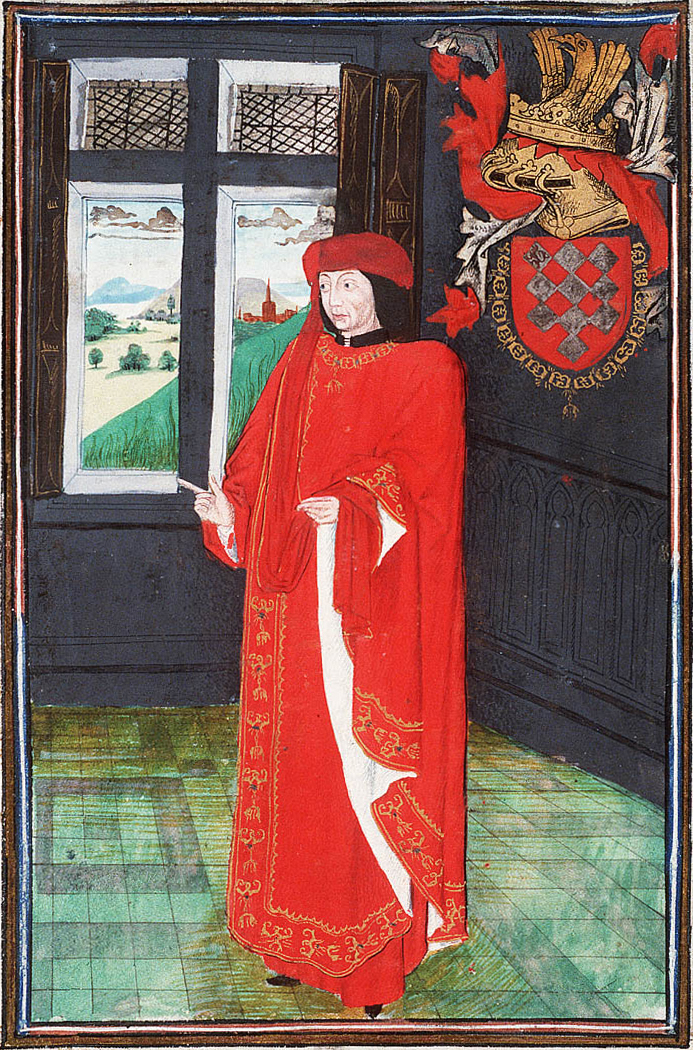
Simon de Lalaing (1405–77), Burgundian commander of the defence of the city

Under the command of three unnamed captains, the Ghenters laid siege to Oudenaarde on 14 April 1452, also occupying Espierres, attacking Aalst and later (on 16 April) unsuccessfully attempting to take Grammont. They threw two bridges over the Scheldt on either side of the city so that they could attack from both banks. De Lalaing prepared to resist the attackers by burning the suburbs of the city. The Ghenters transported a large amount of artillery by the river, described by one chronicler as including bombards, cannons, veuglaries, and serpentines. Among these was the huge bombard known as Dulle Griet, which weighed more than 16 tons. The defenders also had a large number of artillery pieces and the resulting artillery duel over the course of the siege was one of the largest seen in Europe until that point. The defenders organised firewatch parties to counter incendiary projectiles launched into the city at night and tanks of water in the street to put out fires.

The attackers used psychological warfare, shooting messages into the city that indicated that De Lalaing was planning to betray the city to them. They paraded two boys, which they claimed were De Lalaing's two sons, captured in a raid into Hainault and promised to kill them if he did not surrender, to which De Lalaing replied with a cannonade. De Lalaing was almost killed when he fell into the river as he was returning from inspecting the watch, but this was unknown to the besiegers.

== Relief ==
While the siege was underway the Duke mustered his main force at Grammont and his cousin and ally John II, Count of Nevers, his forces at Seclin. The count with 3,000 men took the bridge at Espierres and nearby Helchin and then advanced to relieve the city on 24 April. The Ghenters on the west bank of the city fled, abandoning most of their artillery, including Dulle Griet, and their baggage. The rebel forces on the east bank then also fled and were pursued by the Duke's forces to the gates of Ghent. According to the Duke, large numbers were captured and killed. The chronicler Enguerrand de Monstrelet stated that the common opinion was that more than 3,000 Ghenters were killed in the pursuit, while the Count lost only one man, a man-at-arms. The three captains escaped to Ghent, but were executed and five new leaders elected in their place.

== Aftermath ==
From 1 to 15 May Ghent was bombarded by the Burgundians, who eventually pulled back to Aalst, Dendermonde, and Oudenaarde. The final attack on the rebels was delayed by an embassy from Charles VII of France, peace negotiations, and financial difficulties in paying the ducal army. The next year the rebels were decisively at the Battle of Gavere on 23 July 1453 and signed a treaty, the Peace of Gavere, which restored the traditional government of the city and enhanced ducal authority.
