= Jacques de Lalaing =

Medieval Walloon knight (1421–1453)

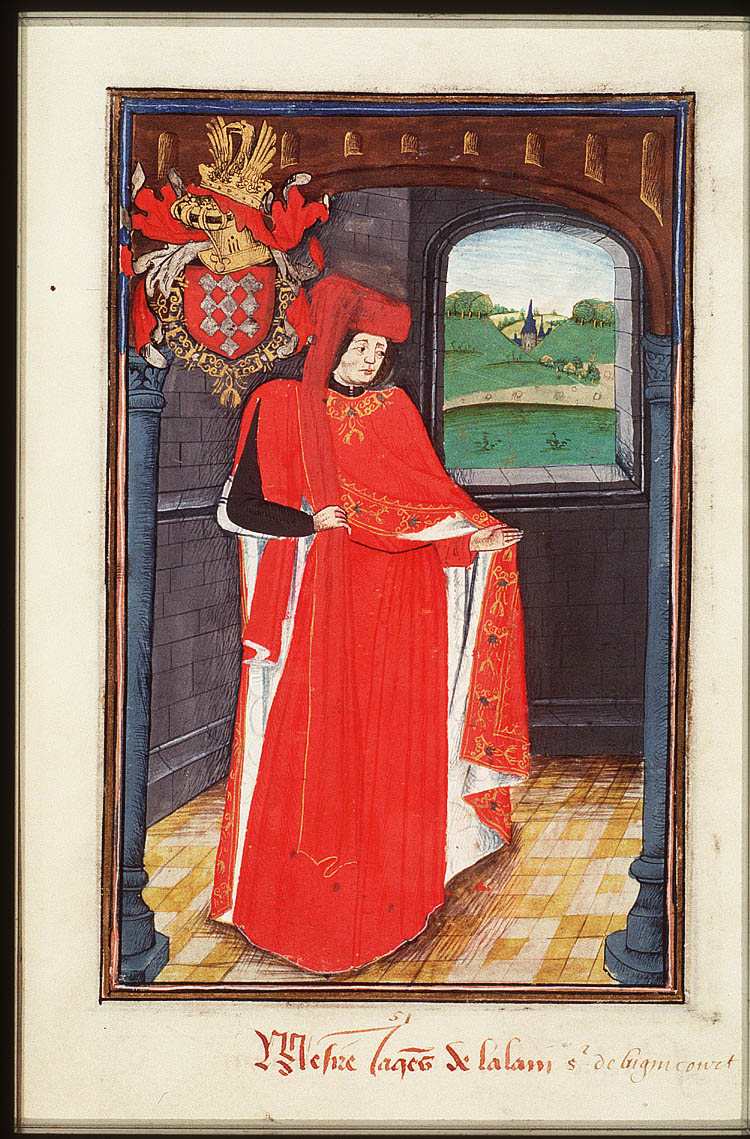
Jacques de Lalaing (1421–1453)

Jacques de Lalaing (1421–1453) was a 15th century knight of Burgundy and was reportedly one of the best medieval tournament fighters of all time. A Walloon knight, he began his military career in the service of Adolph I, Duke of Cleves, but was quickly noticed by Philip the Good, Duke of Burgundy by whom he was knighted and whom he went on to serve. Jacques, known as the "Bon Chevalier" due to his military prowess in tournaments and battles. Jacques was inducted into the prestigious Burgundian chivalric order, the Order of the Golden Fleece, in 1451. Jacques' deeds in tournaments and battles were recorded in the Livre des Faits de Jacques Lalaing (The Book of the Deeds of Jacques de Lalaing) attributed mainly to the Burgundian chroniclers Jean Le Fevre de Saint-Remy, Georges Chastellain, and the herald Charolais. Throughout his life, Jacques was entrusted by the Duke of Burgundy to serve in delegations to the King of France and the Pope, as well as with the suppression of the Revolt of Ghent in 1453.

== Family and early life ==
Jacques was born to the prominent Lalaing family in the County of Hainaut, the eldest son of Guillaume de Lalaing and Jeanne de Crequy. Jacques had three brothers: John who was provost of Saint-Lambert's Cathedral in Liege, Philippe who was a godson of Philip the Good, and Antoine who was killed by the Swiss while fighting for the Duke of Burgundy Charles the Bold. Jacques also had a half-brother named John who was the Lord of Haubourdin. Additionally, Jacques had three sisters: Yoland who married the Lord of Brederode and Baron of Holland, Isabeau who married Pierre of Henin-Lietard Lord of Bossu and Great Baron of Hainaut, and Jeanne of Esclaibes (+1475) who married Philippe of Bourbon (1429–1492), Lord of Duisans, bailiff of Lens and Hénin-Liétard, son of John, Lord of Carency.

Jacques was the nephew of Simon de Lalaing who was the Admiral of Flanders from 1436 to 1462. Simon was also renowned for his military prowess as a knight and was a member of the Order of the Golden Fleece.

As a child, Jacques was well-educated since literature was cultivated in Burgundy at the time of his youth. Therefore, he was learned in both Latin and French, and accomplished in literary work. But it was in warlike sports that he excelled the most. At a young age he went to the court of Philip the Good to serve and eventually become a knight. In 1436, he was sent by the Duke of Burgundy with 600 fighters to serve the King of France under the command of Marshal Jean de Villiers de L'Isle-Adam.

== His life—a model of medieval chivalry ==
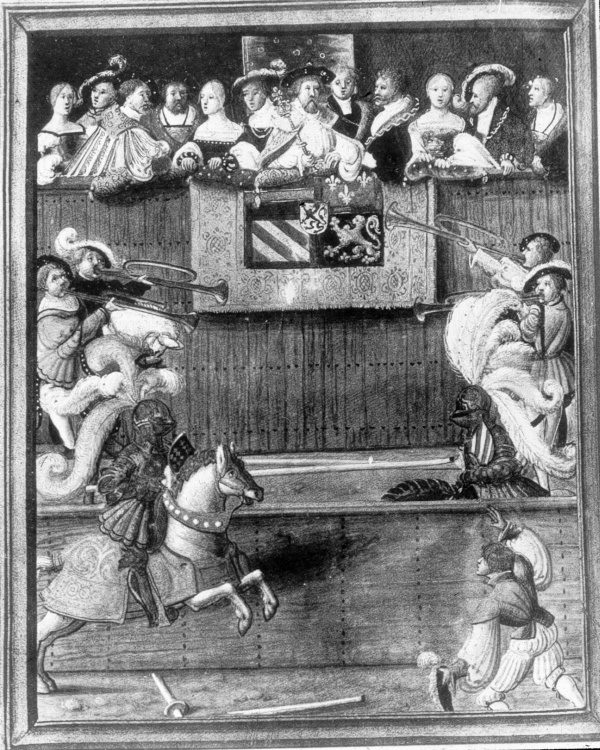
Jacques de Lalaing was one of the most accomplished knights with a lance and won numerous tournaments and pas d'armes bouts.

By the age of 20, Jacques had distinguished himself at a number of tournaments. On 22 November 1443, he accompanied Philip the Good's forces in a surprise assault on the city of Luxembourg where he "accomplished many magnificent feats of arms with both the lance and the sword."

Two years later in 1445, Jacques took part in a tournament in Nancy, Lorraine, France, where there were assembled King Charles VII of France, King Alfonso V of Aragon, and the nobility of France. Jacques performed spectacularly and was victorious over all of the knights with whom he did combat. For this success, he not only gained further celebrity status but received many material rewards.

Also in 1445, Jacques began his famous Feats of Arms. In these, he and another knight would fight a pre-arranged duel in full armor with sharpened weapons. The participants decided the rules of combat beforehand. Fighting typically included three courses each: with the lance on horseback, the sword on horseback, and the spear, poleaxe, sword, or dagger on foot. Sometimes these fights simply went on until one combatant was on the ground. Jacques' first feat of arms was against an Italian knight named Jean de Boniface from the court of King Alfonso V of Aragon. Jean had traveled through Lombardy, Savoy, Burgundy, and Flanders, seeking to distinguish himself in combat. Upon his arrival in Antwerp he made it known that he would take on all comers in combat. Jacques accepted this challenge and beat him.

The example of Jean de Boniface made a strong impression on Jacques, and in 1446 he decided to take up the profession of knight-errant, traveling from court to court with his entourage of 80 to 100 men-at-arms searching for opportunities to gain fighting acclaim. Traveling to France, and then to Navarre and Castile, Jacques sought combat with whoever would fight. Unfortunately, both King Charles VII of France and King John II of Navarre denied him permission to fight, probably because they did not want to spend money on an expensive tournament. However, after riding through Spain and Portugal, he was given the chance to fight in Valladolid on 3 February 1447, when King John II of Castile allowed him to fight Diego de Guzman, the son of the Grandmaster of the Spanish Order of Calatrava. Combat began on foot, and Jacques was so successful in beating his rival that the mounted combat never took place. On his way back home to Hainault, Jacques stopped in Aragon but was refused permission to fight yet again.

Jacques de Lalaing travelled to Stirling Castle, Scotland, for a tournament held on Shrove Tuesday 1449. He fought members of the Douglas clan at the court of King James II of Scotland. A combat of six took place, with Jacques fighting alongside his uncle Simon de Lalaing and a squire from Brittany named Hervey de Meriadet. Their opponents were James Douglas the brother of the Earl of Douglas, James Douglas of Ralstoun, and John Ross of Hawkhead. The audience numbered five or six thousand. Jacques' side was victorious. James II knighted the six combatants before the tournament and congratulated them afterwards.

After the victory in Scotland, Jacques and his companions traveled to England where they were denied permission to fight by King Henry VI of England. But shortly before his departure to return home, Jacques was challenged by an English squire named Thomas Que to fight in Burgundy. This combat took place later in 1449 in Bruges, Flanders with the Duke of Burgundy as referee, at a tournament held to celebrate the marriage of James II of Scotland and Mary of Guelders. While initially Thomas' poleaxe was disqualified due to its being oversized and oversharp, he pleaded so persistently that Jacques allowed its use. During combat, Jacque was stabbed through the wrist by Thomas' poleaxe, but went on to win the combat anyway.

Later, on that same day, Jacques announced his intention to raise a pavilion and have a pas d'armes (passage of arms). He desired to take on all comers for a set time period, specifically on the first day of every month for a year. Jacques' pas d'armes challenge was officially known as the Passage of the Fountain of Tears. This was due to the pavilion being next to a fountain with a statue of a weeping woman. In keeping with this theme, Jacques fought in a white surcoat decorated with a pattern of blue tears. The reason given for having this pas d'armes was that Jacques wanted to fight 30 men before his 30th birthday. It lasted from 1 November 1449 to 30 September 1450.

No one was willing to accept Jacques' challenge until 1 February 1450. This challenger was a Burgundian squire named Pierre de Chandio. The fighting took place in Chalons, France, on a small island in the middle of the Saône River. It began with a great ceremony, although the combat was uneventful as Jacques won handily over Pierre. In March, Sir Jean de Boniface who Jacques had beaten previously, returned to challenge him. The first day's combat was inconclusive, but during the second day's combat Jacques was able to again beat Jean. In June, a Burgundian squire named Gerard de Roussillon accepted the challenge. Jacques quickly won this combat. On 1 October 1450, seven noblemen accepted the challenge. The first was a squire named Claude Pitois, lord of Saint-Bonnet. The second was Aime de Rabutin, lord of Espiry. The third was a squire named Jean de Villeneuve. The fourth was named Gaspar de Durtain. The fifth was Jacques d'Avanchier. The sixth was a Burgundian squire named Guillaume d'Amange. And the seventh was a squire named Jean Pitois. Combat began on the next day. While initially several of these bouts were draws, Jacques would go on to win against all comers. As the pas d'armes ended, Jacques remained undefeated, winning great renown. Afterward he made a pilgrimage to Rome, returning in triumph to the court of Philip the Good. As a reward for his valor, Jacques was then admitted into the Order of the Golden Fleece in 1451 in the town of Mons.

On his pilgrimage to Rome in 1450, Jacques, like a medieval chivalrous knight of old, "like another Lancelot", stayed at Chalons on the Marne and crossed lances with anyone who would fight him on the road.

In 1452, Jacques jousted against Charles, Count of Charolais, who would go on to be Duke of Burgundy Charles the Bold in 1467. This was Charles' first jousting tournament. In the first joust Jacques broke his lance upon the Count but did not unhorse him. In the second joust, both broke their lances upon each other, yet both stayed in the saddle. Philip the Good considered it a good match and delightfully ended the bout. The Count would go on to win the prize of the tournament. This was the last tournament that Jacques would participate in since war broke out soon afterward.

Throughout his life, Jacques displayed all the main elements of what was considered to be the ideal medieval chivalrous knight. His military prowess was unmatched, he came from a respected and noble family, at a young age his frank bearing was noticeable, throughout his life he showed great loyalty to his lord the Duke of Burgundy, as a young man he was known to be a favorite of the ladies at court, his largesse was evident after his victories, and his religious piety was shown by such actions as his pilgrimage to Rome in 1450. He truly seems to have been the culmination of medieval chivalric ideals.

== Death ==
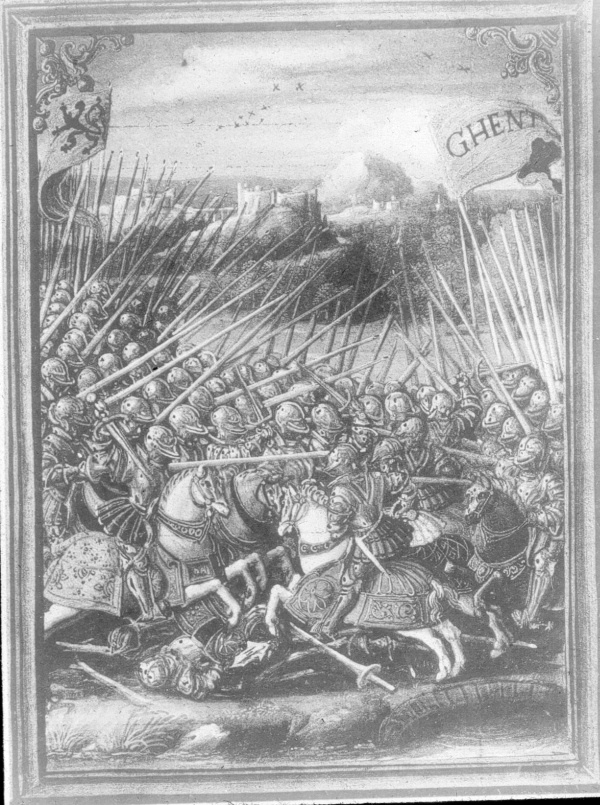
Jacques de Lalaing was killed by gunfire during the suppression of the Revolt of Ghent in 1453.

Jacques was killed in battle during the Revolt of Ghent on 3 July 1453, fighting for Philip the Good. While minor details differ, it appears that he was killed by cannon fire from defenders of Poucques Castle. He is one of the first European noblemen to die from gunfire. Jacques is therefore a transitional character, the last great member of a chivalrous era destroyed by an element of changing modern times.

Philip the Good was so furious at the death of his favorite knight Jacques that when the Poucques Castle was taken he had all those captured in it hanged, priests, lepers and children excepted.

Jacques was buried in the church of Lalaing. Before the French Revolution an epitaph to Jacques was in the Notre Dame Cathedral.
