= Siege of Ghent =

Siege of Ghent may refer to:

- Siege of Ghent (1380–1386), by Charles VI of France during the Flemish Revolt
- Siege of Ghent (1583–1584), by Spanish general Alexander Farnese, Duke of Parma, against the defending Calvinist Republic of Ghent during the Eighty Years' War
- Siege of Ghent (1708), by British general John Churchill, 1st Duke of Marlborough, against the defending French Count de la Motte during the War of the Spanish Succession
- Four Days of Ghent (1789), a four-day siege by Patriot captain Jean-Baptiste Davaine against the defending Imperial Austrian army during the Brabant Revolution

== See also ==
- Revolt of Ghent (disambiguation)
