= Georges Chastellain =

15th-century French poet

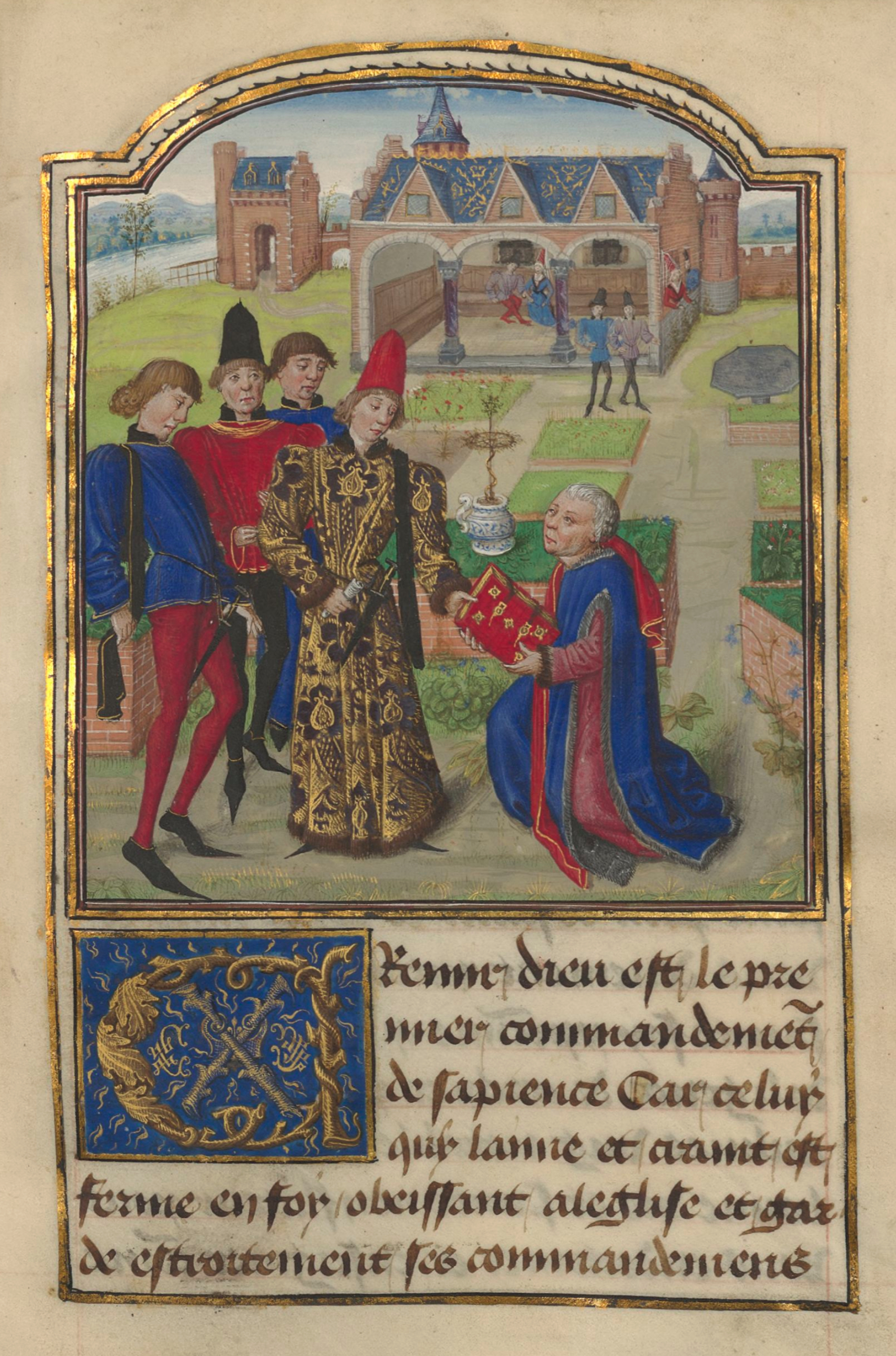
Charles the Bold accepting a book from Georges Chastellain, miniature in L'instruction d'un jeune Prince.

Georges Chastellain (c. 1405 or c. 1415 – 20 March 1475), Burgundian chronicler and poet, was a native of Aalst in Flanders. Chastellain's historical works are valuable for the accurate information they contain. As a poet he was famous among his contemporaries. He was the great master of the school of grands rhétoriqueurs, whose principal characteristics were fondness for the most artificial forms and a profusion of Latinisms and graecisms.

== Early life ==
Georges Chastellain derived his surname from the fact that his ancestors were burgraves or châtelains of the town; his parents, who belonged to illustrious Flemish families, were probably the Jean Chastellain and his wife Marie de Masmines mentioned in the town records in 1425 and 1432. A copy of an epitaph originally at Valenciennes states that he died on 20 March 1474-5 aged seventy. But since he states that he was so young a child in 1430 that he could not recollect the details of events in that year, and since he was an ecolier at Louvain in 1430, his birth may probably be placed nearer 1415 than 1405.

He saw active service in the Anglo-French wars and probably elsewhere, winning the surname of L'aventureux. In 1434 he received a gift from Philip the Good, duke of Burgundy, for his military services, but on the conclusion of the Peace of Arras in the next year he abandoned soldiering for diplomacy. The next ten years were spent in France, where he was connected with Georges de la Trémoille, and afterwards entered the household of Pierre de Brézé, at that time seneschal of Poitou, by whom he was employed on missions to the duke of Burgundy, in an attempt to establish better relations between Charles VII and the duke.

During these years Chastellain had ample opportunity of obtaining an intimate knowledge of French affairs, but on the further breach between the two princes, Chastellain left the French service to enter Philip's household. He was at first pantler, then carver, titles which are misleading as to the actual nature of his services, which were those of a diplomatist; and in 1457 he became a member of the ducal council. He was continually employed on diplomatic errands until 1455, when, owing apparently to ill-health, he received apartments in the palace of the counts of Hainaut at Salle-le-Comte, Valenciennes, with a considerable pension, on condition that the recipient should put in writing choses nouvelles et morales, and a chronicle of notable events. That is to say, he was appointed Burgundian historiographer with a recommendation to write also on other subjects not strictly within the scope of a chronicler.

== Mid-life ==
From this time he worked hard at his Chronique, with occasional interruptions in his retreat to fulfil missions in France or to visit the Burgundian court. He was assisted, from about 1463 onwards, by his disciple and continuator, Jean Molinet, whose rhetorical and redundant style may be fairly traced in some passages of the Chronique. Charles the Bold maintained the traditions of his house as a patron of literature, and showed special favor to Chastellain, who, after being constituted indiciaire or chronicler of the Order of the Golden Fleece, was himself made a knight of the order on 2 May 1473. He died at Valenciennes in 1475, on 13 February (according to the treasury accounts), or on 20 March (according to his epitaph). He left an illegitimate son, to whom was paid in 1524 one hundred and twenty livres for a copy of the Chronique intended for Charles V's sister Mary, queen of Hungary. Only about one third of the whole work, which extended from 1419 to 1474, is known to be in existence, but manuscripts carried by the Habsburgs to Vienna or Madrid may possibly yet be discovered.

Among his contemporaries Chastellain acquired a great reputation by his poems and occasional pieces now little considered. The unfinished state of his Chronique at the time of his death, coupled with political considerations, may possibly account for the fact that it remained unprinted during the century that followed his death, before his historical work was disinterred from the libraries of Arras, Paris and Brussels by the painstaking researches of Jean Alexandre Buchon in 1825.

Chastellain was constantly engaged during the earlier part of his career in negotiations between the French and Burgundian courts, and thus had personal knowledge of the persons and events dealt with in his history. A partisan element in writing of French affairs was inevitable in a Burgundian chronicle. This feature appears most strongly in his treatment of Joan of Arc; and the attack on Agnès Sorel seems to have been dictated by the dauphin (afterwards Louis XI), then a refugee in Burgundy, of whom he was afterwards to become a severe critic.

== Legacy ==
Among his most sympathetic portraits are those of his friend Pierre de Brézé and of Jacques Coeur. His French style, based partly on his Latin reading, has, together with its undeniable vigour and picturesqueness, the characteristic redundance and rhetorical quality of the Burgundian school. Chastellain was no mere annalist, but proposed to fuse and shape his vast material to his own conclusions, in accordance with his political experience. The most interesting feature of his work is the skill with which he pictures the leading figures of his time. His characters are the fruit of acute and experienced observation, and abound in satirical traits, although the 42nd chapter of his second book, devoted expressly to portraiture, is headed Comment Georges escrit et mentionne les louanges vertueuses des princes de son temps.

The known extant fragments of Chastellain's Chroniques with his other works were edited by Joseph Kervyn de Lettenhove for the Brussels Academy (8 vols., Brussels, 1863–1866) as L'Oeuvre de Georges Chastellain. This edition includes all that had been already published by Buchon in his Collection de chroniques and Choix de chroniques (material subsequently incorporated in the Panthéon littéraire), and portions printed by Renard in his Trésor national, vol. i. and by Quicherat in the Procès de la Pucelle vol. iv. Kervyn de Lettenhove's text includes the portions of the chronicle covering the periods September 1419 to October 1422, January 1430 to December 1431, 1451–1452, July 1454 to October 1458, July 1461 to July 1463, and, with omissions, June 1467 to September 1470; and three volumes of minor pieces of considerable interest, especially Le Temple de Boccace, dedicated to Margaret of Anjou, and the Déprécation for Pierre de Brézé when imprisoned by Louis XI. In the case of these minor works the attribution to Chastellain is in some cases erroneous, notably in the case of the Livre des faits de Jacques de Lalaing, which is the work of Lefebvre de Saint-Remi, Herald of the Golden Fleece. In the allegorical Oultré d'amour it has been thought a real romance between Pierre de Brézé and a lady of the royal house is concealed.

== Works ==
- Chronique des choses de mon temps, a history of the years 1417–74, of which only fragments remain, continued after Chastellain's death, by his disciple, Jean Molinet. It was first edited by Buchon in Les chroniques nationales (1827) and re-edited by Kervyn de Lettenhove (8 vols., Brussels, 1863–67).
- "Louange à la tresglorieuse Vierge" (c. 1455). Ed. by Cynthia J. Brown as part of: "Variance and Late Medieval Mouvance: Reading an Edition of Georges Chastellain's 'Louange à la tresglorieuse Vierge,' in: Translation, Transformation, and Transubstantiation, ed. Carol Poster and Richard Utz (Evanston: IL: Northwestern University Press, 1998), pp. 123–75 (original text and English translation on pp. 136–75)
- Récollections des merveilles advenues en mon temps (Antwerp, 1505).
- Chronique de Messire Jean de Lalaing, a delightful biography.
