= Semmerzake =

- Village
- Interactive map of Semmerzake
- Coordinates: 50°56′34″N 3°39′47″E
- Country: Belgium
- Region: Flanders
- Province: East Flanders
- Municipality: Gavere

Area
  - Total: 4.60 km^{2} (1.78 sq mi)

Population (1 January 2025)
  - Total: 1,587
  - Density: 345/km^{2} (890/sq mi)
- Postal code: 9890

Semmerzake is a village in the Flemish Region of Belgium, located in the province of East Flanders. It is a submunicipality of Gavere and was an independent municipality until the municipal reorganization of 1977.

== History ==
Archaeological finds indicate that the area of Semmerzake was inhabited during the Gallo-Roman and Merovingian periods. The name "Semmerzake" is derived from the Gallo-Roman Cimbrasiaco, referring to the estate of a person, and was first recorded as Cimbarsaca in 814 in a document of the Saint Peter's Abbey in Ghent.

Historically, Semmerzake formed part of the Land of Aalst. In 1453, fighting related to the nearby Battle of Gavere, the decisive engagement of the Ghent Revolt (1449–1453), took place in the vicinity, where forces of the city of Ghent were defeated by Philip the Good, Duke of Burgundy.

Semmerzake remained an independent municipality until 1 January 1977, when it was merged into Gavere.

== Geography ==
Semmerzake is located along the Scheldt River at an elevation of approximately 7.5 metres. The surrounding landscape includes the Scheldt valley and areas of former clay extraction used for brick production.

== Landmarks ==
Notable sites in Semmerzake include the Church of Saint Peter in Chains and the remains of the windmill De Ronne. The village centre is designated as a protected village landscape.

== Economy and infrastructure ==
Clay extraction in the Scheldt valley historically supported brick production in the area. Semmerzake is also home to a military air traffic control facility, the Air Traffic Control Center.
