= Four Days of Ghent =

- Part of the Brabant Revolution
Date	13–16 November 1789
Location	Ghent, Flanders, Austrian Netherlands
Result	Brabant victory

Belligerents
Brabant rebels	Habsburg monarchy

Commanders and leaders
Philippe Devaux (until 13 November); Jean-Baptiste Davaine	Richard d'Alton; Gottfried von Schröder; Nicolas d'Arberg; Jacques de Lunden

Strength
c. 1,500	c. 5,000

Casualties and losses
79 dead civilians (including 48 armed civilians); 32 dead Patriots	c. 600 dead c. 200 wounded 1,000 POWs

The Four Days of Ghent (Dutch: Vier Dagen van Gent, French: Quatre Journées de Gand) refers to a battle in Ghent, the capital of Flanders, 13–16 November 1789, in which the Imperial Army of the Holy Roman Emperor was driven out of the city. It was a crucial event during the Brabant Revolution: the Patriots received a major boost by taking this first large city, and the authority of the Austrian Netherlands was beginning to disintegrate. Within two weeks, the Treaty of Union was drafted, which established the independent republic of the United Belgian States on 11 January 1790. On 4 January 1790, Flanders declared its independence from the Habsburg monarchy by the Manifesto of the Province of Flanders.

== Background ==
Ghent was not a bulwark of Patriot activity. Therefore, the Austrian military governor Richard d'Alton judged it useful to concentrate his troops in De Kempen and around Liège, and leave only a garrison of 300 men in Ghent (two companies of the Vierset regiment). According to his expectations, the Committee of Breda, which had retreated its small Patriot army after its victory in the Battle of Turnhout (27 October 1789), would focus its attention again on Brabant. Patriot leader Jan Frans Vonck, who had always been advocating an attack on Flanders, was now able to gather support for this plan, especially after notary Jan Baptist Cammaert had crossed the border in the beginning of November to confirm the information on the small Ghent garrison.

On 4 November, the French major Philippe Devaux advanced from Roosendaal with 800 soldiers to the Waasland. After crossing the river Scheldt on 7 November at the former fort Frederik Hendrik in Berendrecht with some difficulties, and being reinforced with 200 Patriots from the camp of Hulst, he encamped in Sint-Niklaas on 9 November. The population reacted with caution rather than enthusiasm. The Waasland volunteers who joined the Patriot army were fewer than hoped for, but in his justification after the fact, d'Alton reported them to have numbered 500. The rebels put themselves in motion, and picked up several small cannons at the D'Ursel Castle, as promised by Duchess d'Ursel. Meanwhile, the Austrian response was rather slow. D'Alton was not informed of the movements until 8 November, at which point he urgently sent reinforcements under Gontroeul and Gottfried von Schröder; however, because of lingering, they lost three more valuable days, and were no longer able to cut off the road to Ghent. Then d'Alton also sent a regiment (c. 2,400 infantrymen) led by Nicolas Antoine d'Arberg to Ghent, where the garrison was also strengthened by the 600 men advancing from Aalst under colonel Jacques-Henri de Lunden. Only Lunden would arrive in time, meaning that Ghent was defended by about 900 men when the Patriots appeared before the city gates on Friday 13 November.

== Course ==
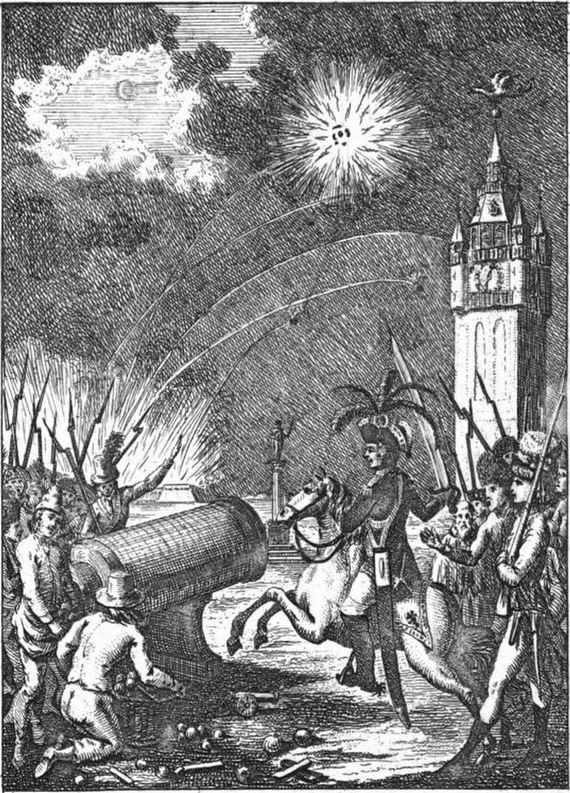
Print portraying the Patriot victory, with the Belfry and Dulle Griet as symbols of Ghent.

On the morning of 13 November, just before 7 a.m., Devaux ordered a charge on the Bruges Gate (Brugse Poort) and the Sas Gate (Saspoort). A simultaneous attack on the Antwerp Gate (Antwerpse Poort) was carried out to distract the enemy. Noting that a handful of gate guards spread great confusion amongst his inexperienced troops, Devaux simply gave up. He departed back to the Netherlands, together with Louis de Ligne, his staff and all eight dragoons of the army. However, the Patriots would not yield so easily, and continued under the command of captain Jean-Baptiste Davaine. They took the Bruges Gate, and the Sas Gate with some difficulty as well, and advanced towards the Kouter square in the centre. There they clashed with the barricades put up by Lunden at strategic locations in the city (Madou Bridge, Ketel Bridge, Muink Bridge, Heuver Gate and Kortrijk Gate). His main force was garrisoned inside Saint Peter's Abbey, and the Spanjaardenkasteel ('Spaniards' Castle') also had a small occupation force. The Patriots pushed the Imperials back far beyond the Madou and Ketel bridges.

When the night fell, plundering started. Primarily the Imperial troops, most notably the "Clerfayt" Regiment, badly misbehaved by robbing, raping and killing about. Both Imperial and Patriot sources report an astonishing lack of discipline amongst the Imperial soldiers, and that their crimes committed against civilians at the early stages of combat was a crucial factor in motivating the civilian population of Ghent to side with the rebels. The Patriots aimed for the houses of royalist dignitaries, many of which were razed to the ground. By now, they received almost full support from the Ghent locals, who broke up entire streets in order to throw paving stones at the Imperials. The Austrian reinforcements arriving during the night (Gontroeul's c. 2,400 men) and morning were informed of this, and decided to take up positions inside the Spanjaardenkasteel after passing through the Antwerp Gate. Turnhout had taught them to be careful with urban combat.

On Saturday 14 November, Arberg ordered a bombardment on the city from the Spanjaardenkasteel, which was now defended by several thousands of soldiers. This caused fires at several places. From inside the Kattenberg barracks, Lunden tried to alert his allies to his precarious position by firing several cannon shots, but they were lost in the clamour of battle. A detachment of a hundred soldiers which he ordered to sally forth, was caught and neutralised. At dusk, new attempts at plundering were made from the Spanjaardenkasteel, but the defenders were prepared and drove them back, inflicting heavy losses.

The following day, 15 November, commenced with a fresh bombardment, followed by an Imperial sortie from the castle the around noon. The Patriot soldiers fired with many rifles, while civilians threw stones and other debris from rooftops at the Austrians. Schröder, bothered by his defeat in Turnhout, fought in the front line. After just 15 minutes of fighting, a 14-year-old rebel firing a large nail from a kind of self-made blunderbuss struck his leg, after which Schröder ordered a retreat. Emboldened by this success, many Patriots wanted to storm the Kattenberg barracks in a rush, but Devaine managed to retain their discipline and ordered an end to the fighting for the day. Around nightfall, the city administration granted the Patriots permission to take weapons and ammunition from the city storages. Moreover, captain Alison with 250 fighters from Kortrijk and four cannons came to reinforce the rebels.

On 16 November, with renewed courage, the Patriots assaulted the barracks garrisoned by Lunden, whose troops were suffering from food shortages. The rebels set a storage on fire and shelled the barracks with the Kortrijk guns. Soon after, the colonel appeared in front of a window with a white flag to surrender the barracks. His men were spared from the people's rage, and imprisoned in monasteries. Next, the liberation committee sent a message to the Spanjaardenkasteel that the bombardments had to cease if they wished to spare the lives of Lunden and his officers. The threat worked. In fact, the Imperials silently abandoned their citadel in the night of 16 to 17 November. The Patriots were utterly surprised when they discovered the Austrian withdrawal the next morning. Contrary to Arberg's orders, his rearguard had not burnt the citadel's supplies, perhaps for fear of them falling into rebel hands. When the retreating Imperial army marched to Brussels, many soldiers born in the Southern Netherlands deserted; many of them were caught by the peasant population and carried off to Ghent; they killed some of the plundering deserters.

Inside the city, 27 houses were burnt down, with dozens of others damaged. 600 Imperial soldiers were killed, 200 were wounded, and over a thousand had been made prisoners of war, held captive in monasteries. The Patriot army suffered 32 casualties, while 79 Ghent civilians were killed in the fighting, 31 of whom were unarmed.

== Aftermath ==
Because of the conquest of Ghent, the rest of the county of Flanders sided with the Patriots in a matter of days. The Imperial forces, plagued by desertion, surrendered Brussels almost without a fight. Within several weeks, they were pushed back beyond the Prince-Bishopric of Liège (which at the time was controlled by the pro-Patriot Liège Republic) towards the Fortress of Luxembourg. Emperor Joseph II was not amused: after the loss of Ghent, he suspended Schröder, disgraced d'Alton and forced Arberg to resign. The emperor soon entered his deathbed, and told prince Charles de Ligne that it was because of the Brabant Revolution:

'Votre pays m'a tué: Gand pris a été mon agonie; et Bruxelles abandonnée, ma mort.'
('Your country has killed me: the capture of Ghent was my agony, and the abandonment of Brussels was my death').

After Joseph's death, the United Belgian States managed to consolidate themselves for several months. However, the Patriots would suffer from internal strife in this time, and failed to prepare themselves for a new Austrian offensive. General Bender would put a relatively quick end to the first Belgian adventure of independence in November and December 1790. The First Austrian Restoration would last until the French revolutionary army under Dumouriez crushed the Imperials again in the Battle of Jemappes (6 November 1792).

== See also ==
- Brabant Revolution
- Revolt of Ghent (disambiguation)

== Literature ==
- Roger Van Aerde, De Brabantse Omwenteling - De gevechten te Gent (pdf), in: Gendtsche Tydinghen, 1985, no. 3, pp. 124–143
- Désiré Destanberg, Gent onder Jozef II, 1780-1792, 1910, pp. 183–192
- Charles Terlinden, "Les Quatre Journées de Gand, 13-16 novembre 1789", in: L'Almanach de la Société générale gantoise des étudiants catholiques, 1908, pp. 109–130
- Joseph-Jean De Smet, Les quatre journées de Gand, in: Revue de Bruxelles, 1839, pp. 138–159
