= Battle of Bazel =

1452 battle in Europe

- Part of the Revolt of Ghent
Date	16 June 1452
Location	Bazel, County of Flanders (modern-day Belgium)
Result	Burgundian victory

Belligerents
Burgundian State	Ghent rebels

Commanders and leaders
Philip the Good; Corneille of Burgundy †	Wouter Leenknecht

Strength
30,000	13,000

Casualties and losses
Unknown	c. 2,000

The Battle of Bazel was fought in the Belgian village of Bazel on June 16, 1452 between the army of Philip the Good, Duke of Burgundy and the rebelling city of Ghent. The battle was part of the Revolt of Ghent, and a victory for the Duke.

== Battle ==
The people of the Waasland, historically ruled from Ghent, had joined the Revolt of Ghent (1449-1453). An army of some 13,000 men under the command of Wouter Leenknecht had gathered in the village of Bazel. The Duke of Burgundy had brought important reinforcements to Flanders, after some embarrassing defeats against the rebels, especially in the Battle of Nevele (1452).

On June 14, the Duke had 30,000 men in Rupelmonde, and Leenknecht took up defensive positions in Bazel. Two days later, Duke Philips the Good lured the rebels out of their positions and defeated them during a battle in open field. 2,000 rebels were killed or captured, and the rest fled towards Ghent. During his flight, one of the rebels killed Corneille of Burgundy, Philip's favourite bastard son. As a revenge, Philip had all prisoners killed and lay the entire Waasland to waste.

Around 800-1,000 soldiers from the Duchy of Luxembourg (which Philip the Good had ordered to be present) deliberately arrived at the battle when the latter was already over in order to avoid fighting for a Duke they despised.
