= Cornille of Burgundy =

French noble (c. 1420 – 1452)

- Born: Cornille of Beveren c. 1420
- Died: 16 May 1452
- Spouse: Margareta Courbaulde
- Issue: Jérôme; Jean
- Parents: Philip the Good; Catherine Scaers

Cornille of Burgundy, also called Cornille of Beveren, (c. 1420 – 16 May 1452) was an illegitimate son of Philip the Good (Duke of Burgundy) and Catherine Scaers.

Cornille was the first and favourite illegitimate son of Philip the Good and received the titles of Grand Bâtard de Bourgogne, Lord of Beveren and Vlissingen, and was also Governor and Captain-General of the Duchy of Luxembourg.

In the city of Dijon in 1442, as recorded in court testimony, Cornille and several other men broke into the home of Jehan Lourdon, a sergeant of Duke Phillip the Good, and abducted Jehan's fifteen-year-old niece, Jehanotte le Bonnet. Both Jehan and his wife, Damoiselle Guillotte de Poinart, were badly injured in their struggle against the abductors. Jehanotte was taken to the Hostel de Saint Eloy, where the men planned to rape her, but the owner of the establishment, Jehanotte Vesne, heard Jehanotte's screams and attempted to break down the door of the room with an axe. One of the men, Droguezelle, a fool in Cornille's father's employ, attacked Vesne to prevent any further interference and Jehanotte le Bonnet was taken to a nearby house where she was brutally beaten and raped by Seigneur Jehan de Cleres. She was then moved back to the Saint Eloy, where she was raped multiple times by Droguezelle. The men attempted to compel her to accept money from them, which she refused, so they placed the money in her purse by force. Jehanotte was rescued the next morning due to the efforts of Jehanotte Vesne, who had informed the girl's uncle of her whereabouts and urged him to send men to retrieve her. The deposition notes record the severity of Jehanotte's physical condition, her face having been beaten bloody, as well as her mental anguish. Though Cornille and Seigneur Jehan de Cleres were named by witnesses, only Droguezelle was officially accused, and none of the witnesses seem to have been willing to single Cornille out in their testimony. Cornille was never held legally accountable for Jehanotte's gang rape.

Although he never married, Cornille had two children with Margareta Courbaulde, Lady of Elverdinge:

- Jérôme, Bastard of Burgundy (1450–1471)
- Jean, Bastard of Burgundy (1450–1479), killed in the Battle of Guinegate (1479), Lord of Elverdinge and Vlamertinge, married with Marie de Halewyn, and father of two daughters.

After his death in the Battle of Bazel near Rupelmonde, Cornille was buried in the Church of St. Michael and St. Gudula (now Brussels' cathedral). All his titles and possessions went to his younger half-brother Anthony, bastard of Burgundy.

== Sources ==
- Vaughan, Richard (2010). Philip the Good: The Apogee of Burgundy. The Boydell Press.
- Akard, Lucia (2022). Victims and survivors of rape in late medieval France and Burgundy. Doctoral dissertation, University of Oxford.
