= Battle of Gavere =

1453 battle in Europe

Coordinates: 50.9333°N 3.65°E

- Part of the Revolt of Ghent
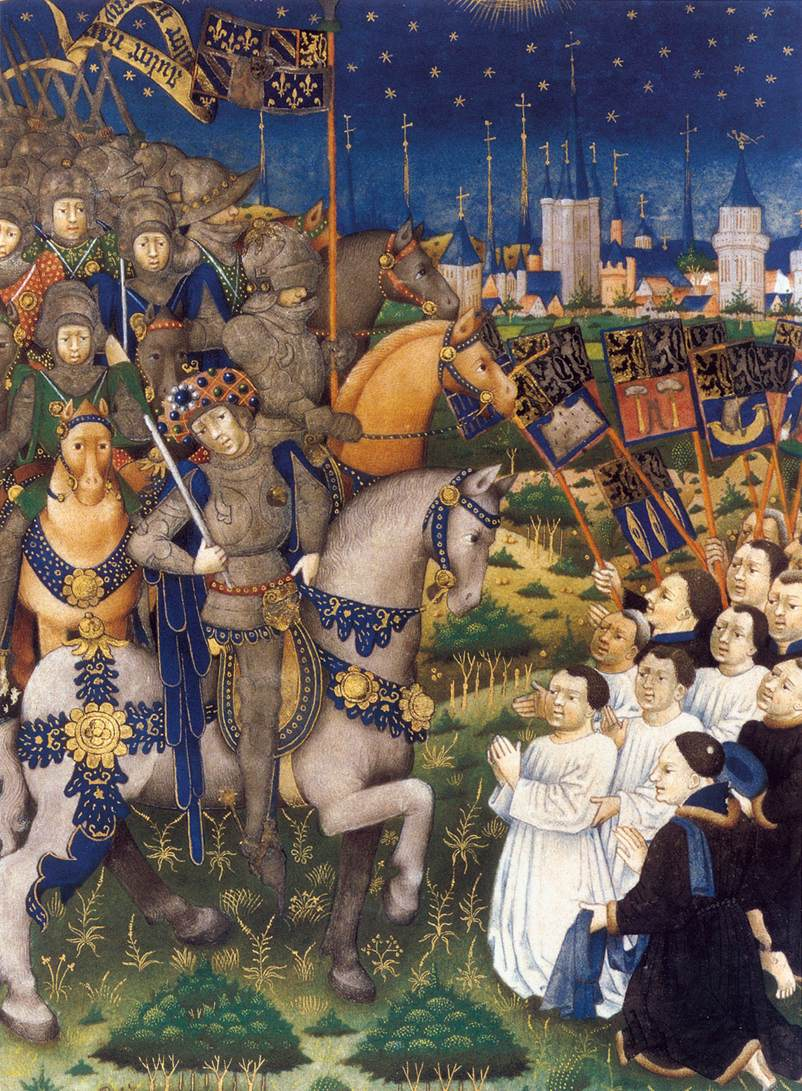
- The burghers of Ghent surrender to Philip the Good after the Battle of Gavere. Illustration from a contemporary manuscript.
Date	23 July 1453
Location	Semmerzake-Gavere, County of Flanders (modern-day Belgium)
Result	Burgundian victory: Peace of Gavere

Belligerents
Burgundian State	Ghent rebels

Commanders and leaders
Philip the Good (WIA); Louis de Gruuthuse	

Strength
Unknown	30,000(exaggeration)

Casualties and losses
	16,000–20,000

The Battle of Gavere was fought at Semmerzake, near Gavere, in the County of Flanders (modern-day Belgium) on 23 July 1453, between the army of Philip the Good of Burgundy and the rebelling city of Ghent. The battle ended the Revolt of Ghent with a Burgundian victory.

== Background ==
Ghent was the richest, most populous, and powerful city in the Burgundian Netherlands. The battle was a consequence of Ghent's opposition against a new salt tax. When the city openly declared its rebellion, the Duke assembled an army (Note: DeVries states the Ghentenaar's army was more numerous than the Burgundians.) from neighbouring lands, including southern Flanders, and attacked three fortifications; Schendelbeke, Poeke, and Gavere.

Schendelbeke and Poeke were both taken with little effort and both garrisons were executed. The Burgundian army began its bombardment of Gavere on 18 July. The Ghentenaar relief army arrived on 23 July, not knowing the fort had fallen the day before. Philip, aware of the approach of the Ghentenaar army, drew up his army into battle lines. Finding Philip's army battle ready, the Ghentenaar army formed up.

== Battle ==
The battle began with an artillery exchange, a first for the Burgundian army, and due to the superior range of the Ghentenaar artillery, Philip was forced to move his cannons closer to the enemy. Once in range, the Burgundian artillery began to weaken Ghentenaar morale, and numerous Ghentenaar soldiers fled. A Ghentenaar contemporary source claims a spark ignited an open sack of gunpowder causing an explosion which caused the Ghent cannoners to rout.

Seeing the enemy flee, the Burgundian army charged. Some Ghent soldiers regrouped to counter the charge, but their efforts were useless and casualties were high.

== Afterwards ==
It was feared the Duke would destroy the city completely, but when asked to show mercy he is said to have replied "If I should destroy this city, who is going to build me one like it?"

The battle broke the power of Ghent only temporarily, as in 1539 there would be another revolt against the high taxes under Charles V, Holy Roman Emperor (see Revolt of Ghent (1539)).

== Sources ==
- Crombie, Laura (2016). Archery and Crossbow Guilds in Medieval Flanders, 1300-1500. The Boydell Press.
- DeVries, Kelly (2010). "Battle of Gavere". In Rogers, Clifford J. (ed.). The Oxford Encyclopedia of Medieval Warfare and Military Technology. Vol. 2. Oxford University Press.
- Smith, Robert Douglas; DeVries, Kelly (2005). The Artillery of the Dukes of Burgundy, 1363-1477. The Boydell Press.
- Charles Terlinden, Histoire militaire des Belges, Brussels, La Renaissance du Livre, 1931.

== See also ==
- Loys of Gruuthuse
- Revolt of Ghent
