= Simon de Lalaing =

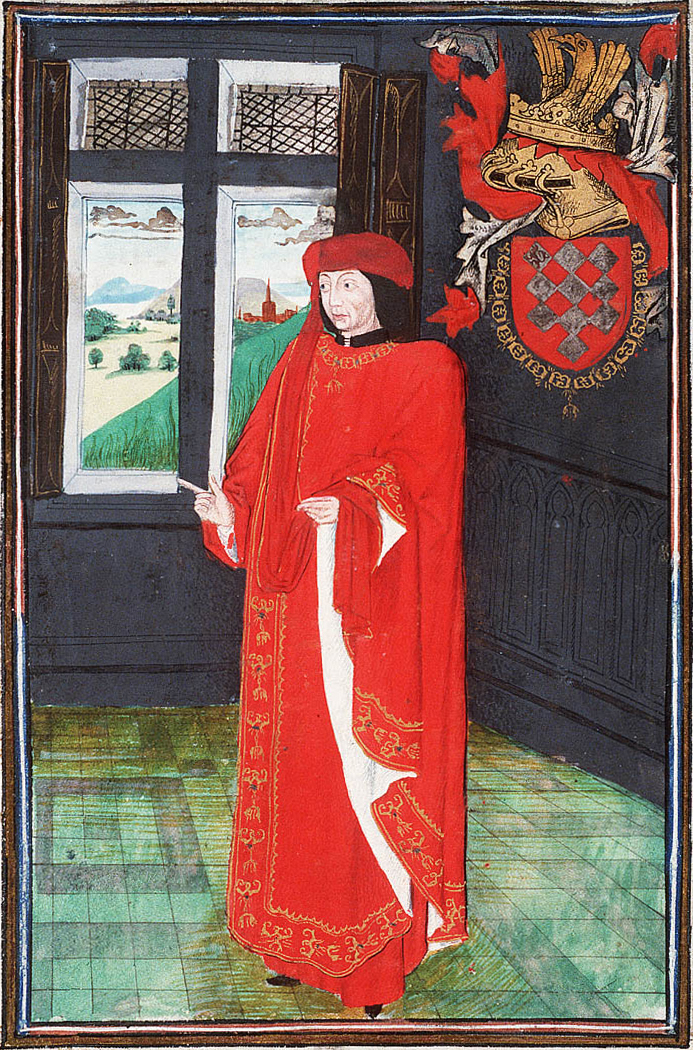
Simon de Lalaing (1405–1477)

Simon de Lalaing (1405–1476) was an Admiral of Flanders from 1436 to 1462, after which he relinquished the title to his eldest son Othon de Lalaing (+ 1441). He was made a knight of the Order of the Golden Fleece in 1431.

== Family ==
A member of the House of Lalaing. Simon was the 2nd son of Othon, Lord of Lalaing and Yolande of Barbançon, Lady of Montigny. He married Joanne Of Gavere, lady of Escornaix with whom he had two children, Joost, Lord of Montigny and Willem.

== Career ==
Between 1437 and 1438, with the approval of Philip the Good, he led the piracy targeted at English ships from the city of Sluis. Even though he was no longer admiral in 1464, he was involved in equipping the fleet for the crusade against the Ottomans that Pope Pius II had proclaimed. The crusade was led by Antoine, bastard of Burgundy, and Simon took part in it as well.

== Sources ==
- Sicking, L. (1998): Zeemacht en onmacht, Maritieme politiek in de Nederlanden, 1488 -1558, De Bataafsche Leeuw, Amsterdam.
