= Revolt of Ghent =

Revolt of Ghent may refer to:

- Revolt of Ghent (1379–1385), a rebellion by the city of Ghent against Louis II, Count of Flanders
- Revolt of Ghent (1449–53), a rebellion by the city of Ghent against Philip the Good, Duke of Burgundy
- Revolt of Ghent (1539–1540), an uprising by the citizens of Ghent against Charles V, Holy Roman Emperor
- Calvinist Republic of Ghent, independent republic (1577–1584) during the Dutch Revolt
