= Philip the Good =

Duke of Burgundy from 1419 to 1467

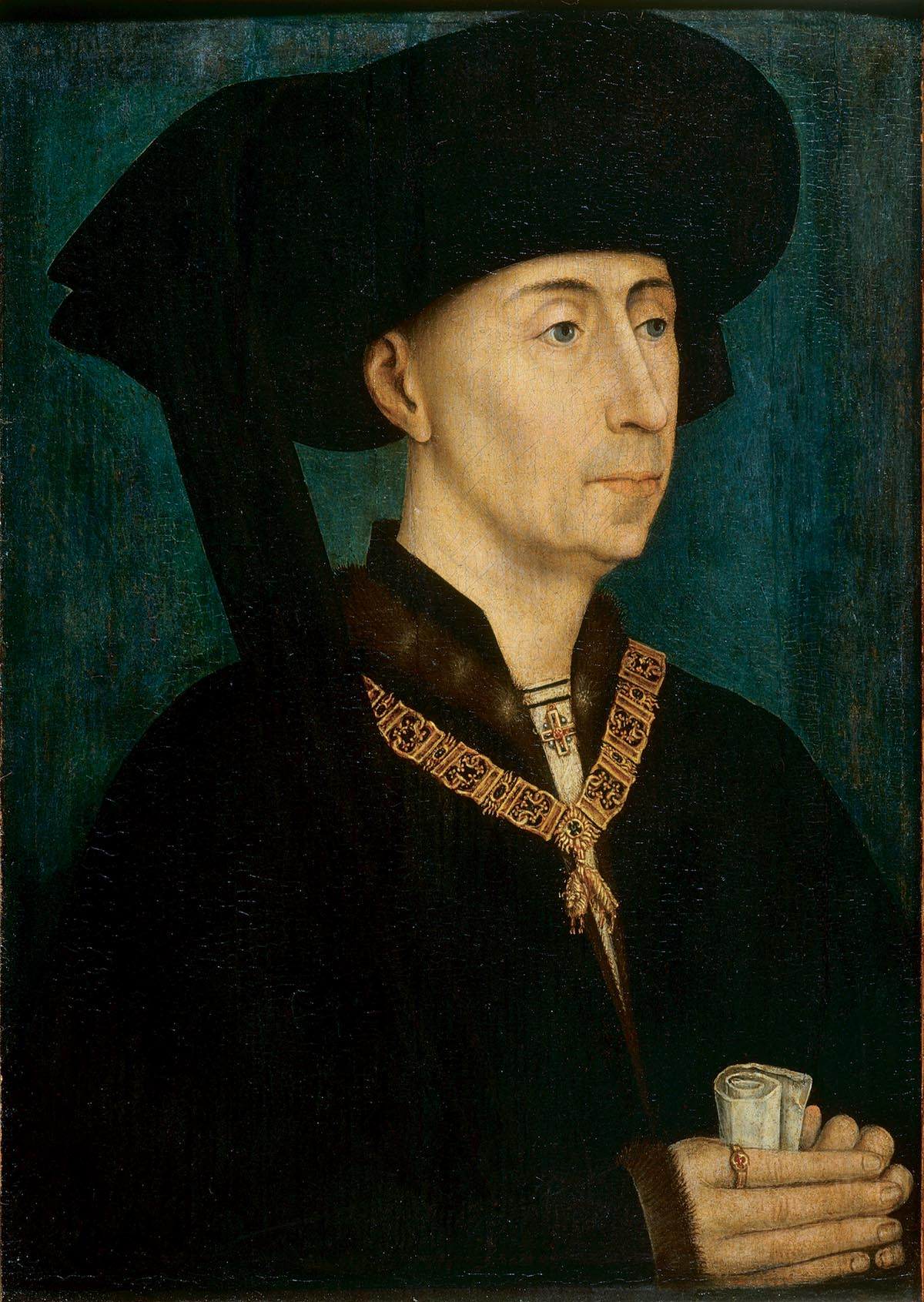
- Philip, wearing the collar of firesteels of the Order of the Golden Fleece which he instituted (copy of a Rogier van der Weyden work of c. 1450)

Duke of Burgundy
- Reign: 10 September 1419 – 15 June 1467
- Predecessor: John the Fearless
- Successor: Charles the Bold
- Born: 31 July 1396; Dijon, Burgundy, France
- Died: 15 June 1467 (aged 70); Bruges, Flanders, Burgundian Netherlands
- Burial: Dijon, Burgundy
- Spouse: Michelle of Valois (m. 1409; died 1422) Bonne of Artois (m. 1424; died 1425) Isabella of Portugal (m. 1430)
- Issue among others: Charles the Bold; Illegitimate: Corneille, bastard of Burgundy; Anthony, bastard of Burgundy; David, Bishop of Therouanne and Utrecht; Anne, Lady of Ravenstein; Raphael de Mercatellis; Philip, Bishop of Utrecht; Baudouin of Burgundy
- House: Valois-Burgundy
- Father: John the Fearless
- Mother: Margaret of Bavaria
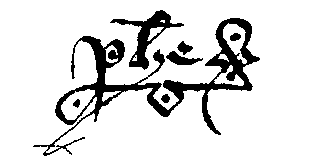
- Signature

Philip III (31 July 1396 – 15 June 1467), also known as Philip the Good (French: Philippe le Bon; Dutch: Filips de Goede), was Duke of Burgundy from 1419 until his death in 1467. He was a member of a cadet line of the House of Valois, to which all 15th-century kings of France belonged. During his reign, the Burgundian State reached the apex of its prosperity and prestige, and became a leading centre of the arts.

Duke Philip has a reputation for his administrative reforms, for his patronage of Flemish artists (such as Jan van Eyck) and of Franco-Flemish composers (such as Binchois), and for the 1430 seizure of Joan of Arc, whom Philip ransomed to the English after his soldiers captured her, resulting in her trial and eventual execution. In political affairs, he alternated between alliances with the English and with the French in an attempt to improve his dynasty's powerbase. Additionally, as ruler of Flanders, Brabant, Limburg, Artois, Hainaut, Holland, Luxembourg, Zeeland, Friesland and Namur, he played an important role in the consolidation of Low Countries; for this Justus Lipsius called him 'Conditor Belgii'.

He married three times and had three legitimate sons, all from his third marriage; only one legitimate son reached adulthood. Philip had 24 documented mistresses and fathered at least 18 illegitimate children.

== Early life ==
Philip of Valois-Burgundy was born on 31 July 1396 in Dijon, Duchy of Burgundy, France as the fourth child and first son of John, Count of Nevers (later Duke of Burgundy known as "John the Fearless"; 1371–1419) and his wife and consort, born Margaret of Bavaria (1363–1424). He was a great-grandson of John II, King of France (1319–1364), and a first cousin once removed of the then-ruling king, Charles VI (1368–1422). His father succeeded Philip's grandfather, Philip II ("Philip the Bold", 1342–1404) as Duke of Burgundy in 1404. On 28 January 1405, at the age of eight, Philip was created Count of Charolais as an appanage and was probably engaged to his second cousin, nine-year-old Michelle of France (1395–1422), daughter of King Charles VI on the same day. They were married in June 1409.

In 1415, when the English forces under King Henry V of England invaded France, his father, the Duke of Burgundy, declared neutrality and forbade him from leaving the Duchy of Burgundy to join the French forces.

== Early rule and alliance with England ==
In 1419, at the age of 24, Philip became Duke of Burgundy (fief of France) and Count of Flanders (France), Artois (France) and Count Palatine of Burgundy (Holy Roman Empire), upon the assassination of John the Fearless, his father. Upon receiving the news, he flung himself onto his bed, thrashing about, grinding his teeth and rolling his eyes, Philip accused Charles, the Dauphin of France and Philip's brother-in-law, of planning the murder, which took place during a meeting between John and Charles at Montereau, and negotiated with the English for alliance mere days after. Because of this, he continued to prosecute the Armagnac–Burgundian Civil War, which in turn became entangled in the larger Hundred Years' War. In 1420, Philip allied himself with Henry V of England under the Treaty of Troyes. In 1423, the marriage of Philip's sister Anne to John, Duke of Bedford, regent for Henry VI of England, strengthened the English alliance.

On 23 May 1430, Philip's troops under the Count of Ligny captured Joan of Arc at Compiègne, and later sold her to the English, who orchestrated a heresy trial against her conducted by pro-Burgundian clerics, after which she was burnt at the stake in 1431. Despite this action against Joan of Arc, Philip's alliance with England was broken in 1435 when he signed the Treaty of Arras, which completely revoked the Treaty of Troyes and recognised Charles VII as King of France. Philip signed the treaty for a variety of reasons, one of which may have been a desire to be recognised as the preeminent duke in France.

This action proved a poor decision in the long term; Charles VII and his successors saw the Burgundian State as a serious impediment to the expansion of royal authority in France, and for this reason they constantly tried to undermine Burgundy, so as to subordinate it to French sovereignty. Philip's defection to the French proved not only catastrophic to the dual monarchy of England and France, but to his own domains as well, subordinating them to a powerful centralised Valois monarchy.

He then attacked Calais, a strategic possession of the English, but the alliance with Charles was broken in 1439. Philip supported the revolt of the French nobles the following year (an event known as the Praguerie) and offered shelter to the Dauphin Louis, who had rebelled against his father Charles VII.

== Geographic expansion ==
Territories of the House of Valois-Burgundy during the reign of Philipp the Good

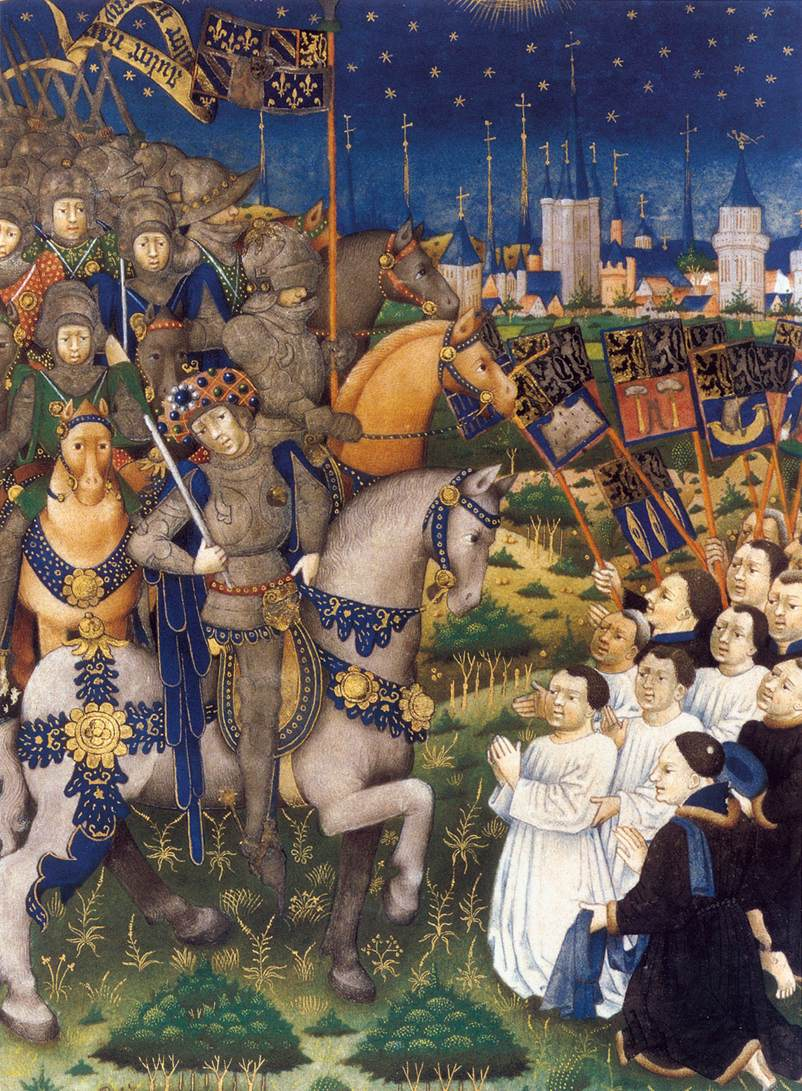
The burghers of Ghent surrender to Philip after the Battle of Gavere. Illustration from a contemporary manuscript.

Philip was generally preoccupied with matters in his own territories and was seldom involved directly in the Hundred Years' War between England and France, although he did play a role during a number of periods, such as the campaign against Compiègne during which his troops captured Joan of Arc. In 1429, he incorporated Namur into Burgundian territory (by purchase, from John III, Marquis of Namur) and Hainault and Holland, Friesland and Zeeland in 1432 with the defeat of Jacqueline, Countess of Hainault, in the last episode of the Hook and Cod wars. He inherited the Duchies of Brabant and Limburg and the Margraviate of Antwerp in 1430 on the death of his cousin Philip of Saint-Pol and purchased Luxembourg in 1443 from Elisabeth of Bohemia, Duchess of Luxembourg.

In 1456, Philip also managed to ensure his illegitimate son David was elected Bishop of Utrecht and his nephew Louis de Bourbon elected Prince-Bishop of Liège. It is not surprising that in 1435 Philip began to style himself the "Grand Duke of the West".

In 1463, Philip gave up some of his territory to King Louis XI of France. That year he also created an Estates-General for the Netherlands based on the French model. The first meeting of the Estates-General was to obtain a loan for a war against France and to ensure support for the succession of his son Charles I to his now vast dominions.

In 1465 and 1467, Philip crushed two rebellions in Liège before dying a few weeks later in Bruges after the latter insurrection.

== Court life and patron of the arts ==
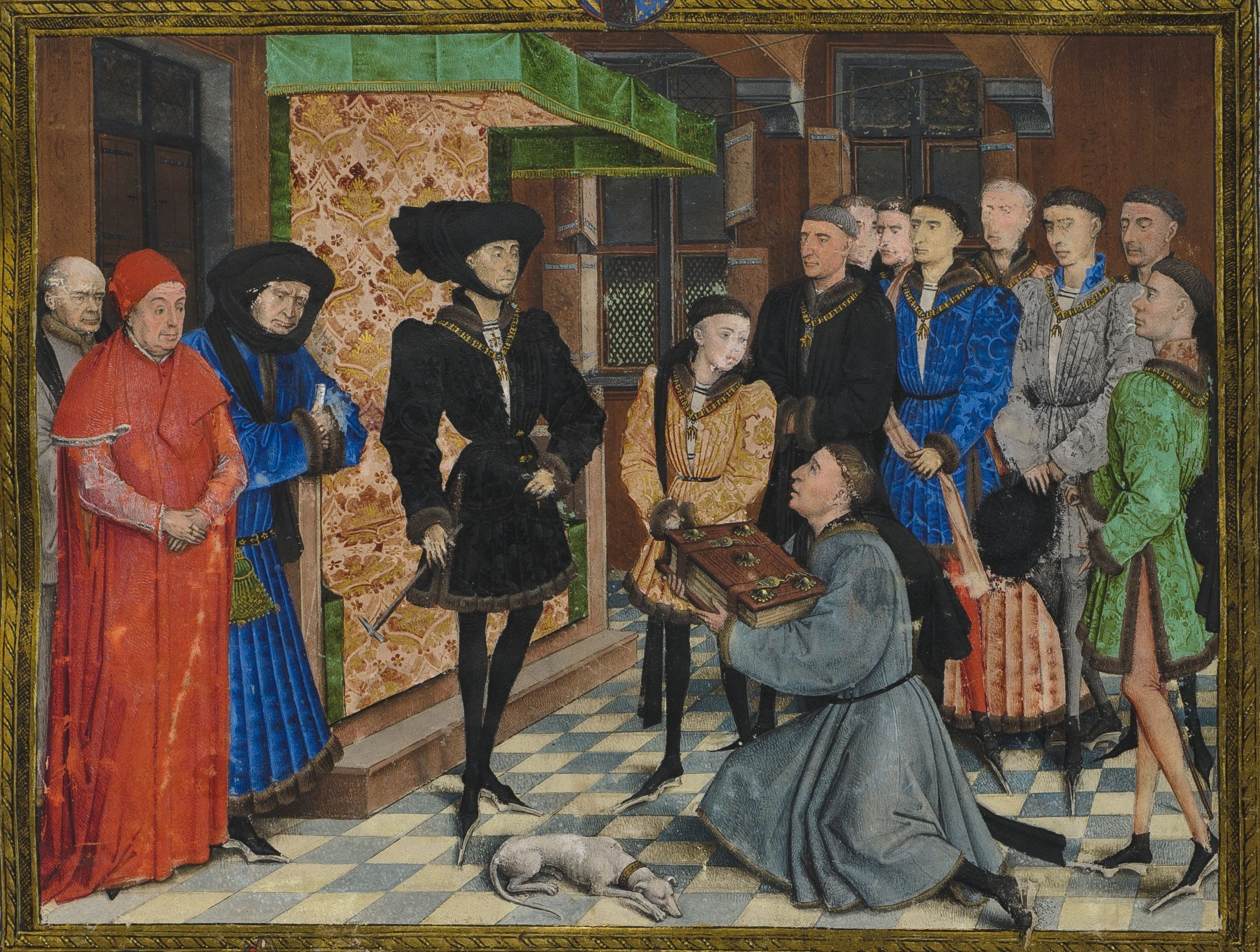
Rogier van der Weyden miniature 1447–48. Philip dresses his best, in an extravagant chaperon, to be presented with a History of Hainault by the author, Jean Wauquelin, flanked by his son Charles and his chancellor Nicolas Rolin.

Philip's court can only be described as extravagant. Despite the flourishing bourgeois culture of Burgundy, with which the ducal court kept in close touch, he and the aristocrats who formed most of his inner circle retained a world-view dominated by the ideas and traditions of chivalry. He declined membership in the Order of the Garter in 1422, which would have been considered an act of treason against the king of France, his feudal overlord. Instead, he created his own Order of the Golden Fleece, based on the Knights of the Round Table and the myth of Jason, in 1430. In time his order would become the most prestigious and historic of all knightly orders of chivalry in all of Europe.

Philip had no fixed capital (seat of government) and moved the court between various palaces, the main urban ones being in Brussels, Bruges, and Lille. He held grand feasts and other festivities, and the knights of his Order frequently travelled throughout his territory to participate in tournaments. In 1454, Philip planned a crusade against the Ottoman Empire, launching it at the Feast of the Pheasant, but this plan never materialized. In a period from 1444 to 1446, he is estimated to have spent a sum equivalent to 2% of Burgundy's main income in the recette génerale, with a single Italian supplier of silk and cloth of gold, Giovanni di Arrigo Arnolfini.

Philip's court was regarded as the most splendid in Europe by his contemporaries, and it became the accepted leader of taste and fashion, which probably helped the Burgundian economy considerably, as Burgundian (usually Flemish) luxury products became sought by the elites across Europe. During his reign, for example, the richest English commissioners of illuminated manuscripts moved away from English and Parisian products to those of the Netherlands, as did other foreign buyers. Philip himself is estimated to have added six hundred manuscripts to the ducal collection, making him by a considerable margin the most important literary patron of the period. Jean Miélot, one of his secretaries, translated into French such works as Giovanni Boccaccio's Genealogia Deorum Gentilium which is good example of the sophistication of Philip's court.

Philip was a considerable patron of the visual arts. He commissioned many tapestries (which he tended to prefer over oil paintings), pieces from goldsmiths, jewellery, and other works of art, including numerous mechanical automata and fountains at the Chauteau of Hesdin. It was also during his reign that the Burgundian chapel became the musical centre of Europe, with the activity of the Burgundian School of composers and singers. Esteemed composers such as Gilles Binchois, Robert Morton, and later Guillaume Dufay were all part of Philip's court chapel.

In 1428, van Eyck travelled to Portugal to paint a portrait of the daughter of King John I, the Infanta Isabella, personally for Philip in advance of their marriage. With help from more experienced Portuguese shipbuilders, Philip established a shipyard in Bruges, which helped commerce flourish. Rogier van der Weyden painted his portrait twice on panel. Only copies survive, but in each he is shown wearing the collar of the Order of the Golden Fleece. The only extant original van der Weyden of Philip is a superb miniature known as "Jean Wauquelin presenting his 'Chroniques de Hainaut' to Philip the Good". The painter Hugo van der Goes of the Early Netherlandish school is credited with paintings for the church where Philip's funeral was held.

== Family and issue ==
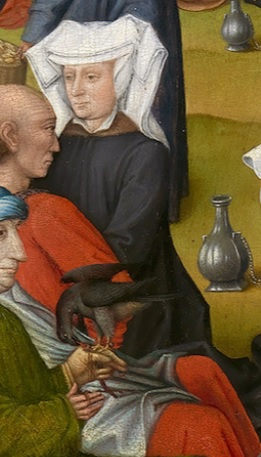
Michelle of Valois by Rogier van der Weyden.

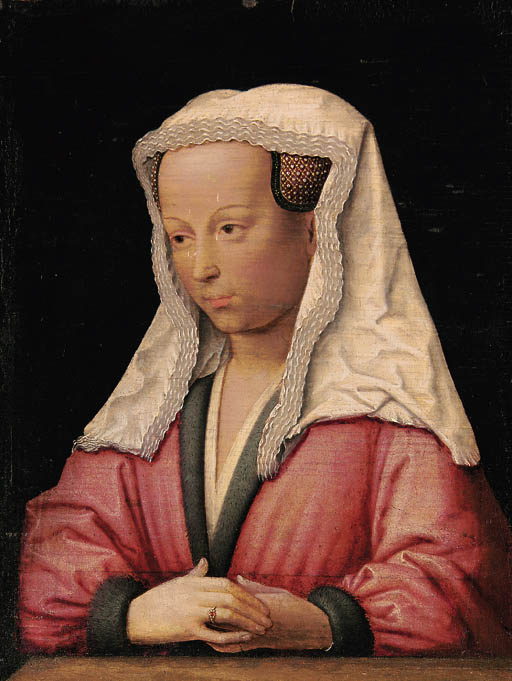
Bonne of Artois.

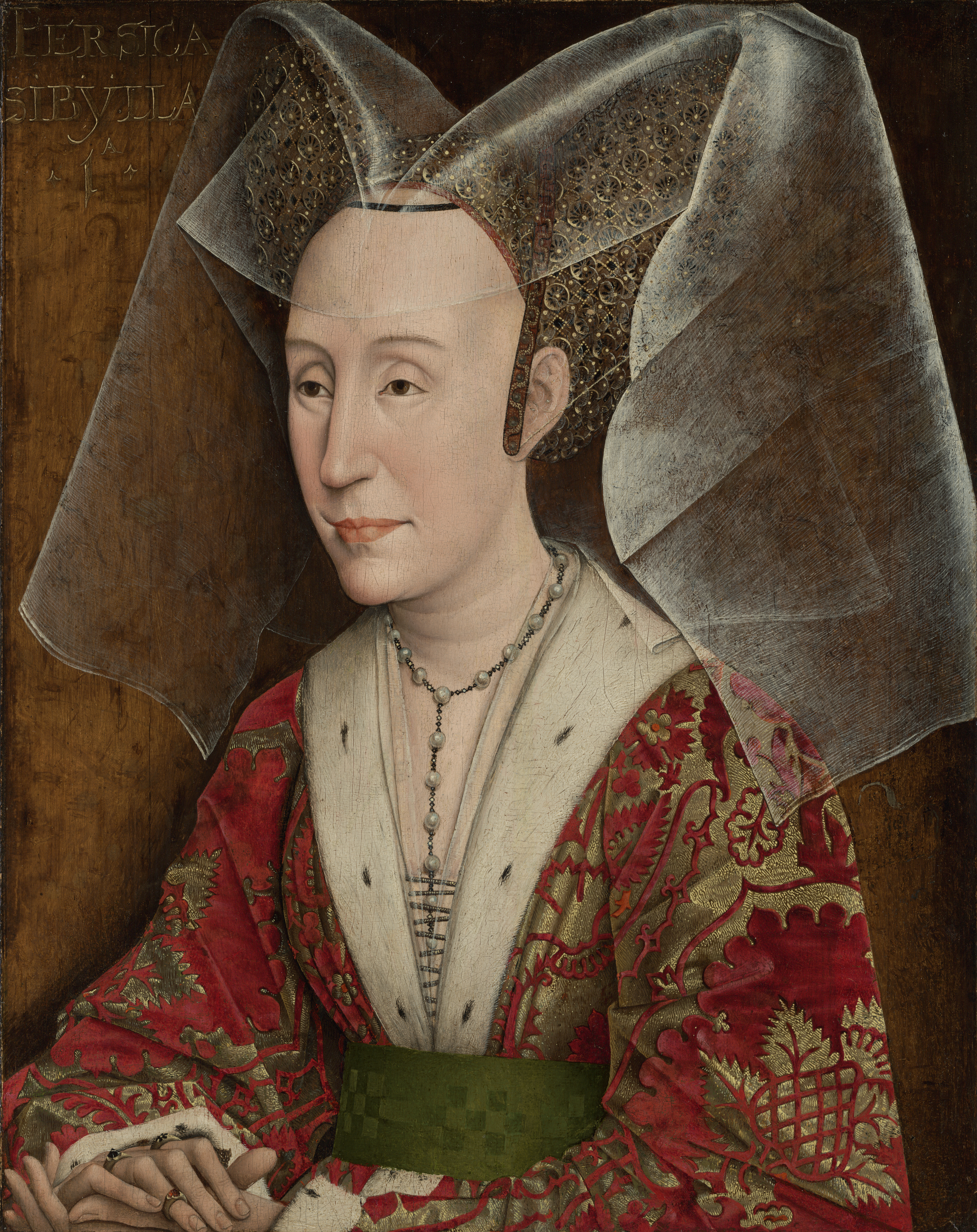
Portrait of Isabella of Portugal from the workshop of Rogier van der Weyden, c. 1445–1450

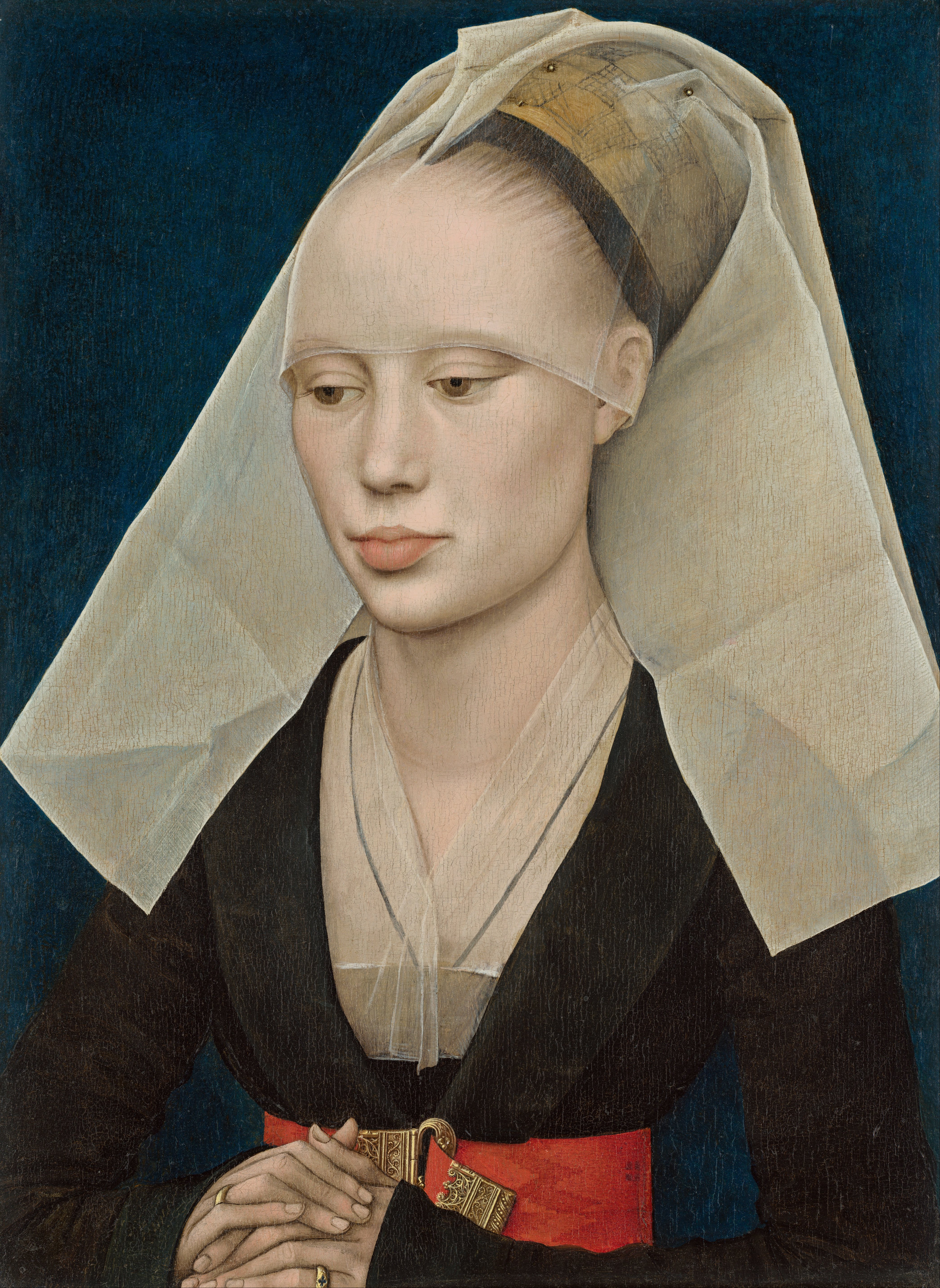
Possible Portrait of Marie de Valengin an illegitimate daughter of Phillip The Good by Rogier van der Weyden, 1460.

=== Marriages and legitimate children ===
Philip married his second cousin Michelle of France (1395–1422) in June 1409, when he was 12 and she was 14. She was a daughter of Charles VI, King of France (1368–1422) and his wife and consort, Isabeau of Bavaria (c. 1370–1435). They had one daughter, Agnes, who died in infancy, and Michelle died on 8 July 1422. On 30 November 1424 in Moulins-Engelbert, Philip married the widow of his late paternal uncle, Philip II, Count of Nevers (1389–1415), Bonne of Artois (1396 – 17 September 1425). She was the daughter of Philip of Artois, Count of Eu (1358–1397) and his wife, Marie of Berry, suo jure Duchess of Auvergne (c. 1375–1434). Bonne died within a year of the wedding, and the couple had no children, leaving Philip with no legitimate sons to this point.

On 7 January 1430 in Bruges, Philip married his third wife, Infanta Isabella of Portugal (21 February 1397 – 17 December 1471), daughter of John I, King of Portugal (1357–1433) and his wife, Philippa of Lancaster (1360–1415) after a proxy marriage the year before. This marriage produced three sons, only one of whom reached adulthood:

- Anthony of Burgundy (30 September 1430, Brussels – 5 February 1432, Brussels), Count of Charolais;
- Josse of Burgundy (24 April 1432 – in 1432, after 6 May), Count of Charolais;
- Charles of Burgundy (10 November 1433, Dijon – 5 January 1477, Nancy), Philip's successor, known as "Charles the Bold".

=== Mistresses and illegitimate children ===
Philip had 24 documented mistresses and fathered at least 18 illegitimate children.

- From Catharina Schaers:
  - Cornille, bastard of Burgundy (circa 1420 – 16 June 1452, Rupelmonde), Lord of Beveren, known as "le Grand Bâtard de Bourgogne" (the Great Bastard of Burgundy), Governor-general of Luxembourg, who died in the Battle of Bazel. He did not marry but had illegitimate issue;
- From Jeanne de Presles (circa 1400 – circa 1440), daughter of Louis or Raoul de Presles:
  - Anthony, bastard of Burgundy (circa 1421 – 5 May 1504), Count of La Roche, Lord of Beveren and known as "le Grand Bâtard de Bourgogne" after the death of his older half-brother, who married Jeanne-Marie de La Vieville/Viesville (born circa 1430) and had both legitimate and illegitimate issue, becoming founder of the Burgundy-Beveren branch of the family;
- From Jeanne/Colette Catelaine/Chastellain, also known as Jeanne/Colette de Bosquiel, demoiselle of Quiéry-la-Motte (died 1462), who married Étienne de Bours, also known as Mailltoin (died 1450), governor of Gorgues and Dunkirk:
  - Mary of Burgundy (circa 1426 – 1462), who married Pierre de Bauffremont, Count of Charny (circa 1397 – 1473) in 1447 and had issue;
- From Nicoletta de Bosquiel:
  - David, bastard of Burgundy, Prince-Bishop of Utrecht (circa 1427 – 16 April 1496)
- From Jacqueline van Steenbergen/Steenberghe:
  - Anne, bastard of Burgundy (circa 1435 – January 1508, Souburg Castle), governess of her niece, Mary, suo jure Duchess of Burgundy ("Mary the Rich; 1457–1482), daughter of her legitimate half-brother Charles; married first Adriaan van Borselen, Lord of Brigdamme (circa 1417 – 1468) then her paternal cousin Adolph of Cleves, Lord of Ravenstein (1425–1492) and had issue;
- From the wife of a Venetian merchant of the Mercatellis family in Bruges:
  - Raphael of Burgundy, (circa 1437 – 3 August 1508), abbot of Saint Bavo's Abbey in Ghent, titular bishop of Rhosus and bibliophile;
- From Catharina de Tiesferies (born circa 1425):
  - Baudouin of Burgundy, Lord of Falais (1445, Rijssen – May 1508, Brussels)
- From Margaretha Post:
  - Philip, bastard of Burgundy, Prince-Bishop of Utrecht, Admiral of the Netherlands (1464 – 7 April 1524, Wijk bij Duurstede)
- From Isabella de la Vigne:
  - Margaret, bastard of Burgundy (died 1455)
- From Marguerite Scupelins:
  - Jean, bastard of Burgundy (died 25 January 1499, Brussels), provost in Bruges, papal notary, had illegitimate issue;
- From Célie:
  - Marion, bastard of Burgundy
- From unknown mothers:
  - Barbe de Steenbourg, abbess in Bourbourg
  - Corneille (died circa 1428)
  - Cornelia, bastard of Burgundy, married André de Toulongeon, Lord of Mornay and Saint-Aubin (died 1432, Palestine)
  - Catherine, bastard of Burgundy, married Humbert de Luyrieux, Lord of La Quelle on 28 June 1460 and had issue
  - Cateline, bastard of Burgundy, an abbess in Ghent (died after 1515)
  - Arthur, died young and had no issue
  - Catherine, a nun
  - Jossine, died young
  - Philippe, bastard of Burgundy, died young
  - Madeleine/Magdalena, bastard of Burgundy
  - Marie, a nun
  - Yolande, bastard of Burgundy (died 3 November 1470), who married Jean d'Ailly, Vidame of Amiens in 1456

== Honours ==
- Burgundian State: 1st Grand Master and Knight of the Order of the Golden Fleece
- Kingdom of France – Duchy of Orléans: Knight of the Order of the Porcupine

=== Refused honours ===
- Kingdom of England: Order of the Garter

== Sources ==
- Blockmans, W.; Prevenier, W. [in Dutch] (1999). Edward Peters (ed.). The Promised Lands: The Low Countries Under Burgundian Rule, 1369–1530. Translated by Elizabeth Fackelman. University of Pennsylvania Press. ISBN 978-0-8122-1382-9.
- Campbell, Lorne (1998). National Gallery Catalogues: The Fifteenth Century Netherlandish Schools. National Gallery company. ISBN 978-1-85709-171-7.
- Damen, Mario; Brown-Grant, Rosalind, eds. (2022). A Chivalric Life: The Book of the Deeds of Messire Jacques de Lalaing. The Boydell Press.
- Gillespie, Alexander (24 August 2017). The Causes of War, Volume 3: 1400 CE to 1650 CE. Hart Publishing. ISBN 978-1-84946-646-2.
- Kren, Thomas; McKendrick, Scot, eds. (2003). Illuminating the Renaissance: The Triumph of Flemish Manuscript Painting in Europe. J. Paul Getty Museum; Royal Academy of Arts. ISBN 978-1-903973-28-8.
- Lobanov, Aleksandr. "The Indenture of Philip the Good, Duke of Burgundy, of 12 February 1430 and the Lancastrian Kingdom of France". The English Historical Review, volume 130, no. 543, April 2015. JSTOR 24474402
- Putnam, Ruth (1908). Charles the Bold, last Duke of Burgundy, 1433–1477. G. P. Putnam's Sons. LCCN 08006627. OCLC 671311.
- Vale, M.G.A. (1 October 1974). Charles VII. University of California Press. ISBN 978-0-520-02787-9.
- Vaughan, Richard (2004). Philip the Good: The Apogee of Burgundy. Boydell Press. ISBN 978-0-85115-917-1.
- Vaughan, Richard (2005). John the Fearless: The Growth of Burgundian Power. Boydell Press. ISBN 978-0-85115-916-4.

Philip the Good House of Valois-Burgundy Cadet branch of the House of Valois Born: 31 July 1396 Died: 15 June 1467
Regnal titles
Preceded by John the Fearless	Duke of Burgundy; Count of Artois and Flanders; Count Palatine of Burgundy; 1419–1467	Succeeded by Charles the Bold
Preceded by John the Fearless	Count of Charolais; 1405–1433	Succeeded by Charles the Bold
Preceded by John III	Margrave of Namur; 1429–1467	Succeeded by Charles the Bold
Preceded by Philip I	Duke of Brabant, Limburg and Lothier; 1430–1467	Succeeded by Charles the Bold
Preceded by Jacqueline	Count of Hainaut, Holland and Zeeland; 1432–1467	Succeeded by Charles the Bold
Preceded by Elisabeth	Duke of Luxemburg; 1443–1467	Succeeded by Charles the Bold
