= Jan Gossaert =

Flemish painter (1478–1532)

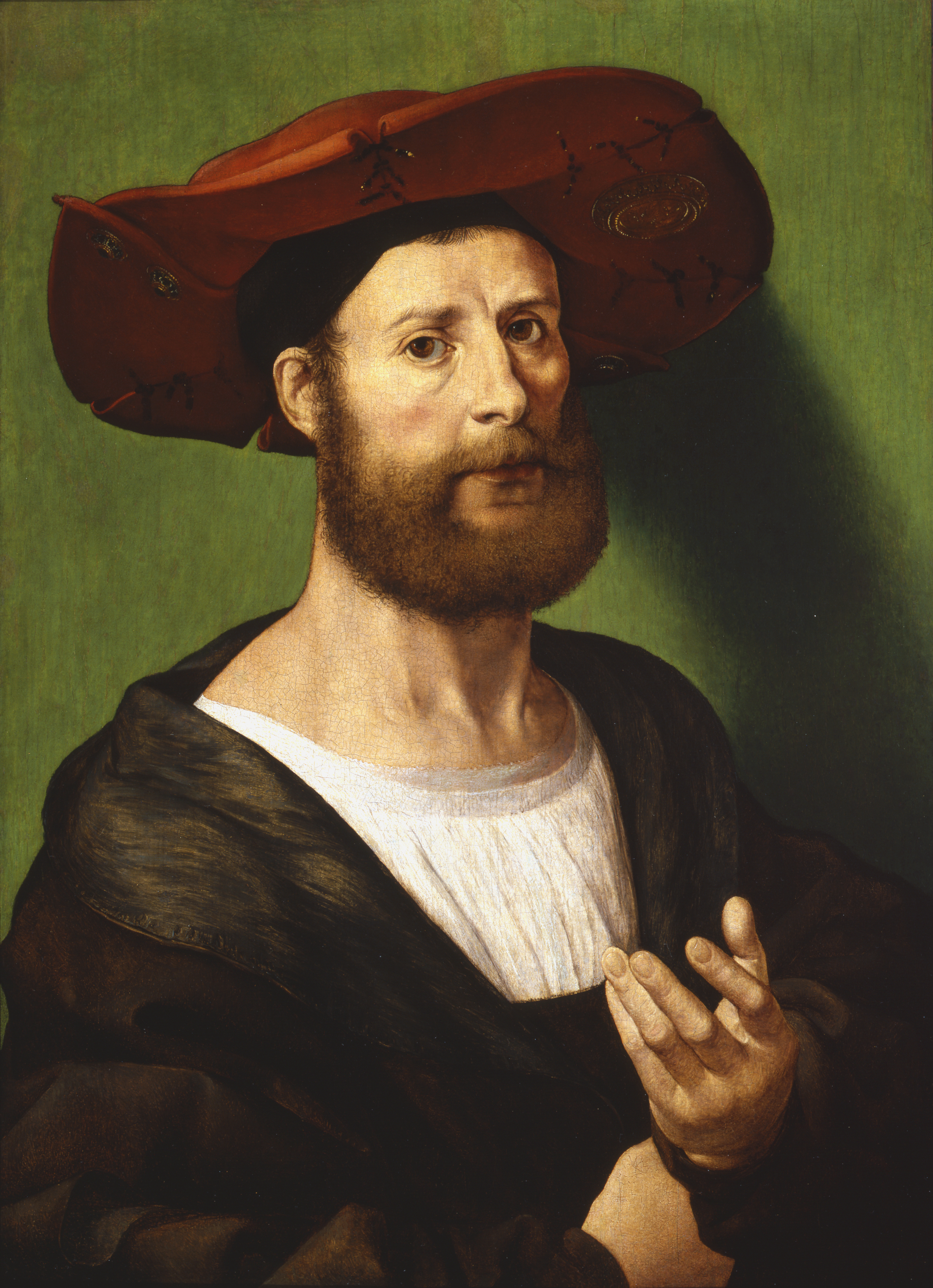
Self portrait, 1515–1520, Currier Museum of Art

Jan Gossaert (c. 1478 – 1 October 1532) was a French-speaking painter from the Low Countries also known as Jan Mabuse (the name he adopted from his birthplace, Maubeuge) or Jennyn van Hennegouwe (Hainaut), as he called himself when he matriculated in the Guild of Saint Luke, at Antwerp, in 1503. He was one of the first painters of Dutch and Flemish Renaissance painting to visit Italy and Rome, which he did in 1508–09, and a leader of the style known as Romanism, which brought elements of Italian Renaissance painting to the north, sometimes with a rather awkward effect. He achieved fame across at least northern Europe, and painted religious subjects, including large altarpieces, portraits and mythological subjects.

From at least 1508 he was apparently continuously employed, or at least retained, by quasi-royal patrons, mostly members of the extended Habsburg family, heirs to the Valois Duchy of Burgundy. These were Philip of Burgundy, Adolf of Burgundy, Christian II of Denmark when in exile, and Mencía de Mendoza, Countess of Nassau, third wife of Henry III of Nassau-Breda.

A contemporary of Albrecht Dürer and the younger Lucas van Leyden, whom he knew, he was less highly regarded in modern times than they were. As he was not a printmaker like these two artists, his works and fame did not spread as widely as theirs. His surviving drawings are excellent and are preferred by some to his paintings.

== Biography ==
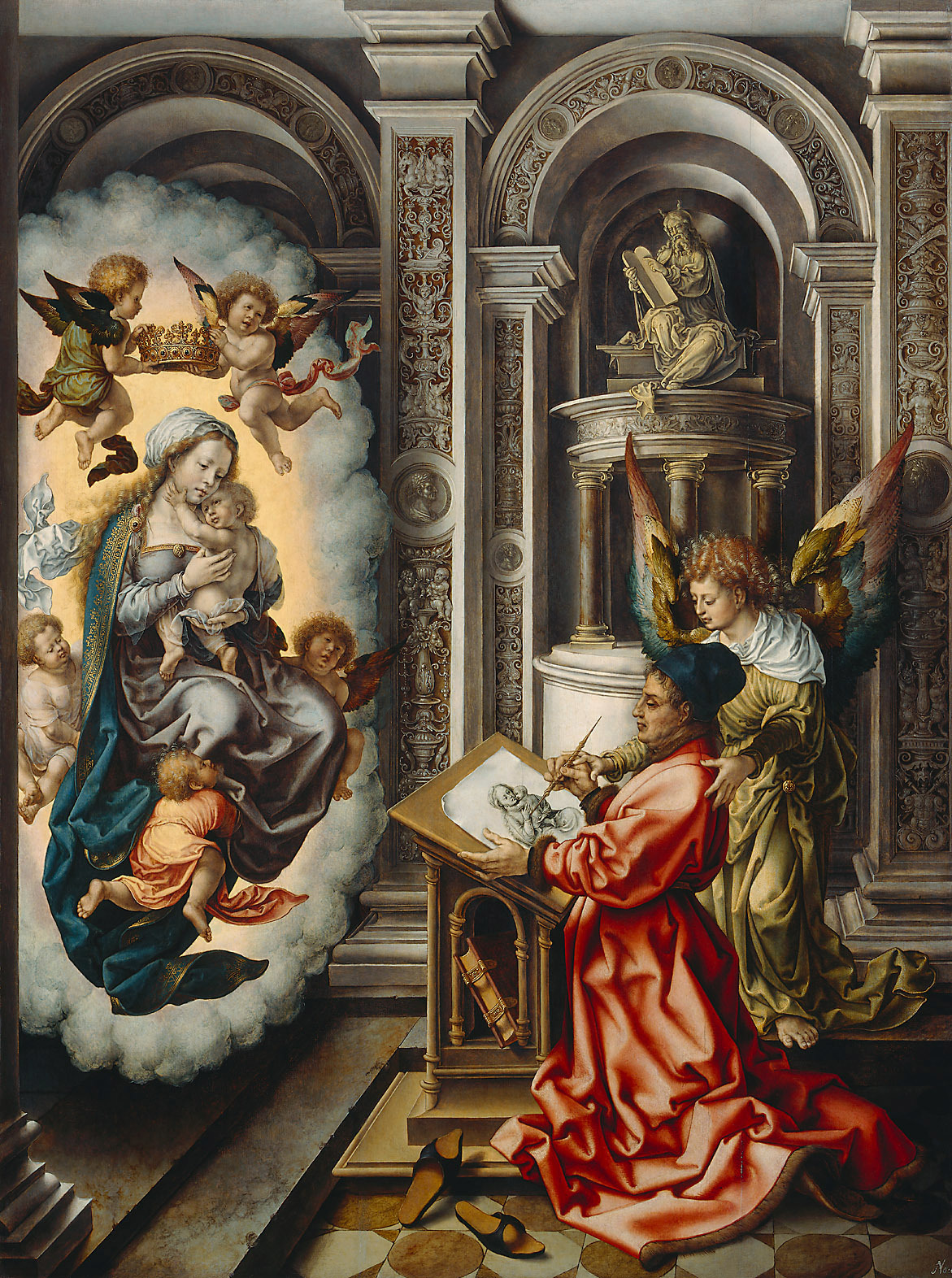
St Luke Painting the Madonna (1520–25) Wood, 109.5 × 82 cm Kunsthistorisches Museum, Vienna

His name was in fact "Jan Gossart", and he was so known in his lifetime; the Dutch version "Gossaert" crept into later sources, despite Gossart's first language being French. Little is known of his early life. One of his earliest biographers, Karel van Mander, claimed he was from a small town in Artois or Henegouwen (County of Hainaut) called Maubeuge or Maubuse. Other scholars have determined he was the son of a bookbinder who received his training at Maubeuge Abbey, while the RKD mentions there is evidence to support a claim that he was born in Duurstede Castle. He is registered in the Antwerp Guild of Saint Luke in 1503.

In 1508-9 he travelled to Rome, either in the company of, or later sent by, Philip of Burgundy, an illegitimate son of Duke Philip the Good, who was sent as ambassador to Pope Julius II by Philip the Handsome. Philip's party, very likely including Gossaert, left the Netherlands in October 1508, arrived in Rome on 14 January 1509, and was back at The Hague by 28 June 1509. Although the details are unclear, it seems that Gossaert remained in Philip's employment until he died in 1524, by then Bishop of Utrecht. However, throughout this time he was able to work for other patrons, mostly friends of Philip.

In 1509–17 Gossaert was registered as a resident of Middelburg. According to Van Mander he was one of the first Flemish artists to bring back the Italian manner of painting with much nudity in historical allegories. From 1517 to 1524 he is registered at Duurstede Castle where according to the RKD, he had Jan van Scorel as pupil. From 1524 onwards he returned to Middelburg as court painter to Adolf of Burgundy, another Habsburg relative. Jan Mertens the Younger was another pupil.

He was a contemporary of Lucas van Leyden, and was influenced by artists who came before him, such as Rogier van der Weyden, the great master of Tournai and Brussels and, like him, his compositions were usually framed in architectural backgrounds.

== Works ==
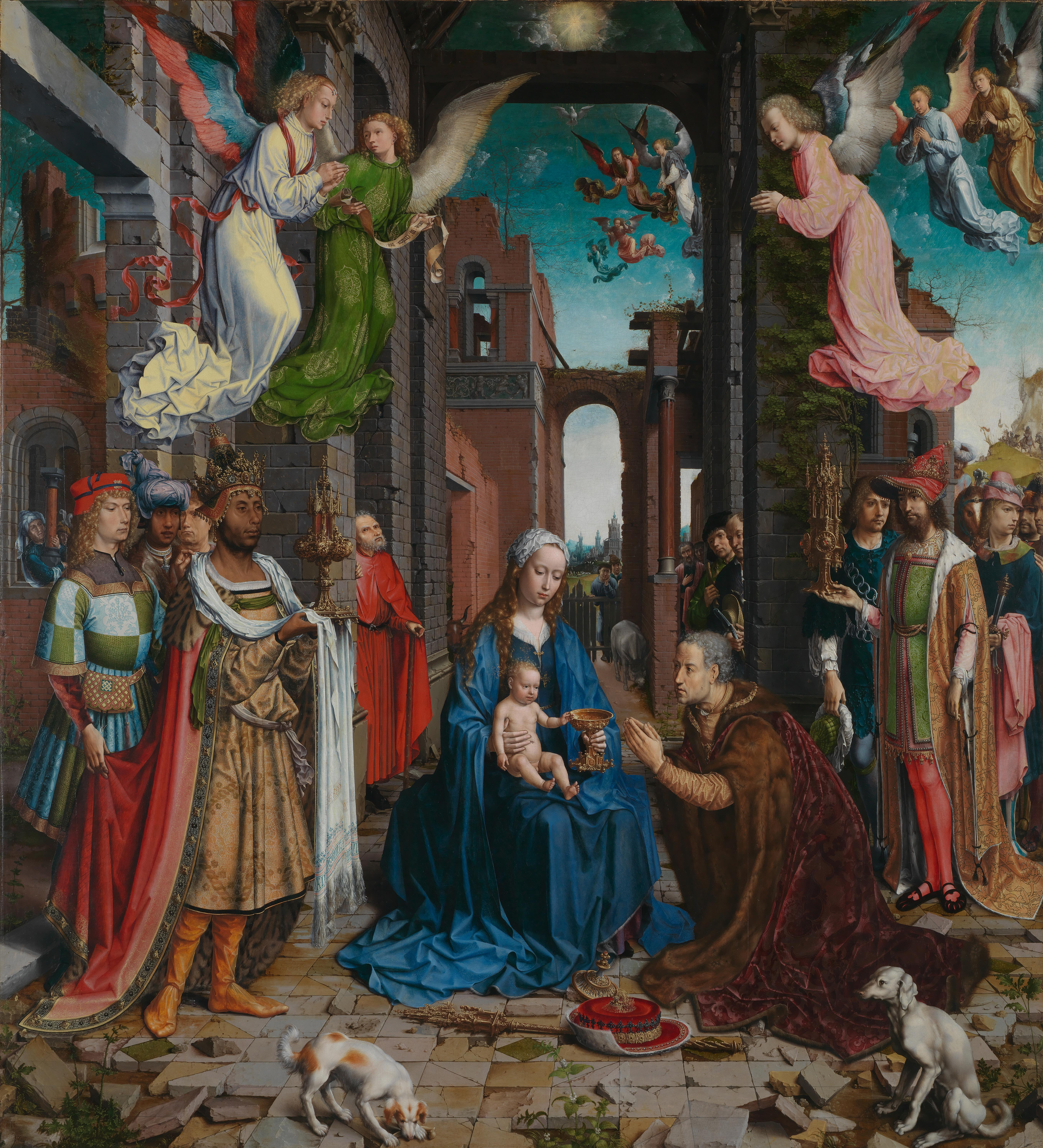
The Adoration of the Kings, formerly at Castle Howard, now at the National Gallery

Gossaert's large altar-pieces previously located at Castle Howard and Scawby show the influence of the Antwerp school. At Scawby he illustrates the legend of the count of Toulouse, who parted with his worldly goods to assume the frock of a hermit. His altarpiece of the Descent from the Cross with heavy double doors in Middelburg was admired by Albrecht Dürer before the church itself was hit by lightning. This is possibly the work now in the Hermitage, though Van Mander stated the lightning destroyed it and describes another Descent of the Cross in the possession of Mr. Magnus of Delft in 1604.

At Castle Howard, the Earl of Carlisle had obtained The Adoration of the Kings previously created for the Grandmontines, which throws together some thirty figures on an architectural background, varied in detail, massive in shape and fanciful in ornament. This painting is now on display at the National Gallery, which bought it in 1911. Gossaert surprises the viewer with pompous costume and flaring contrasts of tone. His figures, like pieces on a chess-board, are often rigid and conventional. The landscape which shows through the colonnades is adorned with towers and steeples in the minute fashion of Van der Weyden. After a residence of a few years at Antwerp, Gossaert took service with Philip of Burgundy, bastard of Philip the Good, at that time lord of Somerdyk and admiral of Zeeland. One of his pictures had already become celebrated: a Descent from the Cross (50 figures), on the high altar of Tongerlo Abbey.

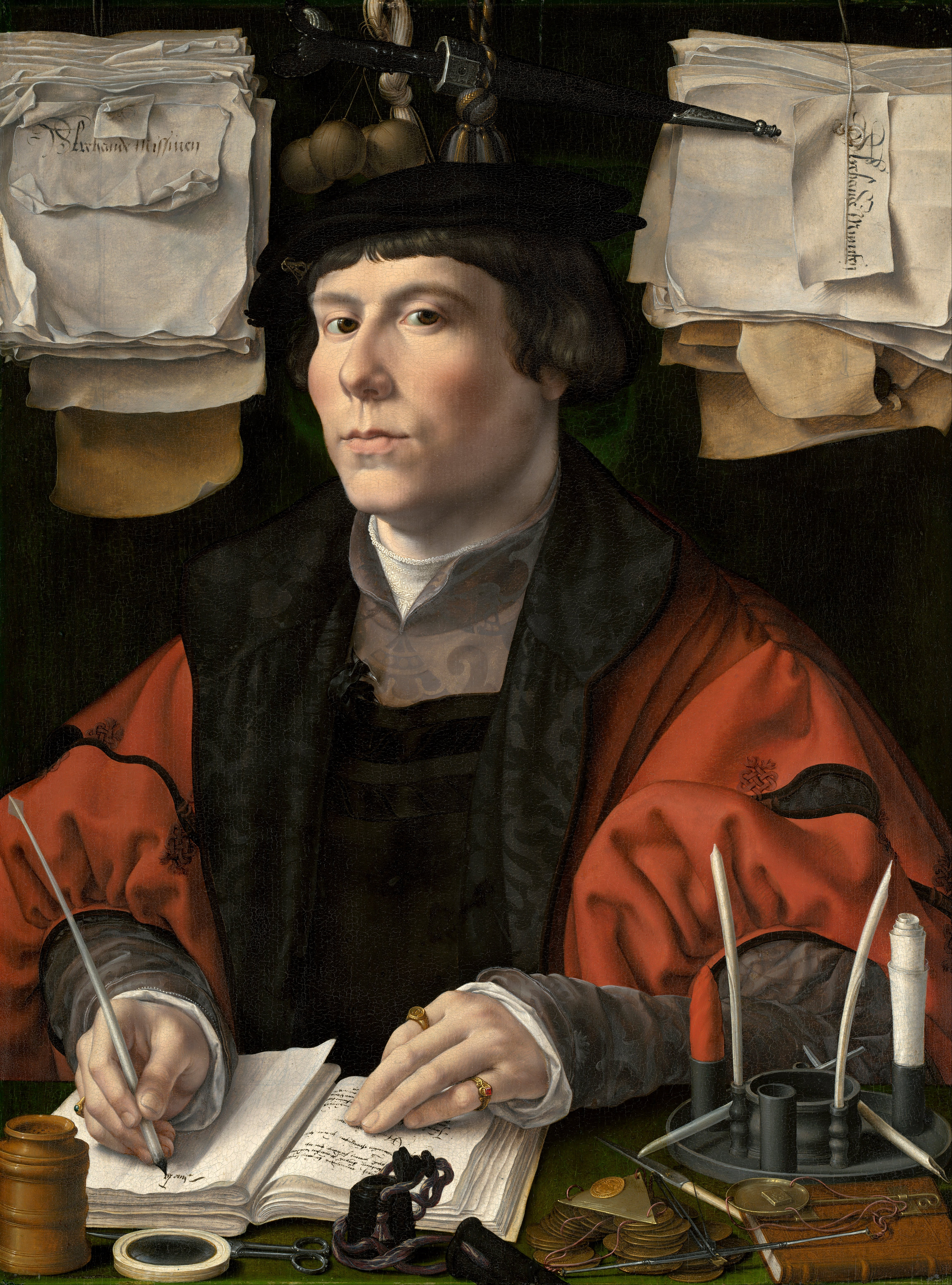
Portrait of a Merchant, c. 1530

Philip of Burgundy ordered Gossaert to execute a replica for the church of Middelburg, and the value which was then set on the picture is apparent from the fact that Dürer came expressly to Middelburg (1521) to see it. In 1568 the altarpiece perished by fire. In 1508 Gossaert accompanied Philip of Burgundy on his Italian mission to the pope, and by this accident an important revolution was effected in the art of the Netherlands. Gossaert appears to have chiefly studied in Italy the cold and polished works of the Leonardesques. He not only brought home a new style, but he also introduced the fashion of travelling to Italy; and from that time until the age of Rubens and Van Dyck it was considered proper that all Flemish painters should visit the peninsula. The Flemings grafted Italian mannerisms on their own stock, and the cross turned out so unfortunately that for a century Flemish art lost all trace of originality.

Gossaert undoubtedly made a large number of drawings in Rome after the innumerable ancient ruins and sculptures that the city had. Today only four surviving magazines are known; a sheet with the ruins of the Colosseum (Berlin, Kupferstichkabinett), a study of the so-called Apollo Kitharoedos (Venice, Accademia), a study of the so-called Capitolean Hercules (Private collection, London), and a sheet with studies of, among others, the famous Spinario or "thorn extractor" (Leiden, Leiden University Library's Print Room).

In the summer of 1509 Philip returned to the Netherlands, and, retiring to his seat of Suytburg in Zeeland, surrendered himself to the pleasures of planning decorations for his castle and ordering pictures of Gossaert and Jacopo de' Barbari. Being in constant communication with the court of Margaret of Austria at Mechelen, he gave the artists in his employ fair chances of promotion. Barbari was made court painter to the regent, while Gossaert received less important commissions. Records prove that Gossaert painted a (posthumous) portrait of Eleanor of Portugal, and other small pieces, for Charles V in 1516.

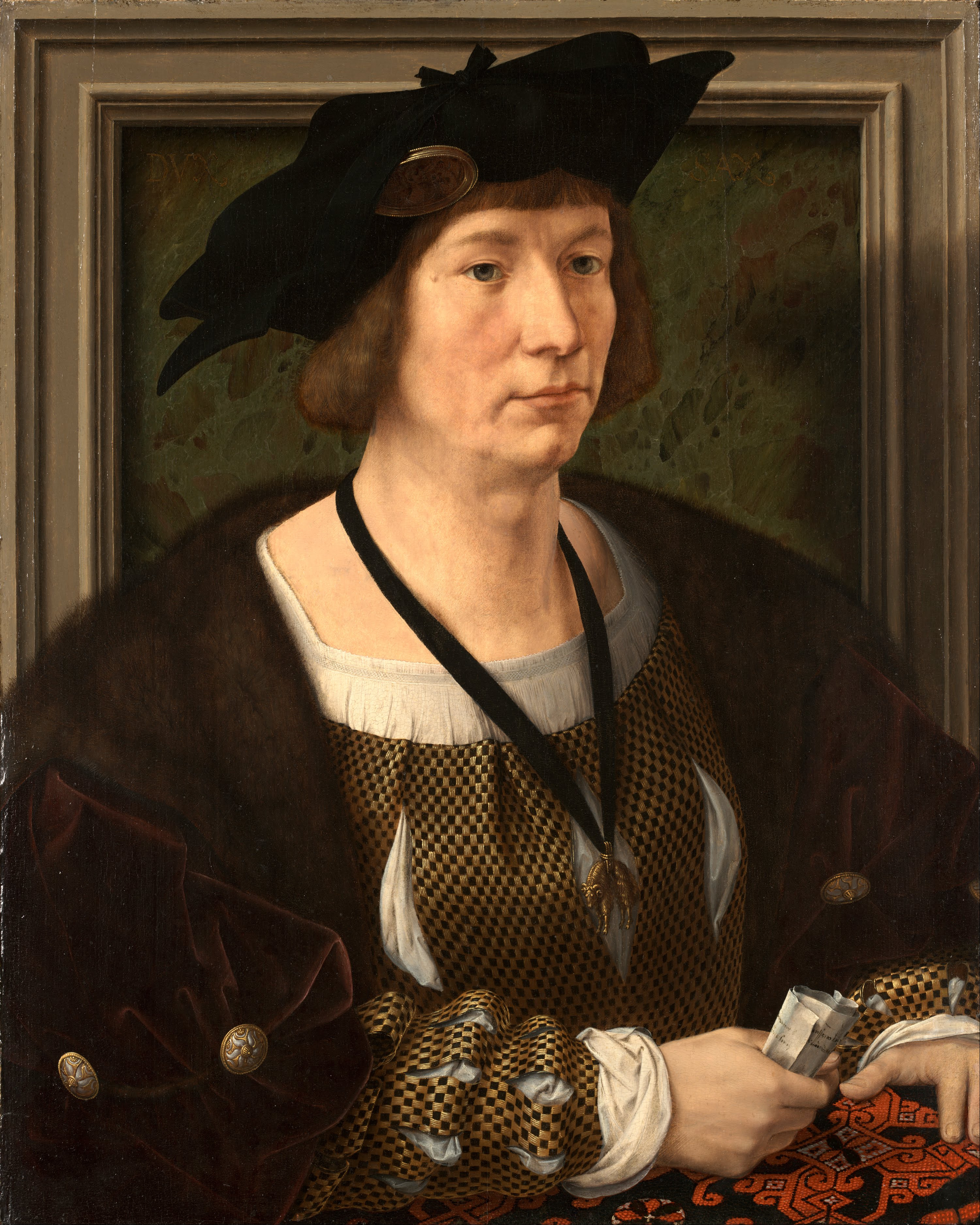
Portrait of Hendrik III, Count of Nassau-Breda

But his only signed pictures of this period are the Neptune and Amphitrite of 1516 at Berlin, and the Madonna, with a portrait of Jean Carondelet of 1517, at the Louvre, both of which suggest that Vasari only spoke by hearsay of the progress made by Gossaert in the true method of producing pictures full of mythological nude figures and poesies. It is difficult to find anything more coarse or misshapen than the Amphitrite, unless it is the grotesque and ungainly drayman who figures for Neptune. In later forms of the same subject—the Adam and Eve at Hampton Court, or its feebler replica at Berlin and Venus and Amor (Royal Museums of Fine Arts of Belgium, Brussels)—there is more nudity, combined with realism of the commonest type.

Gossaert was changed by his travelling. His figures still retained the character of stone, his architecture remained varied, his tones remained strong, but his bright tints were replaced by greys; and he used the sfumato of the Milanese on his surfaces. These changes can be seen in his Madonnas of Munich and Vienna (1527), the likeness of a girl weighing gold pieces (Berlin), and the portraits of the children of the king of Denmark at Hampton Court, are fair specimens of his skill.

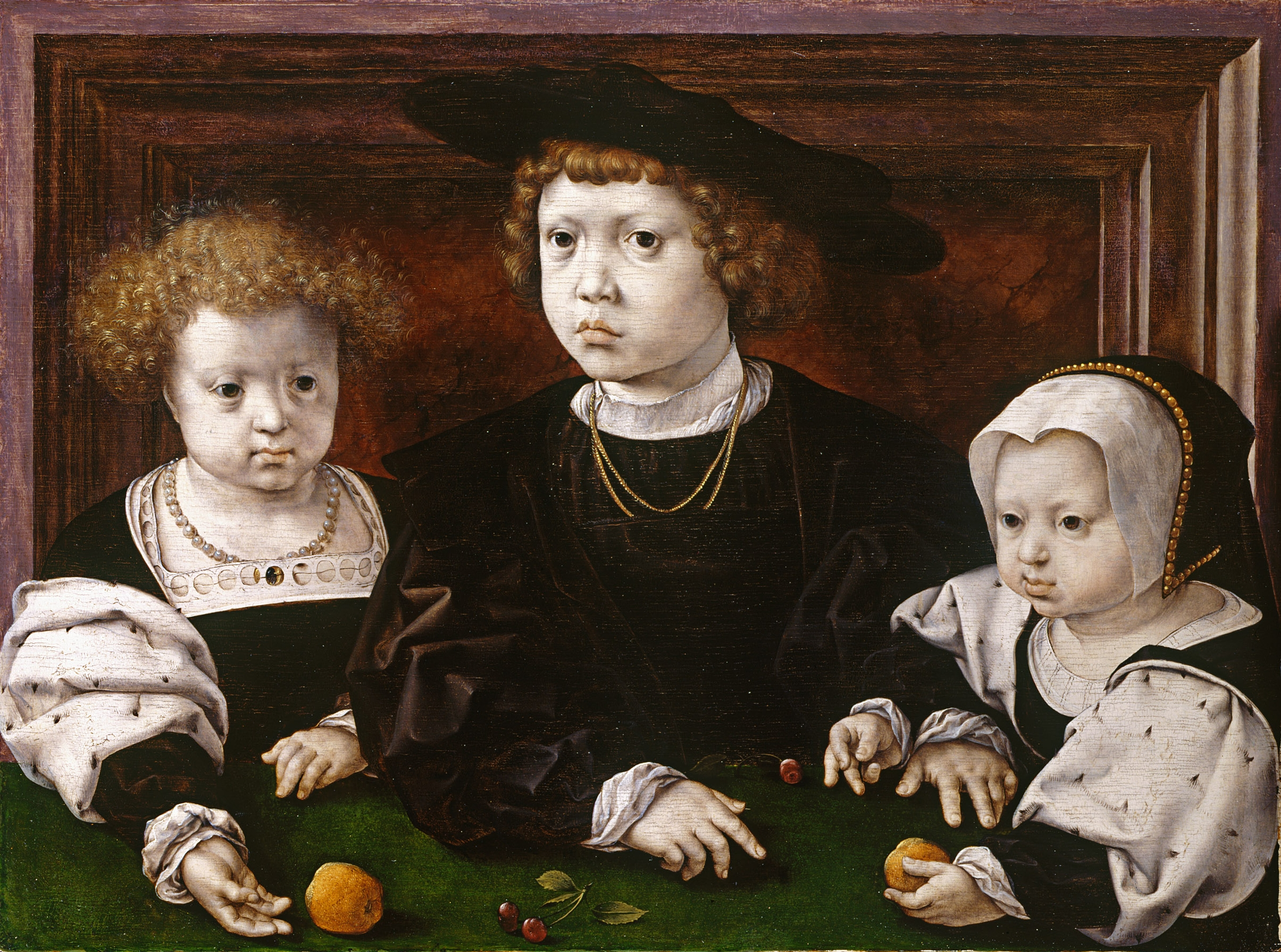
Three children of Christian II of Denmark 1526

As early as 1523, when Christian II of Denmark came to the Netherlands, he asked Gossaert to paint the likenesses of his dwarfs. In 1528 he requested the artist to furnish to Jean de Hare the design for his queen Isabellas tomb in the abbey of St Pierre near Ghent. It was no doubt at this time that Gossaert completed the portraits of John, Dorothy and Christine, children of Christian II, which came into the collection of Henry VIII. No doubt, also, these portraits are identical with those of three children at Hampton Court, which were long known and often copied as likenesses of Prince Arthur, Prince Henry and Princess Margaret of England. One of the copies at Wilton, inscribed with the forged name of Hans Holbein, ye father, and the false date of 1495, has often been cited as a proof that Gossaert came to England in the reign of Henry VII; but the statement rests on no foundation whatever.

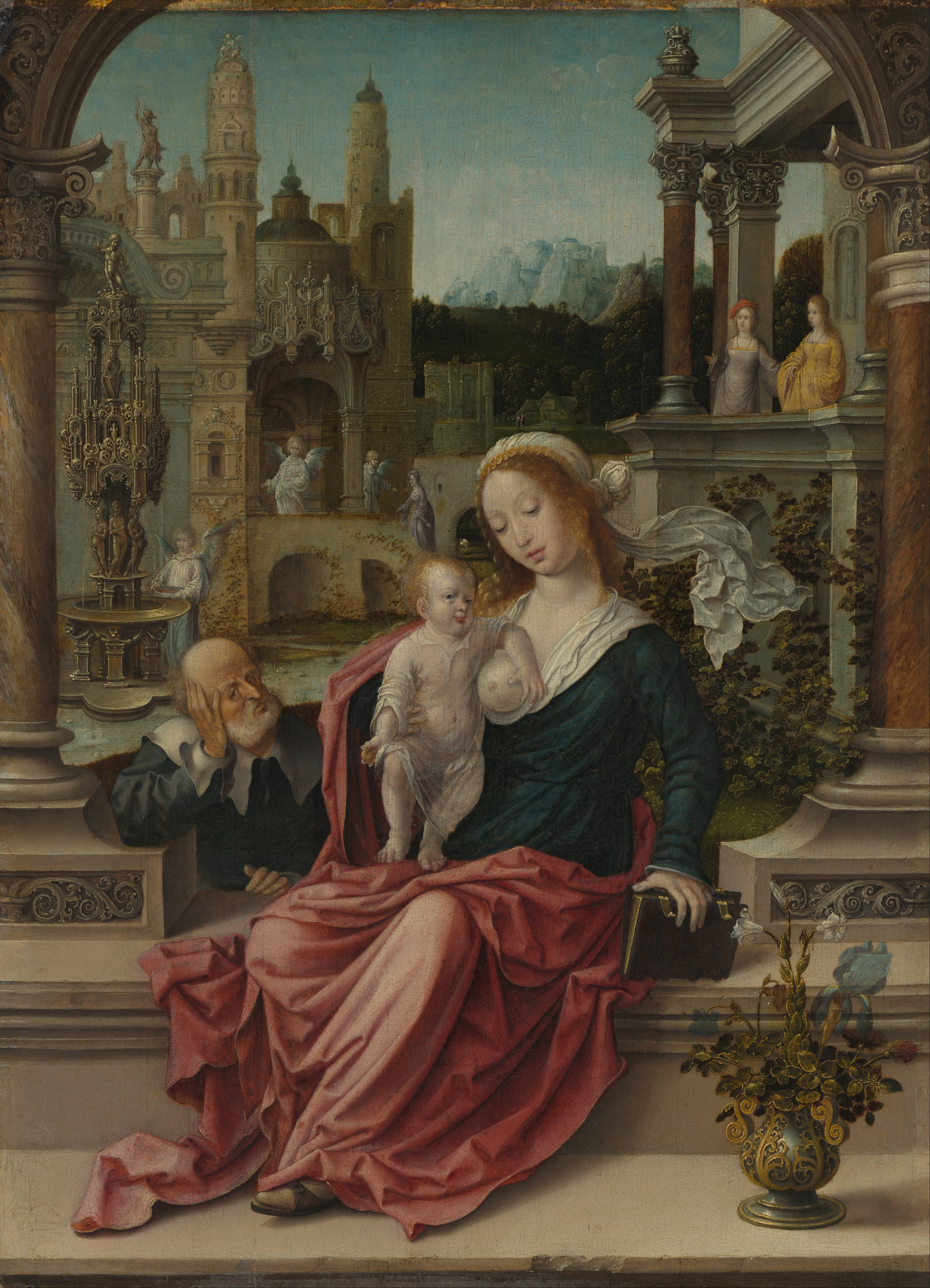
The Holy Family, 1507–1508

At the period when these portraits were executed Gossaert lived at Middelburg. But he dwelt at intervals elsewhere. When Philip of Burgundy became bishop of Utrecht, and settled at Duurstede Castle, in 1517, he was accompanied by Gossaert, who helped to decorate the new palace of his master. At Philip's death, in 1524, Gossaert designed and erected his tomb in the church of Wijk bij Duurstede. He finally retired to Middelburg, where he took service with Philip's brother, Adolph, lord of Veeren.

Carel van Mander's biography accuses Gossaert of an unruly life; yet it describes the solid education he must have had to learn his trade so well. It also describes the splendid appearance of Gossaert, dressed in gold brocade, as he accompanied Lucas van Leyden on a pleasure trip to Ghent, Mechelen and Antwerp in 1527. The works of Gossaert are those of a hardworking and patient artist; the number of his still extant pictures practically demonstrates that he was not a debauchee. The marriage of his daughter with the painter Henry van der Heyden of Leuven suggests that he had a home, and did not live habitually in taverns. His death at Antwerp is recorded in the portrait engraved by Jerome Cock.

Honoré de Balzac's Le chef-d'oeuvre inconnu (The Unknown Masterpiece) makes significant mention of Mabuse's work.

== Selected works ==
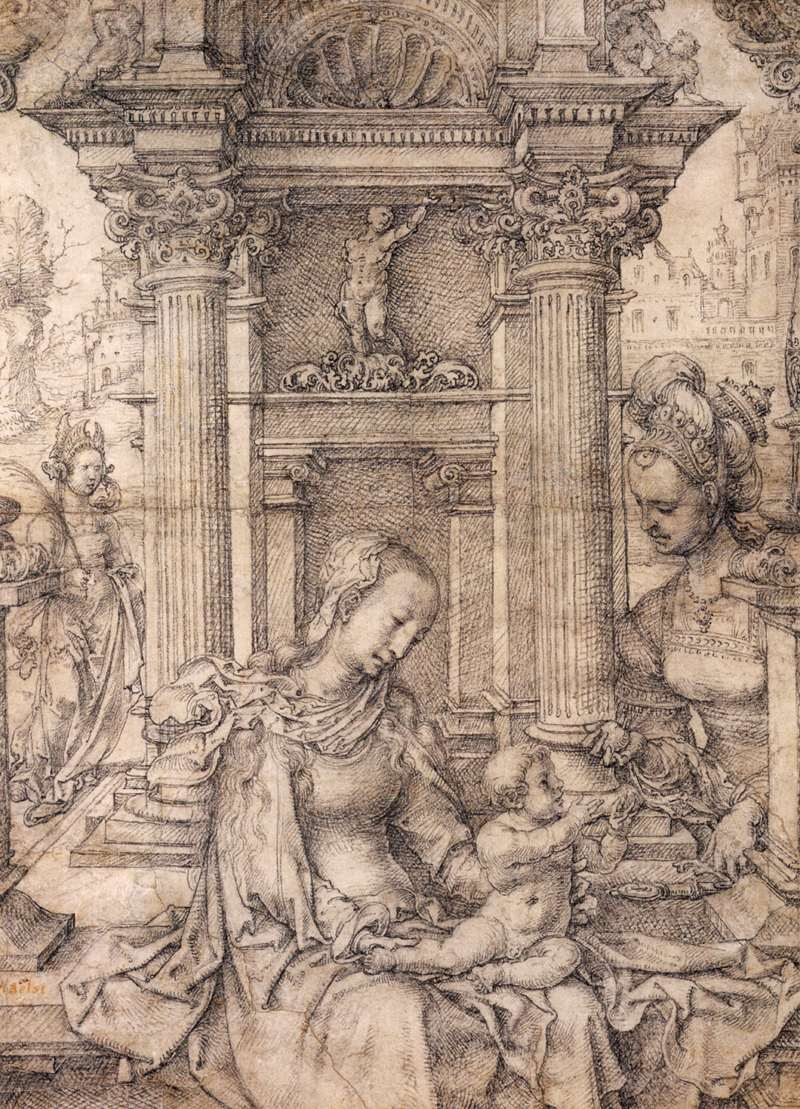
Drawing of Virgin and Child with Saints, c. 1511

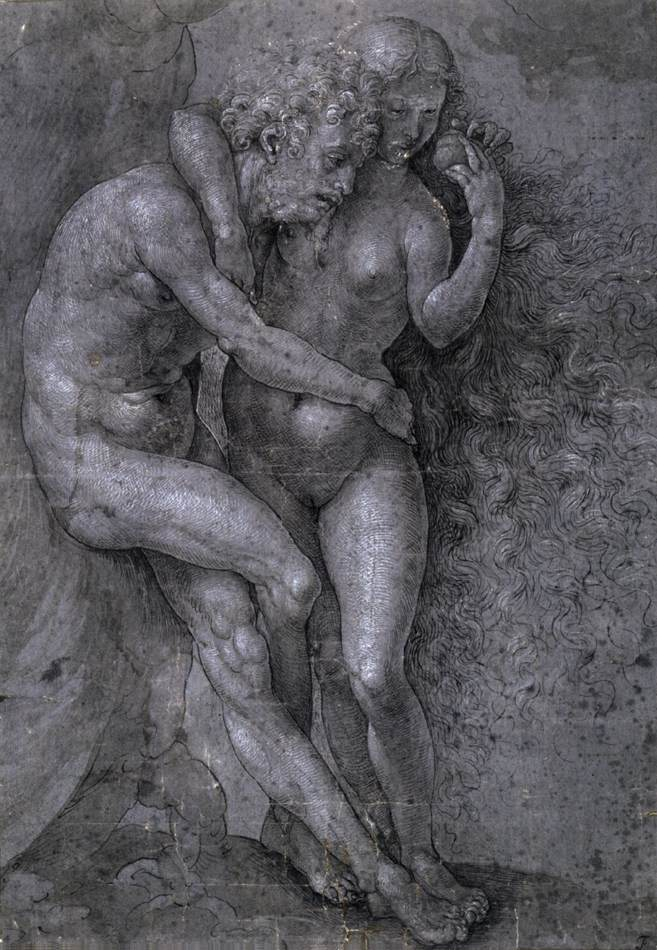
Adam and Eve c. 1515, Devonshire Collection

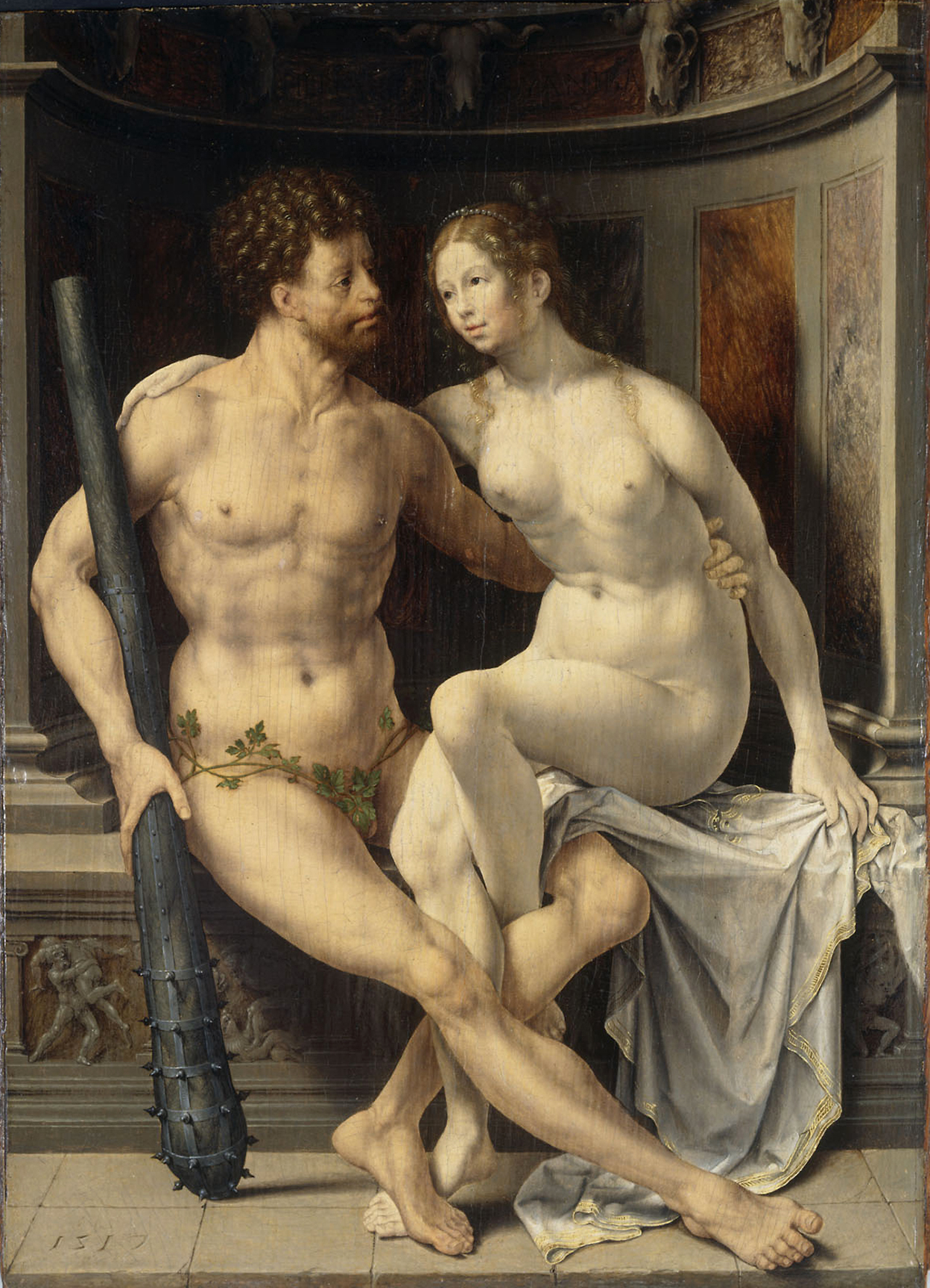
Hercules and Deianira, 1517

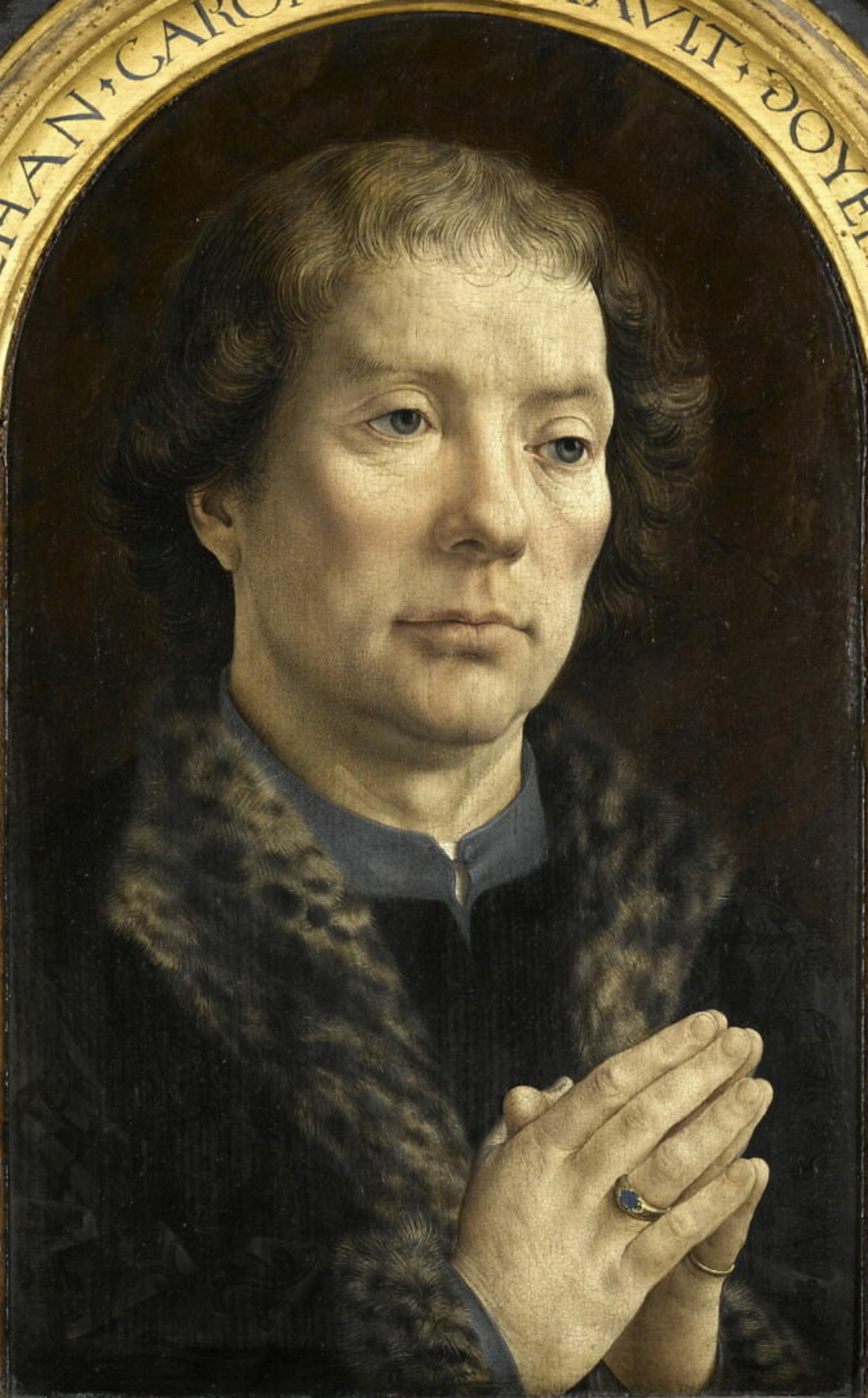
Jean Carondelet, c. 1517, Louvre

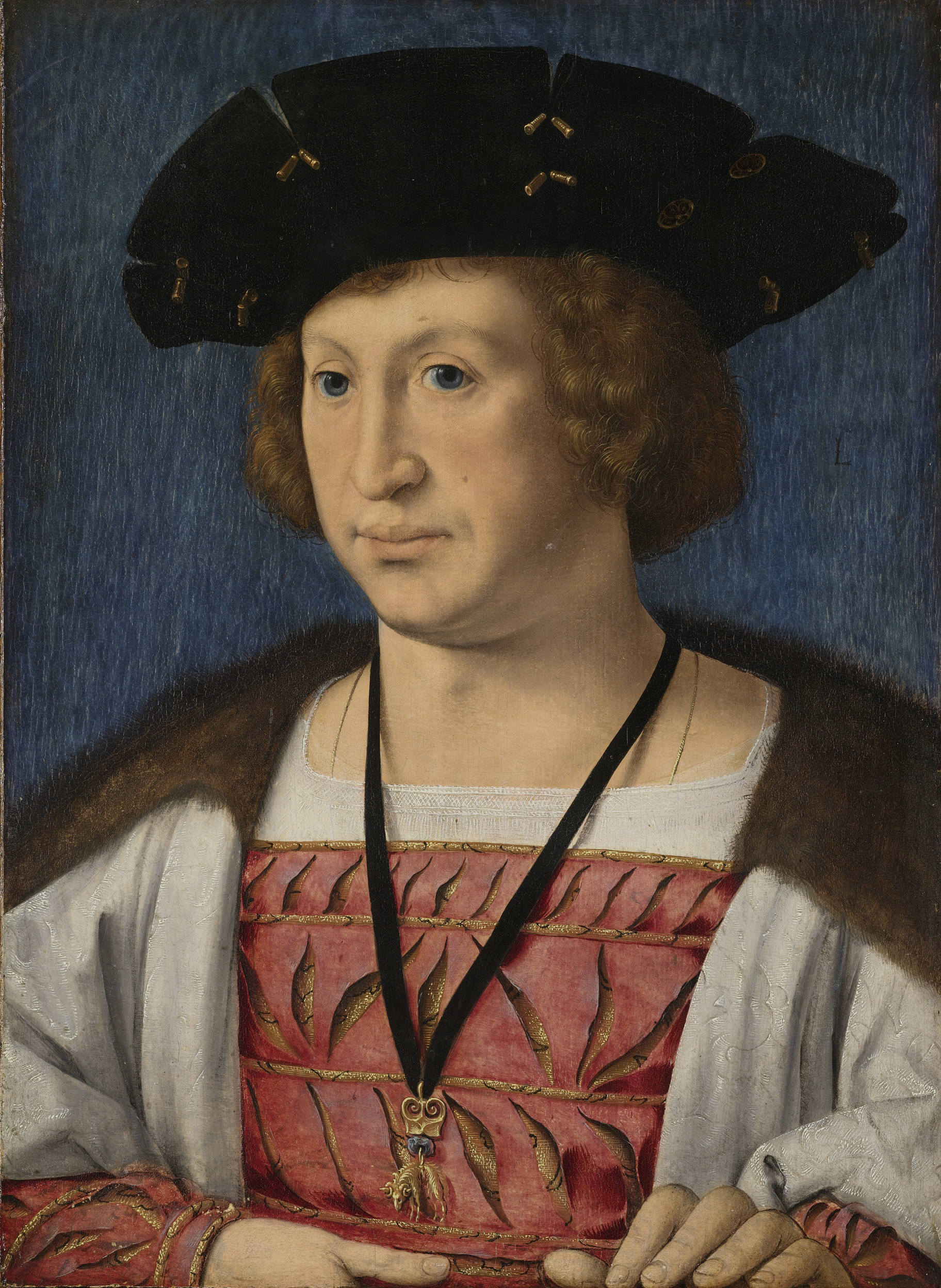
Floris van Egmond, 1519

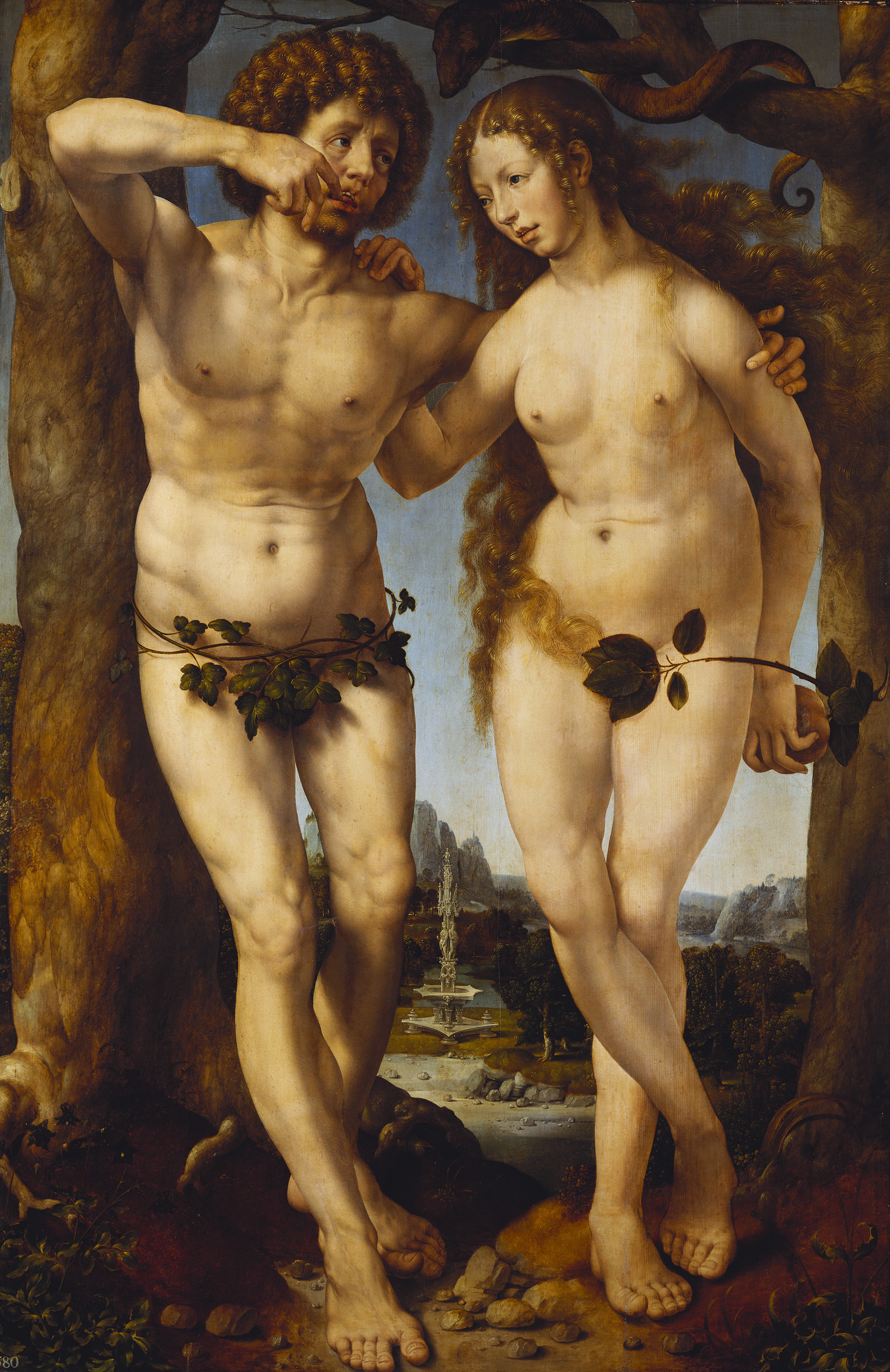
Adam and Eve c. 1520, Royal Collection

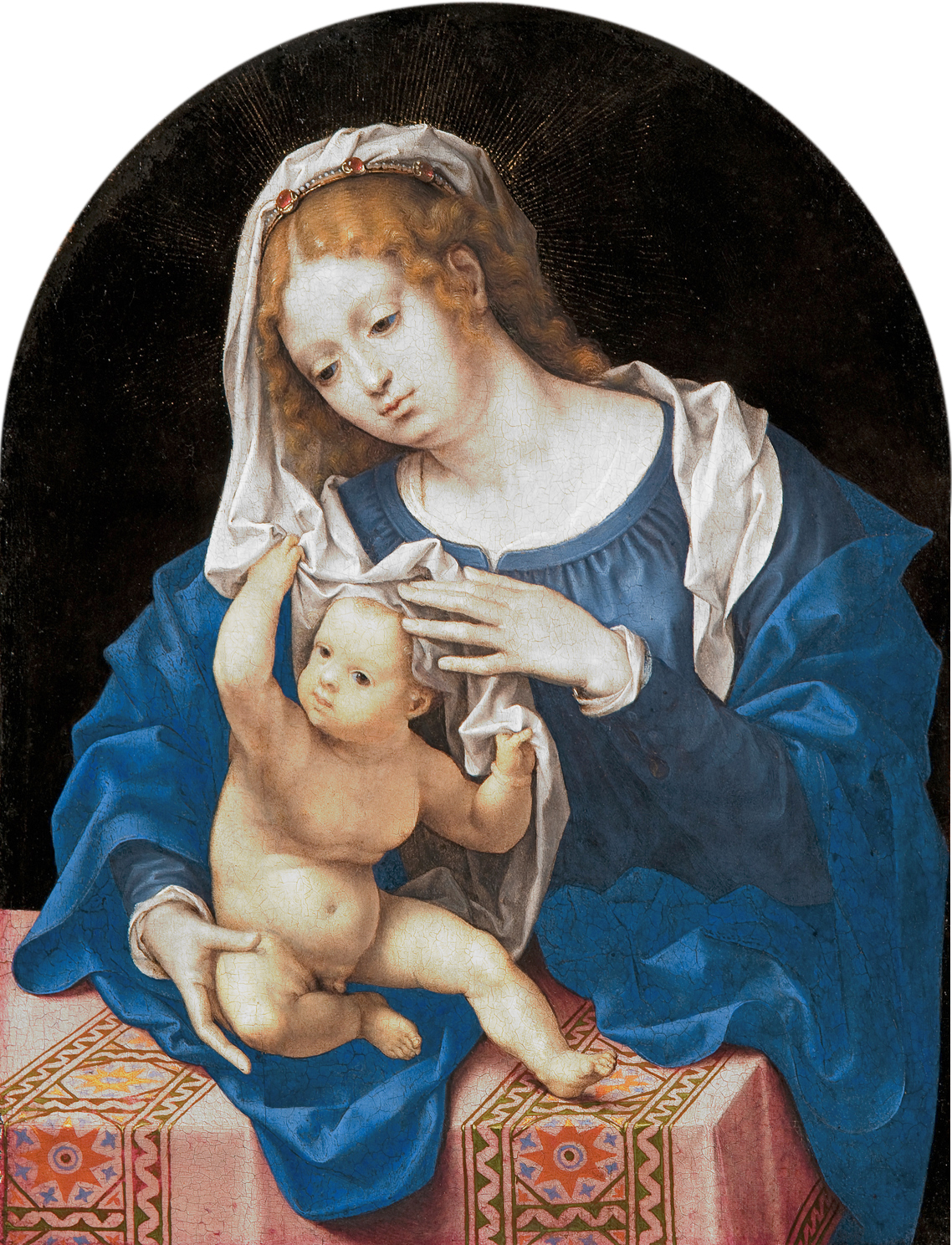
Madonna and Child Playing with the Veil 1520–1530, Mauritshuis

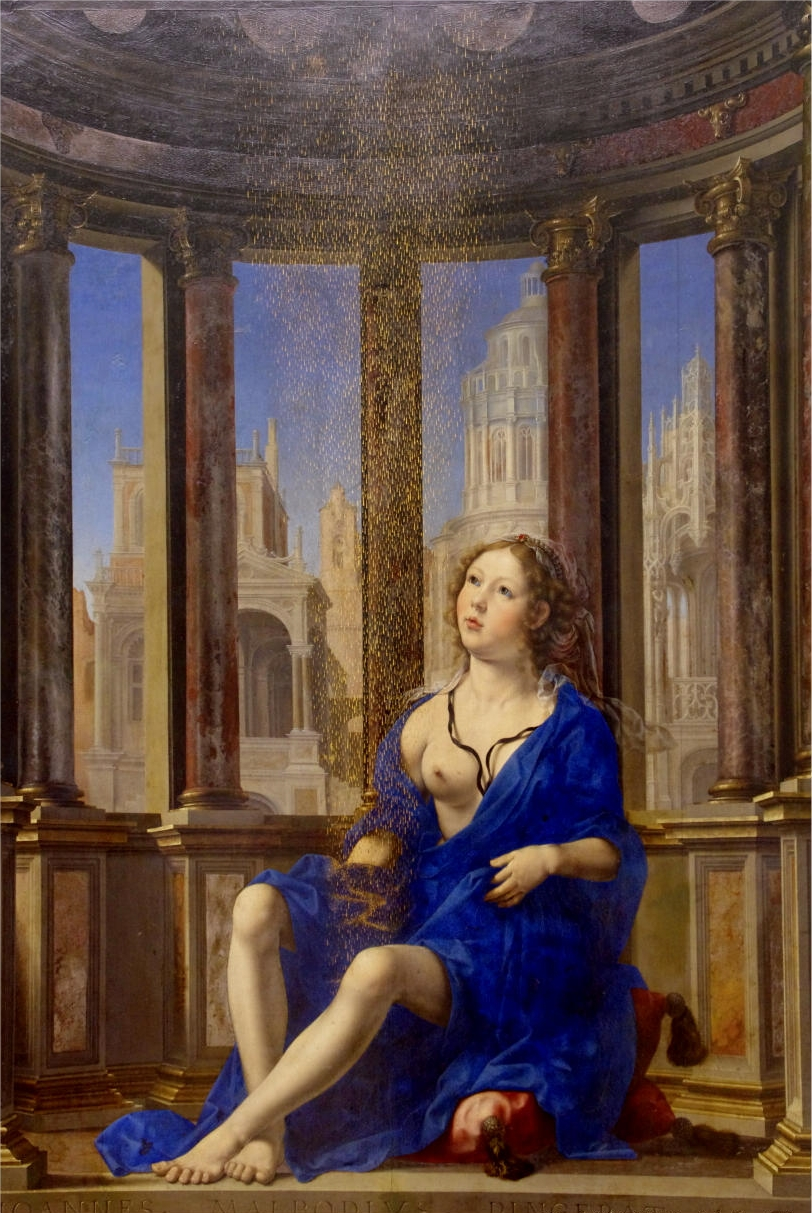
Danae, (1527)

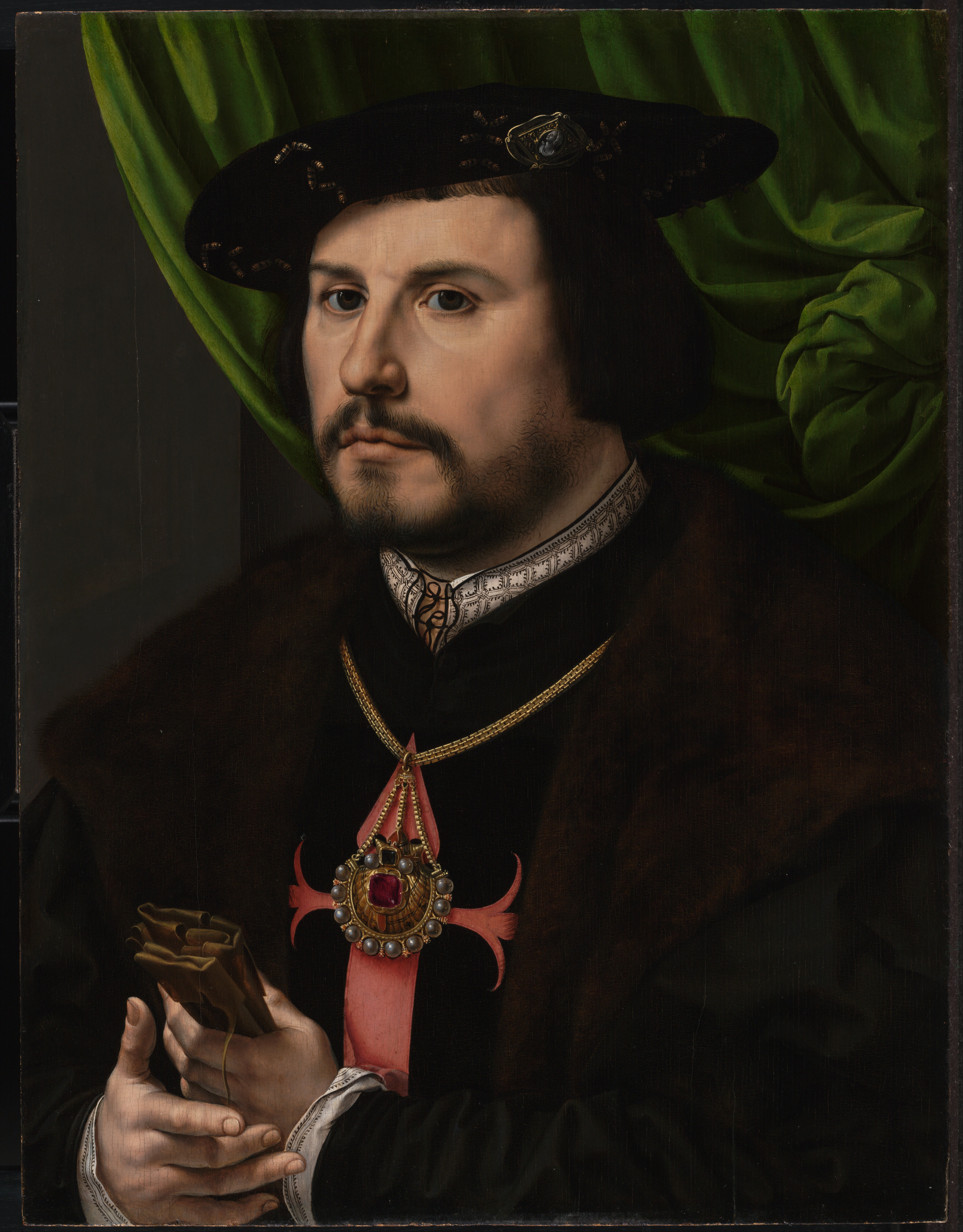
Portrait of Francisco de los Cobos y Molina, 1530

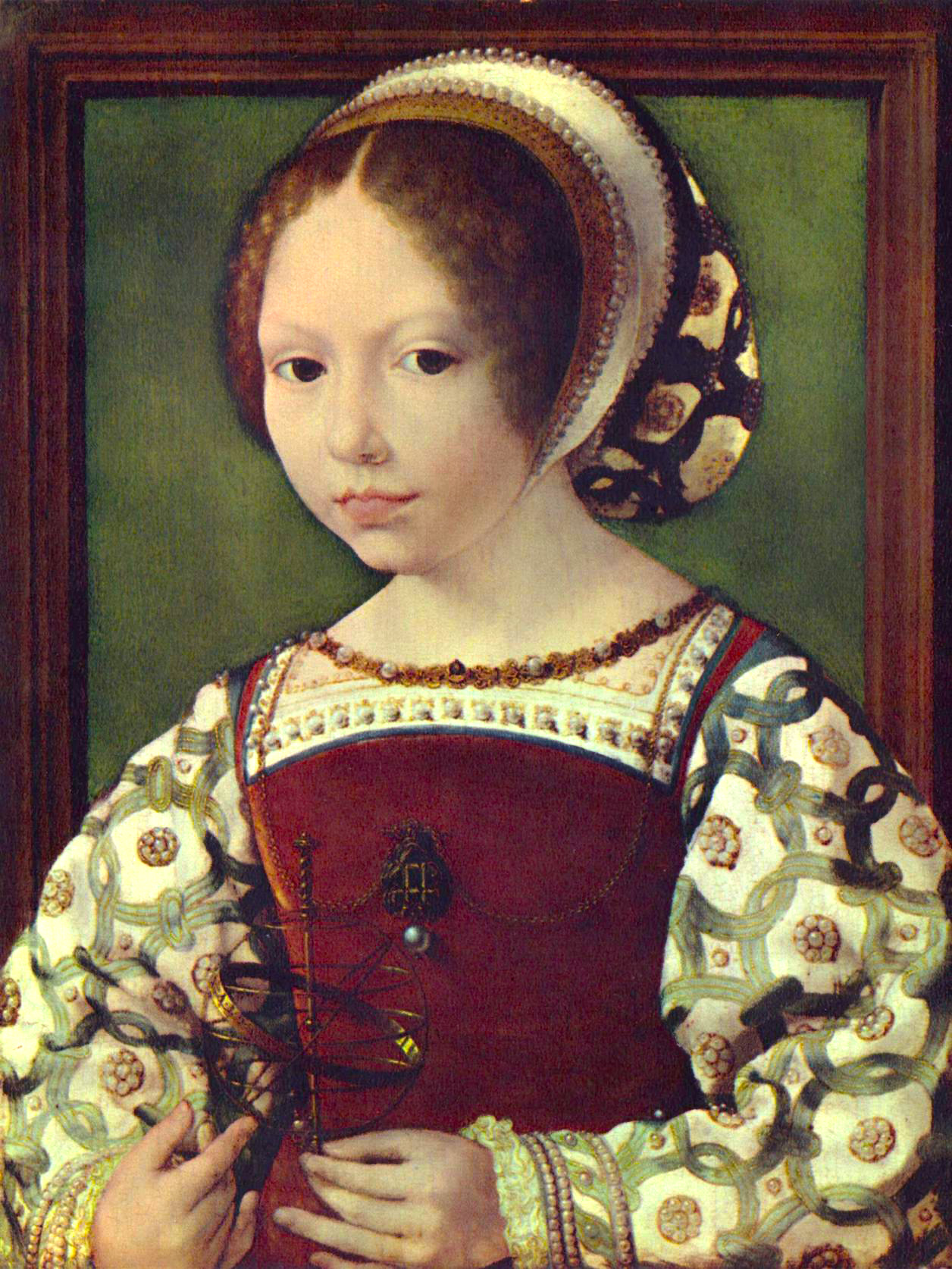
A Young Princess (Possibly Dorothea of Denmark) 1530

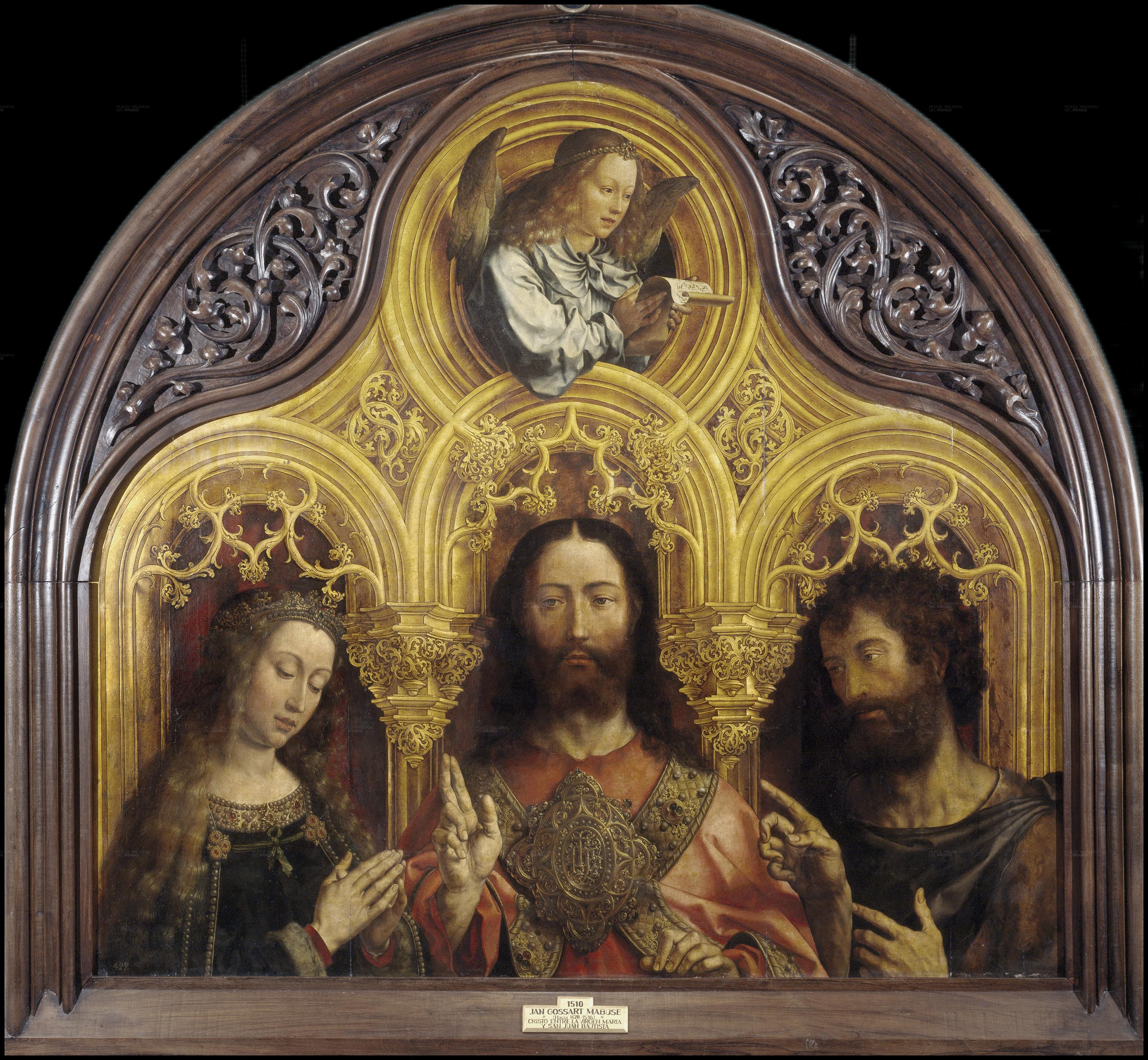
Christ between the Virgin and Saint John the Baptist, Prado Museum, Madrid.

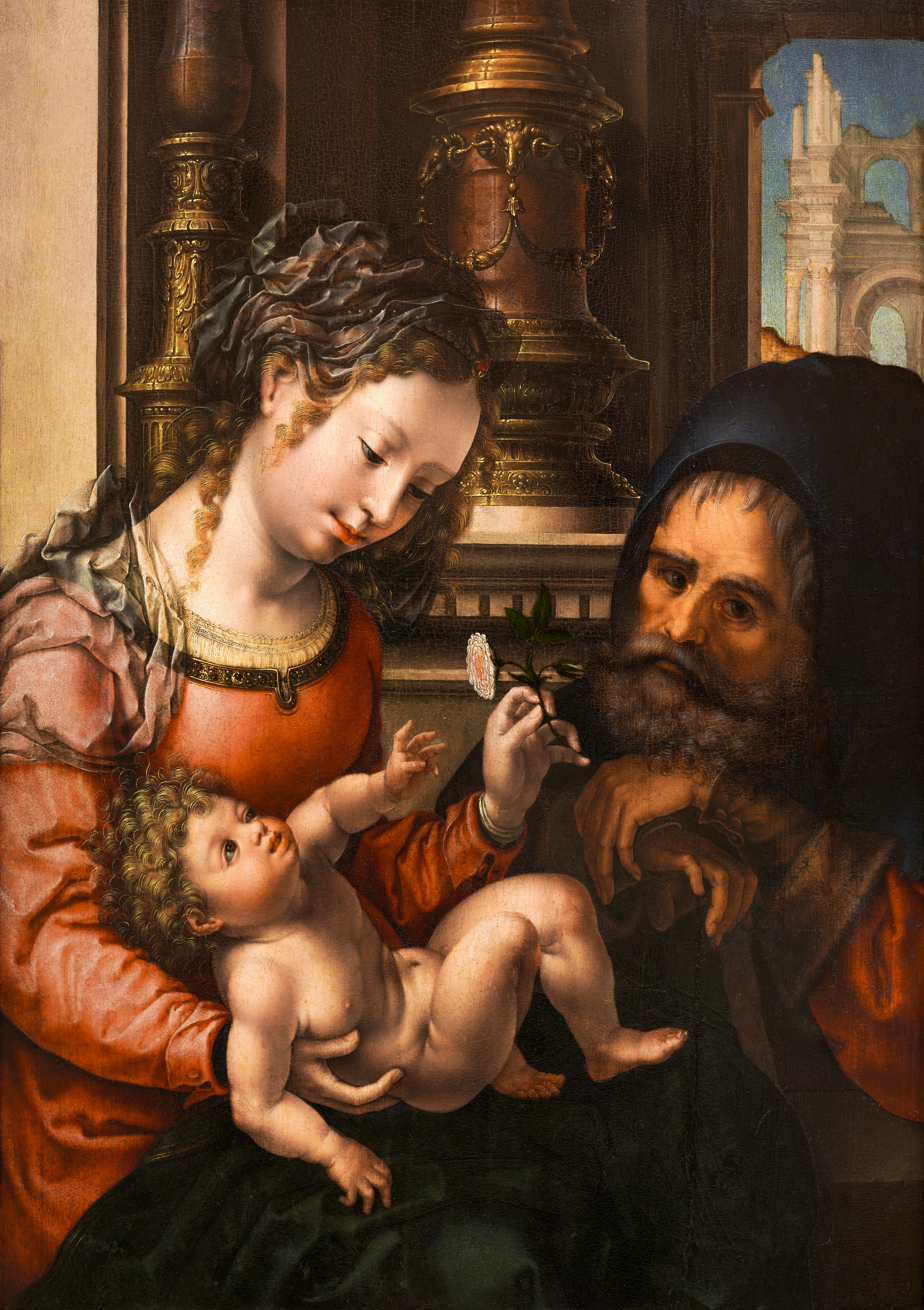
Holy Family, Bilbao, Museo de Bellas Artes, c. 1525-1530
