= Duurstede Castle =

Castle in Wijk bij Duurstede, Utrecht province, Netherlands

- Kasteel Duurstede
- Wijk bij Duurstede, the Netherlands
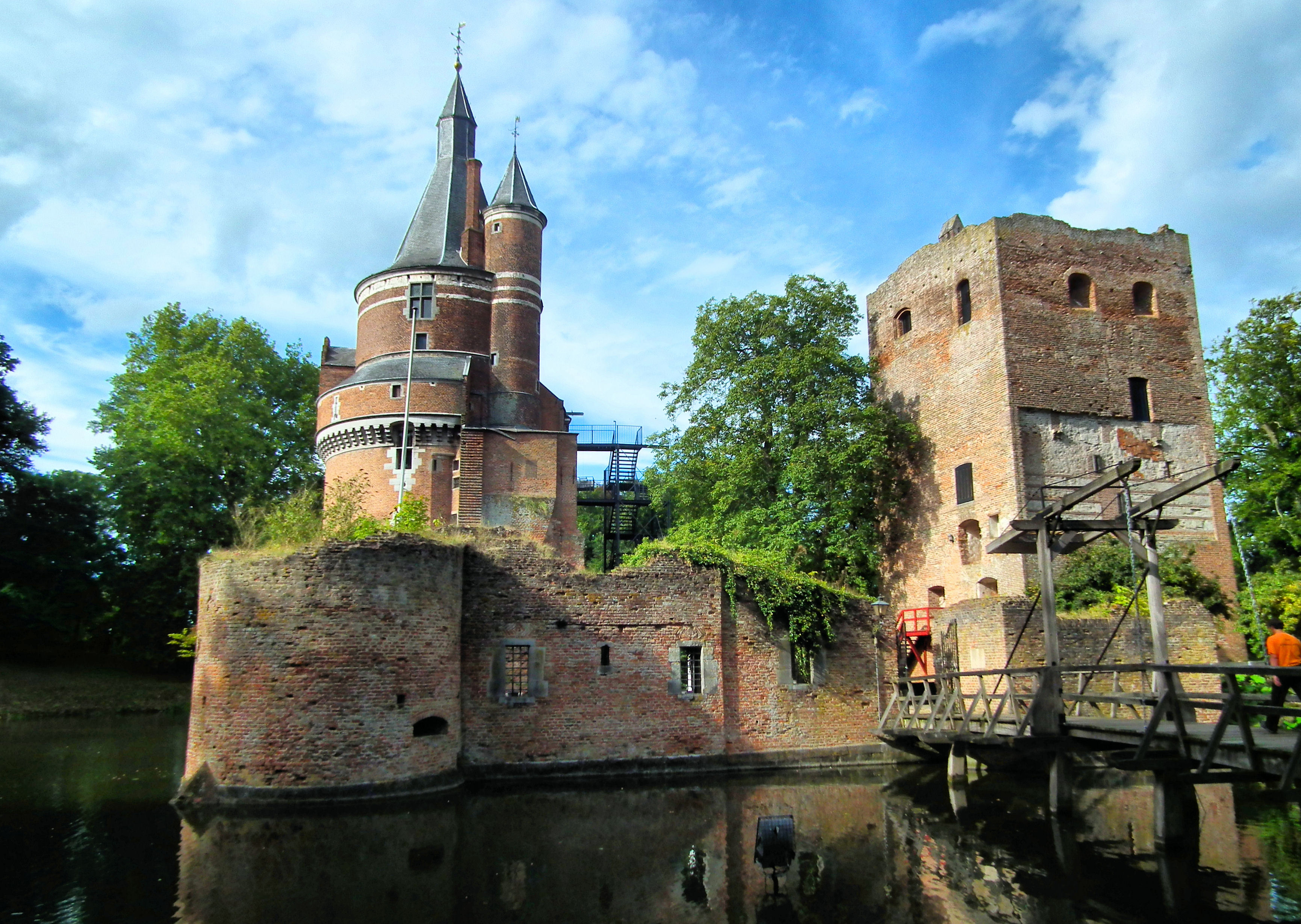
- Duurstede Castle in 2012

Site information
- Type: Castle
- Condition: Ruin

Location
- the Netherlands
- Coordinates: 51°58′10″N 5°20′36″E

Site history
- Built: 1270
- Built by: Zweder I van Zuylen van Abcoude; Bishop David of Burgundy
- Materials: Brick

Castle Duurstede (Dutch: Kasteel Duurstede) is a medieval castle in Wijk bij Duurstede in the province of Utrecht in the Netherlands.

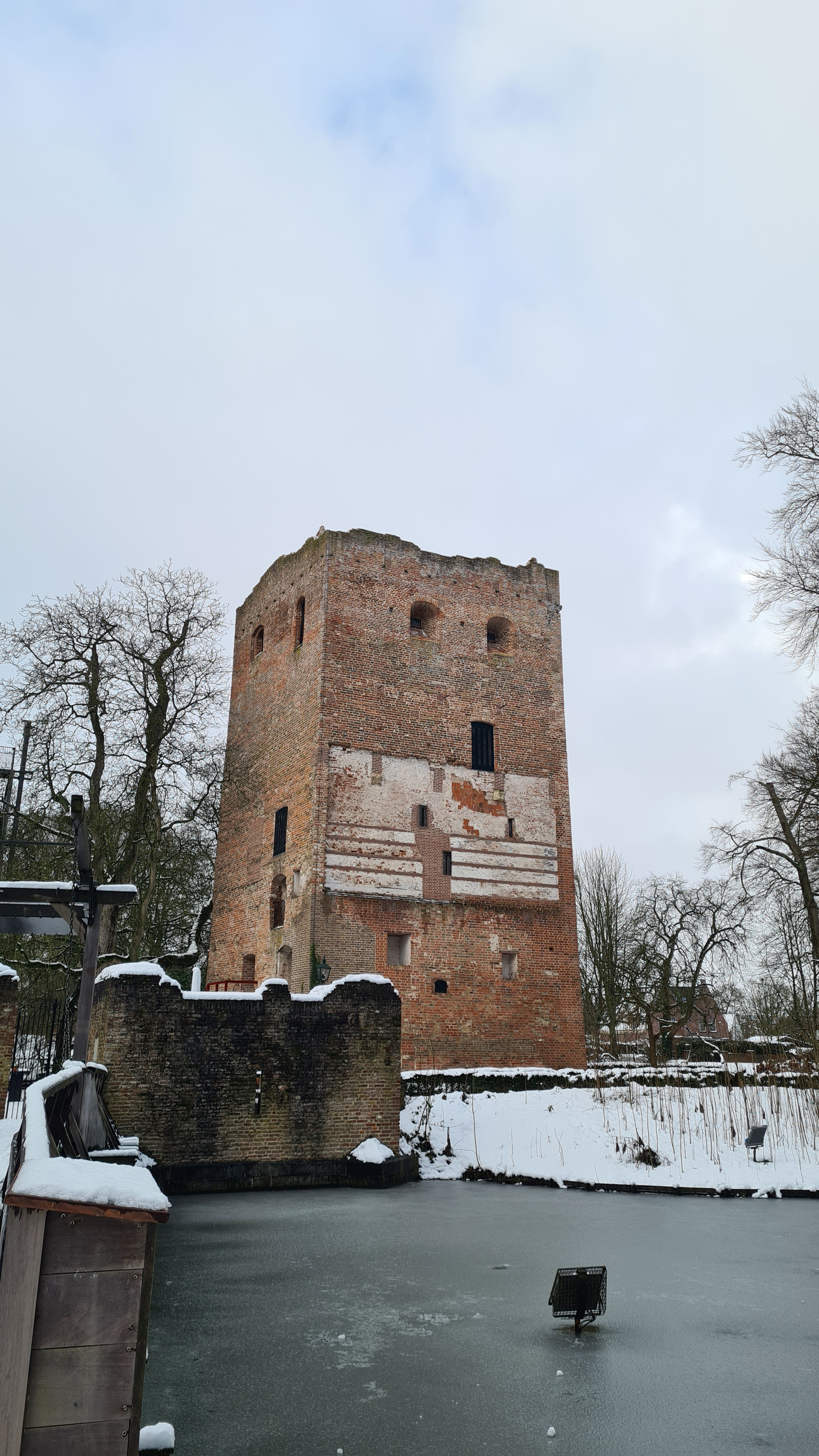
The 13th-century Donjon of Zweder I van Zuylen van Abcoude in 2026

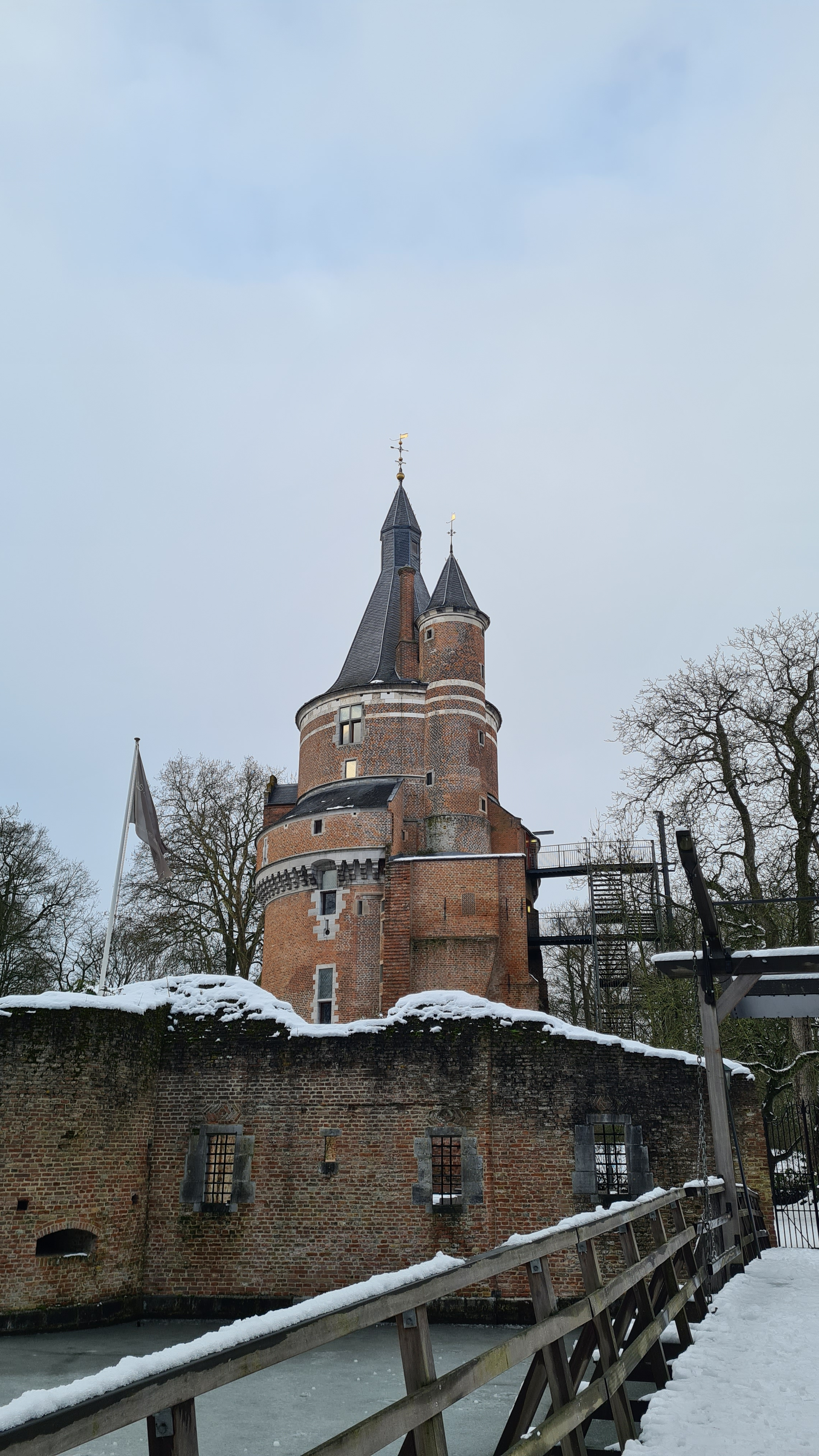
The 15th-century Burgundian tower in 2026

== Origin and development ==
The castle originated in the 13th century. Around 1270, Zweder I van Zuylen van Abcoude built a freestanding keep on a raised and moated site near the lost city Dorestad. Until the beginning of the 15th century Duurstede Castle was in possession by the Van Zuylen van Abcoude family, until they were forced to sell it to the bishops of Utrecht in 1449.

Bishop David of Burgundy, who reigned from 1459 to 1496, completely rebuilt the castle. The old donjon was enclosed by new buildings. The still intact burgundian tower was also built around this time. His successors Frederick IV of Baden and Philip of Burgundy also used the castle as their residence, and Philip of Burgundy embellished the castle with renaissance features. Philip of Burgundy settled at Duurstede Castle when he became bishop of Utrecht in 1517. He was accompanied by his court painter Mabuse (Jan Gossaert), who helped to decorate the new palace of his master. At Philip's death, in 1524, Mabuse designed and erected his tomb in the church of Wijk bij Duurstede. After Philip's death, Charles V, Holy Roman Emperor confiscated all territorial possessions of the bishopric of Utrecht, including Duurstede Castle.

== Later years ==
In 1580, as a result of the Dutch Revolt, the castle fell into the hands of the States of Utrecht. The states, however, invested their money into building modern fortification around Wijk bij Duurstede, and as a result the castle fell into neglect. Further damage was done when French troops devastated Wijk by Duurstede in 1672, after which the townspeople used stone from the castle to rebuild their homes.

In 1852 the town council became owner of the castle and turned the surrounding fortifications into a park. Until 1925 the castle could only be reached by a little ferry.

=== The Donjon ===
The old donjon built by Zweder van Abcoude in the 13th century has withstood the passage of time reasonably well, and is an excellent example of medieval towers. The walls are 2.5 metres thick; the original entrance was at the second level and could only be reached with a wooden ladder that could be removed or destroyed in times of need.

=== The Burgundian Tower ===
One of the corner towers of the old castle was expanded in the 15th century into its current form. While the rest of the castle had a more residential purpose, the Burgundian tower obviously had a military purpose. It is more than 40 metres high, and has very thick walls.

== Film and TV ==
Castle Duurstede was used in the following films and TV-shows:

- Bassie en Adriaan
- De Diamant
- Het Monster van Toth in 1999, a Telekids film with leading roles for Carlo Boszhard and Irene Moors
- The interior shots as Spanish castle for De Club van Sinterklaas & Paniek in de Confettifabriek (2006)
- Lady Death: The Motion Picture

== See also ==
- List of castles in the Netherlands
