= Philip of Burgundy (bishop) =

Dutch Catholic bishop

- Bishop of Utrecht
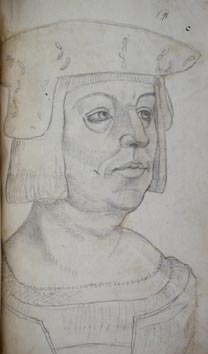
- Philip of Burgundy by Jacques Le Boucq, after an original by Jan Gossaert.
- Church: Catholic Church
- Diocese: Diocese of Utrecht
- Appointed: 18 March 1517
- Term ended: 7 April 1524
- Predecessor: Frederick IV of Baden
- Successor: Henry of the Palatinate

Orders
- Consecration: 28 Feb 1518 by Érard de La Marck

Personal details
- Born: 1464 Brussels
- Died: 7 April 1524 (aged 59–60) Wijk bij Duurstede

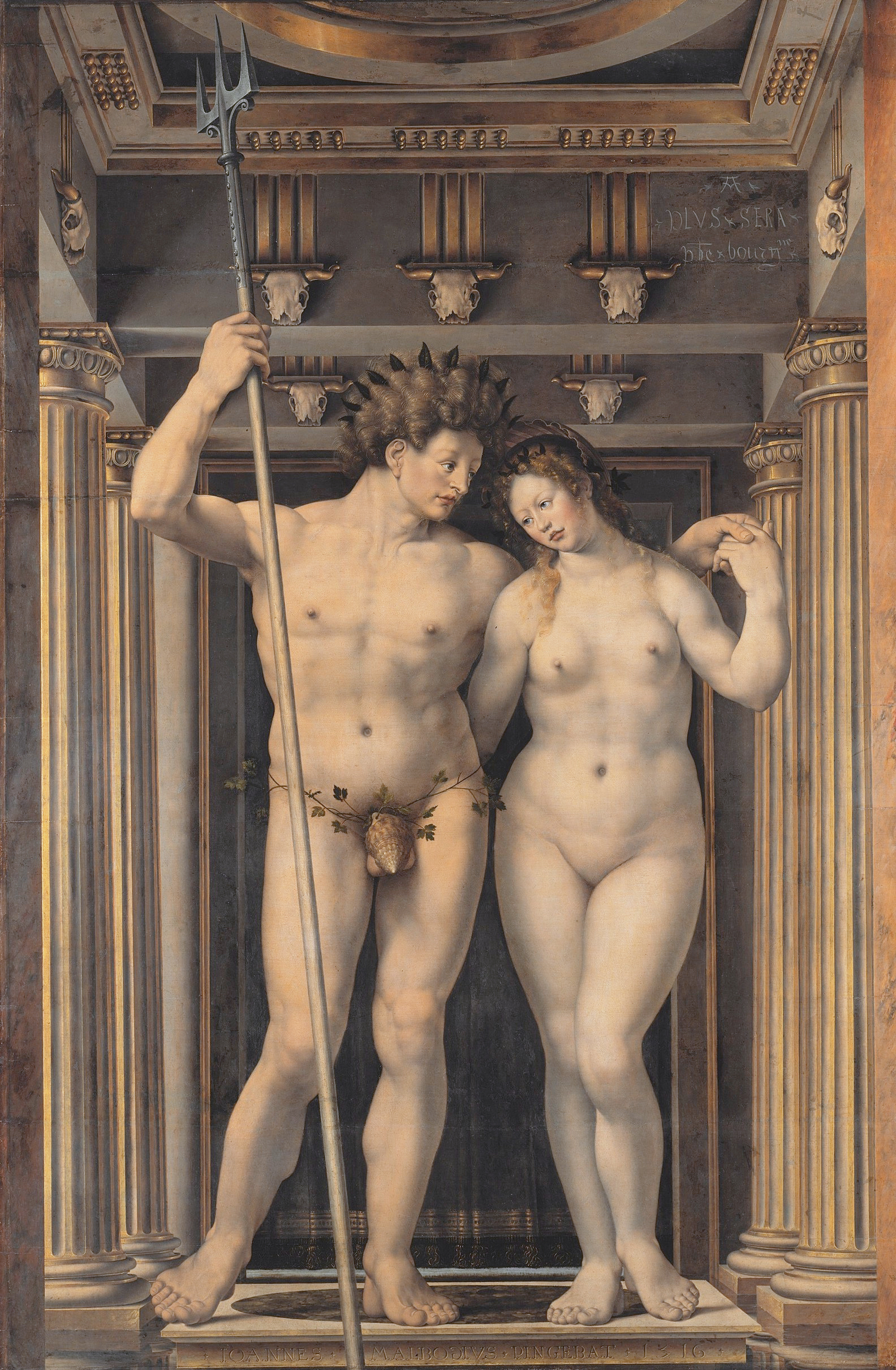
Nepture and Amphitrite by Jan Gossaert in the Gemäldegalerie in Berlin. The Neptune of the painting is a symbolic personification of Philip's admiralty

Philip of Burgundy (1464 in Brussels – 7 April 1524 in Wijk bij Duurstede) was Admiral of the Netherlands from 1498 to 1517 and bishop of Utrecht from 1517 to 1524.

Philip was an illegitimate son of Duke Philip the Good. 1486 he was knighted and in 1491 he single-handedly killed an opponent. He was at the head of the Burgundian army in the Sticht and, as such, refused to bury his half-brother David of Burgundy, bishop of Utrecht, as long as the election of a Burgundian-favoured successor had not been arranged. He was appointed admiral in 1498 by Duke Philip the Fair and after an expedition to Rome in 1508 he settled in the castle Souburg on Walcheren.

In a politically motivated move, Philip was appointed bishop of Utrecht by Duke Charles (later Emperor Charles V) to replace Frederick IV of Baden as Sovereign of the Prince-Bishopric of Utrecht. When he made his entrance into Utrecht he had not received any kind of ordination; these were given to him in the following days. He led a luxurious life in the episcopal residence, Duurstede Castle, taking a particular interested in weaponry, women and horses. He was a true renaissance-ruler, and was little concerned with religious matters, which he delegated to his servants. He ignored the rising Lutheranism.

Philip's politics were not very successful; he left much to his councillors and had trouble keeping himself standing in the midst of the faction-struggles in the bishopric. During his rule the Oversticht was largely lost in the Guelders War between the Empire and Guelders. The bishopric maintained only Hasselt, Steenwijk and Oldenzaal.

Philips only positive contribution was his patronage of the arts. For years he maintained the painter Jan Gossaert and the humanist Gelderhouwer, and he acted as a protector of Erasmus. He also was the sculptor Conrad Meit's first employer in the Low Countries. He also owned works by Hieronymous Bosch.

== Sources ==
- Sicking, L. (1998). Zeemacht en onmacht, Maritieme politiek in de Nederlanden, 1488–1558. De Bataafse Leeuw, Amsterdam. ISBN 90-6707-465-9.

Preceded by Frederick IV of Baden	Bishop of Utrecht; 1517–1524	Succeeded by Henry of the Palatinate (bishop)
