= Madonna and Child Playing with the Veil =

Painting by Jan Gossaert

Madonna and Child Playing With the Veil
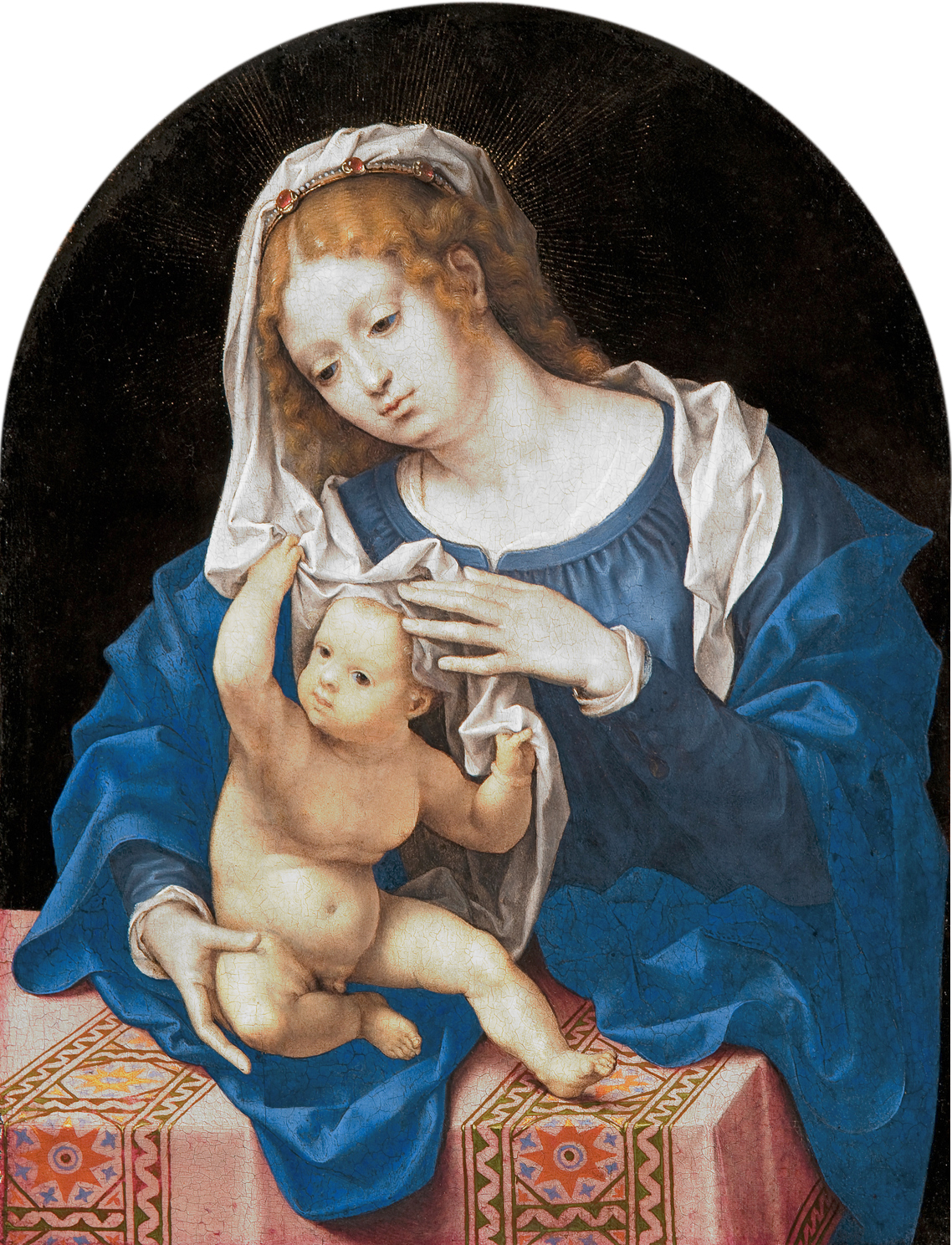
- Artist: Jan Gossaert (Mabuse)
- Year: 1520–1530
- Type: Oil on wood
- Dimensions: 25.4 cm × 18.3 cm (10.0 in × 7.2 in)
- Location: Mauritshuis, The Hague

The Madonna and Child Playing With the Veil, is a devotional painting finished around 1520–1530 by the Flemish High Renaissance painter Jan Gossaert. It is housed in the Mauritshuis museum of The Hague, Netherlands.

== Composition ==
This work is one of the most copied works of Gossaert (Mabuse) with over twenty known copies dated to within a decade of the (unspecified) original, and depicts the Virgin with the Christ child with both arms above His head, playing with Mary's veil. Many copies were documented by Max Jakob Friedländer.

== Symbolism ==
Most of the known copies follow the original quite closely, but include different objects in the foreground and background. Most copies were probably made for a specific church or mecenas, though this information has often been lost. According to the RKD, a copy hangs in the Palencia Cathedral. This natural pose of Christ playing with the veil seems to have become quite popular, and two copies are known that have been done by the contemporary painter Pauwels Coeke van Aelst, the bastard half-brother of Pieter van Aelst.

This devotional subject is not to be confused with other devotional Mabuse Madonnas (or the one at the National Gallery which is also dated 1520) posed without a veil, that includes a disguised portrait. An example is the one identified as Anna van Bergen, the wife of Adolf of Burgundy, and that was also copied many times. A similar Mabuse Madonna without a veil that was also a disguised portrait was made for Jean Carondelet in the Diptich of Jean Carandelet and his wife that hangs today in the Louvre, but was painted for the Besançon Cathedral. According to Van Mander in 1604, there were many copies of Mabuse Madonnas to be found in Middelburg.

== Copies attributed to Gossaert ==
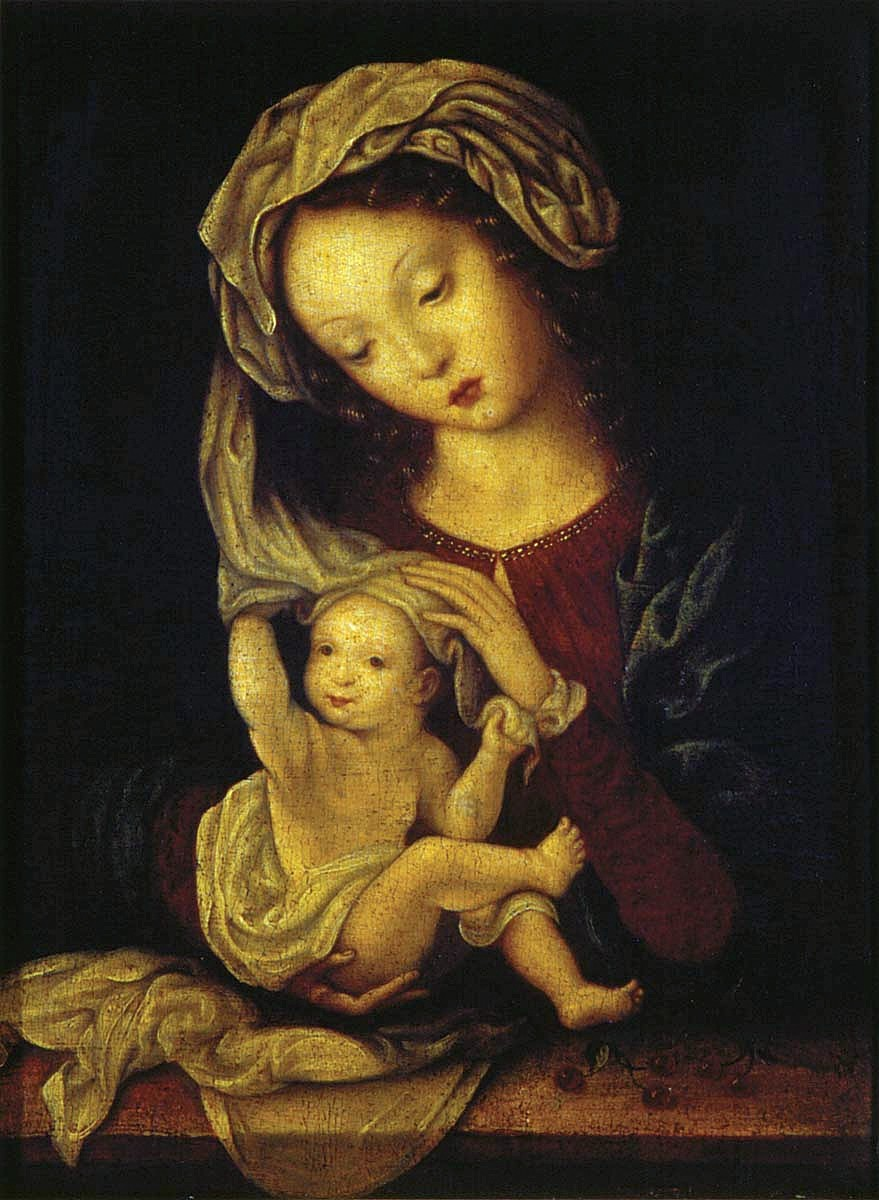
other version in Brazil

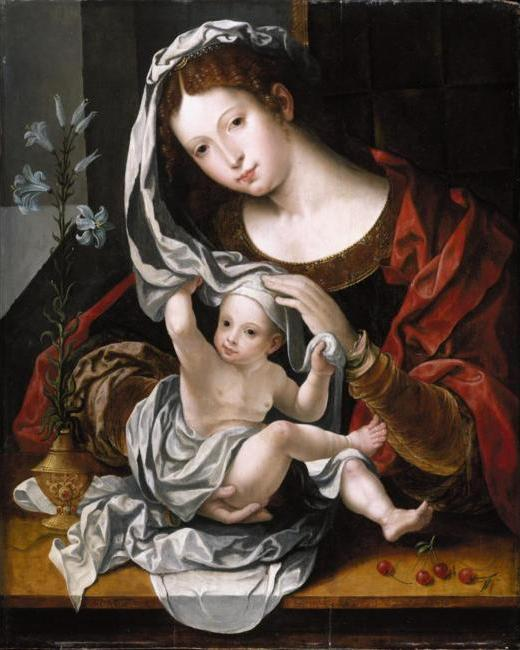
other version with white lily and cherries

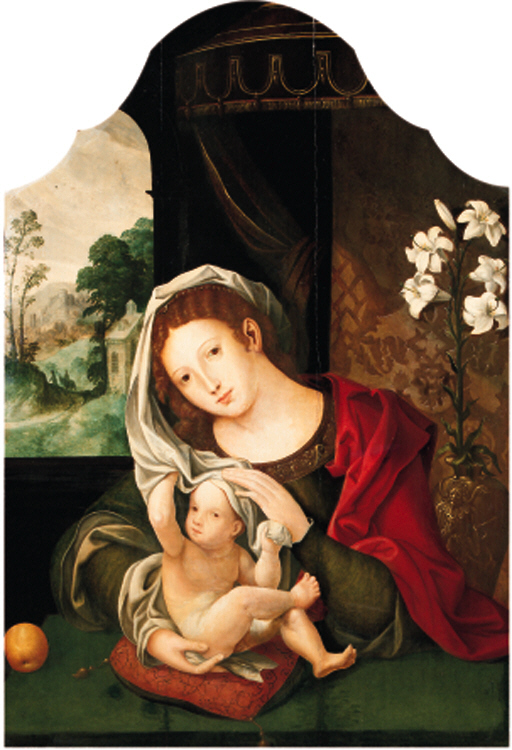
Other version with orange in the foreground and a version of Flight into Egypt in the background.

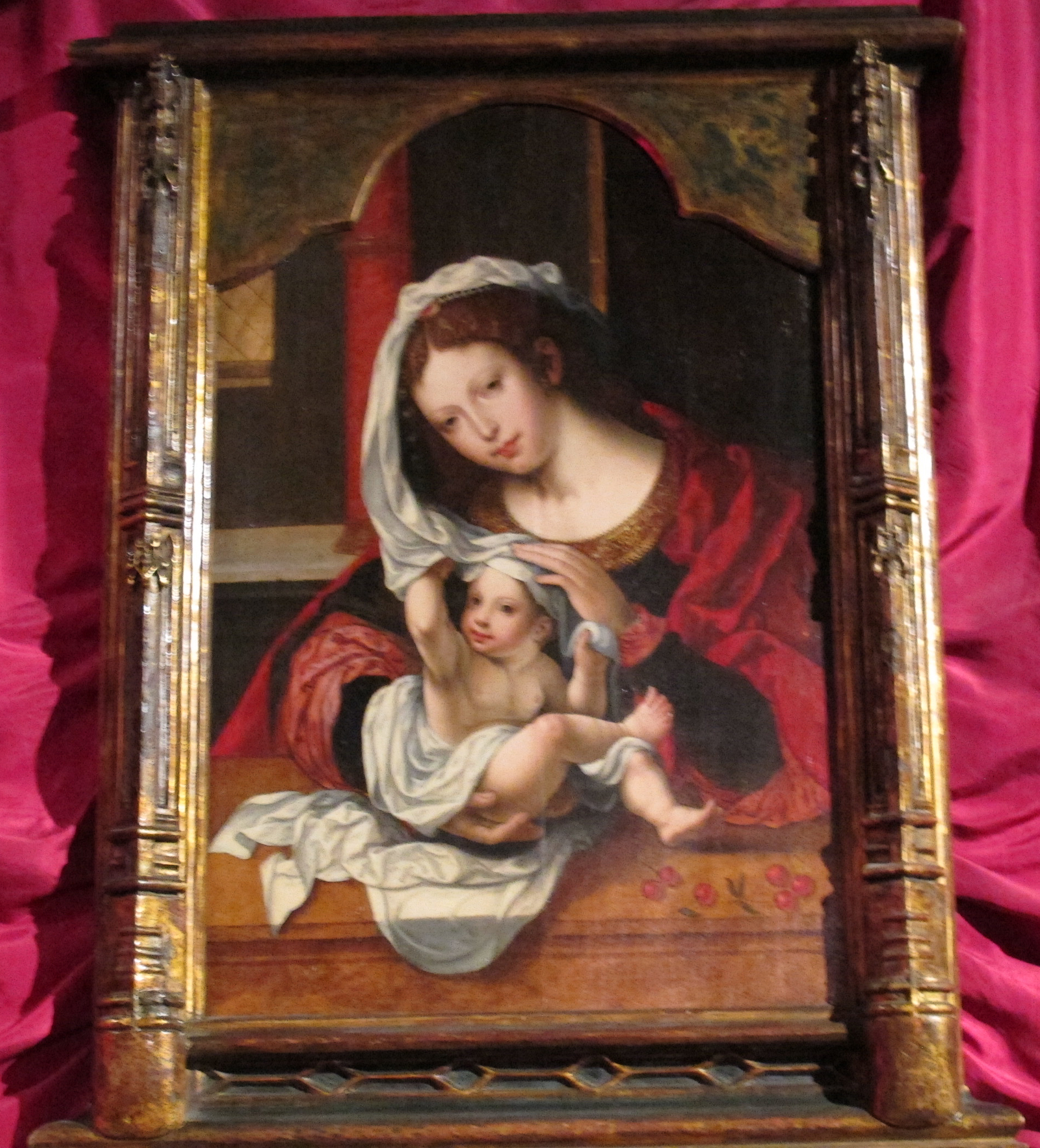
Version in Museo Nazionale di Palazzo Mansi, Lucca

== Other copies ==
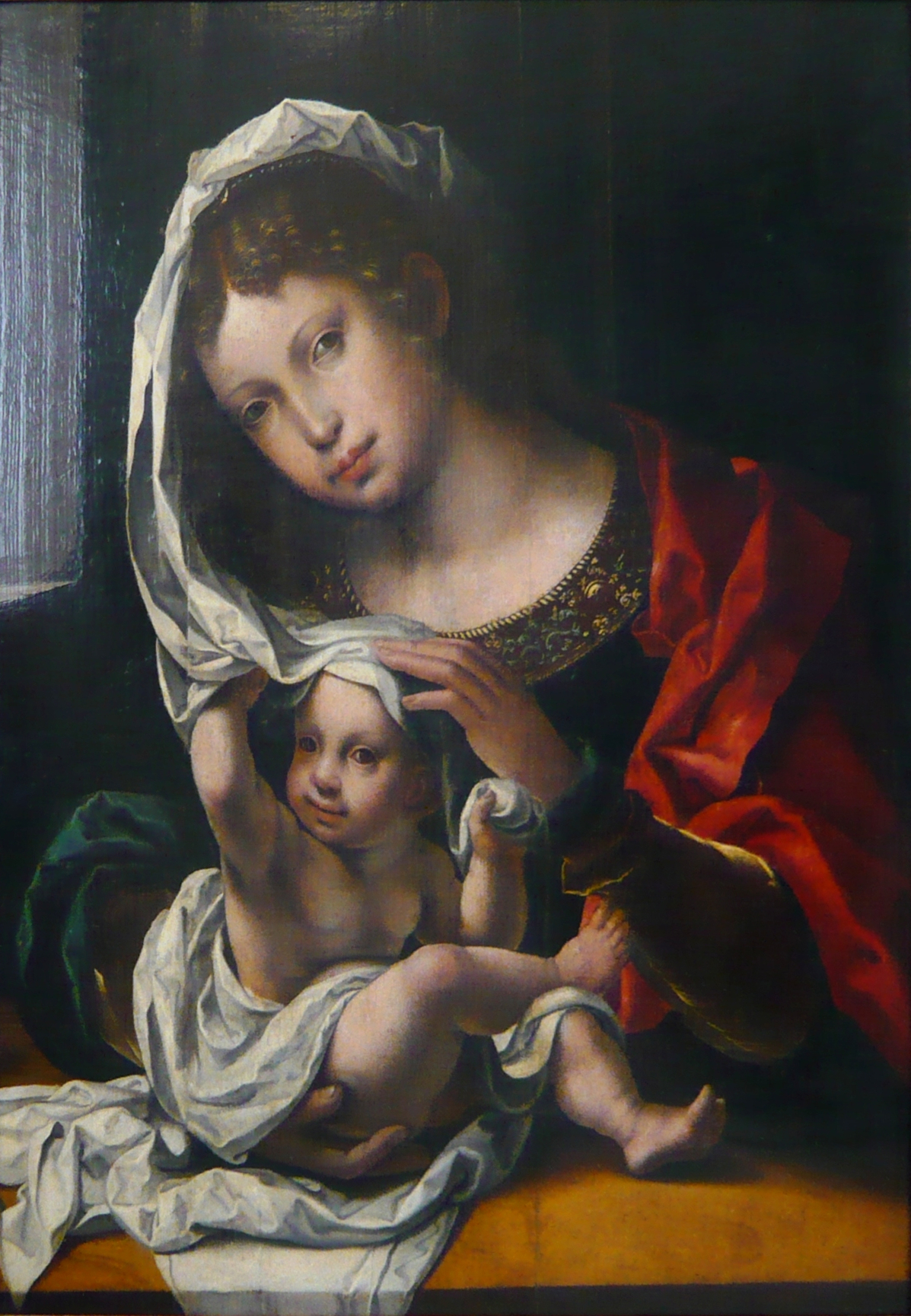
Copy hanging in the Anhaltische Gemäldegalerie of the Georgium Palace, Dessau
