= Anne of Burgundy, Lady of Ravenstein =

Anne of Burgundy
- Anna van Bourgondië
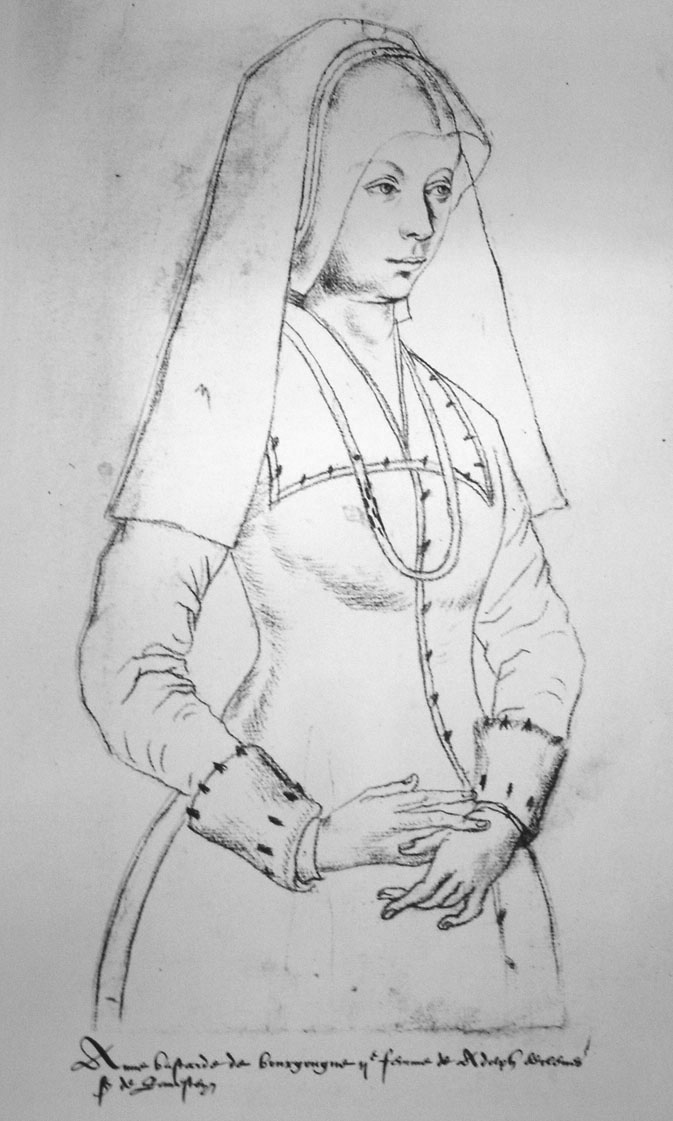
- Born: circa 1435
- Died: 14 January 1508
- Known for: Governess of Mary of Burgundy, illegitimate child of Philip the Good
- Title: Lady of Ravensburg
- Spouses: Adriaan van Borselen (m. 1457–1468) Adolph of Cleves, Lord of Ravenstein (m. 1470–1492)
- Parent(s): Philip the Good; Jacqueline van Steenberghe
- Family: House of Valois-Burgundy

Anne, Lady of Ravenstein, previously Anna van Borselen (circa 1435 – 14 January 1508), was the governess of Mary, suo jure Duchess of Burgundy, herself a member of the House of Valois-Burgundy as an illegitimate daughter of Philip III, Duke of Burgundy ("Philip the Good").

== Life ==
=== Early life ===
Anne was born around 1435 as one of the numerous illegitimate children of Philip the Good, Duke of Burgundy. She had three older legitimate half-brothers and at least seventeen illegitimate half-siblings. Her mother was one of the duke's twenty-four documented mistresses, Jacqueline van Steenberghe, of whom not much else is known. Anne was acknowledged as the duke's child and raised in her father's court.

=== First marriage ===
In 1457, around the age of 22, Anne married Adriaan van Borselen, her father's chamberlain, a Dutch nobleman from Zeeland. Van Borselen had been knighted in 1426, and owned numerous manors on the island of Walcheren in Zeeland (Brigdamme, West-Souburg, Oost-Souburg, Sint-Laurens, Popkensburg, Koudekerke, Zoutelande, Kleverskerke, Grijpskerke, Meliskerke, and Ritthem). The couple lived in the one in West-Souburg, and had no children together. Around the time of her first wedding, Anne was put in charge of the education of her niece, Mary, daughter of her legitimate half-brother Charles I, Duke of Burgundy ("Charles the Bold"; 1433–1477). She appointed Jeanne de Clito to teach her.

Anne and her husband founded villages and financed the construction of churches such as the ones in Sommelsdijk (1464) and Bruinisse (1466), working together with other landowners. She was also active in the impoldering and diking of salt marshes. In 1468, Adriaan van Borselen died and Anne inherited all of his possessions.

=== Second marriage ===
In 1470, now aged 35, Anne remarried to her cousin, Adolph of Cleves, Lord of Ravenstein and Wijnendale. He was the younger son of Adolph I, Duke of Cleves and Mary of Burgundy, Anne's paternal aunt. Adolph was also widowed and had previously been married to Infanta Beatrice of Coimbra, a granddaughter of John I, King of Portugal.

Shortly after 1470, Anne acquired Hof van Leffinge (Leffinge House) in Molenmeers, renaming it Hof van Ravenstein (Ravenstein House), a palace that she kept at least until 1501 and possibly until her death. In 1475, Adolph became stadtholder-general (steward) of the Low Countries, and in 1483, he was appointed a member of the regency council which governed during the minority of Philip IV, Duke of Burgundy ("Philip the Handsome"; 1478–1506). Anne worked on land reclamation in Zeeland, giving her name to a polder known as Sint-Annaland in 1476. By 1486, she had had a new church built and by 1487, a second polder, Sint Philipsland. She was widowed for a second time in 1492. In 1498 she transferred Sint-Annaland, Hannevosdijk and Moggershil to her half-brother Baudouin of Burgundy, Lord of Fallais (1446–1508), another illegitimate child of Philip the Good.

Anne died on 14 January 1508. Her body was buried next to her second husband's in the Dominican church in Brussels, which has since been demolished. Her heart was placed in the church of West-Souburg with the body of her first spouse. The castle in West-Souburg and the Zeeland polders were inherited by her (also illegitimate) half-brother, Philip of Burgundy (1464–1524), a priest and Admiral of Flanders. Another one of her siblings, Baudouin, who had already received some lands from her while she was alive, inherited Hof van Leffinge.

== Sources ==
- Vaughan, Richard (2002). Philip the Good: The Apogee of Burgundy. Vol. 3. Boydell Press. ISBN 9780851159171.
