= Anne of Burgundy (disambiguation) =

Anne of Burgundy was a daughter of John the Fearless, Duke of Burgundy, and Duchess of Bedford by marriage.

Anne of Burgundy may also refer to:

Anne of Burgundy, Lady of Ravenstein (c. 1435–1508), illegitimate daughter of Philip the Good, Duke of Burgundy, and governess of Mary, Duchess of Burgundy.

Anne of Burgundy, Countess of Savoy (also called Margaret; 1192–1243), daughter of Hugh III of Burgundy and Countess of Savoy by marriage to Amadeus IV of Savoy.

== See also ==
- Agnes of Burgundy (disambiguation)
- Princess Anne (disambiguation)
