= Sint-Annaland =

- Village
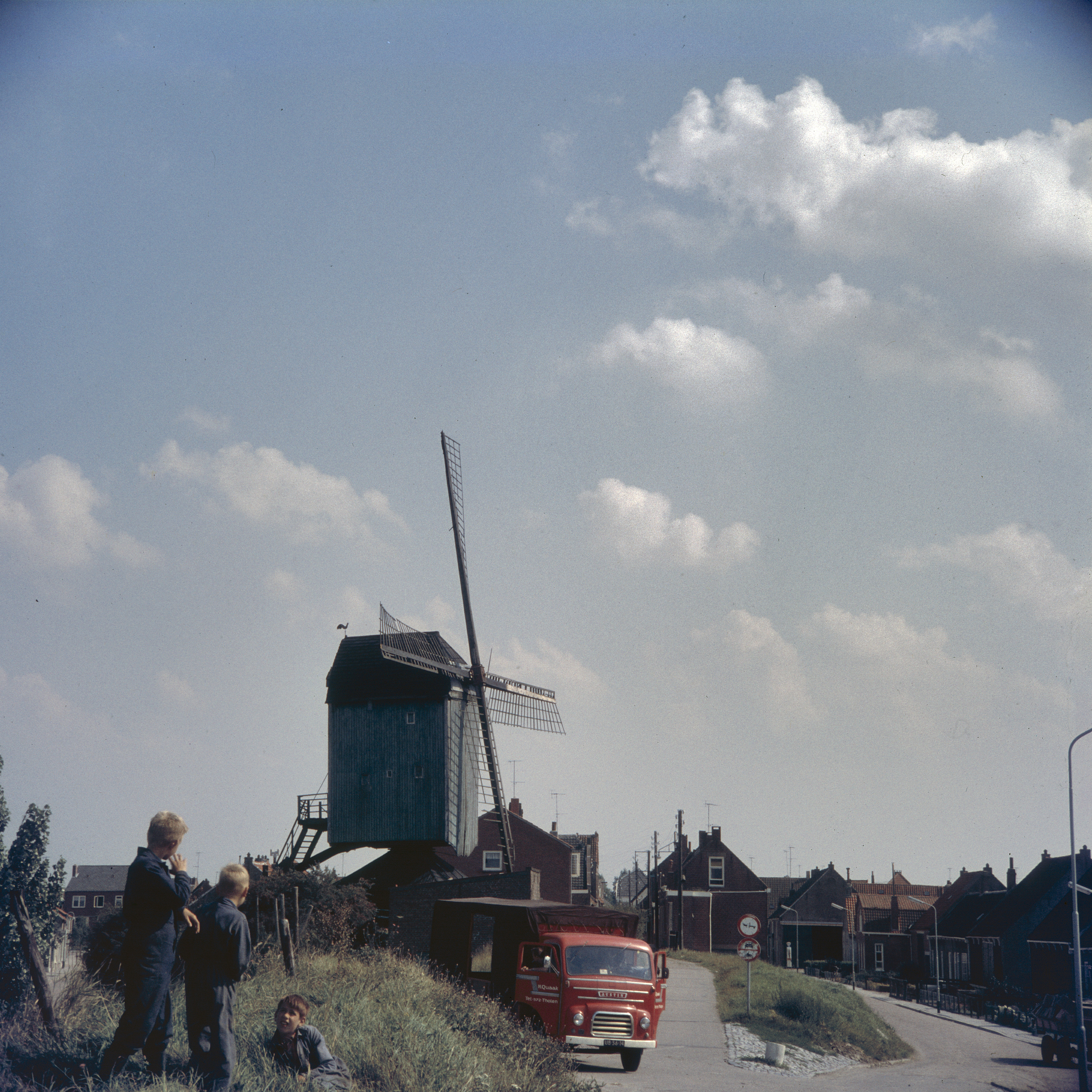
- View on Sint-Annaland

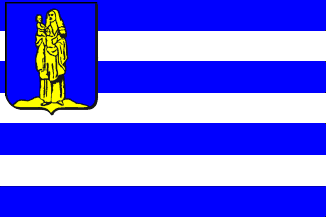
- Flag Coat of arms

- Location in the province of Zeeland in the Netherlands Sint-Annaland (Netherlands)
- Coordinates: 51°35′59″N 4°6′10″E
- Country: Netherlands
- Province: Zeeland
- Municipality: Tholen

Area
  - Total: 14.29 km^{2} (5.52 sq mi)
- Elevation: 0.7 m (2.3 ft)

Population (2021)
  - Total: 3,785
  - Density: 264.9/km^{2} (686.0/sq mi)
- Time zone: UTC+1 (CET)
  - Summer (DST): UTC+2 (CEST)
- Postal code: 4697
- Dialing code: 0166

Sint-Annaland is a village in the Dutch province of Zeeland. It is part of the municipality of Tholen, and lies about 18 km northwest of Bergen op Zoom.

== History ==
The village was first mentioned in 1493 as Sint Annenlant, and is named after Saint Anne, the patron saint of Anna van Bourgondië who ordered the poldering of the land. Sint Annaland developed after the salt marshes of the Oudelandpolder were diked in 1476. In 1668, the Suzannapolder, named after the daughter of Constantijn Huygens, was reclaimed and a harbour was added to the village.

The Dutch Reformed church was built in 1899 as a cruciform church and features a tower with a wooden lantern. It replaced the earlier church from 1494. The nameless grist mill of Sint-Annaland was built around 1684, and is the oldest extant windmill in Zeeland. It was in service until 1960 and was purchased by the municipality in 1966. It was restored the same year, but several mistakes were made during the reconstruction. Between 2005 and 2006, it was restored again and the mistakes were corrected. The wind mill is in service on a voluntary basis.

Since 1899, there is a potato auction in Sint-Annaland. It is the only remaining potato auction of the Netherlands and functions as a Dutch auction where the buyers have to watch the clock and the potatoes are sold to whoever presses the button first. It is open for tourists on Wednesdays.

Sint-Annaland was home to 1,792 people in 1840. The village was affected by the North Sea flood of 1953. In 1960, the old harbour was filled in and a new harbour was constructed to the north of the village.

Sint-Annaland was a separate municipality until 1971, when it was merged with Tholen.

== Gallery ==
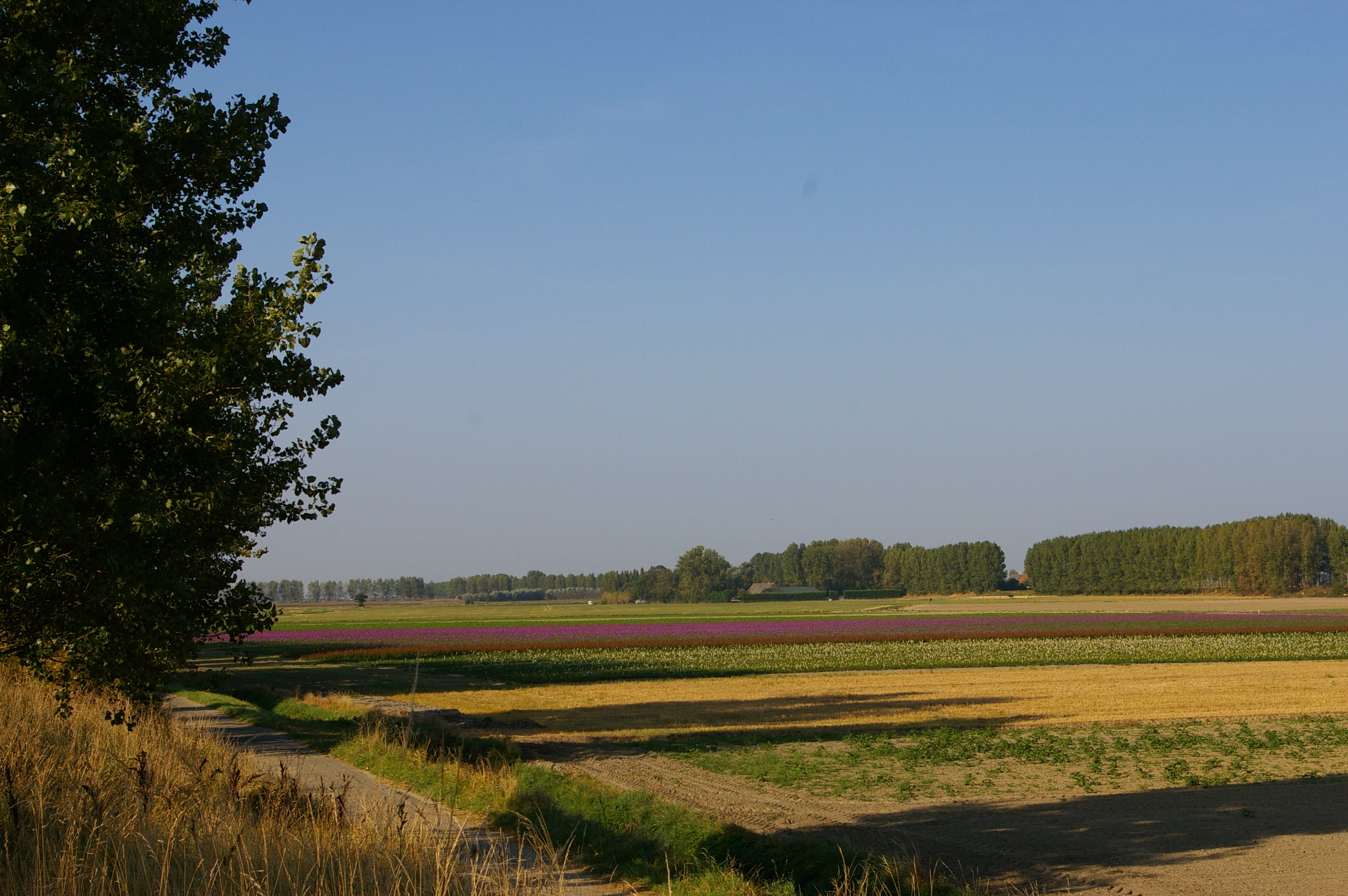
Landscape near Sint Annaland

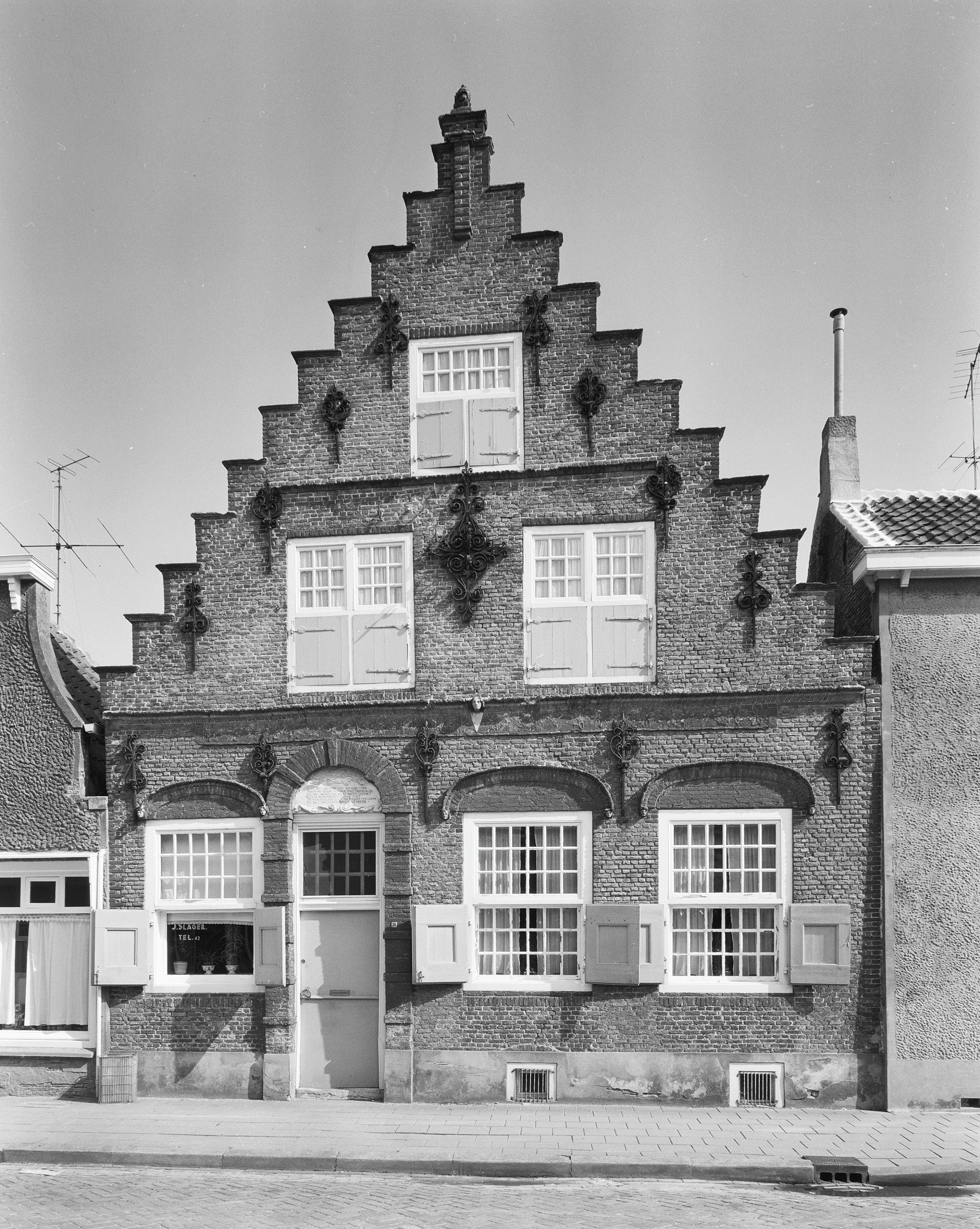
Former town hall (1966)
