= Oost- en West-Souburg =

Oost- en West-Souburg is a former municipality in the Dutch province of Zeeland. It existed between 1835 and 1966, when it was merged with Vlissingen.

The municipality included the villages of Oost-Souburg and West-Souburg.
