= Kleverskerke =

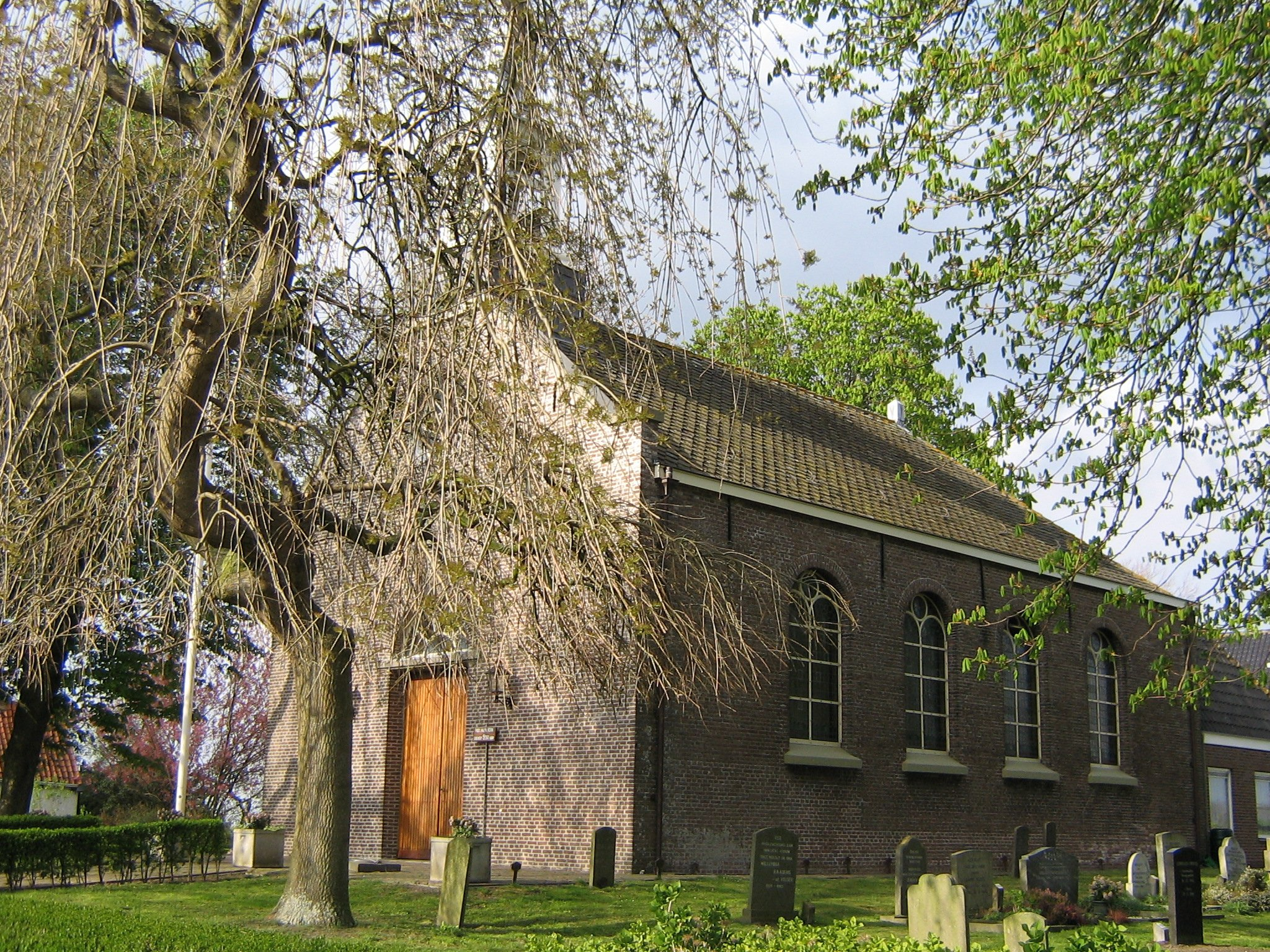

- Seal

- Location in the province of Zeeland in the Netherlands Kleverskerke (Netherlands)
- Coordinates: 51°31′N 3°40′E
- Country: Netherlands
- Province: Zeeland
- Municipality: Middelburg

Area
  - Total: 0.07 km^{2} (0.027 sq mi)
- Elevation: 2.8 m (9.2 ft)

Population (2021)
  - Total: 60
  - Density: 860/km^{2} (2,200/sq mi)
- Time zone: UTC+1 (CET)
  - Summer (DST): UTC+2 (CEST)
- Postal code: 4341
- Dialing code: 0118

Kleverskerke is a small village in the Dutch province of Zeeland. It is located in the municipality of Middelburg, about 4 kilometres north-east of the city centre.

== History ==
The village was first mentioned in 1251 as Clawarskerke, and means "(private) church of Clawaert (person)". Kleverskerke used to be a free heerlijkheid (=no fief) and a castle was located near the village. Kleverskerke became an independent parish in 1251. The church dates from 1862.

Kleverskerke was home to 194 people in 1840. Kleverskerke was a separate municipality until 1857, when it was merged with Arnemuiden. In 1997, it became part of the municipality of Middelburg.

== Gallery ==
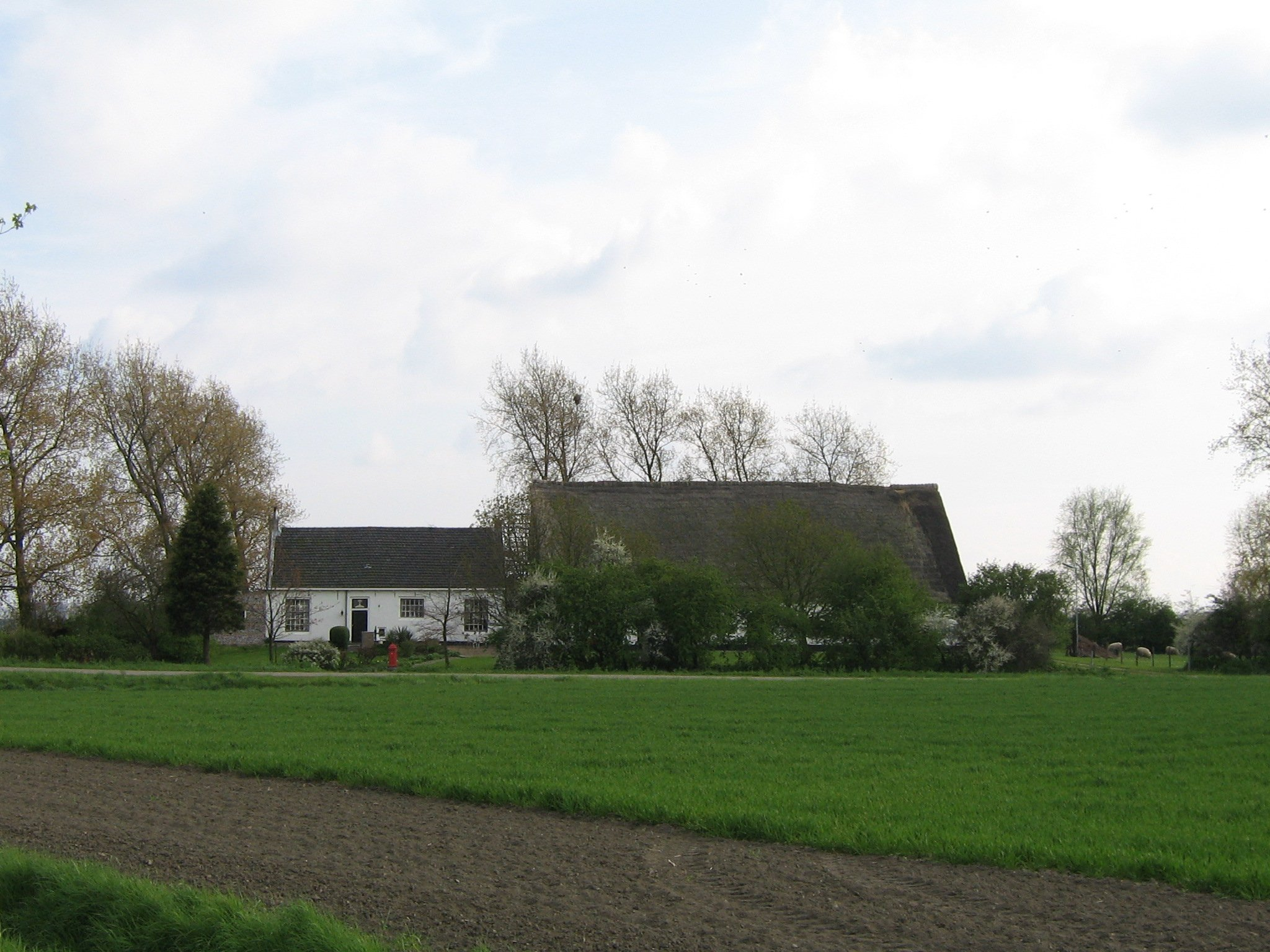
Farm in Kleverskerke

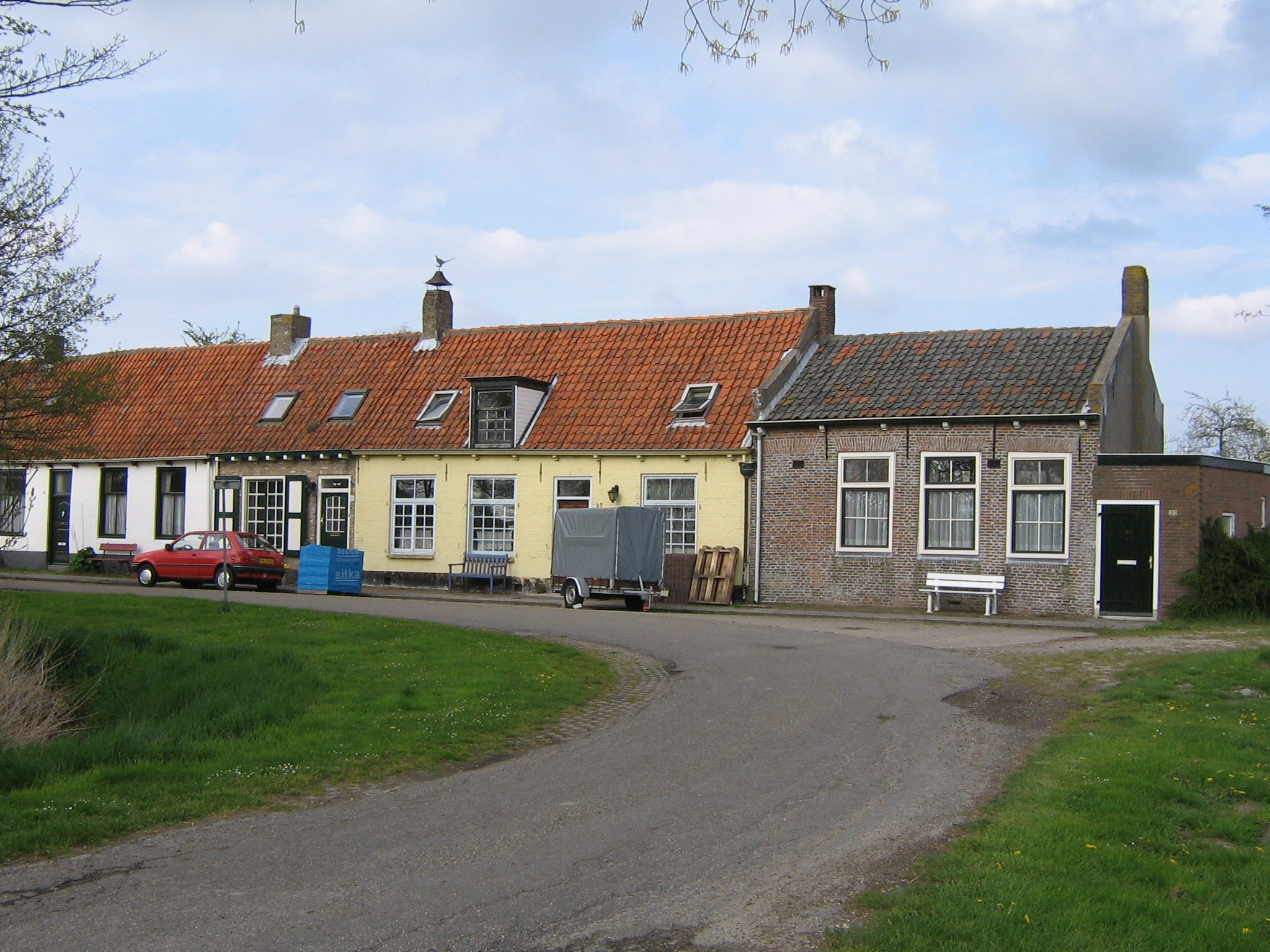
Village street
