= Agnes of Burgundy =

Agnes of Burgundy may refer to:

- Agnes of Burgundy, Duchess of Aquitaine (died 1068)
- Agnes of France, Duchess of Burgundy (c. 1260–1327)
- Agnes of Burgundy, Duchess of Bourbon (1407–1476)
