= Oost-Souburg =

- Town
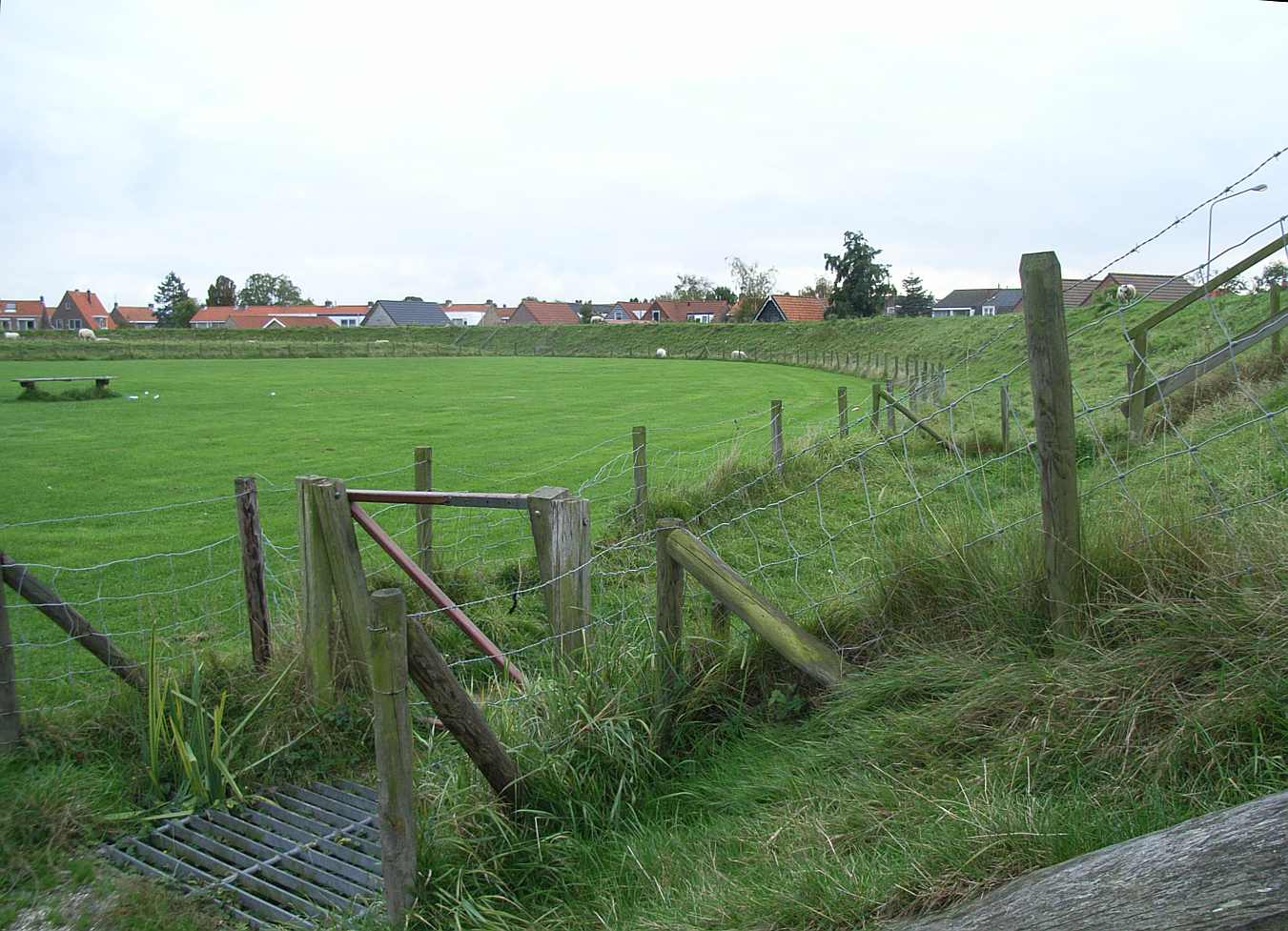
- Ringwall in Oost-Souburg

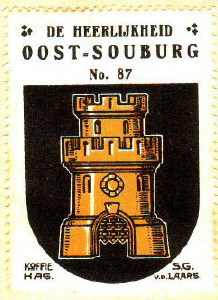
- Coat of arms

- Location in the province of Zeeland in the Netherlands Oost-Souburg (Netherlands)
- Coordinates: 51°27′49″N 3°36′3″E
- Country: Netherlands
- Province: Zeeland
- Municipality: Vlissingen

Area
  - Total: 2.87 km^{2} (1.11 sq mi)
- Elevation: 0.1 m (0.33 ft)

Population (2021)
  - Total: 10,145
  - Density: 3,530/km^{2} (9,160/sq mi)
- Time zone: UTC+1 (CET)
  - Summer (DST): UTC+2 (CEST)
- Postal code: 4388
- Dialing code: 0118

Oost-Souburg is a town in the municipality of Vlissingen in the province of Zeeland, Netherlands.

== History ==
The village was first mentioned in 1162 as Sutburch, and used to mean "southern fortified place", because it was the most southern of three defensive structures to defend against the Vikings. Oost (east) was added later to distinguish from West-Souburg. Oost-Souburg developed around the 9th century walled fortification. The fortification was abandoned in the 10th century.

The tower of the Dutch Reformed church was built in the early-14th century. The nave was built in the 15th century. It was damaged during the Dutch Revolt in 1572 and restored between 1582 and 1583. The choir was demolished during the restoration. The tower was enlarged in the 19th century.

Oost-Souburg was a separate municipality until 1836, when it merged with West-Souburg to create the new municipality of Oost- en West-Souburg. In 1840, it was home to 469 people. In 1873, the Canal through Walcheren was dug and the town was split into Oost- and West-Souburg.

In 1966, the town became part of the municipality of Vlissingen.

== Notable people ==
Oost-Souburg is the birthplace of former Ajax en Dutch international football-player Danny Blind.

== Transport ==
In 1872, a railway station opened on the Vlissingen to Roosendaal railway line. It closed in 1945. In 1986, a new station opened which was named Vlissingen-Souburg.

== Gallery ==
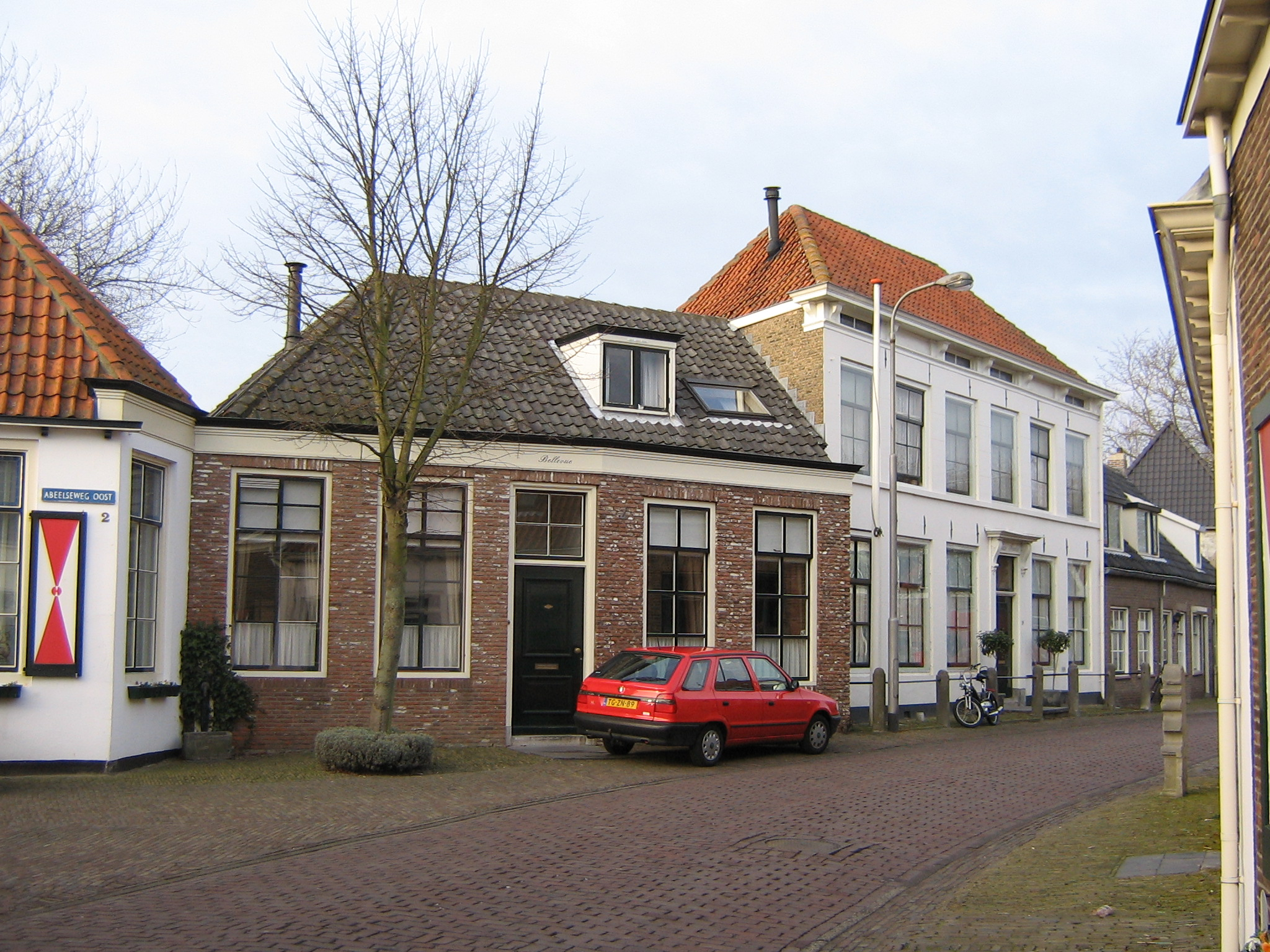
Building in Oost-Souburg

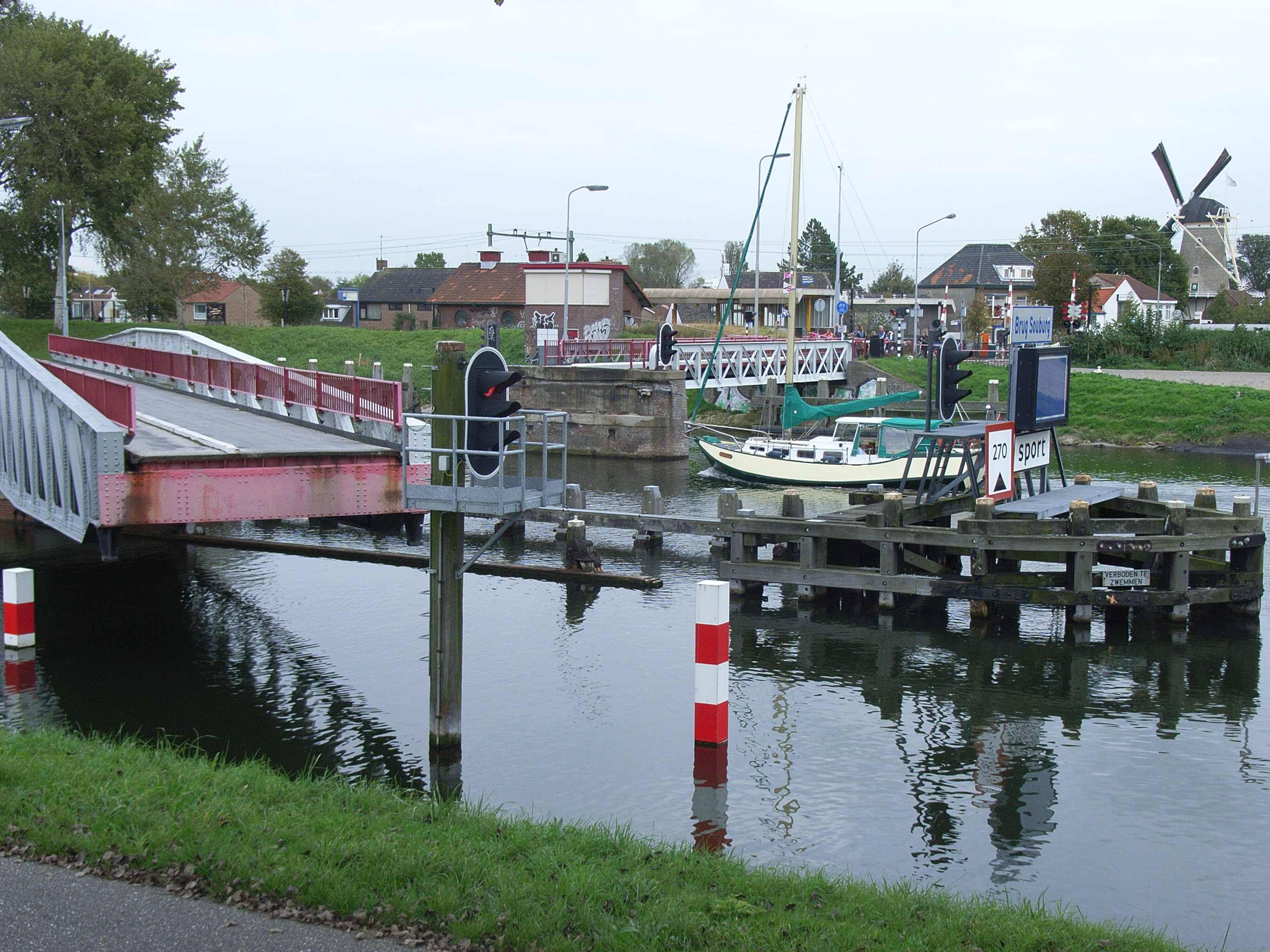
Bridge in Oost-Souburg

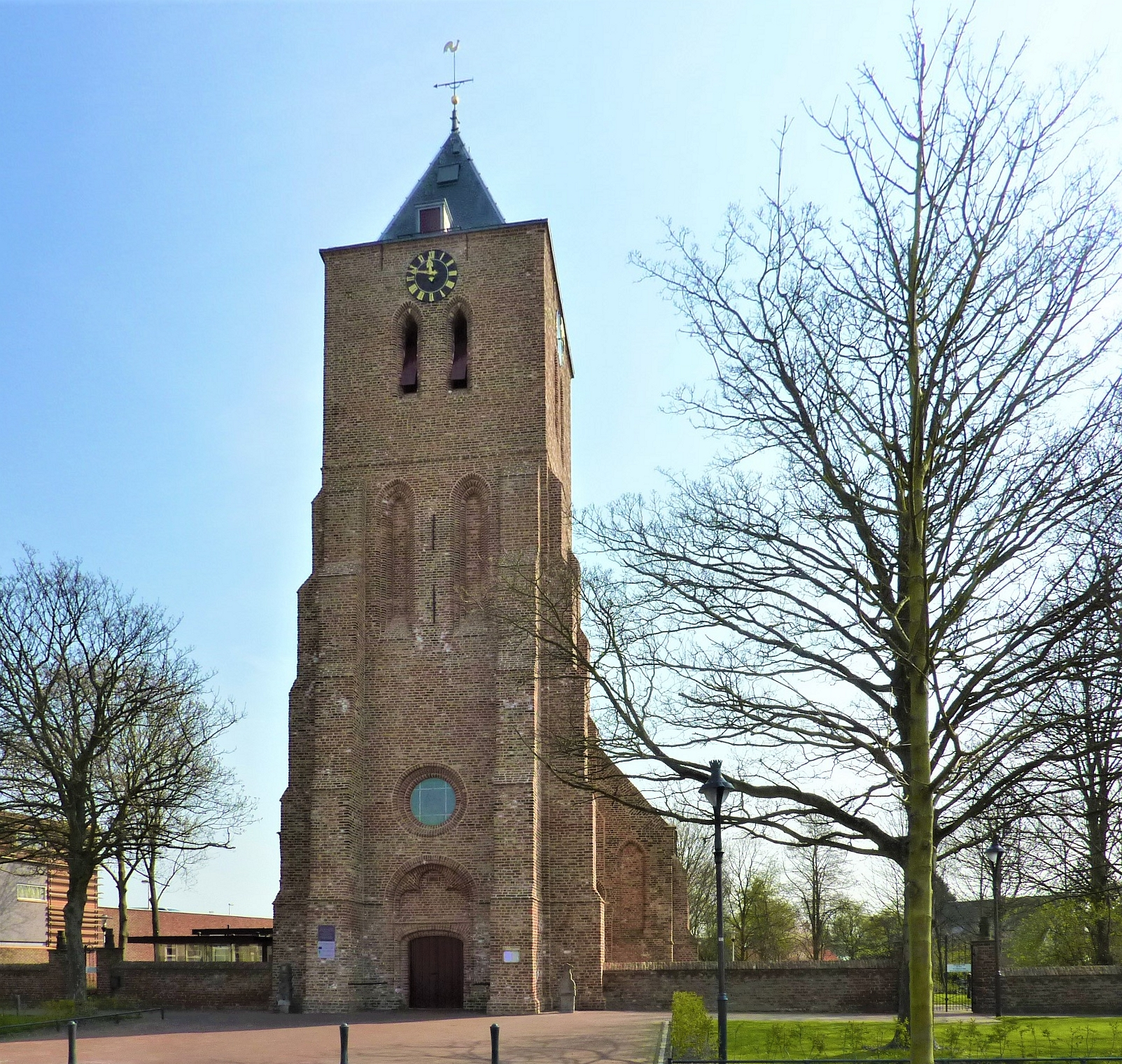
Church Open Haven

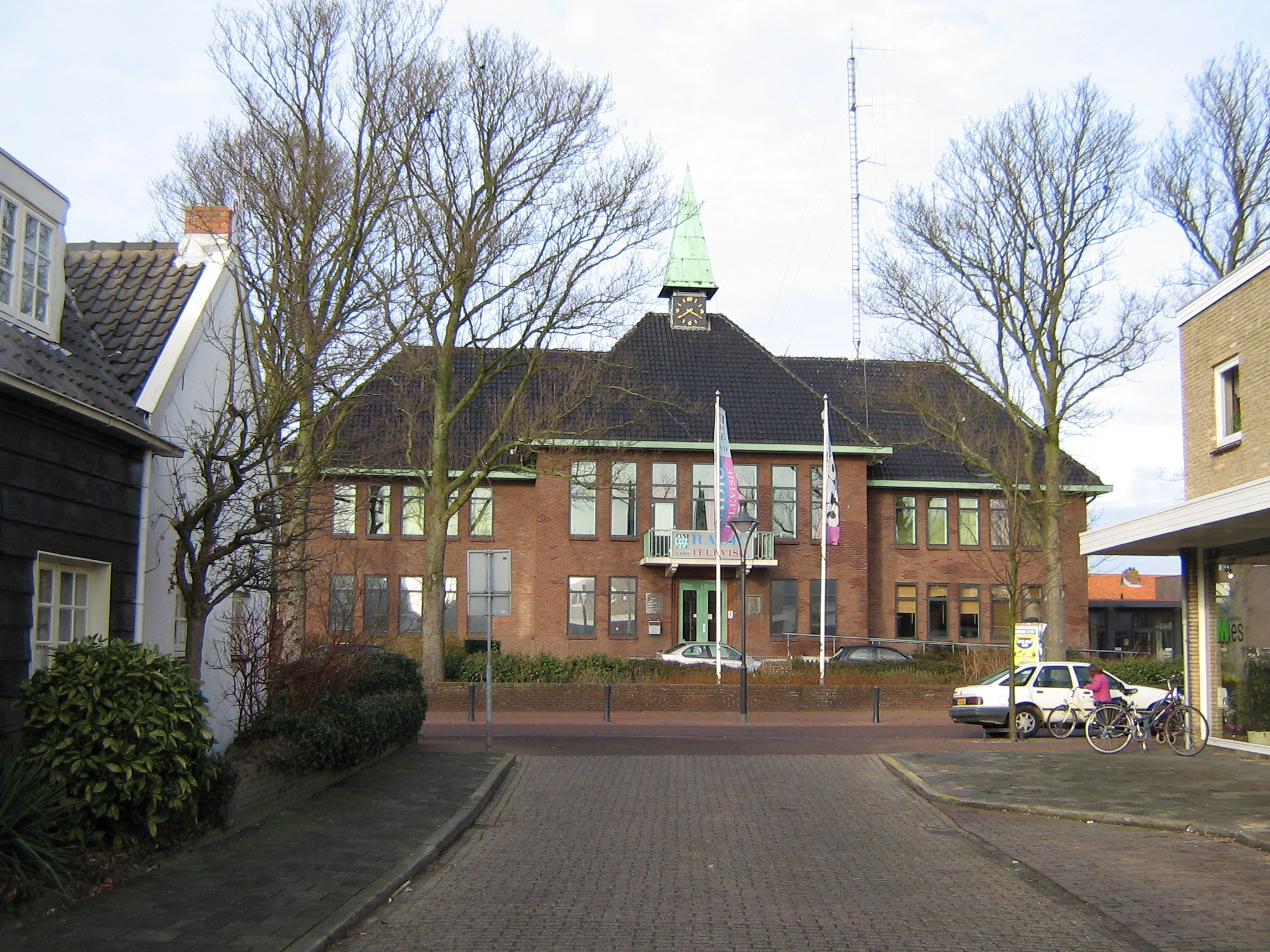
Omroep Zeeland broadcasting station
