= West-Souburg =

- Neighbourhood and former village
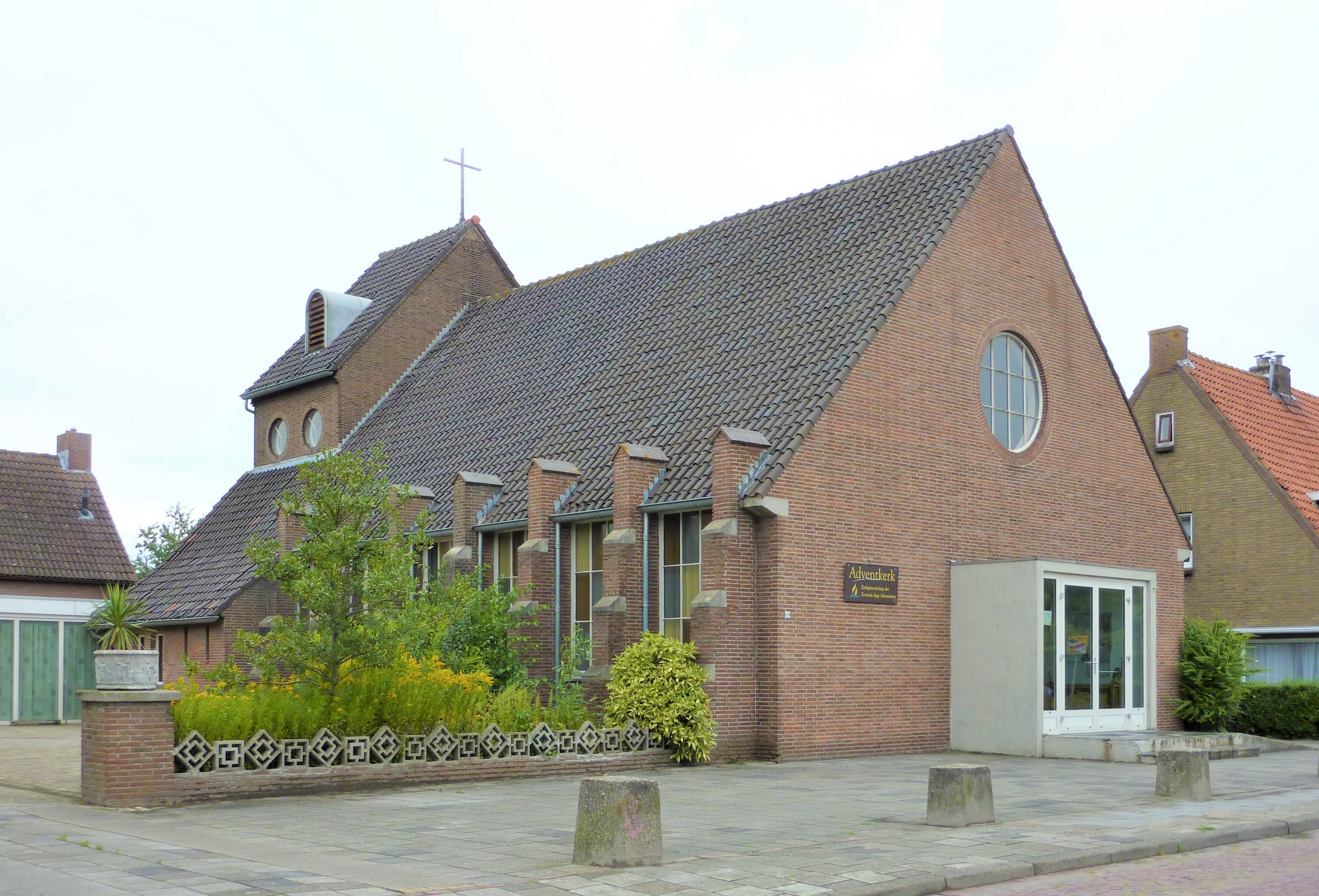
- Sint Martinus Church

- Coat of arms

- Location in the province of Zeeland in the Netherlands West-Souburg (Netherlands)
- Coordinates: 51°27′54″N 3°35′27″E
- Country: Netherlands
- Province: Zeeland
- Municipality: Vlissingen

Area
  - Total: 0.69 km^{2} (0.27 sq mi)
- Elevation: 2.2 m (7.2 ft)

Population (2021)
  - Total: 1,960
  - Density: 2,800/km^{2} (7,400/sq mi)
- Time zone: UTC+1 (CET)
  - Summer (DST): UTC+2 (CEST)
- Postal code: 4386
- Dialing code: 0118

West-Souburg is a neighbourhood of Vlissingen and former village in the Dutch province of Zeeland. It is part of the municipality of Vlissingen, and has been annexed by the city.

The village was first mentioned in 1162 as Sutburch, and used to mean "southern fortified place", because it was the most southern of three defensive structures to defend against the Vikings. West was added later to distinguish from Oost-Souburg. In 1873, the Canal through Walcheren was dug and the town was split into Oost- and West-Souburg.

West-Souburg was home to 357 people in 1840. It was an independent municipality until 1835, when it was merged with Oost-Souburg to create the municipality of Oost- en West-Souburg which merged with Vlissingen in 1966. In 2012, place name signs with West-Souburg were returned after much lobbying.

== Gallery ==
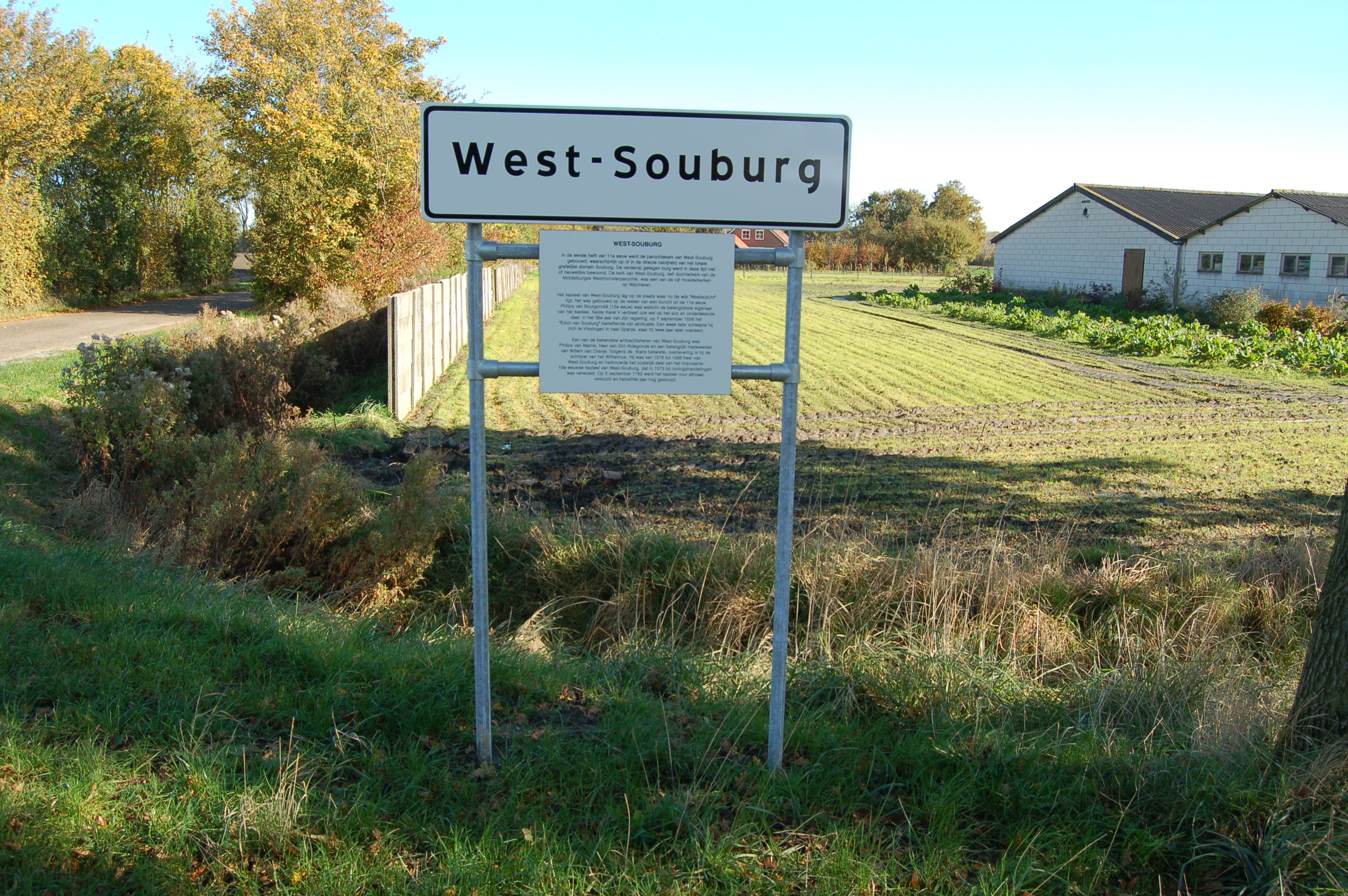
Place name sign (white to indicate that Vlissingen considers it a neighbourhood)

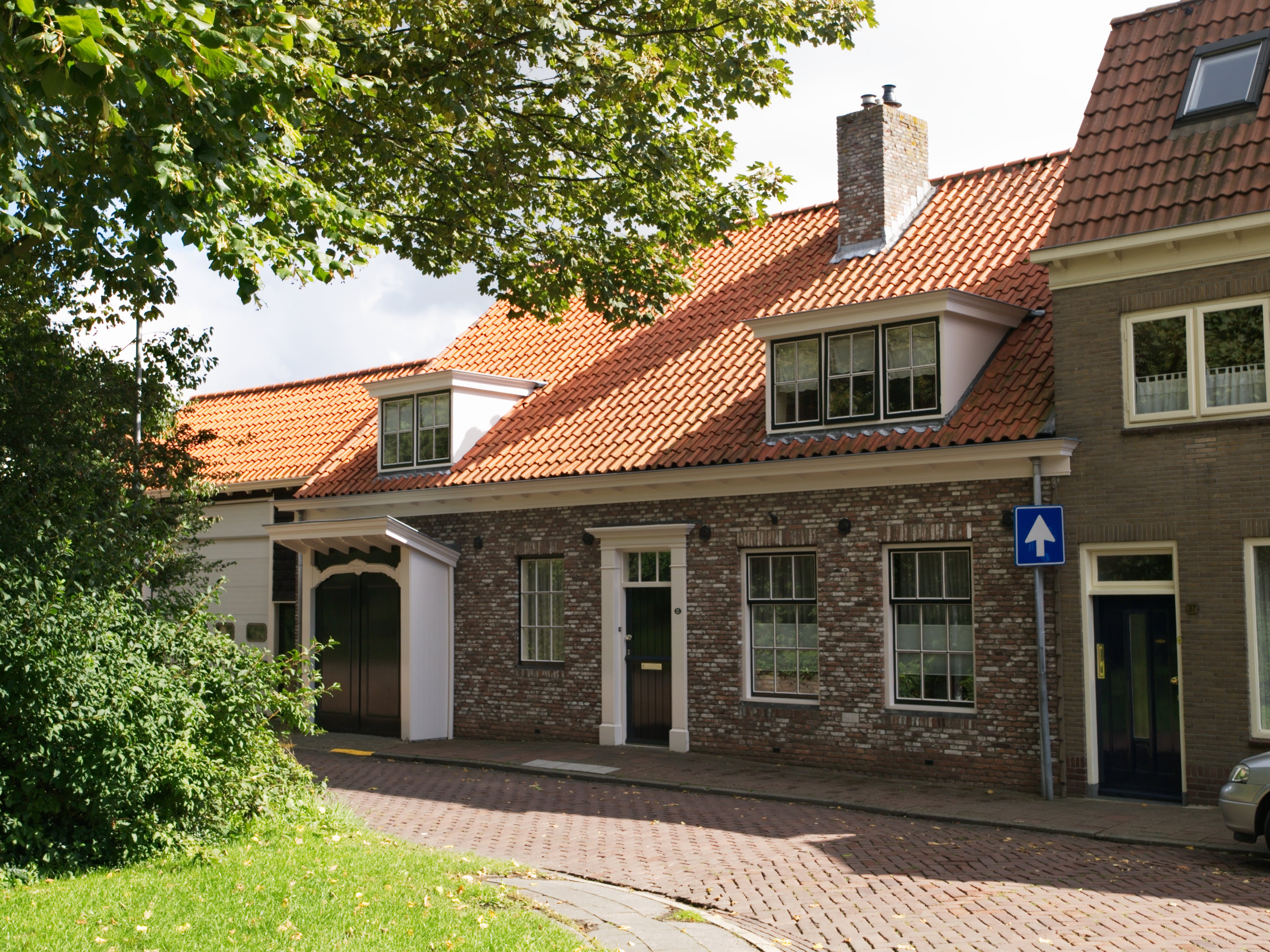
House in West-Souburg

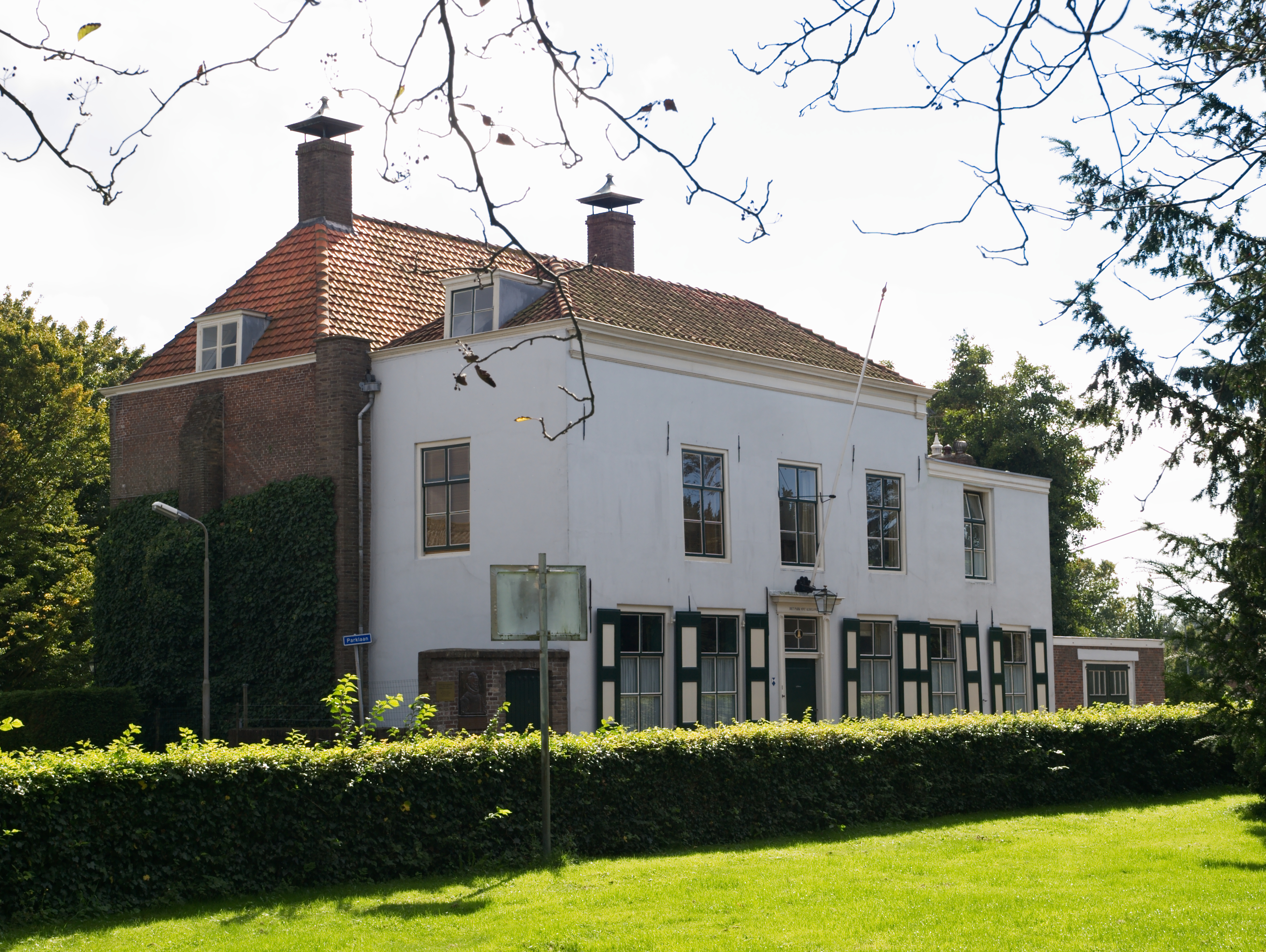
Villa in West-Souburg
