= List of settlements lost to floods in the Netherlands =

Numerous settlements lost to sea enroachment in the Netherlands are listed

This list of settlements lost to floods in the Netherlands is an adapted translation of this list from Dutch, plus some additions from other sources.

"Oud-" is Dutch for "Old". If you cannot find a name, look for it under "Oud-".

== Drowned villages and places in Zeeland and West-Brabant ==
Name	Description
Aandijke (also Aendike)	Drowned village in Zeelandic Flanders. On the former island of Zaamslag.
Assenburg	Small village on the former island Borssele. It drowned during the storm floods of 1530 and 1532.
Avenkerke (also Brielle)	One of the 4 drowned villages on the island Wulpen. This island was in the Middle Ages off the coast of Zeelandic Flanders. North of Wulpen was the island Koezand. Northwest was the island Schooneveld. Around 1570 Wulpen island went under. The last remains vanished by the end of the 17th century.
Baarzande (also Bardesant, Burdasanda or Bersant)	Northeast of the former island Cadzand. Drowned about 1500.
Bakendorp (also Badickedorp)	Village south of Baarland. The storm flood of November 1530 destroyed Bakendorp. After re-diking it gradually vanished through dike collapses in the Westerschelde. A memory of Bakendorp is the gravestone of pastor Jan Lenaerts who died on 28 April 1518; that stone is now in the church of Hoedekenskerke. Until the 19th century there was by Bakendorp a ferry to Zeelandic Flanders. The remains of Bakendorp could until 1957 be found in the landscape. Afterwards a radical redistribution of multiple allotments of land completed the work of the water and the last remains of Bakendorp vanished.
Beoostenblije	Settlement near Axel. During the conquest of Axel by Prince Maurits in 1586 its inhabitants had to escape. They never came back.
Borrendamme	South of Zierikzee. Appears in 1297 for the first time in records. The storm floods of 1530 and 1532 nearly destroyed the village. In 1570 and in 1610 remains of the village were used to stop breaches in the southern dike of Schouwen-Duiveland. The foundations of the church remained visible up to 1822. The church lay 800 meters west of the mole of Zierikzee.
Boterzande	Drowned coastal village in Zeelandic Flanders north of Biervliet. Occurs in 990 in the files of Saint Peter's Abbey in Ghent. In 992 a farm with associated ground in "Boltreshanda" was given to the abbey. There must have lain there outside the dike considerable mud flat, which is listed in records as "outdike". Boterzande disappeared on 8 October 1375 in the waves of what now is called the Westerschelde.
Capelle	Capelle near Zierikzee shares with Schuring in the Hoekse Waard the doubtful honour of being the most recently drowned village of the delta. Until 1 February 1953 Capelle was between Zierikzee and Nieuwerkerk. It was a sturdy hamlet, a street with a row of houses on both sides and a crossing point. The North Sea flood of 1953 swept Capelle away and it was not rebuilt. In the area around is only farmland.
Coxyde (also Beniardskerke, Bingaerstkerke, Bengerskerke)	Village near Oostburg. It belonged to St. Baaf's Abbey at Ghent. It suffered so much from floods. In 1583 Prince Maurits flooded the area around Sluis to block the march of the Spanish commander Parma. The dikes by Coxyde were broken. The current scoured gullies out and sucked Coxyde away into the deep.
De Piet (also Mude, Muiden)	The name means swimming and sunbathing, for De Piet is now above all known as a recreation area at the south corner of the Veerse Meer. Neat cultivation, neat creek and beach. The landscape there ever offers another bright panorama. But 700 years ago here on the western part of the former island of Wolphaartsdijk was the village of De Piet. The outline of the village was shown by the castle of Muiden. The village went under in 1377. The ruin of the castle stood long as a landmark in the Veerse Gat.
Elmare	Drowned village in the frontier region of the present-day Zeelandic Flanders and Belgium. Drowned in 1375. The village lay rather alone in an extensive wild peat bog region south of IJzendijke. Graaf Diederik of the Elzas gave in 1134 and 1135 20 bunder (an area unit) of peat ground to St. Peter's Abbey in Ghent. The 20 bunder, 20 hectare, ground lay by a small stream called the Helmare. There was potential fuel, for there peat could be dug out. The monks built there a chapel to the honour of the Virgin Mary, a church dedicated to St. Nicholas, and also a mill. There was a monastery with monks who were linked with the mother abbey in Ghent. They controlled the village. The inhabitants were serfs, but rather property of the monks. Under their leading they brought the surrounding wild ground into cultivation. Elmare became through a way linked with the area around, likewise the drowned Oostmanskerke. Elmare is above all known through a famous fairy story: the village was called repeatedly in the Dutch version of the old animal epic "Reynard the Fox".
Emersweert	No information
Everswaard (also Eversweerde)	Drowned village and parish north of Bath. The parish belonged to the bishopric of Utrecht. The church's patron saint was St. John the Evangelist. It vanished during the storm flood of 1530.
Ganuenta	Drowned Roman settlement in the Oosterschelde in front of the coast of Colijnsplaat.
Gaternesse (also Gathernesse, Gaternisse)	Village north of IJzendijke. It existed in 1150. It had an extensive ground area. One of its pastors was Wouter Everard, a dynamic entrepreneur, and likely vain. In 1357 he had a polder endiked and named it after himself. The Everardpolder was not allotted long life. Already the same year the dike broke and ran the fresh land reclamation under water. The village Gaternesse went under during storm floods in the 15th century. In 1660 inhabitants of IJzendijke saw for the last time the foundations of Gaternesse.
Hannekenswerve	Drowned village between Sluis and Aardenburg in Zeelandic Flanders. A considerable village and there lived tidy religious people. In 1169 bishop Walter of Doornik approved that the pastor of Aardenburg and the curate of Hannekenswerve made mutual agreements over their service roster. Until then the pastor of Aardenburg did the weddings, baptisms and burials of the village. Now the curate, with special powers, could do these himself. Quid pro quo? The man had to give a third of his income to the head church in Aardenburg. Excavations in 1964 unearthed the remains of the church, painted crypts and tombstones. In 1421 the region about Hannekenswerve went under water. In 1477 followed a flood. During the Eighty Years' War, in 1583, the inhabitants of Sluis broke the dikes through. A text of 1666 says: "the place where formerly Hannekenswerve was, is flat". The village had vanished from the map through nature and war violence. Approximately on the place of Hannekenswerve now lies Draaibrug.
Roeselare	A small town near Aardenburg. It was described in 1404 as "lost to the endless days of the sea".
Hinkelenoord	Drowned village northwest of Woensdrecht. It drowned during the storm flood of 1552
Hugevlet	A town northwest of Biervliet in Zeelandic Flanders. Lodewijk van Male, count of Flanders, gave Hugevlet town rights in the 13th century. The settlement existed in 1174. Hugevlet had its own weekly and yearly market, and its own harbour on the Westerschelde. In spite of privileges it never got the chance to become a proper town. In 1375/1376 the Westerschelde did a first attack on Hugevlet. It failed. In 1404 it was successful. Hugevlet vanished for all time in the waves.
Kadzand	Island and settlement in the mouth of the Westerschelde. It was one of the many islands which in the Middle Ages were in the mouth of the Westerschelde. It flooded in 1375. Kadzand was later attached to Zeelandic Flanders by diking. The settlement vanished.
Kalfsteert	Hamlet by Perkpolder. In the 16th century a ferry went from Kalfsteert to Waarde. The Nieuhoespolder where Kalfsteert lay, vanished in 1591 in the Westerschelde.
Koezand	Island in the mouth of the Westerschelde. In the spring of 1344 the dike-builders arrived on the mudflats of Koezand. The endiking happened by instigation of 4 private investors. Amongst them was an official of the town of Bruges. The height of the dike was 10 feet, somewhat more than 3 meter. The width at top was 7 foot, somewhat more than two meter. The charter describing the endiking of Koezand is, as far as is known, the first written piece which described the measurements of sea dikes. Also the organisation of the polder governing board was regulated in details. In the first years there were 28 tenants on Koezand. They did not prosper. Floods did all during the first years and much land was lost. Afterwards followed a hard fight to save the island. In 1276 the tenants could no more produce the costs of the dike. The rent value was halved. A sea arm called the Hedensee separated the islands Koezand and Wulpen from each other. After the island flooded it was attached to the island of Wulpen by diking. It vanished in the waves during the All Saints' Flood (Allerheiligenvloed) of 1570.
Mare	Drowned village northwest of Rilland. It lay approximately on the site of the present-day Stationsbuurt. The village dates from the 13th century. Its name is first known from about 1280. The village drowned on Saturday 5 November 1530.
Michielsdorp	No information
Moggershil	Drowned settlement on a small island at the west of Tholen. It was lost in 1570.
Monster	Vanished village on the former island Borssele. The name Monster came from "Monasterium", which is Latin for "monastery". It drowned during the storm floods of 1530 and 1532. The area has been re-empoldered since, and the modern village of Borssele is approximately on its site. (Distinguish from the village called Monster in the South Holland province.)
Nieuwkapelle	Drowned village at the mouth of the Hinkelinge at the south of Kruiningen. The village lay in the Middenhinkelingepolder, which was endiked in 1327. The village was lost by floods in the 17th century.
Nieuwerkerk	Drowned village in the west of Zeelandic Flanders. It was between Oostburg and Groede at the Nieuwerkerk creek. It existed in 1197. It was damaged by the Allerheiligenvloed in 1570. It was flooded deliberately during the Eighty Years' War, and that washed Nieuwerkerk from the Earth's surface.
Nieuwerkerke	Drowned village by Arnemuiden on Walcheren.
Nummer Zes	Hamlet by a drainage sluice in the neighbourhood of Hoofdplaat. Nummer Zes vanished in 1808 in the waves of the Westerschelde. Its name means "Number Six".
Onze Lief Vrouw aan Zee	Former hamlet by Renesse. It was lost because of the advancing sea and being buried by dunes.
Oostkerke	Drowned village on the former island of Borssele. It belonged to the bishopric of Utrecht. The village went under in 1530.
Oostmanskerke (also Ozemanskerke)	Drowned village southeast of Schoondijke in Zeelandic Flanders. Its church is mentioned in 1150. A sacred robe belonging to the church is mentioned in 1391.
Orisant	Island in the Oosterschelde. Empoldered in 1602, drowned in 1639. The village of Orisant was at the south corner of the island on the left bank of a dammed-off creek called the Vijsse.
Oud-Arnemuiden (2 uses)	The village Arnemuiden occurs comes for the first in written sources in 1223. According to a record of 1288, Floris V wanted to give town rights to the village, but that never happened. Because the current of the Arne always moved more to the west, the village became threatened, and about 1440 was swallowed by the water. For about 20 years there was a second Arnemuiden. That vanished in the water as well. In 1462 arose the third and definitive Arnemuiden.
Oudeman (also Waterland)	Drowned village in the Oudemanspolder by the former municipality of IJzendijke. Vanished about 1500.
Oud-Bath	Some kilometers east of the present-day Bath. It drowned in 1552.
Oud-Breskens	In 1510 the Groot-Breskenspolder was endiked. There between 1515 and 1585 a settlement centre grew about a church dedicated to St. Barbara. In 1585 the first Breskens drowned in a flood caused by the inhabitants of the nearby Groede. In 1610 the present-day Breskens developed.
Oud-Domburg	Settlement somewhat west of the present-day Domburg. Also called Romeins Domburg. Buried under moving sand dunes and partly in the sea.
Oud-Graauw	In 1170 the village Graauw in Zeelandic Flanders was property of the abbey of Ter Duinen in Flanders. Vanished during floods in the 16th century. A new Graauw was built after the new Melopolder was made in 1682.
Oud-Kortgene	This town was found in archives first in 1247. The storm floods of 1530 and 1532 were too much for Oud-Kortgene. In 1684 the region was re-diked and the present-day Kortgene arose.
Oud-Othene	Small village east of Terneuzen. Mentioned first in 1160. The village went under in 1586.
Oud-Rilland	The abbey of Nijvel owned settlements in Rilland in 980. Until the 13th century Rilland was an island. By Rilland at the bank of the Westerschelde was a toll collection point. Rilland went under in 1530. In the 18th century the present-day Rilland was founded.
Oud-Schoondijke	In the west of Zeelandic Flanders This village was mentioned first in 1246, as Sconendica. Between 1585 and 1587 this old Schoondijke through war operations came under water. The village would have been where the old churchyard is by the present-day Schoondijke, which was founded in 1652 with a strict geometric groundplan.
Oud-Stavenisse	The parish Stavenisse was named in 1223. The church was dedicated to St. Martin. In 1304 Stavenisse was flooded. After re-diking the village vanished in 1509 again in the waves. This lasted until 1599 when a new inpoldering took place, and the present-day Stavenisse, entirely planned, was founded, at the west corner of Tholen. This new Stavenisse is a Voorstraat village. Also in similar villages in Zeeland and West-Brabant the Voorstraat runs from the church to the harbour.
Oud-Westkapelle	Drowned trading settlement which was submerged due to damage to the banks. In 1696 M. Smallegange wrote that the old Westkapelle had been in the sea for "several centuries" and that men "catch fish there daily". Historians say that the old Westkapelle flooded in 1368 and 1377. Its church had to be demolished in 1458 because the sea approached it foundations. By Westkapelle men found in 1514 an altar dedicated both to the Germanic god Magusanus and to the Roman god Hercules.
Remboudsdorpe	One of the 4 drowned villages of the quite densely populated island of Wulpen. Lost in 1345.
Risinge	Hamlet on the former island of Borssele. Drowned during the storm floods of 1530 and 1532.
Rodee	The hamlet lay some hundreds of meters west of the harbour mole of Zierikzee. The last dwellings of Rodee were demolished in 1642. Shortly afterwards the water of the Oosterschelde closed above this small village.
Runckendorp	No information
Ruschevlet (also Rusgefleta, Ruschflite)	Vanished and drowned village southwest of Schoondijke. Around 1150 the small river Rusgefleta flowed in western Zeelandic Flanders in the region between Schoondijk and Oostburg. In those years the abbey of St. Peter at Ghent bought land along the Rusgefleta. It went around agricultural land and around fen land. The abbey organised there the church's governing board in a (proosdij?).
Schoneveld (Sconeveld)	In the mouth of the Westerschelde in the Middle Ages were some islands. One of them was Schoneveld. When Gwijde of Dampierre was count of Flanders, 1278–1305, there must have been a small village and even a country seat there. The storm flood of 1375 broke the dikes of Schoneveld. It flooded, and is not mentioned in source documents afterwards. The sandbank which is now on the place of the island, is still called the Schoneveldbank.
St. Catharina (also St. Cathelijne)	Drowned village by the present-day Oostburg, on the south side of the water that we now know as the Grote Gat. St. Peter's Abbey at Ghent owned a taxation right there. During the storm flood of 1375/1376 the village vanished under water. After repairs the village and the church were rebuilt in about 1400. The village vanished in 1583. The region where the village is, is now the Cathalijnepolder. In 1962 during building activities remains of the church and of houses were found in the ground.
St. Christoffelskapelle	Small settlement in the Yevenpolder in Zeelandic Flanders, in the neighbourhood of Gaternesse. The Yevenpolder drowned at the end of the 16th century; then St. Christoffelskapelle also vanished.
St. Janscapelle	The village of St. Janscapelle was in about 1300 west of Sas van Gent. Excavations in 1979 showed that a prosperous community had been there. It vanished through flood in 1488.
St. Katherijnekerke	Drowned village and parish on the former island of Borssele. The church stood there before 1275. The storm floods of 1530 and 1532 meant the loss of St. Katherijnekerke.
St. Kruispolder	Drowned parish village by Aardenburg. It went under the water in 1375/1376.
St. Lambert-Wulpen	Village on the island of Wulpen, which was in front of the coast of Zeelandic Flanders and had 4 villages. It had its own hospital. In 1292 it was listed as "Sancte Marie in Wlpis." Wulpen was constantly threatened by storms and floods. In 1516 St. Lambert-Wulpen was the last village of the island that was devastated by the sea.
St. Nicolaas in Varne (Vaerne or Langaardenburg)	A little place in the frontier region of Zeelandic Flanders and Belgium. In 1252 it even had its own "ship bank". Its inhabitants must have thought that they lived in the front porch of Hell. Their village lay southwest of IJzendijke in Zeelandic Flanders. It was a morass-ridden desolate wild region, the end of the land, though many saw it as the beginning of the underworld. Some say that "Varne" came from "Avernus", a lake in Italy where by tradition the underworld began. Other sources hold simply that "varne" came from "varnte", an old word for "weeds". Anyway, the village with the beautiful name drowned in 1377 and left nothing behind except a name in official documents.
Slepeldamme	Hamlet on former harbour mole of Aardenburg. There was a sluice. Also there was a toll office for the shipping from and to Aardenburg. Via Slepeldamme much cattle and grain was transported from Holland and Zeeland. In 1280 Slepeldamme promoted its toll office to Damme. The small village went through floods in 1583 and 1604 and was lost for good.
Stuivezand	Drowned village and parish south of Baarland. Stuivezand was endiked between 1370 and 1375 by instruction of Count Willem V of Holland. Because the gullies of the Westerschelde (which was then still called the Honte), more and more pressed against the Beveland wall, Stuivezand had many dike breaks. In 1525 the Dierik, a current gully between Stuivezand and the mainland of Zuid-Beveland, was dammed off. The inhabitants of Stuivezand could now go on foot to the land of Borssele and Baarland. They did, and most did not come back, certainly not after the floods of 1532, 1552 and 1570. Floods always made the island smaller. The last little piece of Stuivezand definitively vanished under water in the beginning of the 17th century.
Ter Hamer	Village between Biervliet and IJzendijke. The parish of Ter Hamer was mentioned for the first time in 1194. Much ground in the area round the village was property of Count Boudewijn IX of Flanders. He loved warmer regions, took part in the 4th Crusade, and became Emperor of Constantinople. On his return journey he was seized by the Bulgarians. His brother Hendrik succeeded him. He used the inhabitants of Ter Hamer as property insurance. Walter van Monnickenwerve and the brothers Jacob and Boudewijn van IJzendijke farmed by Ter Hamer. They had ground in fief there. However, with it came obligations. The inhabitants of Ter Hamer had to watch properties of lord Hendrik. In case of necessity they were obliged to march as an armed village militia. The village did not get its own jurisdiction in the form of a "ship-bank". The simple village Ter Hamer went under during the storm flood of 1375/1376.
Tewijk (also Tevewijc, Thevic, Tewic, Tevicambacht)	Drowned village on the former island of Borssele, north of the village of Monster, which is the present Borssele. Tewijk became a parish in 1275. Its church was dedicated to Johannes de Doper. Vestiges of Tewijk are found on the border of Borsselepolder and the Nieuw-Westkraaijertpolder.
Triniteit	Maria of Artois, the widow of count Jan of Namen, founded on 19 September 1336 the village of Triniteit south of Terneuzen. They promised to Jan van Diest, the bishop of Utrecht, that three quarters of the place's tax income would go to the pastor; one quarter was intended for the installation and maintenance of a hospital. The bishop approved. He wanted the church inaugurated, however. The noble Maria then wanted to supply a contribution to building the church. Her son Willem had also a demand: he wanted for himself and his followers by law of inheritance to be able to appoint pastors. The bishop did this without difficulty. On 21 January 1340 a substitute of the bishop presented to the church in Maria of Namen its first pastor: Johannes Boudweijnsz. The new parish got still a particular attraction: whoever visited the church, in devotion ran around the churchyard, and presented some alms to the church, could count on redemption of sins: an indulgence of 40 days. During the Eighty Years' War Triniteit was a battlefield zone. The village vanished in 1584 and 1585 by an army flooding it. The church stood there then still. The Catholics then lost all their authority there. Lieven Coenen became circa 1580 the first Protestant priest of Triniteit
Valkenisse	Southeast of Waarde. The church of Valkenisse was in 1233 dedicated and belonged to the chapter of Oudmunster at Utrecht. Valkenisse vanished in 1682 in the Westerschelde.
Vinninge	Drowned village south of Biezelinge in the Westerschelde, on the former island Baarland. Its church was dedicated to the Holy Mary. Vinkenisse was known in Rome, for in 1216 it was mentioned in a papal document. Vinninge apparently went under in the flood of 1530.
Vulendike (also Volendike)	no information
Waterdunen	One of the most mysterious small towns in Zeeland's history. It must have been on an island in the mouth of the Westerschelde, between the islands of Wulpen and Koezand, in front of the coast of the present-day Zeelandic Flanders. Old tax records show clearly that Waterdunen was of rather big scope. Waterdunen paid more tax than IJzendijke and Biervliet. According to the annals Waterdunen in 1357 was swallowed by the sea. Afterwards, after re-diking, a new parish was founded on the island. This second Waterdunen vanished at the end of the 15th century in the waves of the North Sea.
Weldamme	Small village by Zierikzee, after 1600 sunk in the Oosterschelde.
Westende	One of the 4 drowned villages on the island Wulpen, vanished about 1570.
Westkerke (1) (also Raaskerke)	Drowned village on the former island of Borssele. Westkerke went under during the storm flood of 1530. It is in the Westerschelde southwest of Borssele.
Westkerke (2)	Drowned village west of Oud-Sabbinge on the island Wolphaartsdijk that existed then. This Westkerke drowned on 16 November 1377. The region where the village lay, was re-endiked in 1665; the area was later named as the Westerlandpolder. In 1975 remains of Westkerke were found west of the farm of Hof Westkerke. The finds include coffins, tombstones, gravestones, and wallwork of the former church.
Wiksdorp	Vanished village north of Baarsdorp in De Poel.
Wolfertsdorp	Drowned village on the former island Borssele. The first mention of Wolfertsdorp dates from 1353. It was southeast of Monster, the present Borssele. Shortly after the storm flood of 1530 Wolfertsdorp was mentioned as "entirely swept away".

=== Drowned villages and places in Noord-Beveland ===
Name	Description
Campen	It existed in 976. It drowned during the storm flood of 1530. After the re-diking of Noord-Beveland the present-day Kamperland arose on the site of Campen.
Dyxhoecke	Drowned village. Its parish belonged to the bishopric of Utrecht. It existed in 1329. It drowned in 1530. Vestiges of the village are still found in the neighbourhood of Wissenkerke.
Edekinge (also Ekingen)	Drowned village. Sunk in 1530. (Perhaps the same as Oud-Hamerstee)
Emelisse	Drowned village. First mentioned in 1216. A considerable number of people must have lived there: the records of the bishopric of Utrecht show that there were two pastors. In Emelisse stood further a guest house and a nunnery. During the storm floods of 1530 and 1532 Emelisse vanished.
Ganuenta	In Roman times laid a village north of Colijnsplaat, now covered by the sea.
Nyenvlet	Hamlet northeast of Wissenkerke. It went under during the storm flood of 1530.
Offlet	Drowned village. It is in the archives from 1395 until 1460. Offlet is perhaps the same village as Grutersdijc. Where Grutersdijc was is not known.
Oostkerke	Approximately where Wolphaartsdijk is, on the north coast of Zuid-Beveland It drowned in 1334.
Oud-Geersdijk	This village was in 1216 a separate parish. It vanished in the waves during the floods of 1530 and 1532. In the neighbourhood of the drowned village a new Geersdijk grew after the inpoldering of Noord-Beveland in 1598.
Oud-Hamerstee (Its coat of arms occurs in Smallegange)	Drowned village. North of the present-day Kats. Its church was in 1304 left on the seaward side of the dike and vanished in the Oosterschelde. Vestiges of Oud-Hamerstee can still be found on the mudflats north of Kats.
Oud-Kats	Subburchdijk is an old name for the village that we now know as Kats. In 1530 the village went under. It was so called because its church was answerable to the church of West-Souburg. In 1598 by the re-diking of Noord-Beveland the present-day Kats arose somewhat north of the drowned village. By redistribution of multiple allotments of land in 1971 remains of the old village of Subburchdijk came to the daylight.
Oud-Wissenkerke (I)	Wissenkerke is mentioned as a separate parish in 1242. It must have been a considerable parish, for there lived enough people to need two pastors. Where the first Wissenkerke precisely was is not known. After floods in 1352 the village moved to the north corner of the present-day Geersdijkpolder.
Oud-Wissenkerke (II)	The second Wissenkerke's disappearance was caused by the water as well. It flooded during the storm flood of 1530. The tower of the old Wissenkerke stood a long time; in popular speech this remnant was called the Plompe Toren or Kamperlandse Toren. That is why the Torenpolder got its name. In 1755 the ruin was cleared away. In 1774 a memorial stone commemorating this was placed by the Torenhoeve.
Soetelingkercke (also Soelekerke, Zoelenkerke, apparently also Soeke)	Drowned village in the southwest of the old Noord-Beveland. Its church dated from 1206. It drowned in 1530 and 1532. After re-diking the region of Soetelingkercke was joined to Wissenkerke.
Vlete (also Nyenvlet)	The small village Vlete was known as a place of fishermen. Vlete lay west of Wijtvlet. There stood a chapel to St. Catherina. According to Reygersbergh a castle also stood there. Vlete drowned in 1530.
Weele	Drowned village, north of Wissenkerke. It was mentioned the first time in 1395. Its church belonged to the chapter of St. Peter in Utrecht. The village went under during the storm flood of 1530. The region of the former Weele after re-diking was joined to Wissenkerke and lies now in the Torenpolder.
Welle	Drowned village. Its church was in 1162 in possession of the abbey of Middelburg. Welle drowned in 1530. After the re-diking of Noord-Beveland in 1598 the region of Welle was joined to Colijnsplaat.

=== Drowned villages and places in Zuid-Beveland ===
Name	Description
Coudorpe	A small village, southwest of Driewegen It existed in 1267. It was depopulated by floods. In 1572 the remains of the village were used as reinforcement in the Westerscheldedijk of Zuid-Beveland. The refuge mount of Coudorpe exists, built in the 12th century.
Hongersdijk 1	Drowned village, west of Wilhelminadorp. It went under in 1334 in a flood.
Hongersdijk 2	In 1429 a new Hongersdijk arose. That settlement was not allotted long life either. The village drowned in 1551. A new endiking followed in 1708. In 1857 on the place of the second Hongersdijk still tombstones and remains of the village were found. The place of the finds lay somewhat north of the farm of Hongersdijk.
Nieuw-Everinge	Around 1500 the inhabitants of the drowned Oud-Everinge founded a new village on Zuid-Beveland. That new village flooded in the storm flood of 1530 and had to be cleared. Around 1600 it vanished for good in the Westerschelde.
Oostende	Drowned village northeast of Hoedekenskerke on the southeast coast of Zuid-Beveland. In the 15th century it put up a continuing fight against the advancing Honte (= Westerschelde). In the winter of 1520/1521 Oostende was abandoned and left on the seaward side of the dike. (Distinguish from "Oostende" as the Dutch name of Ostend in Belgium.)
Oud-Everinge	Drowned village west of Ellewoutsdijk (which is on the south corner of Zuid-Beveland). Mentioned in 1288 in the accounts of the bishopric of Utrecht. The exact site is not known. It vanished between 1450 and 1500 in the Westerschelde.
Oud-Krabbendijke	Hendrik of Schoten, lord of Breda, in the 12th century owned land in the area. North of the present-day Krabbendijke on Zuid-Beveland he owned a desolate mud flat. In 1187 he gave it as a generous gesture to the abbey of Ter Doest in Bruges. The monks, industrious people, endiked the mudbank and founded there two big farms. There grew a small village. The St. Felixvloed of 5 November 1530 was too powerful for the monks. Krabbendijke went under. In 1595 after re-diking a new Krabbendijke was founded.
St. Trooye	Drowned settlement.
Vinkenisse	Former village. It had a chapel dedicated to St. Cornelis. Vinkenisse was swallowed by the flood of 1 November 1530. It is in the Westerschelde south of the Zimmermanpolder by Waarde.

=== Drowned villages and places in the Verdronken land van Saeftinghe ===
Name	Description
Auwersluis	Hamlet in the former manor Saeftinghe.
Casuele	Former village. The village lay at a creek called the Couveringe, in the middle of an extensive peat bog region. For the inhabitants that was somewhat as Slochteren is now. They dug the peat out and sold this mediaeval fuel.
Namen	Drowned village. Namen went under in 1715. Its tower remained a long time as a landmark for shipping. Only its tower bell has survived to today. The bell, cast in 1664 in Amsterdam, hangs now in the tower of Graauw. Nieuw-Namen was built to the south, adjacent to the Belgian village of Kieldrecht. (Distinguish from "Namen" as the Dutch name of Namur in Belgium.)
Saeftinghe	The town of Saeftinghe was near Saeftinghe Castle. It went completely under in 1214 by a high flood. The oldest mention of Saeftinghe is a charter of 821 of Louis the Pious of the Frankish Empire. He confirms possession of these places. After a devastating flood in 1334 Saeftinghe was reduced to a village. The Saeftinghe Castle was devastated by the men of Antwerp in the beginning of the 16th century. Around 1930 Gustaaf de Maaijer (Staf de Sterke) outwards from Nieuw-Namen saw the foundations of the castle still above water at ebb tide.
Stampaert	Village.
Ter Hoole	Hamlet, in the neighbourhood of the likewise drowned village Weele.

=== Drowned villages in Schouwen (mostly in its drowned south part) ===
Name	Description
Bommenede	At the north corner of Schouwen-Duiveland. It was listed in 1153 as property of the Cistercian monastery of Ter Duinen in Flanders. The village survived two floods in 1530 and 1532 and a fire in 1540. In 1575 the Spanish commander Mondragon besieged it and shot the village to pieces. After that blow it was never rebuilt. The Grevelingen did the rest in the 17th century. The last occupants left in 1684. The remains of Bommenede still years later showed above water.
Brieskerke (also Breiskerke or Brisselkerc)	Village in the drowned south of Schouwen. Recorded for the first time in 1276. In 1542 Brieskerke was left on the seaward side of the dike, and the village vanished for ever in the Oosterschelde.
Claeskerke (also Clauskinderen and Oostkerke)	Village in the former south of Schouwen, between Westenschouwen and Coudekerke. We now can only see the church tower in the Oosterscheldedijk. Claeskerke, long-term threatened with floods, drowned in 1511 in the Oosterschelde.
Coudekerk	Village in the vanished south of Schouwen. It is one of the few drowned villages which are still very visible in the Zeeland landscape. Of the village remains still the tower, alone and without church with its foundation in the Oosterscheldedijk at the south coast of Schouwen-Duiveland. In 1475 the sea dike was still 3 kilometers from the village, but in 1583 the Oosterschelde had so far advanced that the church had to be demolished. Only the tower, also known as the Plompe Toren, remained, as landmark for shipping. In the tower is a freely accessible visitors' centre with an exhibition about the Zeeland floods.
's Heer Arendshaven	Drowned hamlet and small fishing harbour in the south of Schouwen-Duiveland. It lay in the neighbourhood of Coudekerk in the now drowned, but then through farming prosperous, southland.
Herkesteyn	Drowned and/or burnt up settlement with castle on Schouwen-Duiveland.
Klaaskinderkerke (also Claeskinderkerke)	Vanished and drowned village on Schouwen-Duiveland. Its oldest mention is of 14 January 1286. On that day Pieter Nobel and his brother paid an amount to Floris the V about the harbour and the village. Its church was dedicated to St. Nicolaas. The last pastor, in 1549, was Michael Bense. The Allerheiligenvloed submerged Klaaskinderkerke. The surviving inhabitants did not return. In 1959 archeologists found the churchyard of the village.
Lookshaven (also Laoxhaven)	Drowned village on the south coast of Schouwen. Between 1500 and 1550 it was left on the seaward side of the dike and vanished in the Oosterschelde.
Oud-Westenschouwen	This village was originally called Paalvoetseinde. It was at a creek in an opening of the dunes on Schouwen. The protecting dune girdle became damaged. Oud-Westenschouwen vanished under the sea surface at the end of the 15th century.
Rengerskerke	Vanished and drowned village in the south of Schouwen. By Rengerskerke was a monastery of the Regulieren van Bethlehem, founded in 1479, answerable to the congregation of Sion. Not long after, the Oosterschelde advanced. In 1486 all the canons had to move to a new building. By 1662 the village had totally vanished.
Simonskerke	Drowned village on the south coast of Schouwen. Lost before 1500.
St. Jacobskerke	A village in the south of Schouwen. Lost in the Oosterschelde before 1500.
Welland	Settlement and castle by Noordwelle on Schouwen-Duiveland. Through floods in 1421 and 1424 destroyed and vanished.
Westkerke (3)	Drowned village in the south of Schouwen, a long way south of Coudekerke, therefore south of the present-day Plompe Toren which stands in the Oosterscheldedijk.
Zuidkerke	The most important village of Zuidland, the region at the south corner of Schouwen that at the end of the Middle Ages was eroded away by the aggressive Oosterschelde. Zuidkerke was so named around 1250.

=== Drowned villages in the Drowned Land of Reimerswaal ===
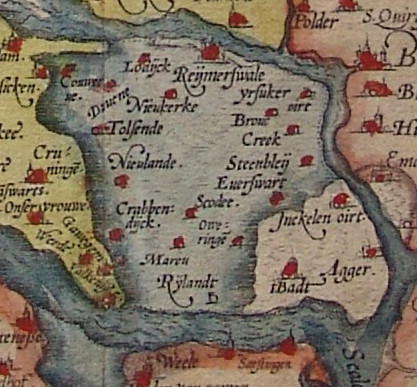
1580 map of Reimerswaal shown in grey

Name	Description
Agger	Drowned village. It went under in 1551.
Assemansbroek	The village Assemansbroek existed apparently in the 13th century. It was opposite Bergen op Zoom on the western bank of the Schelde. It drowned in 1530.
Broecke	Village in the east part of the Drowned Land of Verdronken Land van Reimerswaal. It drowned in 1530-1532.
Couveringe	Village.
Duvenee	West of Reimerswaal town. The name is first known from 1275. It went under during the storm floods of 1530 and 1532.
Kapeldorp	Name first known from 1495. A chapel called the Ramskapel, to the honour of the Holy Virgin and St. Quirinus stood there. Kapeldorp vanished during the floods of 1530 and 1532.
Kouwerve	East of Yerseke. The word "werve" means "artificially raised height". That could not save the village. Kouwerve went under during the storm floods of 1530 and 1532.
Kreke	It lay west of Bergen op Zoom on the left bank of the Schelde. Kreke went under during the storm floods of 1530 and 1532.
Lodijke	Village with castle. It went under during the storm floods of 1530 and 1532, by mismanagement. Kervinck van Reimerswaal lord of Lodijke eagerly wanted a harbour by the village. He thought that a scouring gully which was arisen by a dike break would give him a harbour. The gully scoured away both the castle and the village. The place in the water is now called the Gat van Lodijke. Divers found remains of the castle some years ago there.
Looketers	Hamlet by the village of Steelvlet. Lost in the floods of 1530 and 1532.
Miehole	Hamlet.
Nieuwkerke	It was mentioned as a parish in 1240. Its church was a splitting of the parish of Lodijke. Nieuwkerke went under in 1530. The tower long remained a landmark in the flooded land.
Nieuwlande	500 meters from the dike of the present-day Zuid-Beveland. It was mentioned in 1242 in Latin as Terra Nova. It went under during the storm floods of 1530 and 1532. The inhabitants must have been known as pious people. As a result, Nieuwland became a haven for treasure diggers, who found 600 so-called pilgrim badges there, frequently rather suggestive ornaments with phallic symbols. These pilgrimage souvenirs were bought by the collector Van Beuningen. They are now in the Museum Boijmans Van Beuningen. Rubble and foundations of Nieuwlande show above water at ebb tide. It is a forbidden region. Ruins are visible on satellite pictures.
Ouderdinge	Northeast of Rilland. Its name is recorded from 1288. Its church was dedicated to St. James and the Holy Virgin. It drowned in 1530.
Poppendijke	Hamlet.
Reimerswaal	The drowned Reimerswaal was the third town of Zeeland. It was flooded in 1530 and went definitively under in 1634. Its name has recently been reused as the name of a new municipality formed by amalgamating five villages in the east of Zuid-Beveland.
Schoudee	Village in the western part of the Drowned Land of Reimerswaal. It sank in 1530-1532.
St. Jooskapel	Hamlet. It went under in 1530.
Steelvlet	It went under in the floods of 1530 and 1532.
Tolsende (also Tolseynde, Totelsende, Tholsende)	It started in a 12th-century endiking east of Yerseke. Tolsende was first recorded in 1275. Storm floods happened regularly. In 1439 Tolsende became property in land of symbolic value. It was noted as a lost domain. After re-diking the village vanished definitively during the floods of 1530 and 1532. In 1656 and 1669 small pieces of the drowned Tolsende were re-diked and joined to Kruiningen and Yerseke. The name survives still as the Olzendepolder south of Yerseke.
Yersekeroord	Settlement in the Land of Reimerswaal. It is located where the Schelde (which then still flowed into the Oosterschelde) turned west by the height of Bergen op Zoom, stood the toll house of Yersekeroord. On old maps that is indicated as a stone fort. Yersekeroord drowned during the storm floods of 1530 and 1532.
Zwartewale (also Swartewaal, Swartewiel)	Hamlet in the Land of Reimerswaal, between Duvenee and Nieuwkerke. It drowned during the floods of 1530 and 1532.

=== Drowned villages in the Braakman ===
Name	Description
Hughersluis (c.1500)	Small town. It was a centre for transport of peat by ship.
Hertinge	South of the Mauritsfort in Zeelandic Flanders. Hertinghe counted 33 dwellings in 1469. In the 1488 flood it vanished from the map.
Koudekerke	Village.
Moerkerke	Moerkerk was a village along a road at the south of Biervliet, a street with houses and farms on each side. The village drowned in 1488.
Niekerke (also Nieuw-Moerkerke or Nieuwerkerke)	Its church lay between Mauritsfort and Sluiskil. In 1393 a storm flood submerged the village. The last mention of its name dates from 1404.
Oud-IJzendijke	Oud-IJzendijke appears in the archives in 1046. It got town rights in 1127. The first IJzendijke went under in 1404. In 1587 the Spanish army commander Parma had a redoubt with 4 bulwarks built two kilometers southwest of the old IJzendijke. That was the beginning of IJzendijke such as we now know: it was thus founded by the Spanish.
Pakinge (also St. Laurenskerke)	Village northwest of Hoek in Zeelandic Flanders between two other drowned villages: Wevelswale and Vremdijke. Of Pakinge we know that there were, apart from houses or huts, also two sheepfolds. Pakinge went under in the waves of the Braakman in 1214. After all this time Pakinge is only a memory in books.
Peerboom	South of Sluiskil. First mentioned in 1250. The Flemish abbey of Ter Duinen had there in 1240 a grange and a big farm. To this grange also a hospital was linked. War violence sealed the fate of the village of Peerboom. In 1488 Maximiliaan of Oostenrijk started a war in the present-day Zeelandic Flanders. Peerboom had to become desolate because of floods. The storm flood of 1493 sealed the fate of Peerboom.
St. Laurenskerke	Village.
Stardijk	Drowned hamlet in Zeelandic Flanders, lost about 1300. It was in the neighbourhood of Boterzande in the present-day Braakman.
Steelant	Village southwest of Terneuzen, in the direction of Sluiskil It was in 1199 a parish. The church belonged to the chapter of St. Salvator at Utrecht. Steeland counted in 1469 95 dwellings. The village went under water in the 14th century and vanished in 1488 definitively in the advancing Braakman.
Ter Piet	Hamlet or village in Zeelandic Flanders, north of Biervliet. In 1242 the region about Ter Piet came into possession of St. Peter's Abbey. The inhabitants of Ter Piet were small farmers. They specialised in growing wheat and madder. Each year they had to pay tax, ground taxes, hauled off to the landowners in Ghent. One part of that payment was for the place's pastor and his expenses. The archives show clearly that the farmers of Ter Piet did not always agree. Regularly they could not pay their ground taxes in full. The abbot of St. Peter's sent then immediately a messenger on horse to Biervliet. The mounted bailiff had to take care that the folk of Ter Piet paid to the last penny. Ter Piet vanished during the storm flood of 8 October 1375 in the Braakman, which was then called the Zuudzee.
Vremdijke (also Vroondijk, Vremdic, Frondic, Vrandic)	In 1114 the abbey of St. Peter at Ghent owned all immovable property in Vremdijke. The church of Vremdijke was dedicated to St. Basilius. Through storm floods in the 14th and the 15th century much property in land vanished in the Braakman. Vremdijke went under in 1488. Two years after a re-diking a new Vremdijke was founded, in 1515. In 1579 the pastor Michael Struv van Vremdijke converted to Protestantism. That went not entirely smoothly. An enquiry showed that the ex-pastor was not good at home in the rituals of the new doctrine. He was steered to the strongly Calvinist Ghent. The elders of Vremdijke asked for a new preacher; Lieven Koene was appointed. After 1590, when Prince Maurits had conquered Zeelandic Flanders, the region became a sort of mission area. Vremdijke, Terneuzen and Biervliet together got a preacher. To get from Terneuzen to Biervliet he had to go behind round the Braakman, via Philippine. In 1592 the preacher was Johannes Bollius, a preacher trained in Ghent. He lived in Vremdijke. During a storm flood in the night of 25/26 November 1601 the Braakman broke anew through the dikes. Vremdijke flooded. Many inhabitants drowned. Pastor Bollius survived the night's catastrophe. He fled landwards to find a dry place. He came straight to the still new Mauritsfort. He built there a new church and organised the municipality of Hoek.
Wevelswale	Coastal village by the Westerschelde north of Hoek in Zeelandic Flanders. St. Baaf's Abbey at Ghent had a farm in Wevelswale. Wevelswale was named for the first time in 1170. It was protected by the Monniksdijk. Wevelswale was in the mouth of the present-day Braakman, approximately where now the Braakmanhaven is, west of the Nieuw-Neuzenpolder. One rich farmer, a certain Arnoldus of Evergem, could collect tax in Wevelswale about 1170. One problem was for Arnoldus to transport his collected tax, the tithes, to his far southerly farm by Evergem. Thus he exchanged the right of tithe gathering in Wevelswale with the big landowners of St. Baaf's Abbey at Ghent. He got there in return a tithe by Evergem. Another farmer in Wevelswale was Dirk Cleyland. He owned there about 1268 a knights' hall place. Wevelswale drowned in 1375/1376 in the Braakman.
Willemskerke	Drowned village in the Braakman.

=== Zeeland and West Brabant: doubtful cases ===
Name	Description
Axel	Flooded in 1606 and 1808, but directly rebuilt on the same place.
Herkesteyn	Drowned and/or burnt down settlement with castle on Schouwen-Duiveland.
Pelkem	A parish at IJzendijke, not more closely localisable. (Records of Saint Janshospitaal in Bruges).
Scaltheim	Mysterious settlement from the 9th century. On the coast of Schouwen. Vanished in the sea through pulling back of the coast.
Sypenesse	Suspected drowned manor by Tholen. The coat of arms of Sypenesse comes on the armorial chart of M. Smallegange in his "Nieuwe Cronyck van Zeeland" [= "new chronicle of Zeeland"] (1696).
Tubendic	Mentioned in 1025, when St. Peter's Abbey obtained the hamlet of Tubendic in the neighbourhood of Oostburg. Tubendic is the oldest dike name in west Zeelandic Flanders.

=== Zeeland and West Brabant: drowned islands in the delta region ===
Name	Description
Waterdunen	Drowned in 1130
Wulpen	Drowned in 1570
Koezand	Drowned in 1570
Cadesant	Drowned in 1570
Schoneveld	Drowned in 1375
Stuivezant	Drowned in 1570
Orisant	Drowned in 1639

=== 11 villages west of the Grote Hollandse Waard, east of the current gully of De Striene ===
Name	Description
Strienemonde	The drowned Strienemonde was a settlement in the Striene where the Count of Holland levied a toll.
Oud-Strijen	A village suspected to be somewhere by the Zwanegat. It drowned in 1288, and was partly moved to the present-day Strijen, partly to Oosterhout (Slotbosse Toren or house of Strijen).
Niervaart (now Groote Ketel)	The village of Niervaart was between Klundert and Zevenbergen. A farm named Groote Ketel is there now.
Overdrage	The drowned Overdrage was somewhere east of Klundert. It is not the same village as Niervaart.
Zonzeel	Drowned village southeast of Langeweg. When Zonzeel drowned in 1421, a chapel remained behind on the Markdijk. The name Zonzeel comes back in the Zonzeelse Polder, and in the daily traffic jam reports: the choke point Zonzeel.
Nieuwenbosch	Drowned village north of Oudenbosch.
Nieuw-Gastel	Drowned village. Little else is known about it.
Valkenburg	A drowned village south of Willemstad (area around Helwijk)
Koeveringe	Southwest of Steenbergen, in the region that now is known as De Kladde.
Polre	South of the present-day bridge between West-Brabant and Tholen. Also named Heer Boudewijns Polder or Nieuw Schakerlo.
Friezenmoerdijk	The settlement of Friezenmoerdijk lay in the drowned domain of Friezenmoerdijk, in the region of Oud-Vossemeer and Nieuw Vossemeer

=== 4 or 5 drowned villages east of the Schelde ===
Name	Description
Vijfhuizen	A hamlet at the head of Bergen op Zoom Harbour
Hildernisse	West of Bergen op Zoom, by the water tower, lies the drowned Hildernisse.
Kloosteroord	location unknown
Oud-Ossendrecht	The drowned Oud-Ossendrecht is called now De Aanwas.
Oud Berendrecht	In the frontier region of the present-day North Brabant and Belgium lies the drowned Berendrecht. The village was later moved to the present-day Berendrecht in Belgium.

== Drowned villages in the Grote Hollandse Waard alias South Hollandse Waard ==
=== 9 villages on the south bank of the Maas, in Brabant and South Holland, in order from west to east ===
Name	Description
Weede	A village drowned in 1421. Most westerly village in the Grote Waard. The inhabitants of Weede fled to the area around Cillaarshoek, a little piece of dike north of Strijen in the present-day Hoekse Waard. Their offspring live there still.
Wieldrecht	A village drowned in 1421.
Twintighoeven	A village drowned in 1421.
Dubbelmonde	A village drowned in 1421.
Almonde	A village drowned in 1421.
Drimmelen	The oldest Drimmelen was entirely drowned in 1421. The second Drimmelen was abandoned quietly and is known as "Oud-Drimmelen". The third Drimmelen is the yacht harbour.
Standhazen	A domain drowned in 1421 between Drimmelen and Geertruidenberg. Unclear if there was a village there.
Broek	Drowned village on the southwest dike of the Grote Waard, approximately where now the Moerdijk bridges are.
Achthoeven	A village drowned in 1421.

=== 16 villages north of the Maas ===
Name	Description
Alloysen	no information
Almstein	no information
Almsvoet	no information
Annekerke	no information
Eemskerk	no information
Eemstein	no information
De Mijl	no information
Gregenmonde	no information
Heer Aartswaard	nl:Aartswaarde
Hardeverd	no information
Houwningen	no information
Kraayenstein	no information
Kruiskerke	no information
Tiesselingskerke	no information
Werken	no information
Wolfbrantskerke	no information

=== Drowned villages in the former Grote Hollandse Waard alias South Hollandse Waard, whose locations are not known ===
Name	Description
Dordsmonde	no information
Ledekerke	no information
Merwede	no information
Poelwijk	no information

== One drowned village in the Hoekse Waard ==
Name	Description
Schuring	With the hamlet Capelle near Zierikzee, the hamlet Schuring near Numansdorp in the Hoekse Waard shares the doubtful honour of being the most recent drowned village of the delta. Schuring drowned during the water disaster of 1953 and was not rebuilt.

== Drowned villages in the Haarlemmermeer and other inland lakes ==
Name	Description
Beinsdorp	Abandoned as the Haarlemmermeer spread. A new village in the Haarlemmermeerpolder was named after it.
Rijk	Abandoned as the Haarlemmermeer spread.
Vennep	Abandoned as the Haarlemmermeer spread. Nieuw Vennep in the Haarlemmermeerpolder was named after it.
Vijfhuizen	Abandoned as the Haarlemmermeer spread. A new village in the Haarlemmermeerpolder was named after it.

== Drowned villages in waters round Wieringen, listed in records as property of Fulda Monastery, late 8th, early 9th century ==
Name	Description
Unnamed farms & woods in Wieringen by River Marsdiep (spelt Maresdeop)	Given by one Gerwic of Friesland. Probably drowned in Waddenzee in early Middle Ages in flood disasters which formed the Zuiderzee. Wieringen & Texel were likely much bigger than the modern islands and extended over much of what is now the west end of the Waddenzee, and the Marsdiep (described as a fluvium = "river") flowed between them with banks of dry land. The exit of the old freshwater Lacus Flevo / Almere was the Vlie river, reaching the sea through what is now the Vliestroom between Vlieland and Terschelling; but the river Marsdiep may have been a distributary of the Vlie, and `diep' in its name implies a big river.
Wictulfingafurt	In Wieringen. Given by one Geltrud. Farmland & woods, including meadow that produced 20 cartloads of hay each year. Probably drowned as in previous entry. The name means "ford of the sons or people of Wichtwulf"
Brochenlar	In Wieringen. Given by one Isanbalt and his wife Sigibirn from Friesland. Ploughland that needed 11 measures of seed to sow it. Probably drowned as in previous entry.
and other unnamed lands	The Fulda list, and a possessions list dated 948 of St. Martin's church in Utrecht, list in Wieringen much more land than could fit into the modern island known as Wieringen.

== Other drowned or otherwise lost villages in the Zuiderzee ==
Name	Description
Emmeloord	The most northern of the settlements on Schokland. An old spelling is Emelwerth. Abandoned in 19th century because of continual attacks by sea floods. The modern town of Emmeloord was named after it.
Gonsende or Gawijzend	A village in the southern part of the Wieringermeerpolder. Drowned about 1350. Its remains have been found.
Middelbuurt	A settlement on Schokland. Abandoned in 19th century because of continual attacks by sea floods.
Molenbuurt	A settlement on Schokland. Abandoned in 19th century because of continual attacks by sea floods.

== Drowned villages in east and central Friesland and western Groningen provinces ==
Much land was lost when the Lauwerszee formed. It has been reclaimed since.

== Drowned villages in Groningen province ==
Name	Description
Reiderland	Partly in Germany. An area of land with 33 villages and the town Torum. Drowned when the Dollart formed in 1277. Some of the villages may have drowned later. Before the flood, the river Ems looped north of the village of Nes, which survived on an island which is now part of the north bank of the Ems. Some of the area has been empoldered since.

== See also ==
- List of flooded villages in Zeeland
