= Reimerswaal =

The name Reimerswaal can mean:

- Reimerswaal (city) A lost city in the Netherlands
  - Verdronken Land van Reimerswaal The now-drowned land around the city
  - Battle of Reimerswaal on 29 January 1574 during the Eighty Years' War
- Reimerswaal (municipality) A municipality in Zealand, Netherlands, named after the lost city
