= Wulpen =

- Wulpen, Belgium, a village in Belgium, part of the municipality of Koksijde
- Wulpen (island), a former island in the Netherlands
