= Grote Hollandse Waard =

Former farming region in the County of Holland, Netherlands

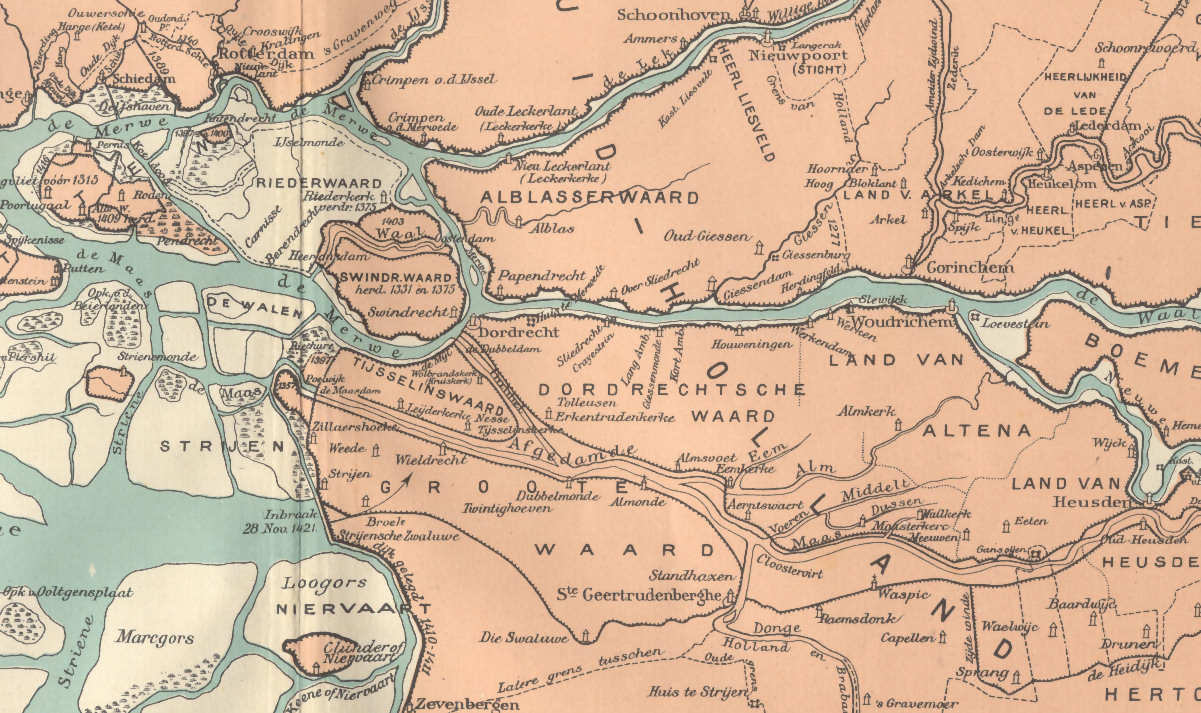
The Groote Waard and surrounding areas in 1421, just before the St. Elizabeth's flood

The Grote Waard or Hollandse Waard was a farming region in the County of Holland at the border of the Duchy of Brabant, that disappeared in the St. Elizabeth's flood. Parts of this polder are now separated by water: Hoekse Waard, Eiland van Dordrecht, De Biesbosch, and parts of North Brabant. The Grote Waard was a damp peat region, which was roughly limited by what now is the Afgedamde Maas between Heusden and Woudrichem, the Boven Merwede and Beneden Merwede, Dordrecht, Maasdam, the Keizersdijk between Maasdam and Strijen, Strijensas, Lage Zwaluwe, and Hooge Zwaluwe.

== See also ==
- Drowned villages in the Grote Hollandse Waard alias Zuid-Hollandse Waard
