= Braakman =

Tidal inlet in Zeelandic Flanders, Netherlands

Coordinates: 51°19′22″N 3°44′16″E

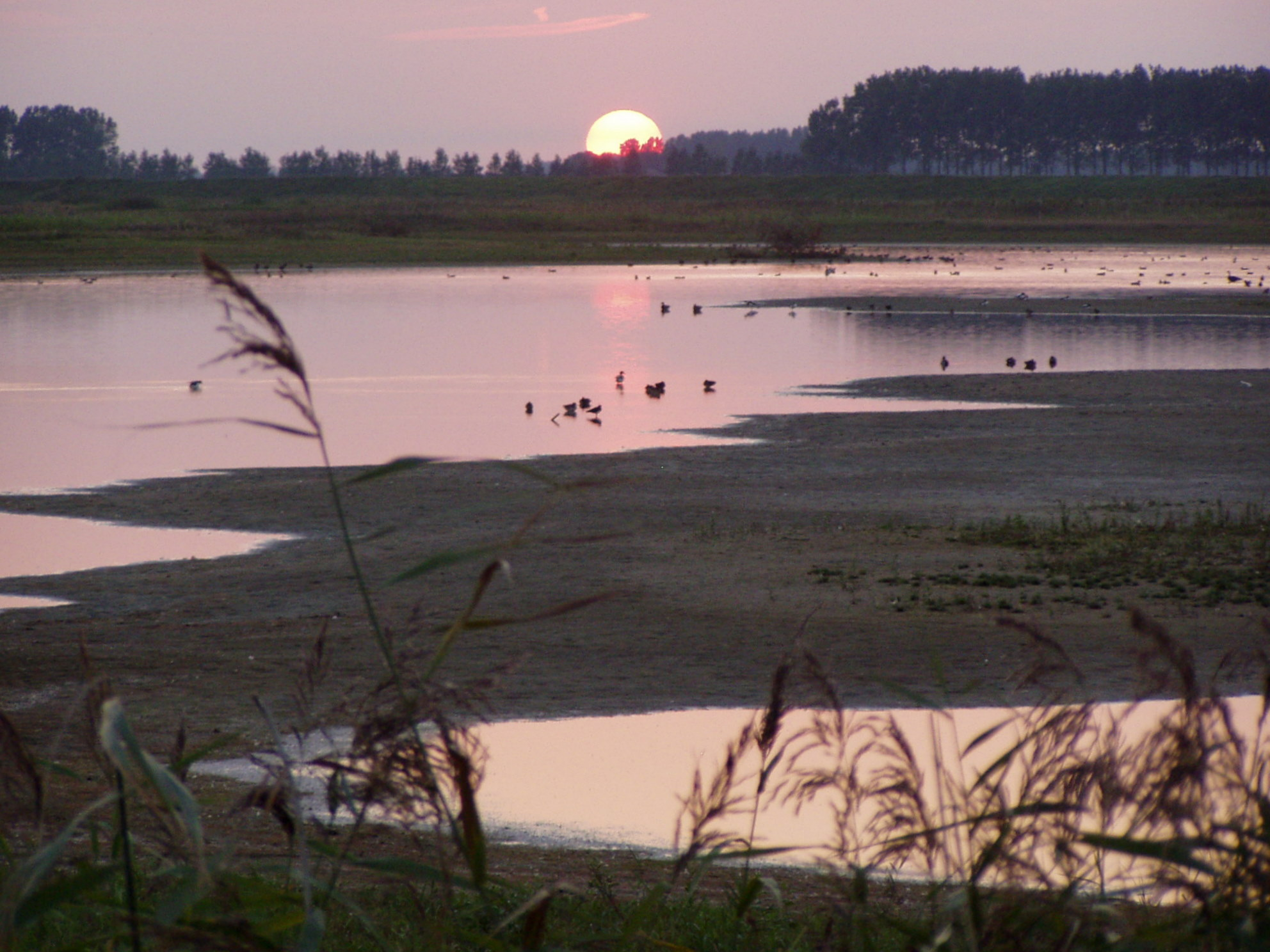
Sunset over the Braakman

The Braakman was a large tidal inlet in the middle of the Dutch region of Zeelandic Flanders, on the south bank of the Westerschelde west of Terneuzen.

It was created by a succession of storm surges in the 14th and 15th centuries, including the St. Elizabeth's flood (1404) and the St. Elizabeth's flood (1421). For a long time the Braakman was a natural barrier between east and west Zeelandic Flanders, and also access to the ports of Boekhoute, Philippine, Axel and Sas van Gent. Over the centuries it steadily spread, drowning at least 15 villages between 1200 and 1601. Then, people fought back. Successive empolderings shrank the Braakman to a remnant, which was finally closed off from the sea in 1952. During the North Sea flood of 1953, this dam proved its worth: it resisted the flood and prevented flooding in the hinterland.

The remaining body of water is used for recreation, and part of its seaward end was made into the Braakmanhaven port area.
