= St. Felix's flood =

1530 flood in the Netherlands

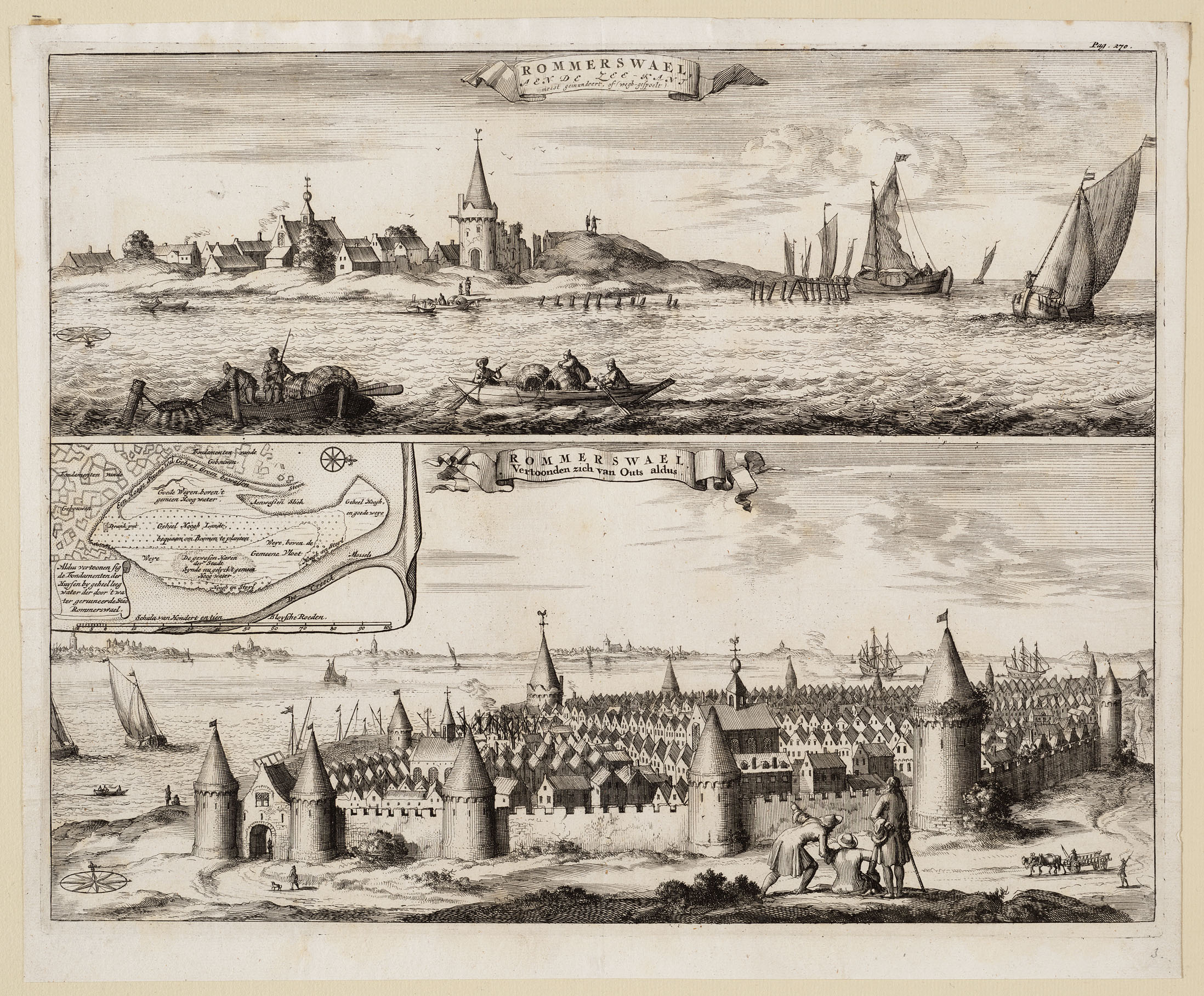
Map of Reimerswaal by Mattheus Smallegange

The St. Felix's flood (in Dutch Sint-Felixvloed) happened on Saturday, 5 November 1530, the name day of St. Felix. This day was later known as Evil Saturday (kwade zaterdag). Large parts of Flanders and Zeeland were washed away, including the Verdronken Land van Reimerswaal. According to Audrey M. Lambert, "all the Oost Wetering of Zuid-Beveland was lost, save only the town of Reimerswaal."

Reportedly, more than 100,000 were killed in the Netherlands by the St. Felix's flood.

== See also ==
- Floods in the Netherlands
