= List of floods in the Netherlands =

This is a chronological list of sea-floods that have occurred in the Netherlands. In addition to these there have been hundreds of river floods during the centuries.

Name	Date	Place	Deaths	Details
	838	Northwest of the Netherlands (part of Friesland)	2,437	A large part of the northwest of the Netherlands (in that time the land belonged to Frisia – now called Friesland) was flooded by a storm. Lack of good dikes was an important cause of this flood disaster. This flood is also described in the Annales Xantenses.
	1014		Thousands	For the first time the partially closed coast line of the Netherlands was breached. Walcheren suffered a particularly large amount of damage. It took years before people managed to get their lives back on track. The chronicle of the Quedlinburg abbey in Saxony
	1042	Flemish coast and in particular the region of the Yser mouth.		Flood mentioned in Annales Blandiniensis (Ghent).
	1163			The Netherlands experienced several floods this year. This caused dike breaches along the Maas. As a result, the mouth of the Oude Rijn at Katwijk, which was already almost entirely silted up, was entirely closed by sediment carried around by the flood.
All Saints' flood	1170	North Sea, Zuiderzee and Waddenzee.		Large parts of the north of the Netherlands and the Zuiderzee region were inundated. A channel from the North Sea was opened into the fresh water Lake Flavo (Almere lake), and it became the salt water Zuiderzee. Two factors causing this sea enlargement were important: first was the sea area increase, second the presence of large peat areas, which were easily washed away.
St. Nicholas' Flood(nl) (Sint-Nicolaasvloed)	1196	Large parts of the north of the Netherlands and the Zuiderzee region were inundated.		Where the storm flood of 1170 made a beginning, this storm worsened it, washing away large peat areas. The result of this storm was destruction of peat areas in West Friesland and enlarging the Waddenzee and the Almere which became the Zuiderzee.
	1212	North Holland	60,000	
	1214			Storm flood affecting all parts of the Netherlands. Much erosion of peat areas.
St. Marcellus' Flood(nl) (Sint-Marcellusvloed).	1219	West Friesland and Groningen.	36,000	This was the 4th large flood in 50 years. This had enormous consequences on the development of the two large inner seas in the Netherlands, the Zuiderzee and the Waddenzee.
	1248 20 November, 28 December, and 4 February 1249	North Holland, Friesland and Groningen.		The coastal dunes were breached (possibly at Callantsoog), flooding parts of North Holland.
	1277	Reiderland		
	1280	Large parts of the north of the Netherlands were inundated.		This flood created the Lauwerszee.
	1282	Waddenzee and IJsselmeer.		A storm broke through the coastal dunes around Texel sparking the cause of the flood.
St. Lucia's flood	1287		~50,000 to 80,000	
Grote Mandrenke	1362	Netherlands, Schleswig, Jutland, England	at least 25,000	Hurricane-force winds drove enormous waves atop an incredible storm surge that carved a huge inland sea into the Netherlands. The salt sea swallowed sixty parishes in the Danish diocese of the bishops of Slesvig. This storm also demolished much infrastructure in England.
St. Elizabeth's flood	1404	Zeeland and Holland		
St. Elizabeth's flood	1421	Zeeland and Holland	2,000 to 10,000	
St. Felix's Flood	1530		100,000+	Large parts of Flanders and Zeeland were washed away, including the Verdronken Land van Reimerswaal. According to Audrey M. Lambert, "all the Oost Wetering of Zuid-Beveland was lost, save only the town of Reimerswaal."
All Saints' flood	1570	Egmond, Bergen Op Zoom, and Saeftinghe	20,000	
	1675	North Netherlands		
Great Storm of 1703	1703	Friesland	8,000 to 15,000	This storm caused a flood killing thousands of victims. There are no wind measurements available, but a wealth of reports and diaries make it clear that this storm was extremely serious. The storm reached its peak in the night and led to enormous damage and numerous dike breaches. It was heaviest in an area of approximately 500 kilometres wide in Wales, central and southern England, the North Sea, the Low Countries, and the north of Germany. At many places there was talk of a high storm surge. Seamen reported tornadoes. Other sources wrote about a terrible storm and these well agree with each other. The air was full of lightning. The English journalist and writer Daniel Defoe (the writer of Robinson Crusoe) wrote concerning the "most terrible storm which the world ever saw". The storm was according to Defoe so dreadful that there was no pen to describe it. There had already been a storm for two weeks, but this was the peak. The south of Friesland was flooded from several dike breaches. A Zeelandish captain wrote in a letter to the admiralty of Zeeland that the storm could not be withstood. The Dutch fleet was hit hard, but the British fleet bore the heaviest blows. Dozens of war ships sailed to the English coasts where thousands of victims died. Meteorologists have tried to reconstruct the chart of this storm. Above Scandinavia the air pressure was high at the beginning of December 1703, but in the Bay of Biscay south west of the United Kingdom there were two depressions. The first depression went up the North Sea, the second went to Scotland. The venom, however, was in a new block which appeared at Ireland. This increasingly drew in strong activity around the middle and from Britain further to the east. The storm blew on the south side of the depression where the south of Britain had a hurricane, wind strength 12. The barometers plummeted dramatically: according to calculations the air pressure must have decreased to 950 millibars, a rare low for Britain. A powerful anticyclone which came immediately ensured enormous air pressure differences, as a result of which it blew terribly this way.
Christmas flood of 1717	1717	Groningen, Zwolle, Dokkum, Amsterdam, and Haarlem	14,000	
	1820	Holland		This flood inundated large parts of the Alblasserwaard, after a number of dike breaches. Also the lock between the Linge and the canal from Steenenhoek to Gorinchem succumbed on 26 January during the events of this calamity. An area of approximately 1300 km^{2} came under water during this calamity.
February flood of 1825	1825	Groningen, Friesland and Overijssel	800+	The provinces listed were flooded through serious dike breaks.
	1836	Leyden, and Amsterdam		Two hurricane-driven floods took place late in the year. One reached the gates of Amsterdam in November, while another one flooded Leyden on Christmas Day. This flood prompted the draining of the Haarlemmermeer.
	1916	Northwest Netherlands		Dikes broke at dozens of places around the Zuiderzee
North Sea flood of 1953	1953	Netherlands, Belgium, United Kingdom	2,551	

== See also ==
- Flood control in the Netherlands
