= Steenenhoek Canal =

Canal in South Holland, Netherlands

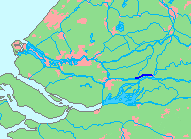
- The location of the canal
- Interactive map of Steenenhoek Canal
- Country: Netherlands

Specifications
- Length: 8.7 km (5.4 miles)

Geography
- Direction: West
- Start point: Linge River
- End point: Beneden Merwede
- Beginning coordinates: 51.835°N 4.979°E
- Ending coordinates: 51.821°N 4.859°E

The Steenenhoek Canal (in Dutch : Kanaal van Steenenhoek) is a Dutch canal in southeastern Netherlands.

The canal runs from the northern part of Gorinchem where it connects to Linge. The canal goes west along the railway and A15 (Rotterdam-Nijmegen) motorway. Then it flows to the North of Boven-Hardinxveld to connect with Beneden Merwede (Lower Merwede) at Neder-Hardinxveld in the municipality of Hardinxveld-Giessendam where a pumping station is used to maintain the water level.

== History ==
The Steenenhoek Canal was built in the beginning of 19th century to reduce the risk of flooding by diverting the water away from the Linge.

Before Steenenhoek Canal construction, the River Linge flowed towards Beneden Merwede through canals of the neighbourhood and town centre of Gorinchem with frequent floods.

== See also ==
- Rhine–Meuse–Scheldt delta
