= Rengerskerke =

Coat of arms

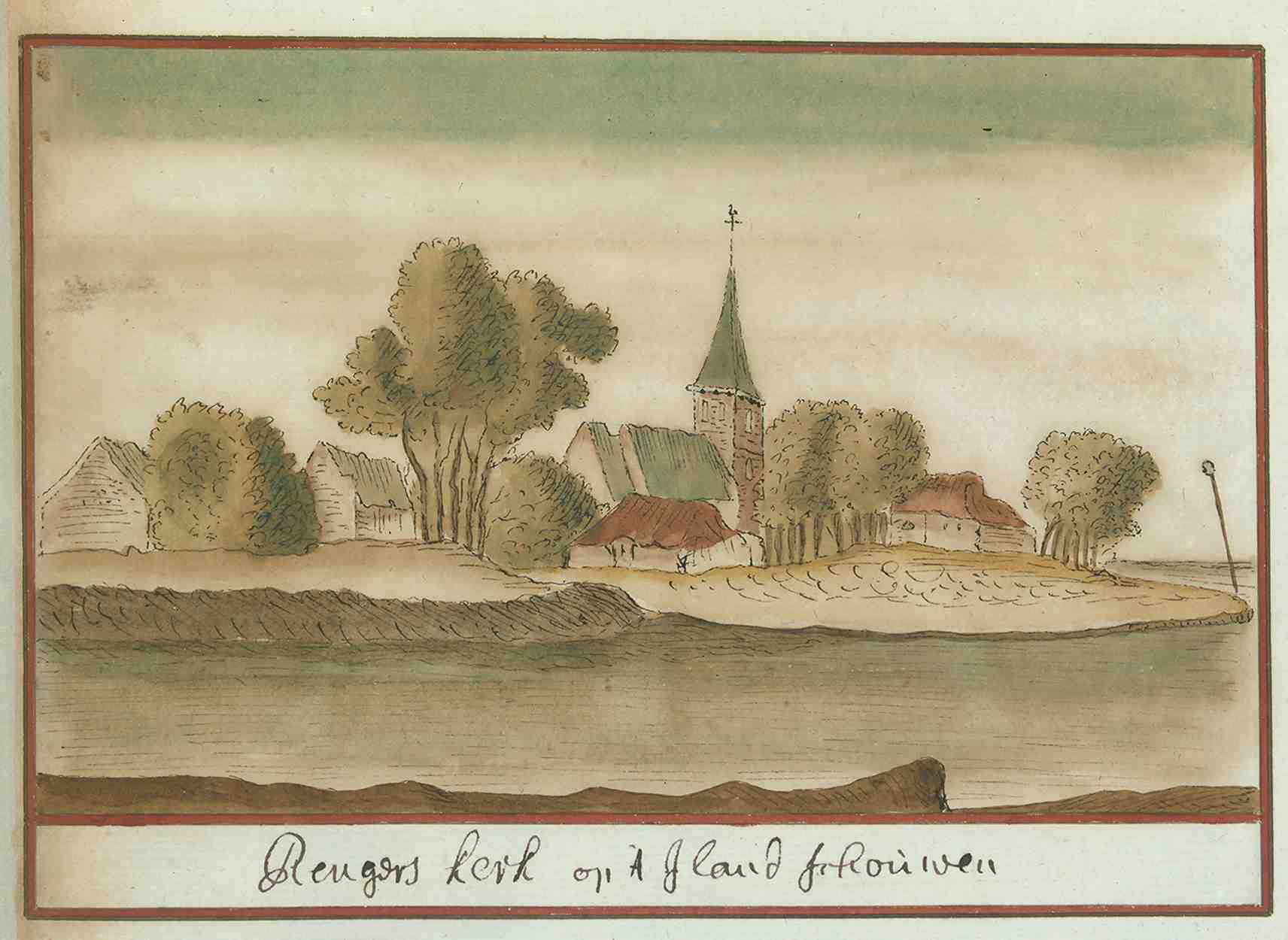
Rengerskerk in Schoemaker Atlas

Rengerskerke is a former village and heerlijkheid on the island Schouwen-Duiveland, Zeeland, the Netherlands. The village was located on the part of Schouwen. The village was founded in 1308 and was lost after it flooded in 1662.

Rengerskerke owes its name from a person named Renger who was the founder of the church dedicated to Laurentius. The village had a horse market. As a reference there is a horse in the coat of arms of Rengerskerke. The church was probably originally a daughter church of Zuidkerke, but in the 14th century Rengerskerke was an independent parish. In 1479, a monastery was founded within the parish.

There may have been a motte-and-bailey castle in Rengerswerve.

The oldest mention of the village is from 1308. Between 1588 and 1591, an inlay dike was constructed north of Rengerskerke, which caused the village to lie in the inlay. During the storm of 1662, this inlay flooded and so the village of Rengerskerke was lost. Part of the heerlijkheid survived. From 1636 to 1860 there was still a school in Rengerskerke. An artillery battery was also built in Rengerskerke to protect the coast: the hamlet of Houtenpoppen that was located here in the 18th century, was probably named after the wooden guardhouses of the soldiers.
