= All Saints' Flood (1570) =

Flooding on the coasts of Germany and the Netherlands

The All Saints' Flood of 1570 occurred on November 1–2, 1570 in the Spanish Netherlands, and is considered the worst North Sea flood disaster before the 20th century. It flooded the entire coast of the Netherlands and East Frisia. The effects were felt from Calais in Flanders to Jutland and even Norway. Even though the alleged casualty figures were mostly based on rough estimates and should be viewed with skepticism, up to 25,000 deaths can be assumed.

== Course of events ==
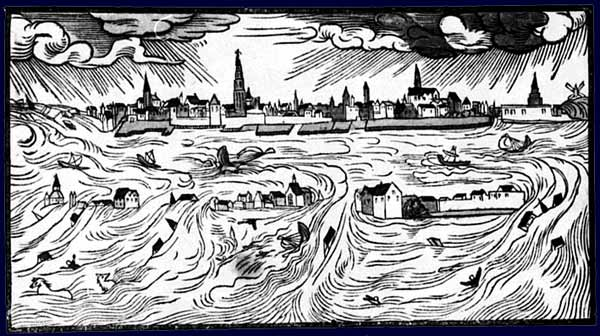
Drawing by Hans Moser in 1570 of Scheldt flood

The morning before the storm surge, a warning of a very strong flood had been issued for the first time in history. In Bergen op Zoom, the Domain Council, the local administration, had issued the warning, but it had not had the intended effect, as most victims were not reached by the warning and were caught unprepared by the flood. With a level of more than four meters above the mean high water, the flood was well above the height of the dikes existing at the time, which were also severely neglected. In numerous places, the dikes were overrun by the water masses, causing incredible devastation. For example, in the area around Antwerp, four villages disappeared under a thick layer of mud and in Zeeland the small island Wulpen was permanently lost to the sea. Chroniclers of the time reported that 80 percent of the country was under water. It was confirmed that the floods drowned 20,000 people.

East Frisia and the offshore islands were also hit hard. A high tide mark at the church of Suurhusen, located north of Emden, showed + 4.40 m NN. In many places, the dikes broke and devastated entire stretches of land that were under water for up to four weeks. The salt water meant that fields and meadows could no longer be used for a long time. The flooding reached as far as the Alte Land on the Elbe, the Vierlande near Hamburg and as far as Eiderstedt. Between the Ems and Weser rivers, around 10,000 people died and tens of thousands were left homeless. Entire villages disappeared and livestock and supplies were destroyed.

The storm surge was seen as God's punishment. In the Protestant provinces of the Netherlands, it was understood as a call to rebel more vigorously against Spanish oppression, after the still unsuccessful uprising in 1568. In 1572, the Geuzen succeeded in conquering the provinces of Zeeland and Holland, which had been badly hit by the floods.

== See also ==
- Floods in the Netherlands
- Saeftinghe legend, folklore and legend of this flood

== Sources ==
Part of the text on this page originated from the Internet site of the KNMI (page in Dutch).
