= St. Elizabeth's flood (1404) =

Flood on the coast of the North Sea

- Native name: Sint Elisabethsvloed
- Date: c. 19 November 1404
- Location: Flanders, Zeeland, and Holland

The St. Elizabeth's flood (Sint Elisabethsvloed) of 1404 occurred on or around 19 November 1404, the namesake day of St. Elizabeth. The floods were especially catastrophic in Flanders, Zeeland, and Holland. The area in Zeeland and Flanders had been flooded 29 years earlier, on 8 October 1375. As a result of the floods, the Braakman was created or enlarged. In this new area, new parishes and villages started to appear. The flood in 1404 destroyed the area again, just as it had done in 1375. Other areas previously untouched such as the small towns of IJzendijke and Hugevliet were engulfed and destroyed during the flood. When the flood occurred many were killed and homes destroyed due to the poor warnings.

On 19 November 1404, large areas of Flanders, Zeeland, and Holland, were flooded. The storm tide responsible became known as the First Saint Elizabeth's flood. The damage was catastrophic. The area of Zeeland-Flanders had already been flooded 29 years earlier, in 1375. Through this, the Zuiderzee was created. Around the Zuiderzee, polders were diked, and within these polders, new parishes arose. Unfortunately, in 1404, everything was destroyed again. This time, a complete spit that was home to a number of small towns such as Ijzendijke and Hugevliet, which were spared in 1375, was engulfed during the flood. In the county of Flanders all the coast islands in the mouth of the Westerschelde were washed away. After this calamity John the Fearless, Duke of Burgundy (Jan zonder Vrees) gave the command to link all the dikes already existing into one large dike which ran from the north of the county to the south. This explains why the Belgian coast line is so straight. Since Jan zonder Vrees was also count of Flanders, this dike is still named Graaf Jansdijk.

== See also ==
- St. Elizabeth's flood (1421), a flood that occurred on the same day 17 years later.
- Floods in the Netherlands
