= St. Elizabeth's flood (1421) =

Flooding of the Grote Hollandse Waard, an area in what is now the Netherlands

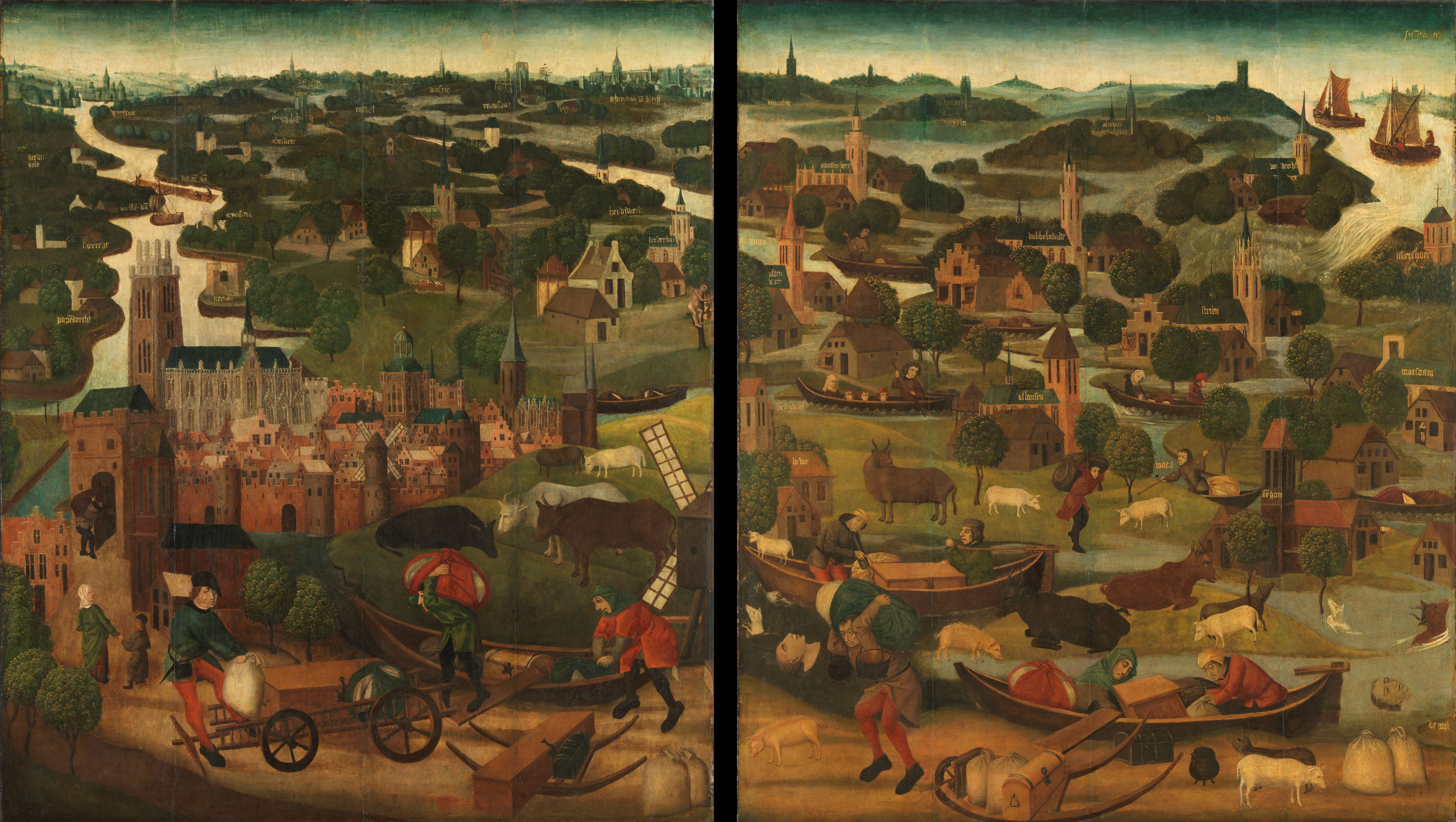
- A near-contemporary painting depicting the St. Elizabeth's flood
- Native name: Sint Elisabethsvloed
- Date: 18–19 November 1421
- Time: night
- Location: Grote Hollandse Waard
- Deaths: 2,000–10,000

The St. Elizabeth's flood of 1421 was a flooding of the Grote Hollandse Waard, an area in what is now the Netherlands. It takes its name from the feast day of Saint Elisabeth of Hungary which was formerly 19 November. During the night of 18–19 November 1421 a heavy storm near the North Sea coast caused the dikes to break in a number of places and the lower-lying polder land was flooded. A number of villages were swallowed by the flood and were lost, causing between 2,000 and 10,000 casualties. The dike breaks and floods caused widespread devastation in Zeeland and Holland.

The flood separated the cities of Geertruidenberg and Dordrecht which had previously fought against each other during the Hook and Cod (civil) wars.

== Reclaimed parts ==
Most of the area remained flooded for several decades. Reclaimed parts are the island of Dordrecht, the Hoeksche Waard island, and north-western North Brabant (around Geertruidenberg). Most of the actual National Park of Biesbosch area has been flooded since.

== Cause of the flood ==
The cause of the flood was a powerful extratropical cyclone. Water from the storm in the North Sea surged up the rivers causing the dikes to overflow and break through. The flood reached a large sea arm between south Holland and Zeeland (or Zealand), destroying the Grote Hollandse Waard. At the lower point where the flood water reached the city of Dordrecht is the point where flood water still remains today.

== Cat and cradle legend ==
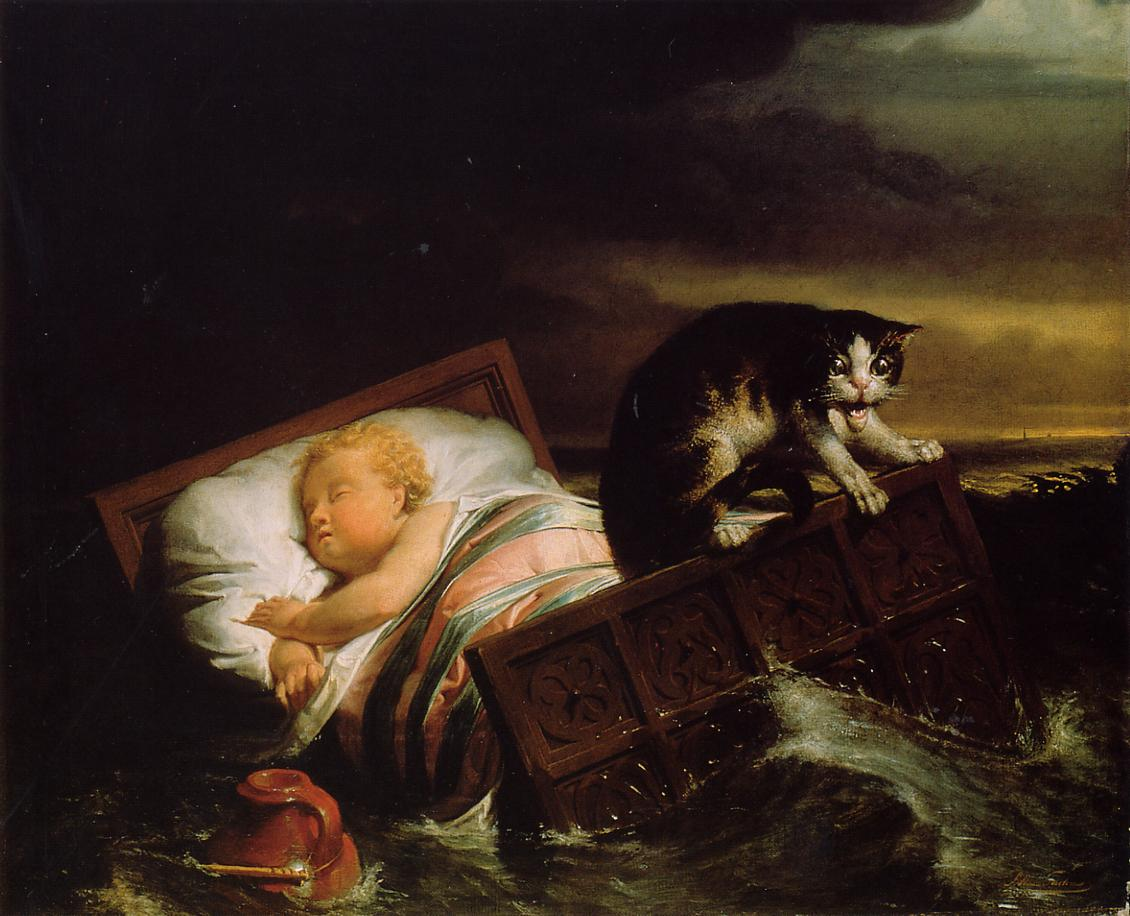
The Inundation of The Biesbosch in 1421 by Lawrence Alma-Tadema

According to legend, the water carried away a baby along with its crib and a cat. After the flood receded, people ventured out to assess the survivors. They spotted a cradle floating on the water and prepared for the worst: the chances of the baby surviving seemed slim. As the cradle approached the shore, they noticed a cat leaping frantically from one corner to another, desperately maintaining balance. It turned out, the cat's acrobatics managed to keep the crib upright, preventing it from overturning. The cat allegedly succeeded so well that even the peacefully sleeping baby's bedding remained dry. The artist Lawrence Alma-Tadema captured this legend in his 1856 painting "The Inundation of The Biesbosch". The baby was purportedly Beatrix de Rijke.

== See also ==
- St. Elizabeth's flood (1404)
- Hook and Cod wars – dispute between Geertruidenberg and Dordrecht
- List of floods in the Netherlands
- Kinderdijk
- Lists of disasters
