= Van Beuningen =

Surname list

Van Beuningen may refer to:

- Coenraad van Beuningen, (1622–1693) Dutch businessman and politician
- Geurt van Beuningen, (1565–1633) Dutch mayor
- Daniël George van Beuningen, (1877–1955) Dutch businessman
