= Keizersdijk =

Hamlet in the Netherlands

- Hamlet
- Location in the province of South Holland in the Netherlands Location in the Netherlands
- Coordinates: 51°45′25″N 4°32′51″E
- Country: Netherlands
- Province: South Holland
- Municipality: Hoeksche Waard

Keizersdijk is a hamlet in the province of South Holland, Netherlands, and is part of the municipality of Hoeksche Waard. It lies northwest of Strijen.

Keizersdijk is not a statistical entity, and considered part of Strijen. It has no place name signs, and consists of about 40 houses.
