= Schokland =

Schokland and Surroundings
UNESCO World Heritage Site
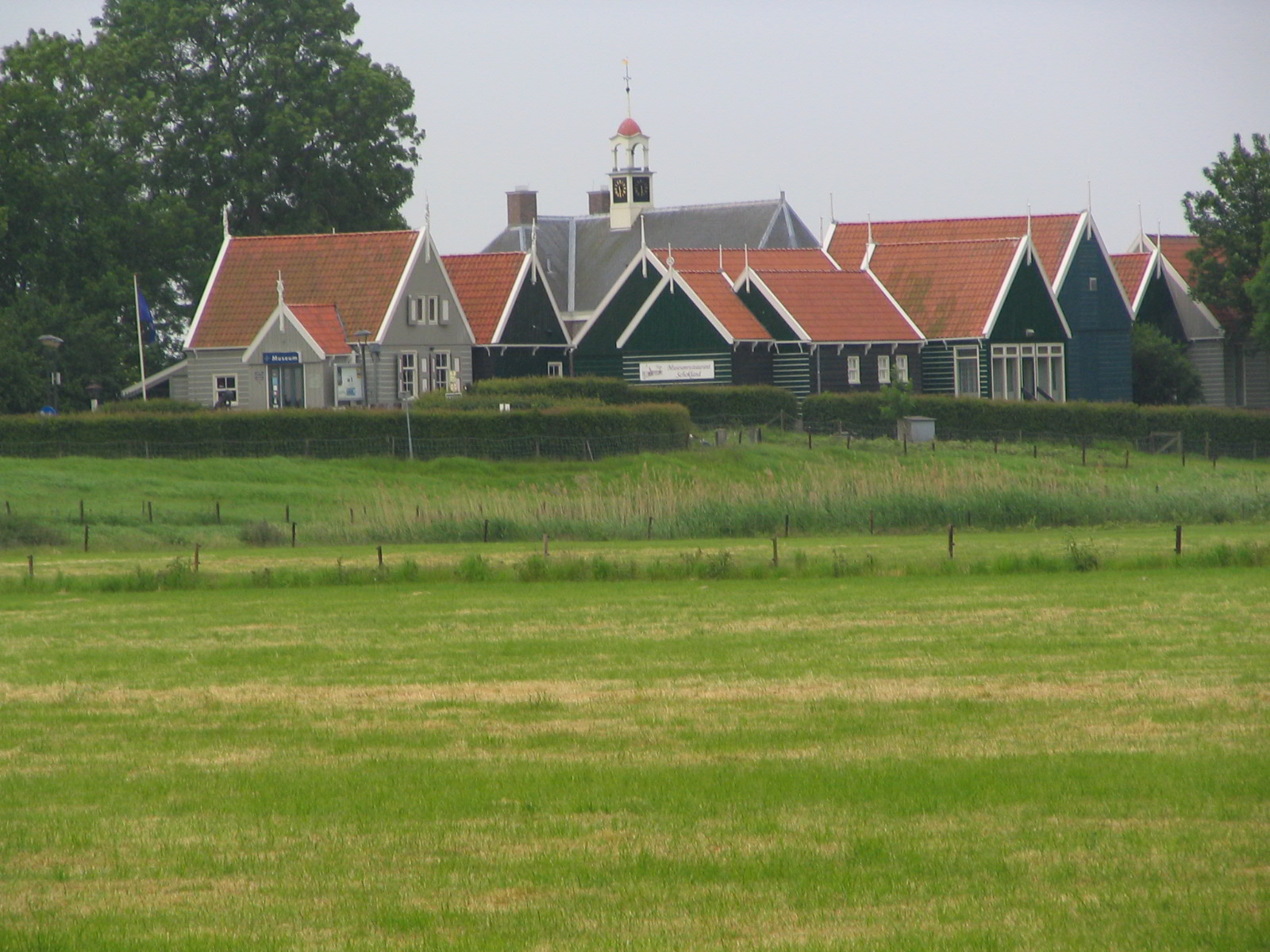
- The elevation of the former island is clearly visible

- Location within Netherlands
- Location: Noordoostpolder, Netherlands
- Criteria: Cultural: iii, v
- Reference: 739
- Inscription: 1995 (19th Session)
- Area: 1,306 ha (3,230 acres)
- Website: schokland.nl/en/
- Coordinates: 52.634183°N 5.777875°E

Schokland (Dutch pronunciation: [ˈsxɔklɑnt]) is a former island in the Dutch Zuiderzee, in the municipality of Noordoostpolder. Schokland was an elongated strip of peat land which ceased to be an island when the Noordoostpolder was reclaimed from the sea in 1942. It is now just a slightly elevated part of the polder, with a still partly intact retaining wall of the waterfront of Middelbuurt. On 1 April 2014, it had 8 inhabitants, but according to Statistics Netherlands there are five people living on the former island.

== History ==
Schokland was an attractive settlement area in the Middle Ages when it was much larger. By the 19th century, it was under continuous threat of flooding due to the rise in sea level. By then the Schoklanders had retreated to the three most elevated parts: Emmeloord, Molenbuurt, and Middelbuurt. A major flood in 1825 brought massive destruction, and in 1859 the government decided to end permanent settlement on Schokland. The former municipality of Schokland was joined to Kampen on the mainland.

Today Schokland is a popular archeological site and host to the Museum Schokland. Schokland was the first UNESCO World Heritage Site in the Netherlands.

== Public transportation ==
The nearest railway stations are in Kampen and Dronten.

Bus service 682 operates from Kampen and serves Schokland.

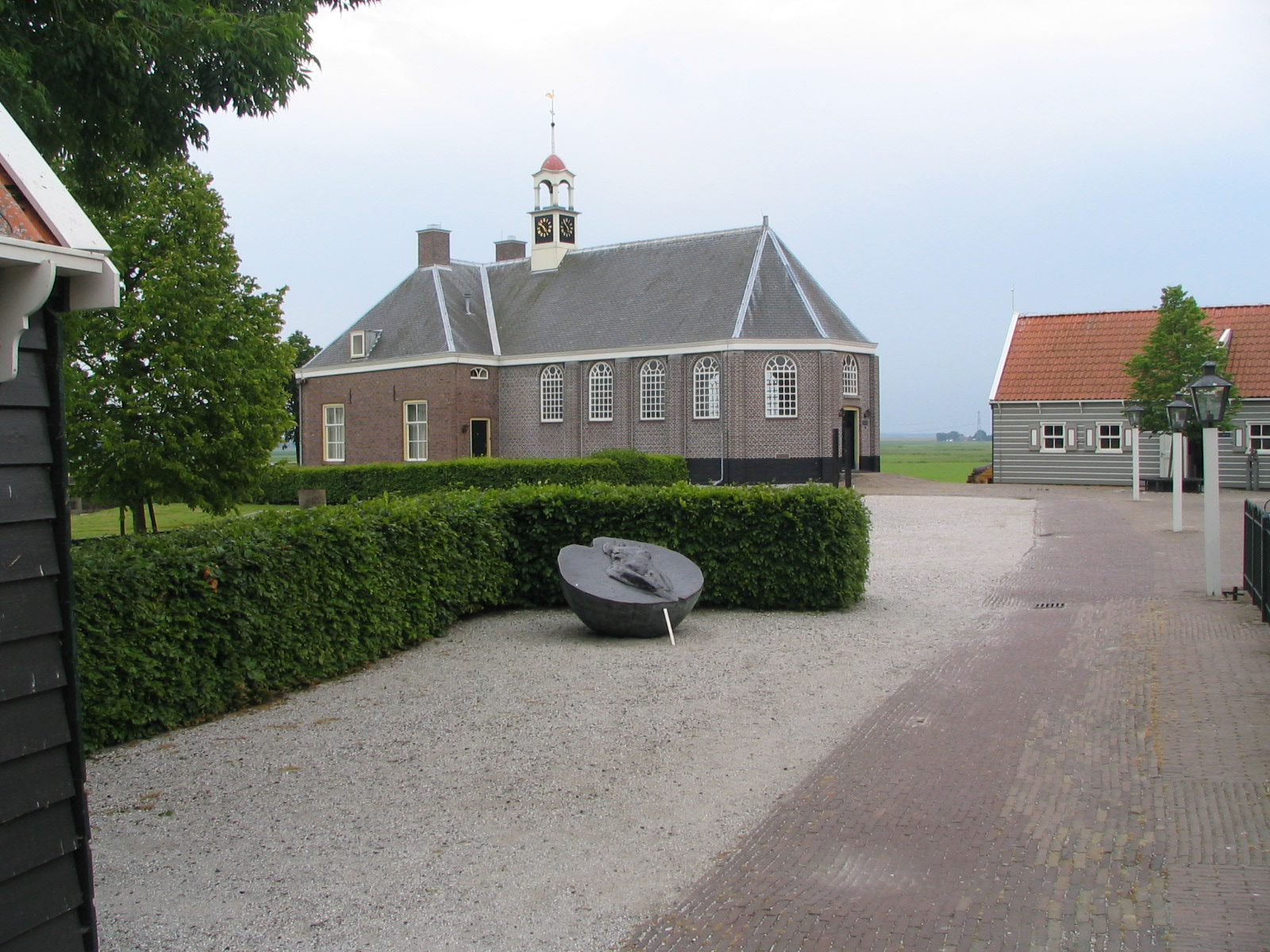
Church of Schokland at Middelbuurt

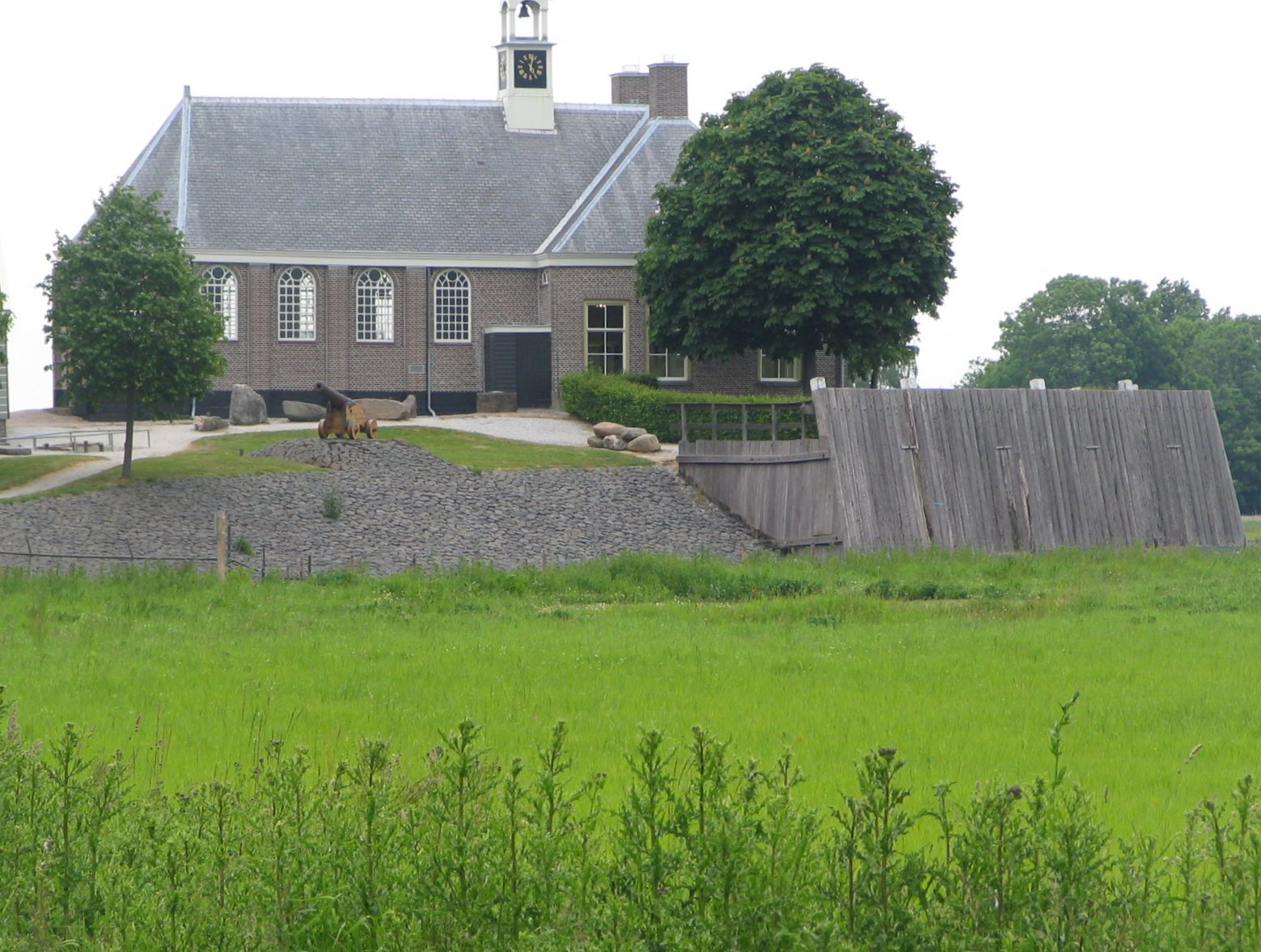
Church with sea wall

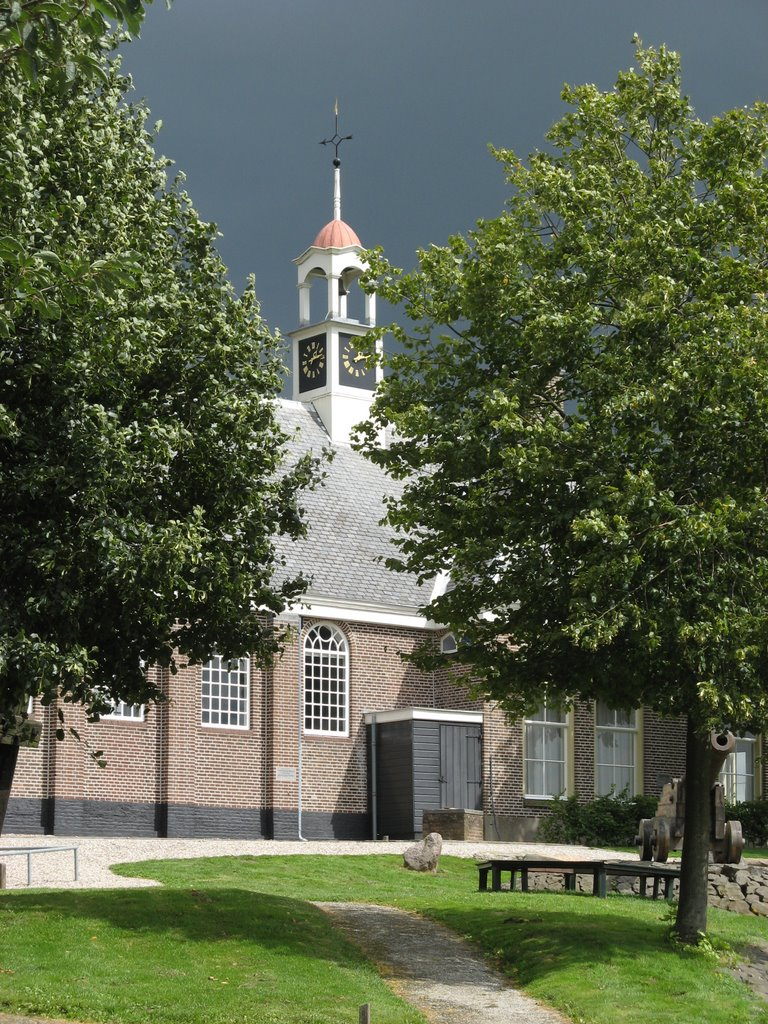
Church

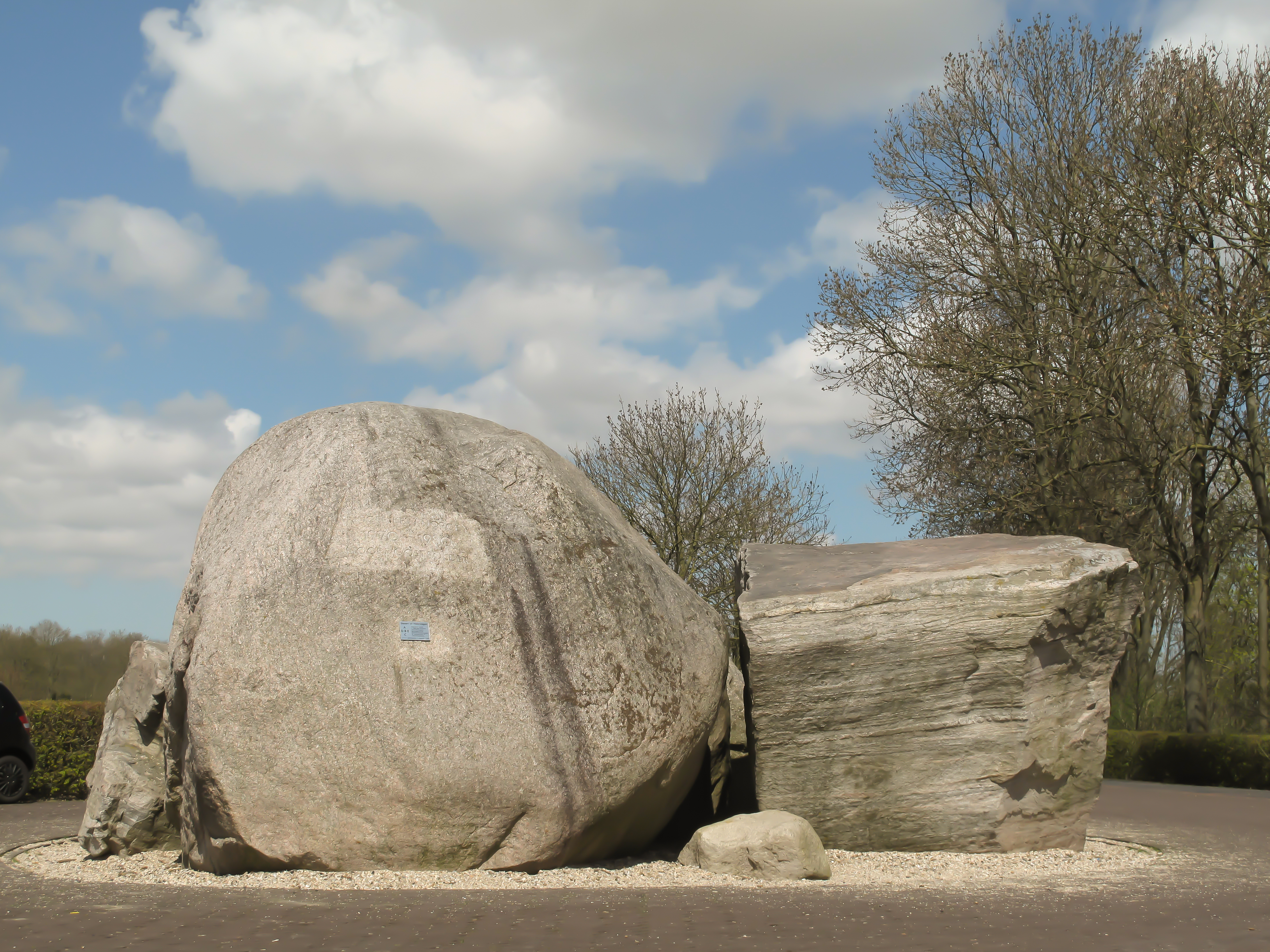
Glacial erratic. The label on the left stone shows the Dutch for "Stones from Norway".

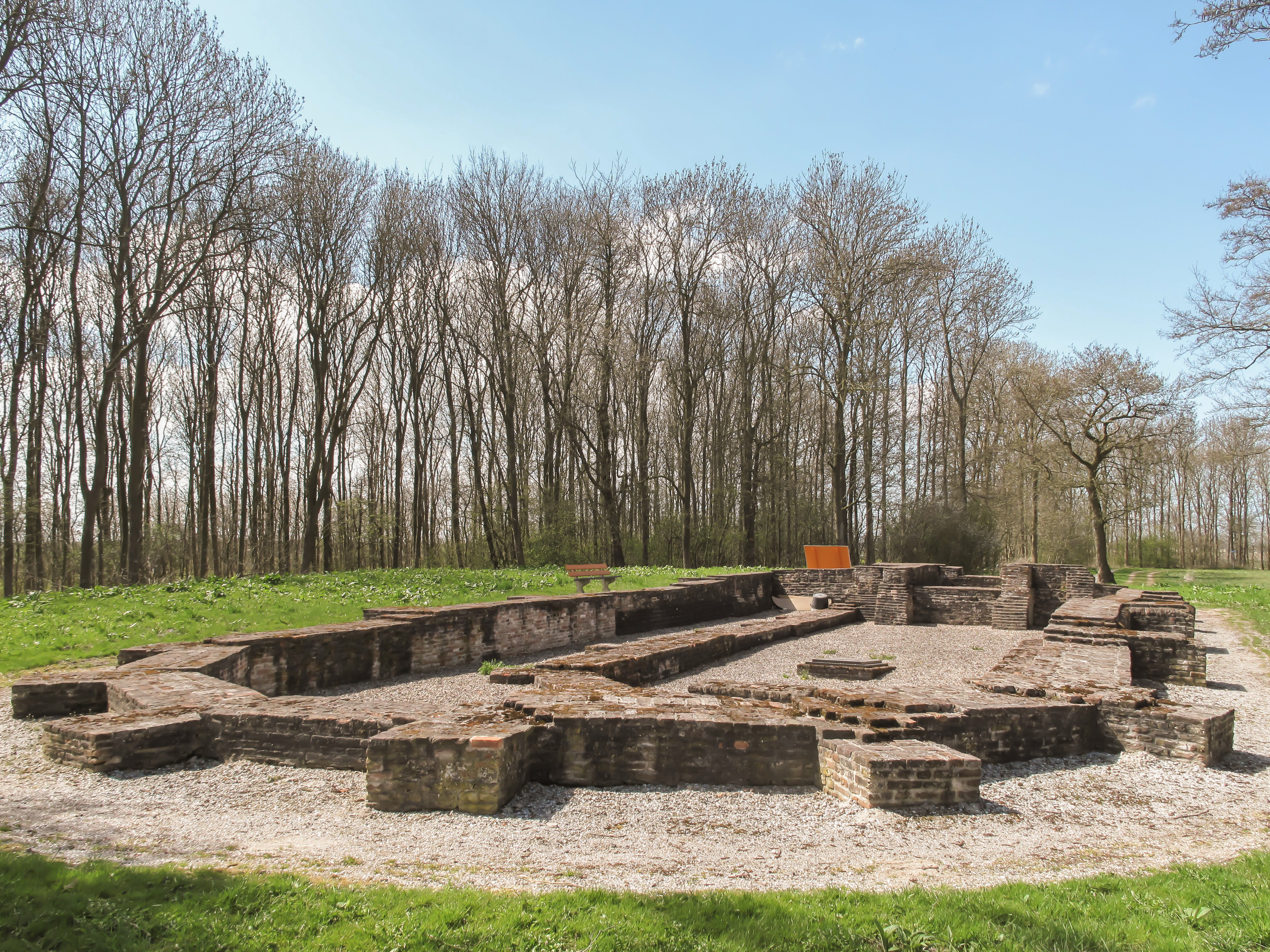
Church ruins at Ens

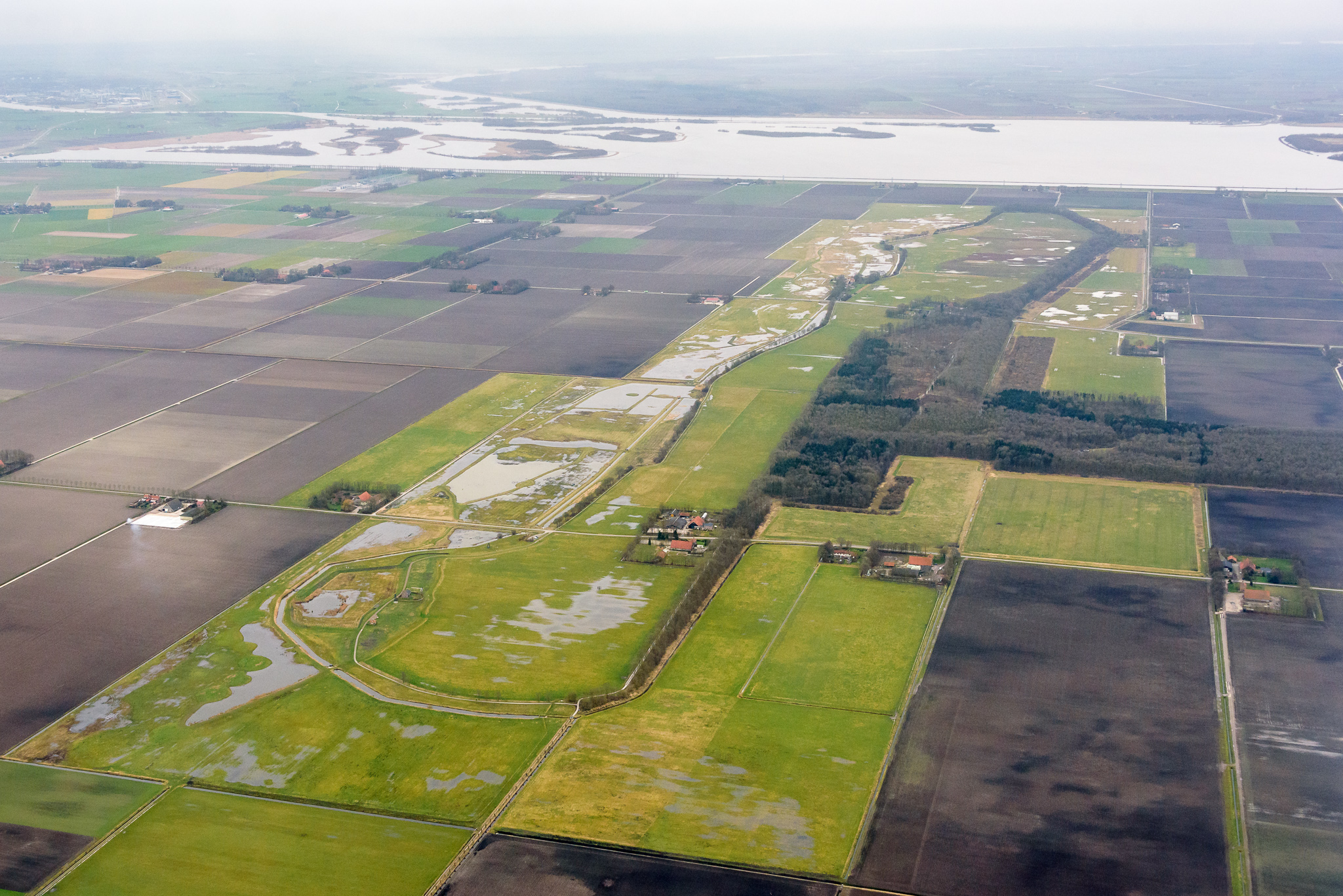
Schokland seen from the north

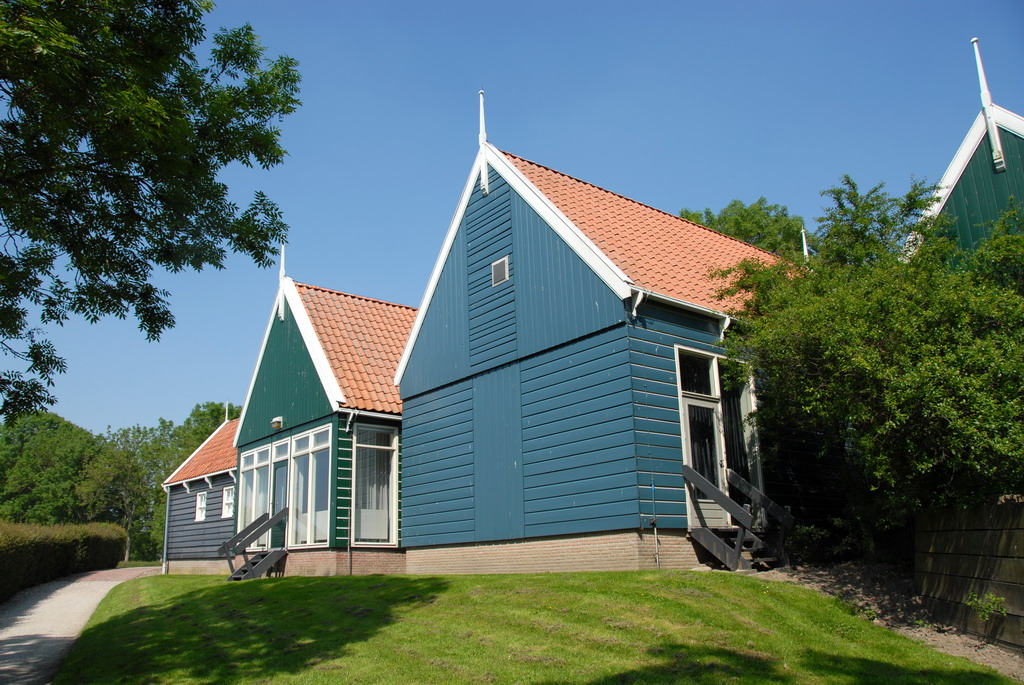
Schokland Museum houses
