= Schuring =

Schuring is a surname. Notable people with the surname include:

- Kirk Schuring (1952–2024), American politician
- Morris Schuring (born 2005), Dutch racing driver
- Romana Schuring (born 1995), Dutch gymnast
- Yvonne Schuring (born 1978), Austrian sprint canoer

== See also ==
- Schure, another surname
