= Verdronken Land van Reimerswaal =

Area of flood-covered land in Zeeland, Netherlands

Coordinates: 51.4487°N 4.23145°E

Coat of Arms of Reimerswaal

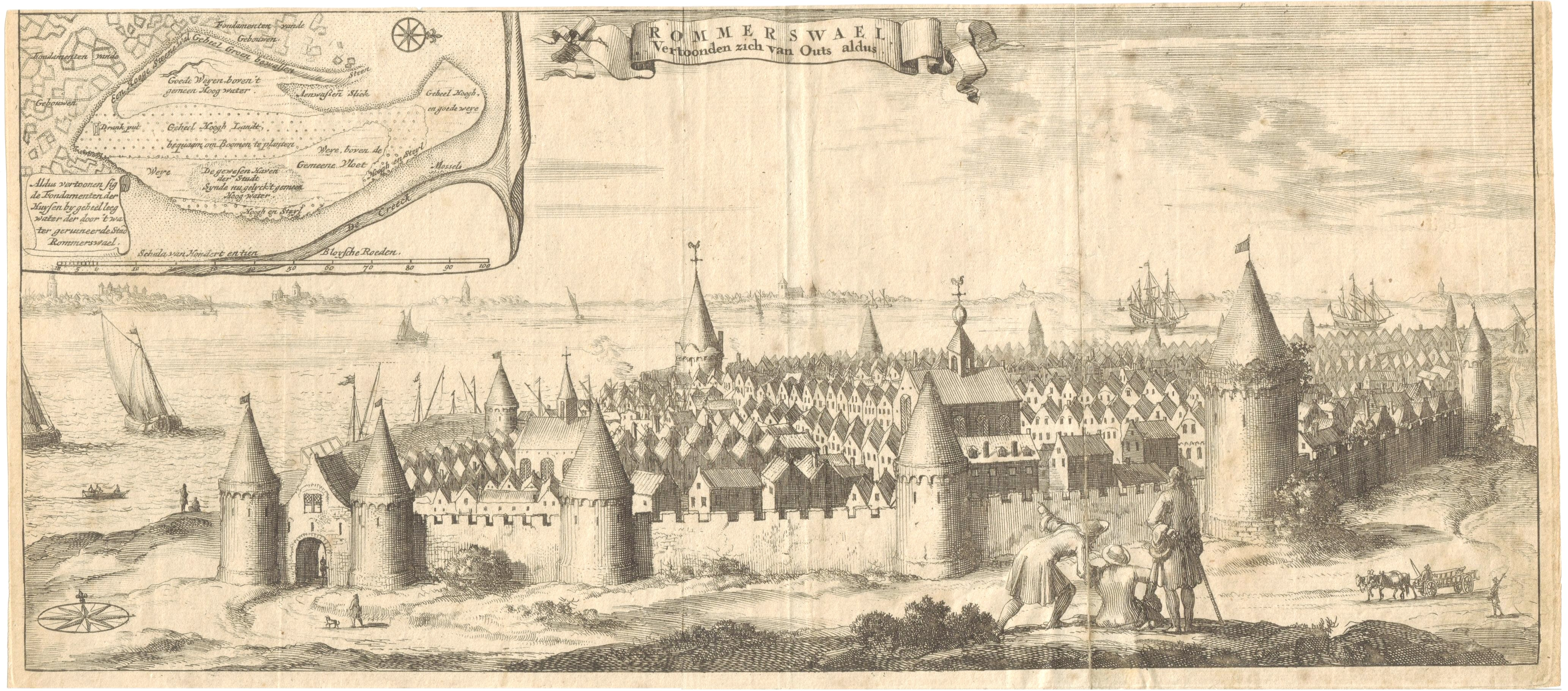
Reimerswaal before 1570.

Het Verdronken Land van Reimerswaal (translation: The Drowned Land of Reimerswaal) is an area of flood-covered land in Zeeland in the Netherlands between Noord Beveland and Bergen op Zoom. Some of it was lost in the St. Felix's Flood in 1530, and some of it in 1532. The Oosterschelde formerly flowed along its east and north edges. It is sometimes divided into the "Verdronken Land van Zuid-Beveland" and the "Verdronken Land van de Markiezaat van Bergen op Zoom". Verdronken is Dutch for "drowned", and Markizaat van Bergen op Zoom is the marquisate of Bergen op Zoom).

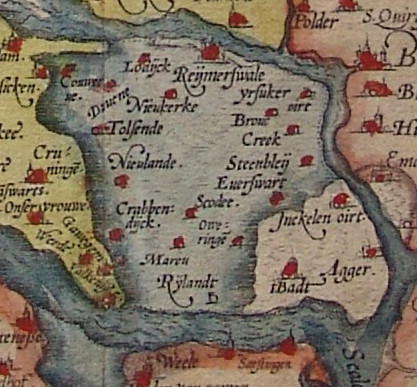
Selected part of the map "Zelandicarum Insularum Exactissima Et Nova Descriptio, Auctore D. Iacobo A Daventria" showing the drowned land of Reimerswaal

The Dutch land reclamation engineer and writer Vierlingh blamed the loss of that land on a landowner called the Lord of Lodijke neglecting a tidal creek which was scouring at every tide. After the land was lost, the city of Reimerswaal survived on a small island for a while.

== See also ==
- Drowned villages in the Drowned Land of Reimerswaal
- List of settlements lost to floods in the Netherlands
