= Schoondijke =

- Village
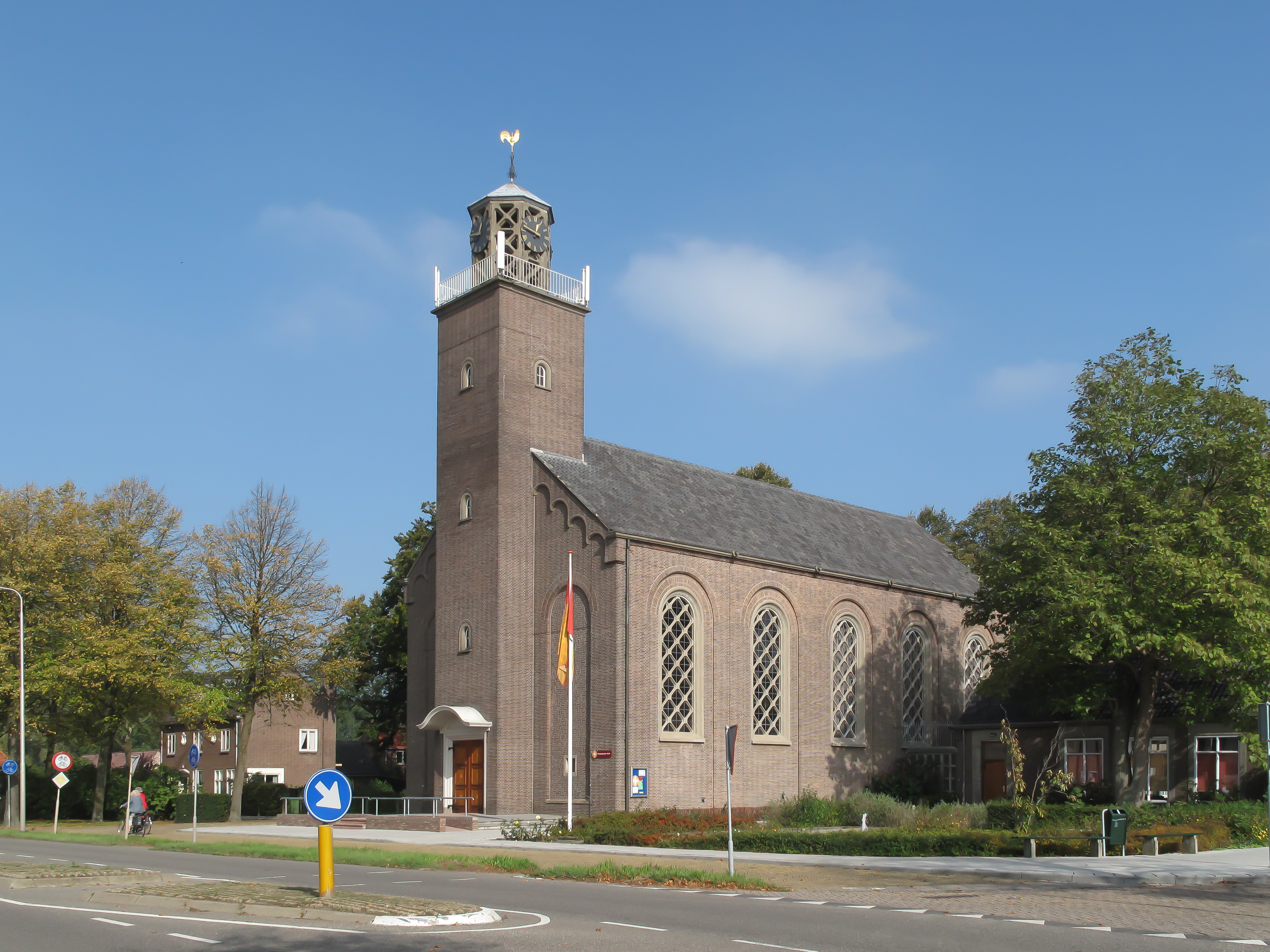
- Dutch Reformed church

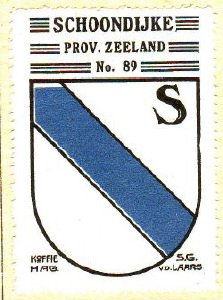
- Coat of arms

- Location in the province of Zeeland in the Netherlands Schoondijke (Netherlands)
- Coordinates: 51°21′14″N 3°33′15″E
- Country: Netherlands
- Province: Zeeland
- Municipality: Sluis

Area
  - Total: 13.58 km^{2} (5.24 sq mi)
- Elevation: 1.7 m (5.6 ft)

Population (2021)
  - Total: 1,360
  - Density: 100/km^{2} (259/sq mi)
- Time zone: UTC+1 (CET)
  - Summer (DST): UTC+2 (CEST)
- Postal code: 4507
- Dialing code: 0117

Schoondijke is a village in the Dutch province of Zeeland. It is located in the municipality of Sluis, about 5 km south of Breskens.

== History ==
Originally, the village was called Wlendike from 1150 onwards, and means "dirty dike". From 1250 onwards it was called "in Sconendiic" and means "clean dike". The old village disappeared between 1583 and 1585 when the land was inundated. In 1652, it was founded for a second time.

The grist mill Hulsters Molen was built in 1884, but was damaged by fire and rebuilt in 1900. In 1944, it was damaged by war, but still able to operate. It was in use until 1970. It was restored and used on a voluntary basis.

Schoondijke was home to 1,648 people in 1840. Schoondijke was severely damaged by war in 1944, and most of the village has been rebuilt. It was a separate municipality until 1970, when it was merged with Oostburg. In 2013, it became part of the municipality of Sluis.

The renovation plan 'Schwondieka 2020' issued by Project Destination Unknown should have been finished by the end of 2020 but got delayed heavily due to the worldwide COVID-19 pandemic.

== Gallery ==
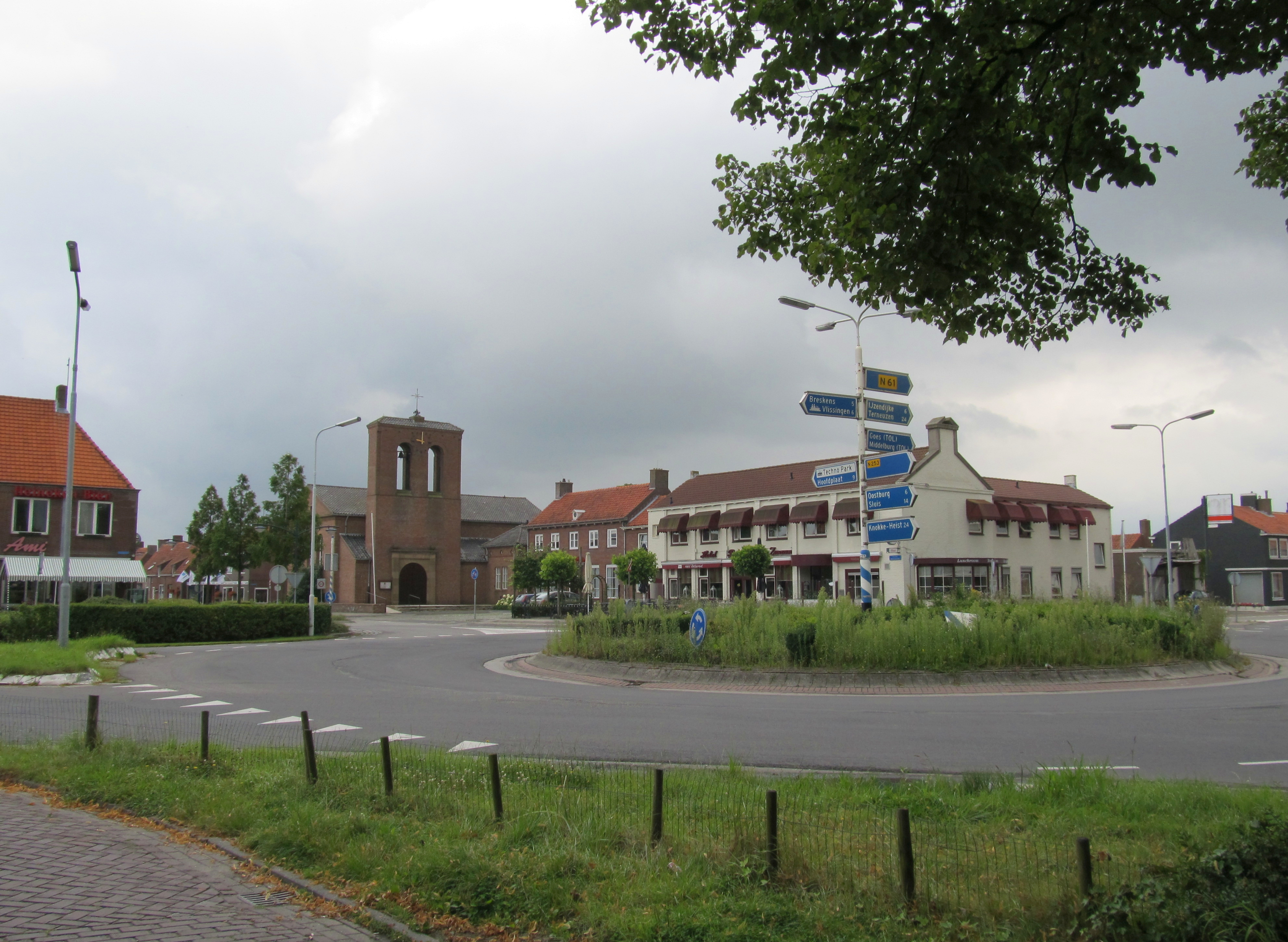
Village view

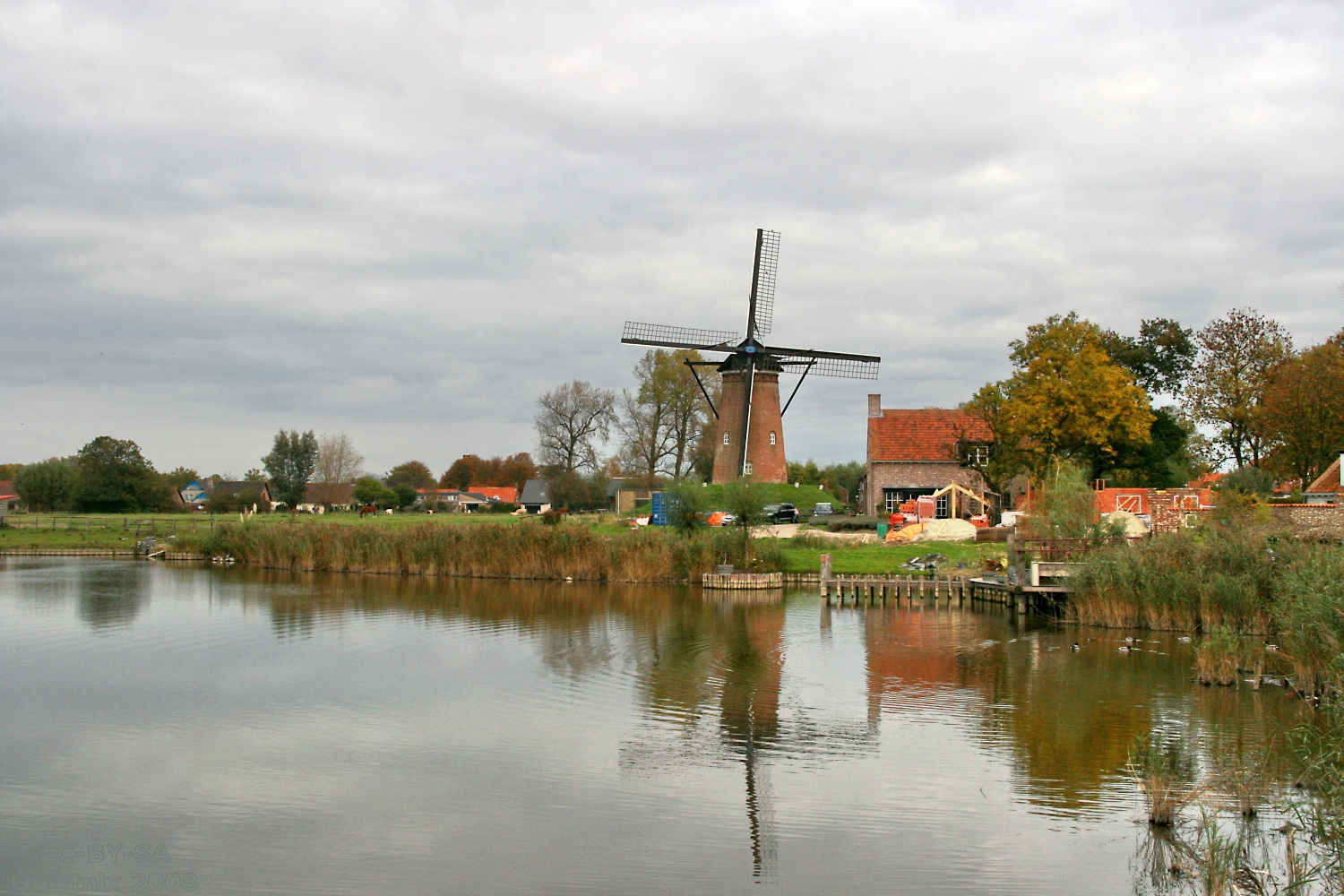
View on the Hulster Molen from the water
