= Schouwen =

Former island in Zeeland, the Netherlands

Coordinates: 51°43′6″N 3°47′35″E

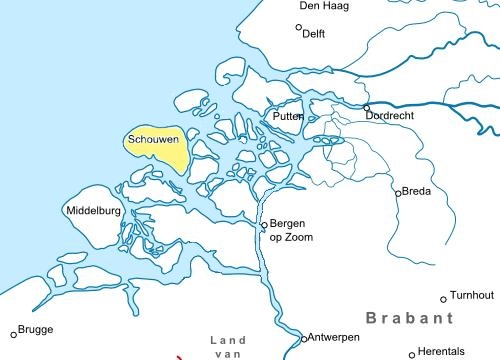
Location of Schouwen around 1350

Schouwen is the name of a former island of the Dutch province of Zeeland.

The island of Schouwen was joined to Duiveland in 1610, forming the island of Schouwen-Duiveland. It is the western part of the current island.
