= Reimerswaal (city) =

Lost city in the Netherlands

Coordinates: 51°30′27″N 4°10′21″E

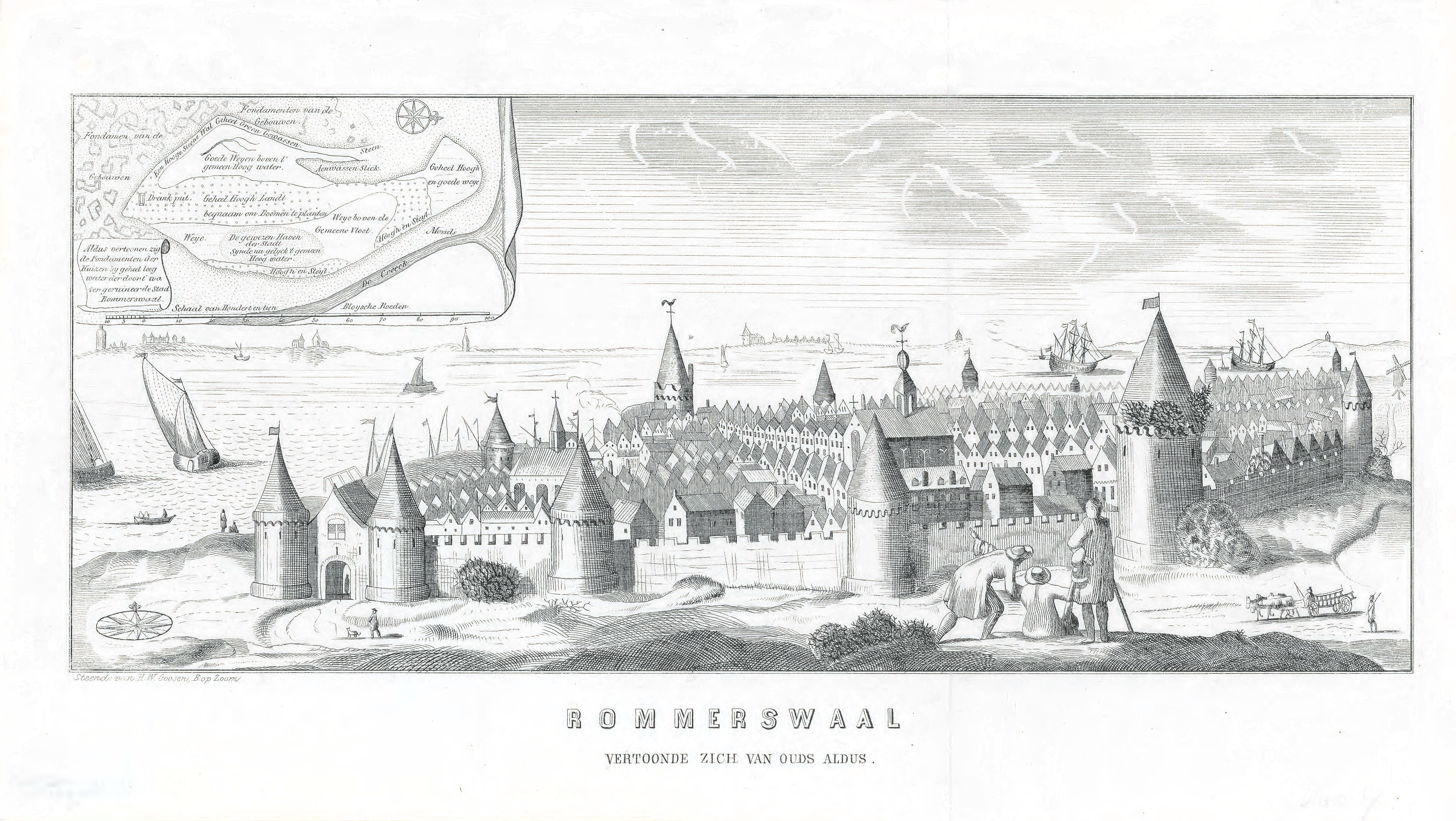
The old town of Reimerswaal

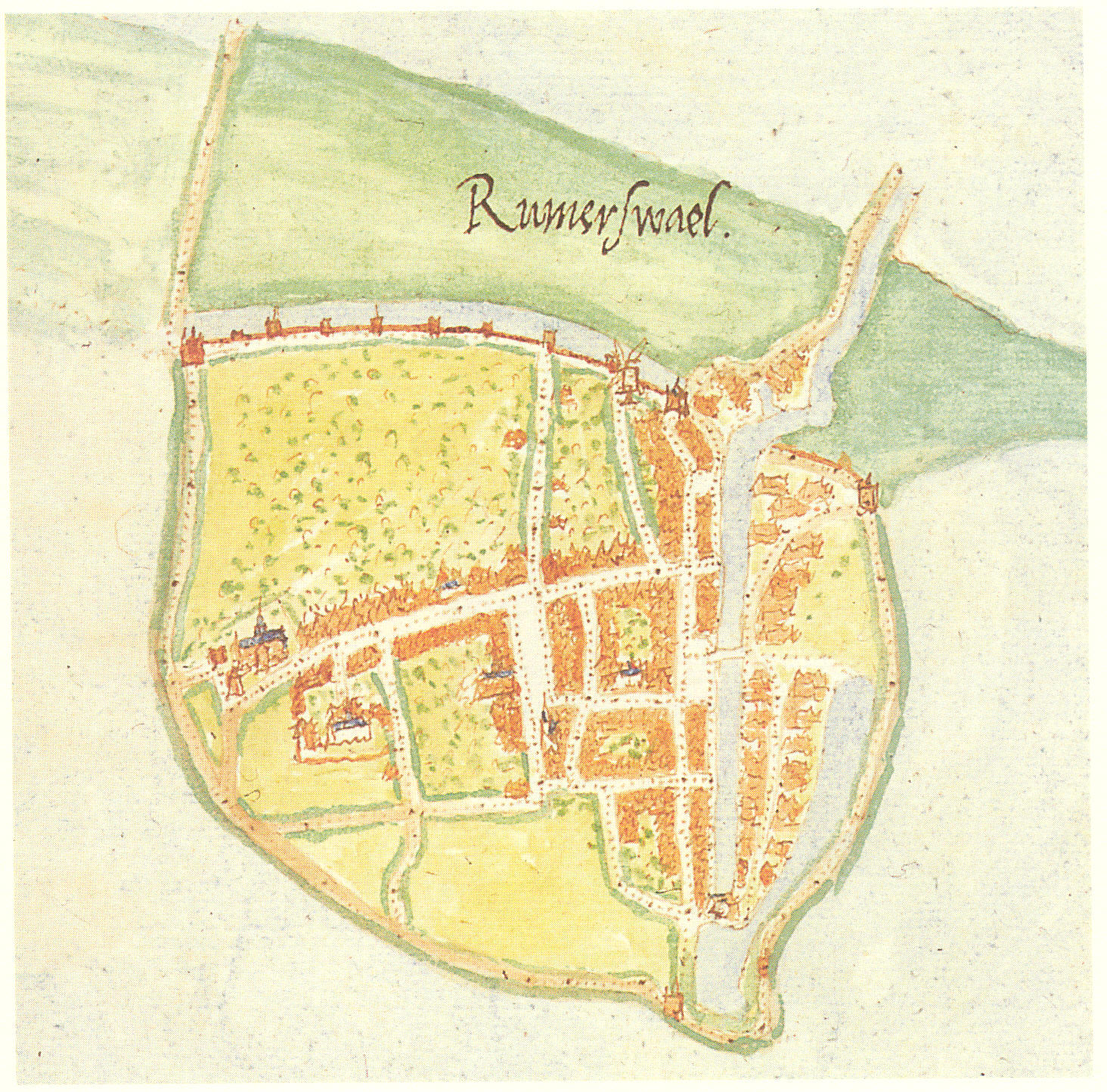
Reimerswaal map from a 1560 atlas

Reimerswaal (Dutch pronunciation: [ˌrɛimərsˈʋaːl]) is a lost city in the Netherlands. The present-day municipality of Reimerswaal is named after this city, which was granted city rights in 1374. The city was destroyed by repeated floods, and the last citizens left in 1632. Nothing remains. It was located north of the current municipality, on the east end of the Oosterschelde, on land which is now called the Verdronken Land van Reimerswaal ("Drowned Land of Reimerswaal"). The site of the city has been recognized as a national archeological monument and is buried under the Oesterdam.
