= Wulpen (island) =

Coordinates: 51°24′27″N 3°28′30″E

Wulpen was once an isle in the estuary of the Western Scheldt, between the island of Walcheren and the western part of Zeelandic Flanders. It was flooded and submerged by the major storm surge of 1404.

At its peak, the island had four villages and the city Waterdunen that had economic relations with the cities of Bruges and Sluis. Because of the silting up of the Zwin (the only water passage to Bruges) after the storm surge of 1404, the prosperity of the city decreased. On the other hand the flooding opened the Westerscheldt as a seaway to Antwerp.
