= Kreekrakdam =

Dam in the Netherlands

Coordinates: 51°25′48″N 4°14′50″E

The Kreekrakdam is a 3.5 km long dam, that was constructed from 1861 to 1867 as a necessary part of the Roosendaal–Vlissingen railway, the so-called Zeeuwse Lijn (Zealandic Line). Additionally this dam connected the island of Zuid-Beveland with the mainland of Brabant across the Kreekrak waterway.

== Location ==
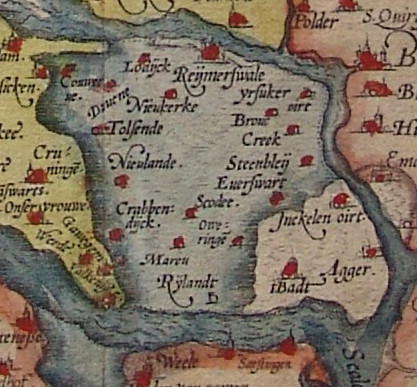
Selected part of the map "Zelandicarum Insularum Exactissima Et Nova Descriptio, Auctore D. Iacobo A Daventria" showing the drowned land of Reimerswaal in 1580

The Kreekrak was a waterway between the easternside of Zuid-Beveland and the mainland of Brabant close to Woensdrecht. Before the sixteenth century the island of Zuid-Beveland was much larger, but due to the St. Felix's flood in 1530 and especially the St. Pontianus' flood of 1552 the Drowned land of Reimerswaal arose and large pieces of the island sank beneath the waves.

Due to the graduate silting up of mudflats some of the lost land could be reclaimed. This restricted the flow of the Scheldt River to the Eastern Scheldt to ultimately a narrow channel.

== The dam ==
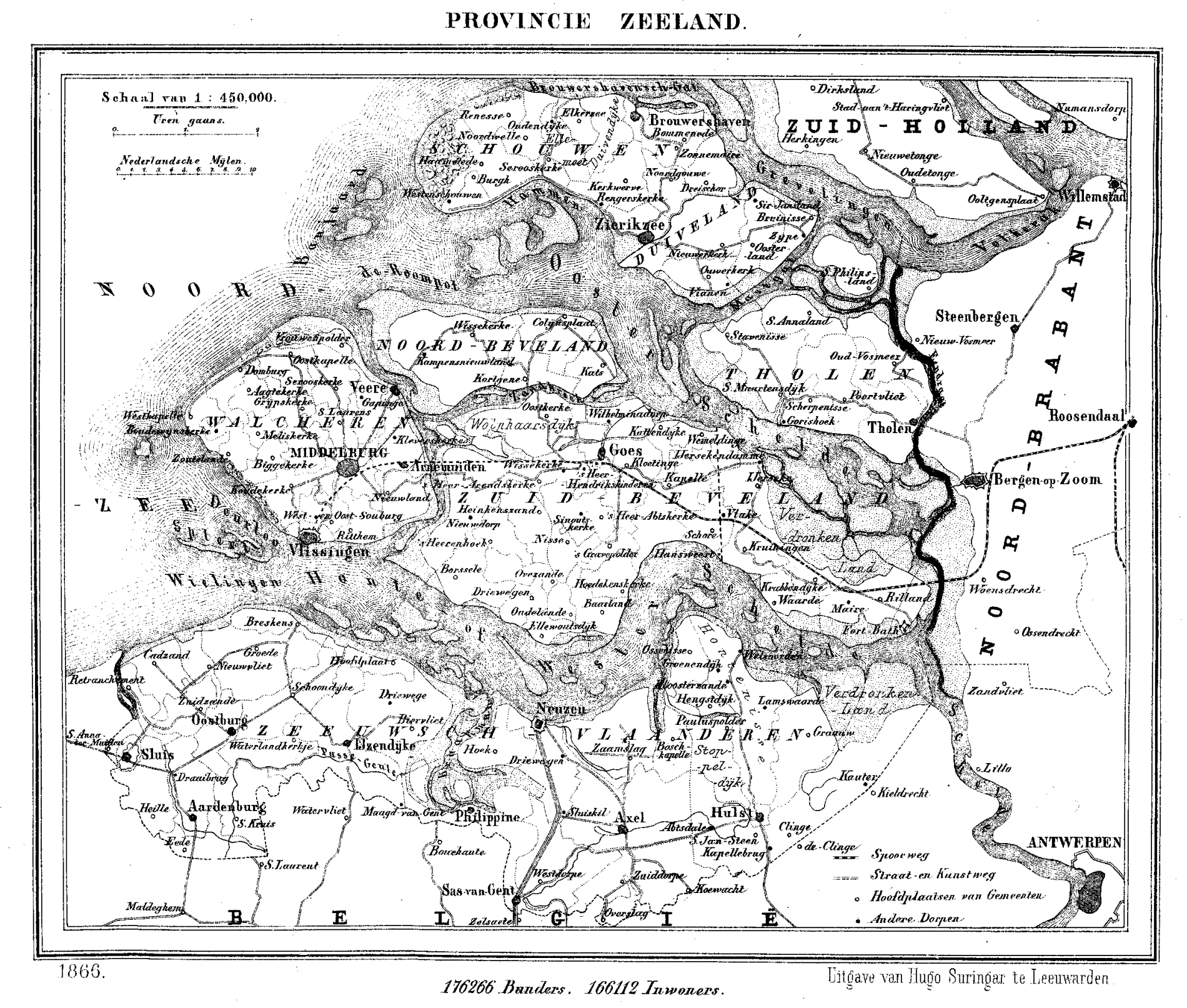
Kuypers Gemeente Atlas Zeeland 1865–1870. The railway up to Goes is finished, the railway to Vlissingen, only completed in 1873, is marked with a dotted line. (Just as the Canal through Zuid-Beveland, opened in 1866).

Already in 1810 there were plans to dam the Kreekrak (as well as the Sloe). These plans were made by order of Napoleon. However, soon after he lost power in the Netherlands, with which the plans were cancelled.

In 1840 there were plans to construct a railway from Vlissingen in the west, to the mainland in the east. To realise this it was needed to make a connection through or over the Sloe and the Kreekrak. Long bridges were hardly possible at the time, so it was decided to construct dams.

It was not until twenty years later, in 1860, that permission was granted. This long period can be accounted to a few reasons. Firstly, there was the fear that Vlissingen could be new competition for the port of Rotterdam, which had better connections to the hinterland. Secondly, in the Treaty of London it was decided that recently independent Belgium should keep having free passage from the Port of Antwerp to the Netherlands. For large vessels this was possible through the Western Scheldt and the North Sea, but for smaller vessels it had always been possible to navigate the, partially silted, Sloe and Kreekrak to more northern parts of the Netherlands, without having to go out on open sea.

In 1860 however, a new spoorwegenwet (Railway Law) was passed by the Dutch government, which prohibited the hindrance of railway construction.

Initially the plan was to build a dam in which a 600-meter bridge was incorporated. This would have allowed smaller ships to still pass through the Kreekrak. Eventually the implementation with just a dam was deemed to be technically better feasible. Objections from Belgium were overcome by the construction of the Canal through Zuid-Beveland. The construction could begin and the dam was officially opened on 1 June 1867. At the time with just a railway, later a road was constructed. Within fifty years, there were polders constructed on both sides of the dam.

== Trivia ==
- By the closing of the Kreekrak, the heavily polluted water from the Scheldt could no longer reach the Eastern Scheldt. Which had a major positive consequence for its water quality.
- The Kreekrakdam was, after initial plans at its construction, still cut through by the construction of the Scheldt-Rhine Canal from 1967 to 1976.
- With the construction of the A58 motorway, the main route from and to Zuid-Beveland was relocated from the northern, to the southern side of the railway. The provincial N289 road N289 road (Netherlands) (on the northern side of the railway) is now called the Oude Rijksweg (Old State Highway).
