= Canal through Zuid-Beveland =

Canal in Netherlands

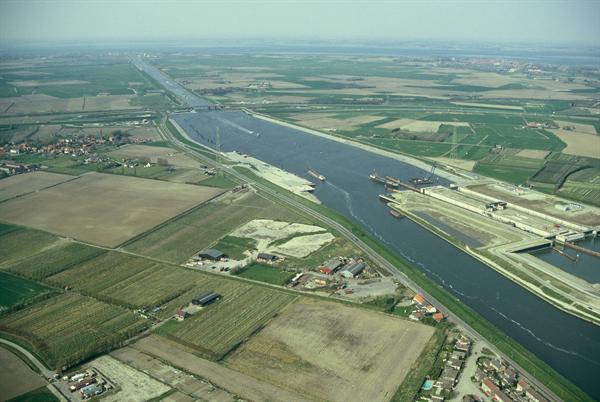
- Aerial view of the northern parts of the canal
- Interactive map of Canal through Zuid-Beveland
- Country: Netherlands

Specifications
- Length: 9 kilometres (5.6 miles; 4.9 nautical miles)
- Lock length: 280 m (919 ft)
- Lock width: 24 m (79 ft)
- Maximum boat length: 200 m (656 ft)
- Maximum boat beam: 23.5 m (77.1 ft)
- Maximum boat draft: 4.8 m (15.7 ft) (depending on the tide)
- Maximum boat air draft: 44 m (144 ft) (due to power lines)
- Locks: 1 x 2 (originally 2 x 3)
- Status: operational
- Navigation authority: Rijkswaterstaat

History
- Construction began: 1863
- Date completed: 1866

Geography
- Start point: Eastern Scheldt river, Netherlands
- End point: Western Scheldt river, Netherlands
- Beginning coordinates: 51°31′10″N 4°0′56″E
- Ending coordinates: 51°26′21″N 4°0′39″E

The Canal through Zuid-Beveland (Dutch: Kanaal door Zuid-Beveland) in the southwest Netherlands is the westernmost of two canals crossing the Zuid-Beveland peninsula. It connects the Western Scheldt near Hansweert (to the south of the canal) via a lock complex and the Eastern Scheldt (to the north) with which it has an open connection.

== History ==
Planning for faster and more reliable route between the Port of Antwerp and the Rhine began with Napoleon I, but this planning was interrupted by the declaration of the Kingdom of the Netherlands in 1815, and by the Belgian Revolution in 1830, issues which took precedence over the development of a new waterwater. With the Treaty of London in 1839, which recognized the independence of Belgium, provisions were included that dealt with cooperation between the Netherlands and Belgium concerning how shipping between Antwerp and the Rhine would be handled; the Netherlands was obligated to keep a connection open between the two.

The planning for a new canal through Zuid-Beveland began anew when in the late 1850s, the Netherlands decided to build the Roosendaal–Vlissingen railway, which necessitated the damming of the only two inland connections between the Western Scheldt and the Eastern Scheldt: the Kreekrak and the Sloe. Construction began on the Kanaal door Zuid-Beveland stretching between Wemeldinge and Hansweert in 1863 and the canal was inaugurated on October 15, 1866. The canal's traffic quickly grew, and another navigation lock apiece were added at each end to reduce congestion in 1872, and yet another lock was added in 1916 at Hansweert and one at Wemeldinge in 1928.

Even as far back as the 1920s, Belgium had begun seeking a more direct route and more modern canal between Antwerp in the Rhine. Belgium and the Netherlands negotiated for decades over the location and specifications of a new canal, and in 1963 the Scheldt-Rhine Canal began construction which was opened in 1975. However, the Canal through South Beveland remained as a secondary route for tall ships which could not navigate under the lift gates of the Kreekraksluizen and the fixed bridges over the Scheldt-Rhine Canal. It was decided in 1976 to modernize this canal, as well, which included widening it, replacing the old locks at Hansweert with modern ones, and abandoning in place the locks at Wemeldinge, since the agreement with Belgium specified that there could only be three locks between Antwerp and the Rhine. The new locks at Hansweert were opened December 2, 1987 and the reconstruction of the northern end of the canal - which relocated the entrance further east - was completed in 1993.

The abandonment of the locks at Wemeldinge left the water level of the canal subject to the tides of the Eastern Scheldt, though these had been reduced by the Eastern Scheldt storm surge barrier, especially to the level of the tides in the Western Scheldt.

== Connections ==
The canal is crossed by the Postbrug (which carries N670), a railroad bridge (which carries the Roosendaal–Vlissingen railway), and the Vlake Tunnel (which carries the A58 motorway). In addition, there are two small road bridges built on rollers (one over the southern end of the western lock chamber, and one over the northern end of the eastern lock chamber) which are used by pedestrians, cyclists and horseman.

== Amenities ==
At Wemeldinge, the abandoned middle lock was filled in, but the locks on either side were transformed into a marina: the Jachthaven Wemeldinge.

== Gallery ==
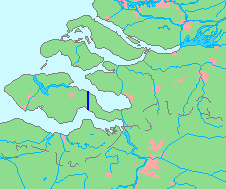
The route of the Canal through Zuid-Beveland

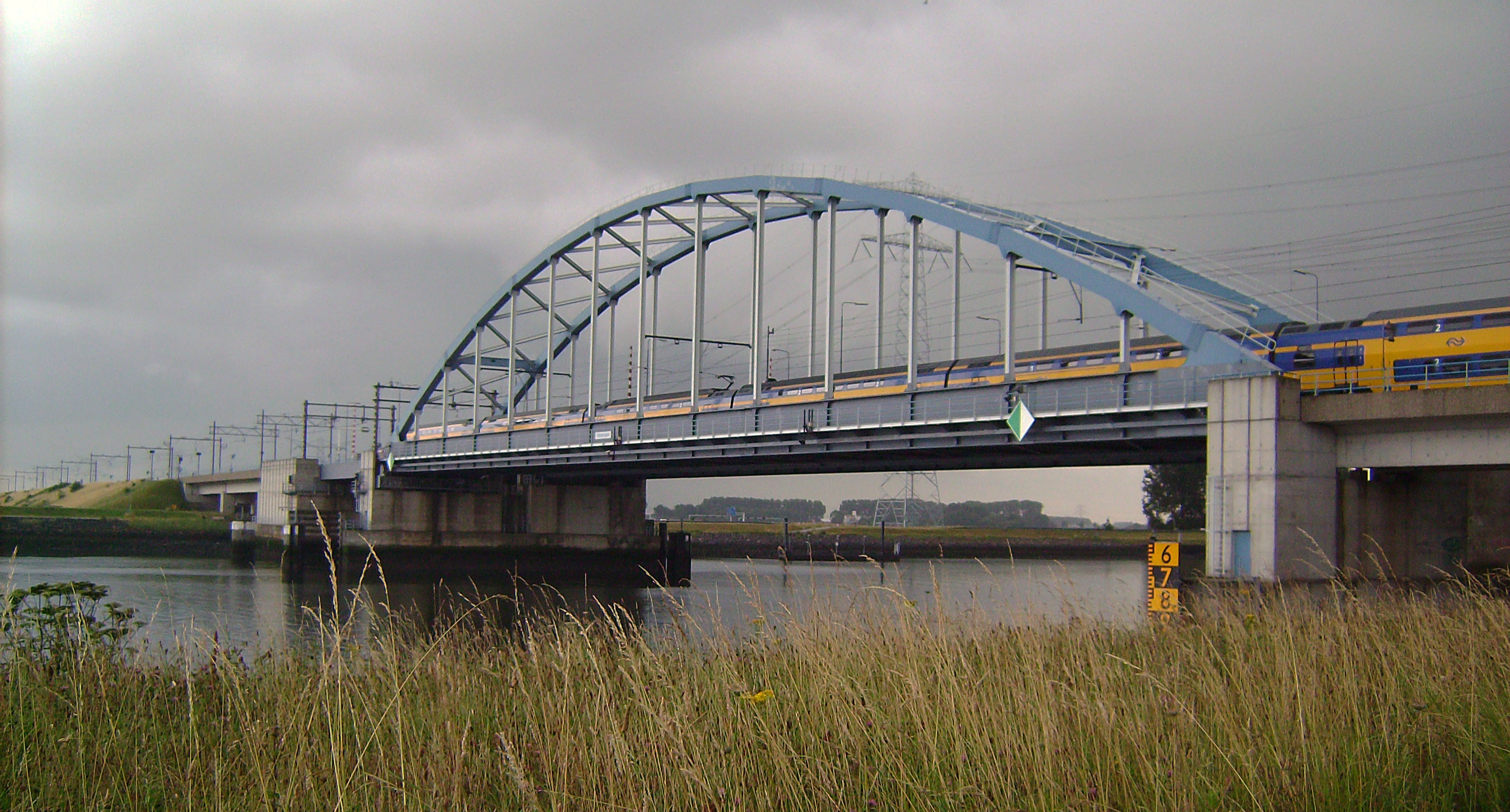
Railroad bridge over the Canal through Zuid-Beveland

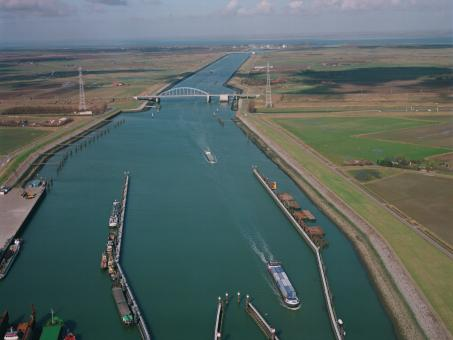
Canal through Zuid-Beveland (south side), showing entrance to the locks
