= Canal through Walcheren =

Canal in Netherlands

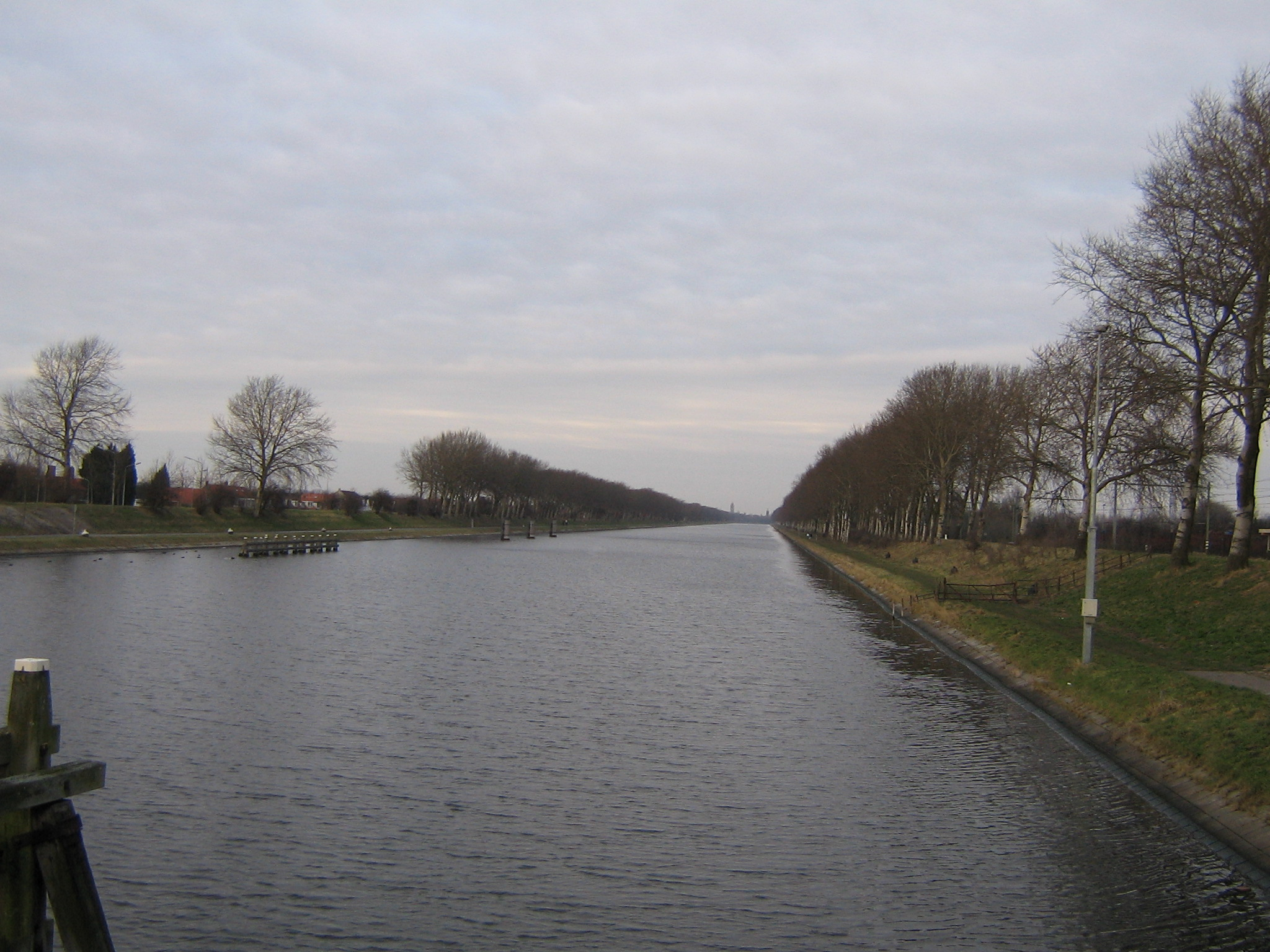
- Looking toward Middelburg from a bridge at Souburg.
- Country: The Netherlands

Specifications
- Length: 16 kilometres (9.9 miles; 8.6 nautical miles)
- Lock length: 140.7 m (462 ft)
- Lock width: 23.4 m (77 ft)
- Maximum boat length: 130 m (427 ft)
- Maximum boat beam: 18 m (59.1 ft)
- Maximum boat draft: 4.5 m (14.8 ft)
- Maximum boat air draft: no limit
- Original number of locks: 2 x 2 + safety lock gates
- Status: operational
- Navigation authority: Province Zeeland

History
- Construction began: 1870
- Date completed: 1873

Geography
- Start point: Veerse Meer at Veere
- End point: Western Scheldt at Vlissingen
- Beginning coordinates: 51°32′51.6″N 3°40′20″E
- Ending coordinates: 51°26′20″N 3°36′11″E
- Branch(es): Arnekanaal, Middelburg harbour
- Connects to: Arnemuiden and Nieuw- en Sint Joosland

The Canal through Walcheren in the Netherlands crosses the east of Walcheren. It connects the Westerschelde and the Veerse Meer.

== Context ==
In the 15th and 16th century Middelburg, capital of Zeeland was booming. The city was on Walcheren Island, and had a connection to the sea just to the east via the small river Arne. In 1535 the Havenkanaal was opened, and Middelburg continued in prosperity. However, in the 17th and 18th century Middelburg's connections to the sea all silted up.

In 1809 King Louis Bonaparte decided to construct the New Harbor Canal, which connected Middelburg to Veere. After the annexation by France this work was halted. After independence was regained in 1813, work continued. It was made possible by a national subsidy (a loan without interest) of 1,000,000 guilders. Middelburg would repay 25,000 guilders a year. The canal was opened in August 1817, but the prosperity of Middelburg was not restored.

== History ==
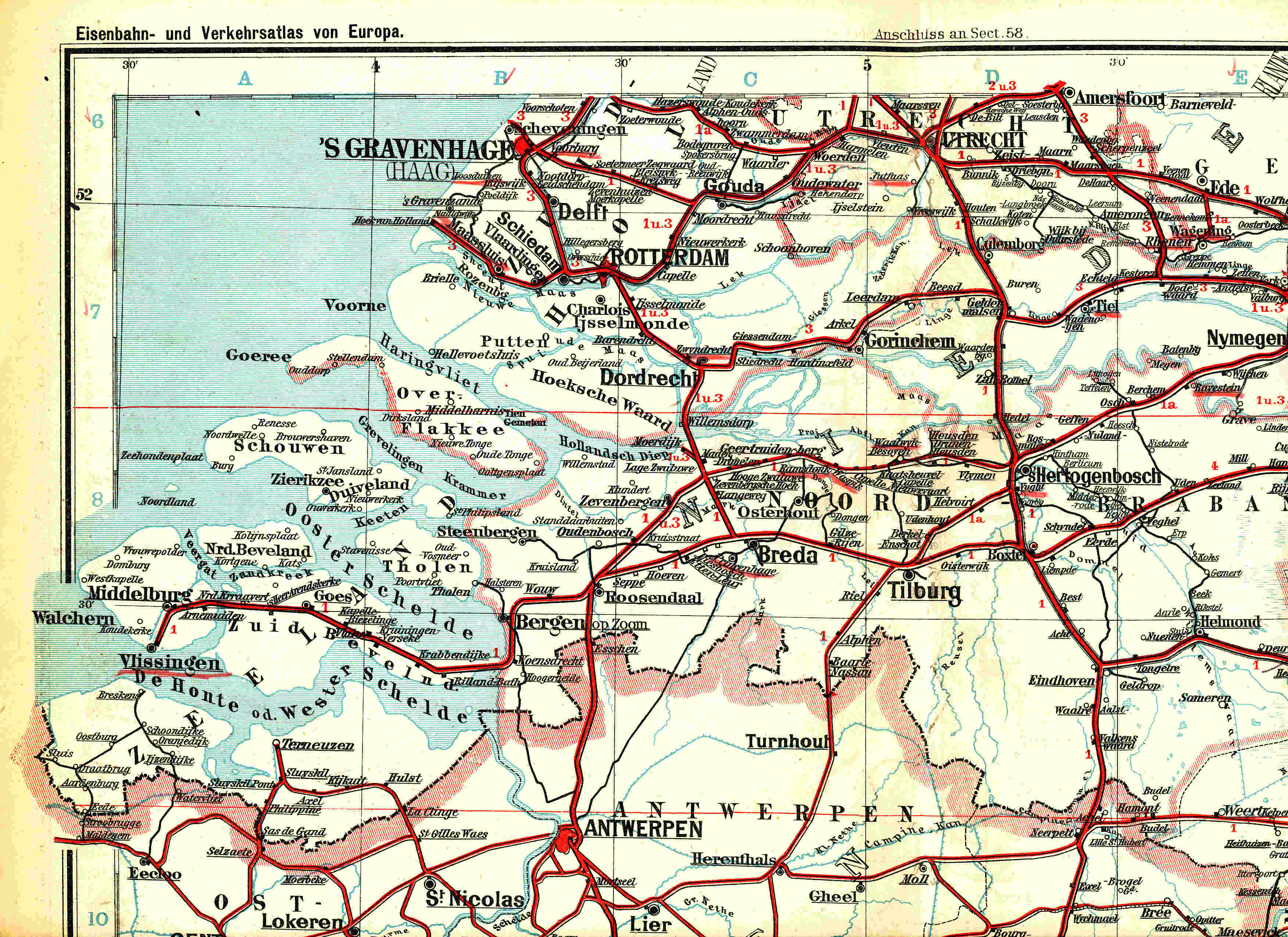
Railway map of 1897

In 1871 the Sloedam was constructed for the Roosendaal–Vlissingen railway. The dam connected the islands Walcheren and Zuid-Beveland, and cut off the Sloe, which was the southern approach to Middelburg over water. Therefore, and to profit from the expected benefits of the railway, the new Canal through Walcheren was dug.

On the north side of Middelburg, the Canal through Walcheren follows the bed of the Havenkanaal (New Harbor Canal) of 1817. In Middelburg the canal passed along the fortifications. Here it led to the demolishment of the Vlissingen Gate. In Vlissingen the canal was connected to extensive new harbour works.

The railroad entering Walcheren from the east does not cross this canal, but bends south and runs along it up to Vlissingen.

== Today ==
The canal is operational for shipping up to CEMT-class Va and recreational boating as well, the maximum speed is 20 kilometres per hour (12.4 miles per hour; 10.8 knots). All movable bridges (5) and sluices are remote controlled from a central point in Vlissingen, to be contacted by VHF.
North of the bridges in Middelburg is a branch to the harbour of Arnemuiden for CEMT-class II boats and after a mile on that canal an other branch to the harbour of Nieuw- en Sint Joosland for CEMT-class 0.
Excess waters (rain) from a part of Walcheren is discharged on the canal by a pumping station in Middelburg.
