= Zandkreekdam =

Hydraulic engineering structures in the Netherlands

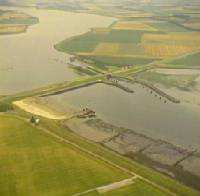
- The Zandkreekdam
- Coordinates: 51°32′36″N 3°51′55.2″E
- Carries: N256
- Owner: Rijkswaterstaat

Characteristics
- Total length: 0.83 kilometres (0.52 mi)

History
- Engineering design by: Deltadienst
- Construction start: 1957
- Construction end: 1960
- Opened: 1960

Location
- Interactive map of Zandkreekdam

The Zandkreekdam is a compartmentalisation dam located approximately 3 kilometres north of the city of Goes in The Netherlands. It connects Zuid-Beveland with Noord-Beveland, and separates the Oosterschelde from the Veerse Meer.

The Zandkreeksluis navigation lock in the dam permits shipping connections to Middelburg and Vlissingen, via the Veerse Meer and the Walcheren navigation channel. The Zandkreekdam is 830 metres in length, and was the first compartmentalisation dam to be constructed as part of the Delta Works, having been proposed by Johan van Veen as part of the Drie-Eilanden Plan (English: Three Islands Plan) which originated in the 1930s. It was the second project constructed under the Delta Works Plan, after the Stormvloedkering Hollandse IJssel which was completed in 1958.

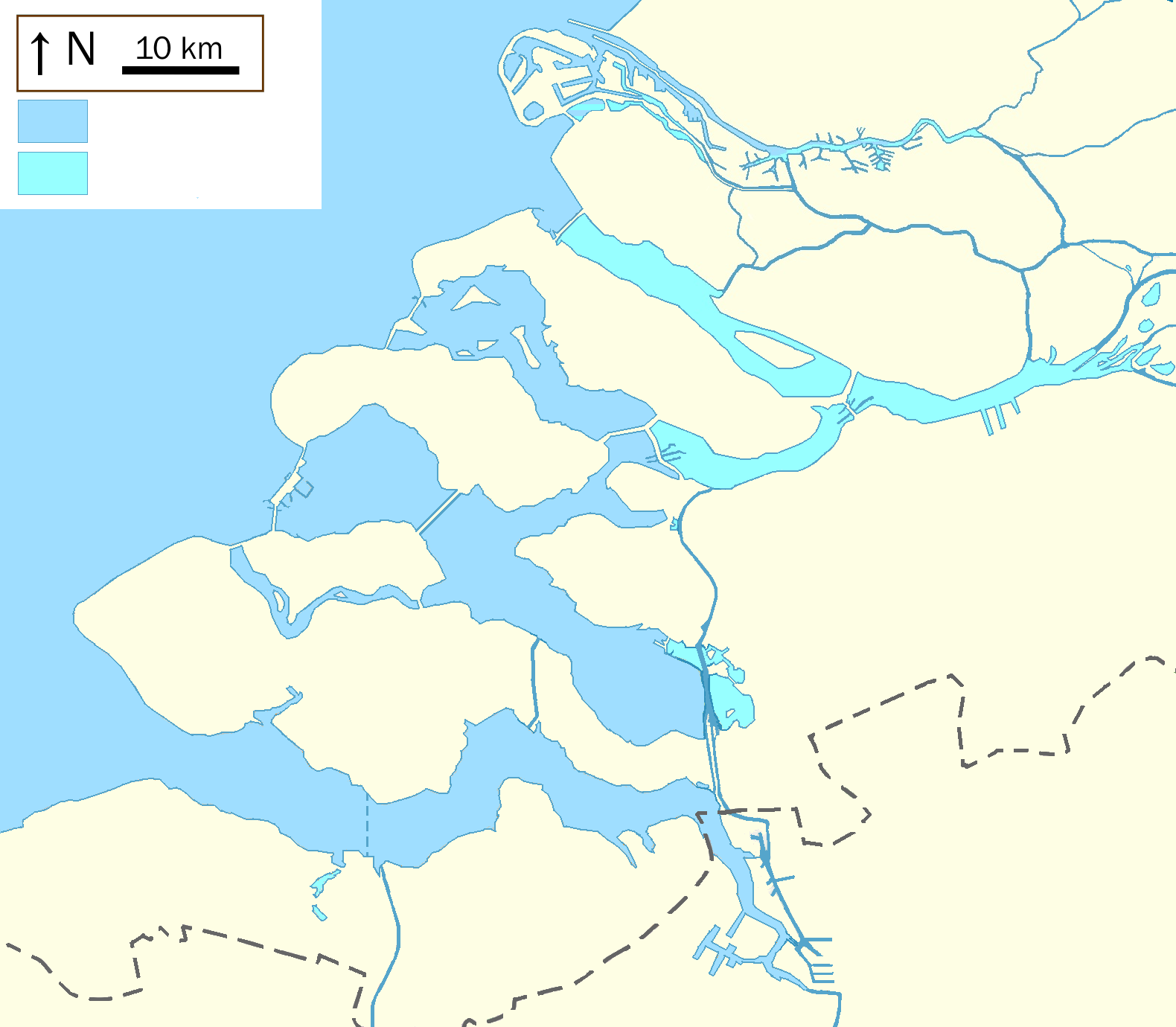
Delta Works

The construction of the Zandkreekdam, together with the Veerse Gatdam in 1961, created the freshwater Veerse Meer (Veerse Lake). Poor water quality in the lake led to the decision to build a control lock, known as the Katse Heule, which was completed in 2004 and re-established saltwater intrusion from the Oosterschelde into the Veerse Meer, and led to a significant improvement in water quality. There are two bridges at the Zandkreekdam locks to permit vehicular traffic to pass over it at any time.

Johan van Veen's Three-Island Plan required that construction of the Zandkreekdam and the Veerse Gatdam should be undertaken as early as possible in the Delta Works programme, to permit Dutch civil engineers and contractors to gain experience that would be necessary for more complicated Delta Works projects such as the Brouwersdam and Oosterscheldekering.

== Feasibility, planning and design ==
Johan van Veen had been developing his Three Islands Plan since the 1930s, in which he considered land reclamation around the islands of Walcheren, Nord-Beveland and Zuid-Beveland and proposed the closure of two bodies of water: the Veerse Gat and the Zandkreek. In combination with the effects of the previously-constructed Sloedam, this would shorten the coastline from 52 kilometers to 2.5 kilometres and open up large areas of land which could then be reclaimed from the sea.

Van Veen recognised the need to close both bodies of water, with the Zandkreekdam acting as a secondary dam to make the works on the Veerse Gatdam easier and therefore being constructed first. Having made extensive studies, van Veen realised that the closure of the Veerse Gat alone would cause unacceptable tidal streams in the Zandkreek.

The Delta Plan was of such unprecedented size and complexity that the plan was to start with the easiest parts and gain experience along the way. There were a total of four sea arms to be closed in the Delta region, of which the Veerse Gat – extending east into the Zandkreek – was the smallest.

By commencing with the smaller works, the engineers of the Delta Service could thus gain knowledge of construction methods, materials, and equipment – essential exercises for closing the larger Brouwershavense Gat and the Eastern Scheldt. The location pinpointed by van Veen for the Zandkreekdam is at a wantij, a Dutch term for the point at which the tidal currents from both sea arms meet at high tide, and the current is minimal.

It was also important that construction of the Veerse Gatdam did not lag too far behind the Zandkreekdam, as closing only the Zandkreek would dangerously increase the effects of storm surges in both the Veerse Gat and the Zandkreek.

The body set up to implement the Delta Works scheme, known as the Deltacommissie (English: Delta Commission), adopted the Three Islands Plan and the Zandkreekdam was taken forward. The design was based on the use of caissons 6 metres high, 7.5 metres wide and 11 metres long to form a closure dam, along with the construction of a lock to permit navigation.

== Construction ==
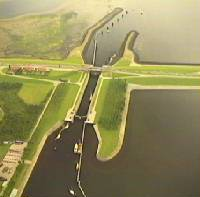
The Zandkreekdam and navigation lock

Construction began in the spring of 1957, with dredging undertaken to form a foundation trench 6.5 metres below Amsterdam Ordnance Datum (Normaal Amsterdams Peil, N.A.P.). Weak soils including soft clay and peat were removed and replaced with approximately 160,000 cubic metres of sand, and excavation depths up to 14 metres below N.A.P. were realised. Unit caissons were used to construct the dam, with the maximum depth of the closing hole being 5m below N.A.P.

On 3 May 1960, a pair of caissons were sunk into the final gap and the dam was then completed to a height of 8.25m above N.A.P.

The navigation lock, 140 metres long and 20 metres wide, was ready for shipping in the spring of 1960.

== See also ==
- Delta Works
- Flood control in the Netherlands
- Rijkswaterstaat
- Johan van Veen
