= Beveland =

Beveland may refer to:

- Noord-Beveland, Netherlands
- Zuid-Beveland, Netherlands
