= Arne (river) =

Former river in the Netherlands

Coordinates: 51°29′55″N 3°40′25″E

The Arne is a former river, possibly originally a tidal creek, on the former island of Walcheren in the Netherlands on which the city of Middelburg was founded. The Arne gave the city access to the Sloe, a confluent of the Westerschelde. Between 1266 and 1301, the Arne was dammed in Middelburg and later the river silted up. Therefore, in 1532 digging commenced on the ca. 3 km long Havenkanaal (Harbour Channel) (opened on the 24th of August 1535), causing Middelburg to again have a navigable connection to the Sloe and the Westerschelde.

Arnemuiden, which lays on the original estuary of the Arne, gets its name from this river.
