= N57 =

N57 may refer to:

== Roads ==
- N57 motorway (Netherlands)
- N57 road (Ireland), now the N26
- Nebraska Highway 57, in the United States

== Military ==
- N-57/OKB-16-57, an experimental Soviet autocannon
- Escadrille N57, a unit of the French Air Force
- HMS Severn (N57), a submarine of the Royal Navy

== Other uses ==
- N57 (Long Island bus)
- BMW N57, an automobile engine
- New Garden Airport, in Toughkenamon, Pennsylvania, United States
