= Geersdijk =

- Village
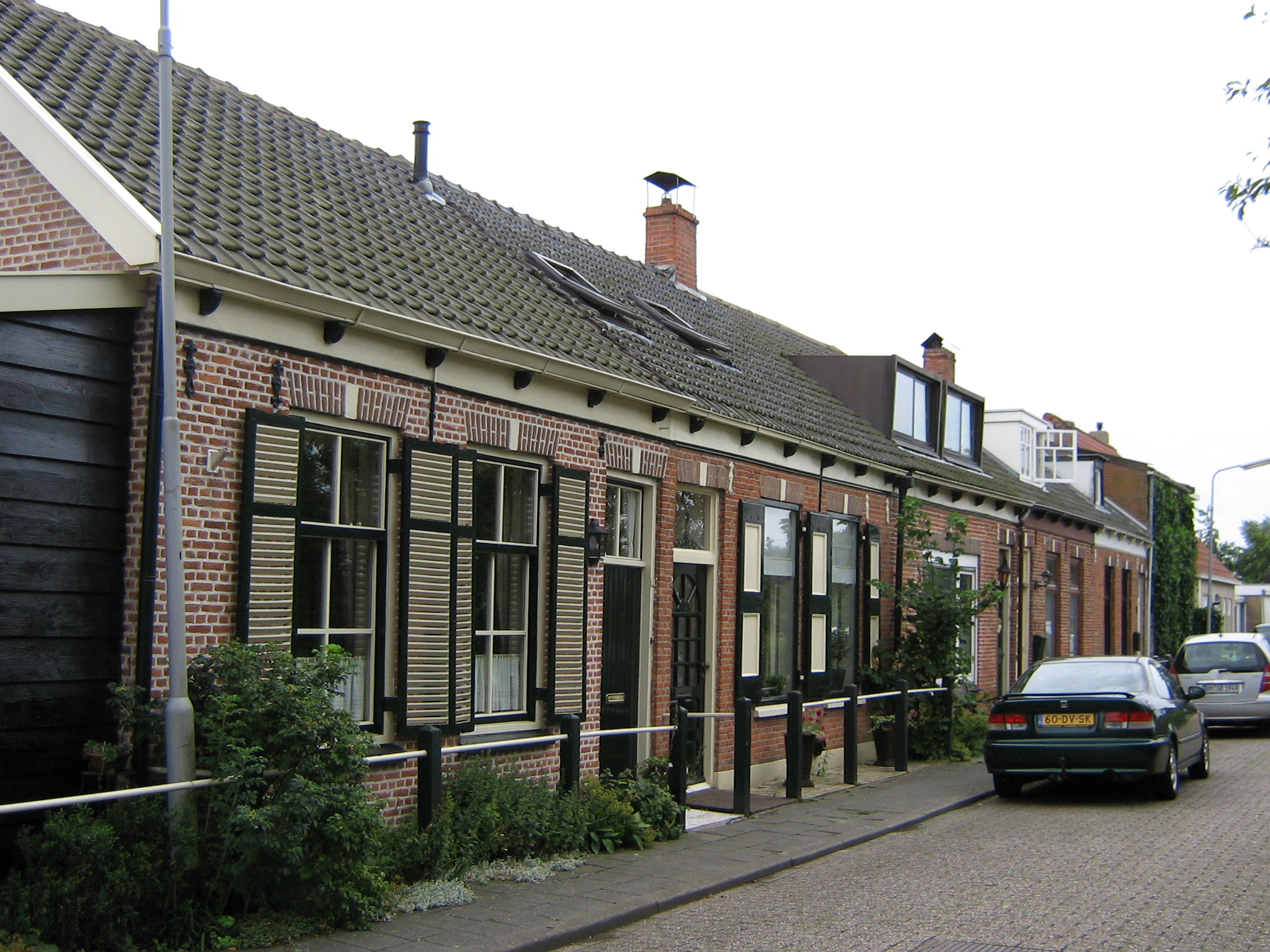

- Location in the province of Zeeland in the Netherlands Geersdijk (Netherlands)
- Coordinates: 51°34′N 3°46′E
- Country: Netherlands
- Province: Zeeland
- Municipality: Noord-Beveland
- Established: 1668

Area
  - Total: 4.24 km^{2} (1.64 sq mi)
- Elevation: 1.5 m (4.9 ft)

Population (2021)
  - Total: 360
  - Density: 85/km^{2} (220/sq mi)
- Time zone: UTC+1 (CET)
  - Summer (DST): UTC+2 (CEST)
- Postal code: 4494
- Dialing code: 0113

Geersdijk is a village in the Dutch province of Zeeland. It is a part of the municipality of Noord-Beveland, and lies about 13 km northeast of Middelburg.

The village was first mentioned in 1216 as Gerolsdike, and means "dike of Gerolf (person)". The original Geersdijk became an independent parish in 1216. The medieval village was lost in a flood in 1530 and disappeared completely in 1532. The current Geersdijk developed in 1668 after the Geersdijksepolder was enclosed by a dike.

Geersdijk lost its harbour in 1771 when the Willempolder was diked. In 1808, a new harbour with a canal to the Veerse Gat was constructed. Geersdijk was home to 201 people in 1840.

Geersdijk was flooded during the North Sea flood of 1953 and many houses were damaged beyond repair. The Drenthehuis was a gift of the province of Drenthe after the floods. It was completed in 1960 and is used a village house.
