= Veerse Gatdam =

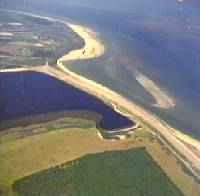
- Veerse Gatdam
- Coordinates: 51°35′16″N 3°38′8″E
- Carries: N57
- Owner: Rijkswaterstaat

Characteristics
- Total length: 2.8 kilometres (1.7 mi)

History
- Construction start: 1958
- Construction end: 27 April 1961
- Inaugurated: 27 October 1961

The Veerse Gatdam is a man-made barrier across the former Eastern Scheldt estuary branch known as the Veerse Gat, between Walcheren and Noord-Beveland islands in Zeeland, Netherlands. The barrier was completed on 27 April 1961. Because of the completion of this barrier and the completion of the Zandkreekdam a year prior on the eastern end of the waterway, the Veerse Meer was created. The Veerse Gatdam is the third structure constructed as part of the Delta Works water management system. The N57 motorway runs along the top of the barrier.

== Overview ==
The barrier is 2.8 km (1.7 mi) long and connects the island of Walcheren with Noord-Beveland. The barrier was partly built as a with asphalt coated dike on the Plaat van Onrust, a former sandbar. For the remaining parts, sinkable passing caissons were used. For the construction of these caissons, a dock was constructed between Veere en Vrouwenpolder. The caissons contain openings, so that the tide could keep going on, while building the barrier. With this it was prevented that the current would keep on getting stronger as the construction progressed. Only at the end of construction, were the sliders simultaneously lowered, by which the barrier was closed in one instant.

By building the Veerse Gatdam, the town of Veere was no longer connected with the open sea. The fishing fleet of Veere had to be relocated before the completion of the barrier to the nearby village of Colijnsplaat. The Veerse Meer is currently a popular aquatics location, particularly for windsurfing. On the north side of the dam, a large recreational beach has been created.

The closing of the Veerse Gat was adapted into a film, Deltafase 1, by Bert Haanstra.

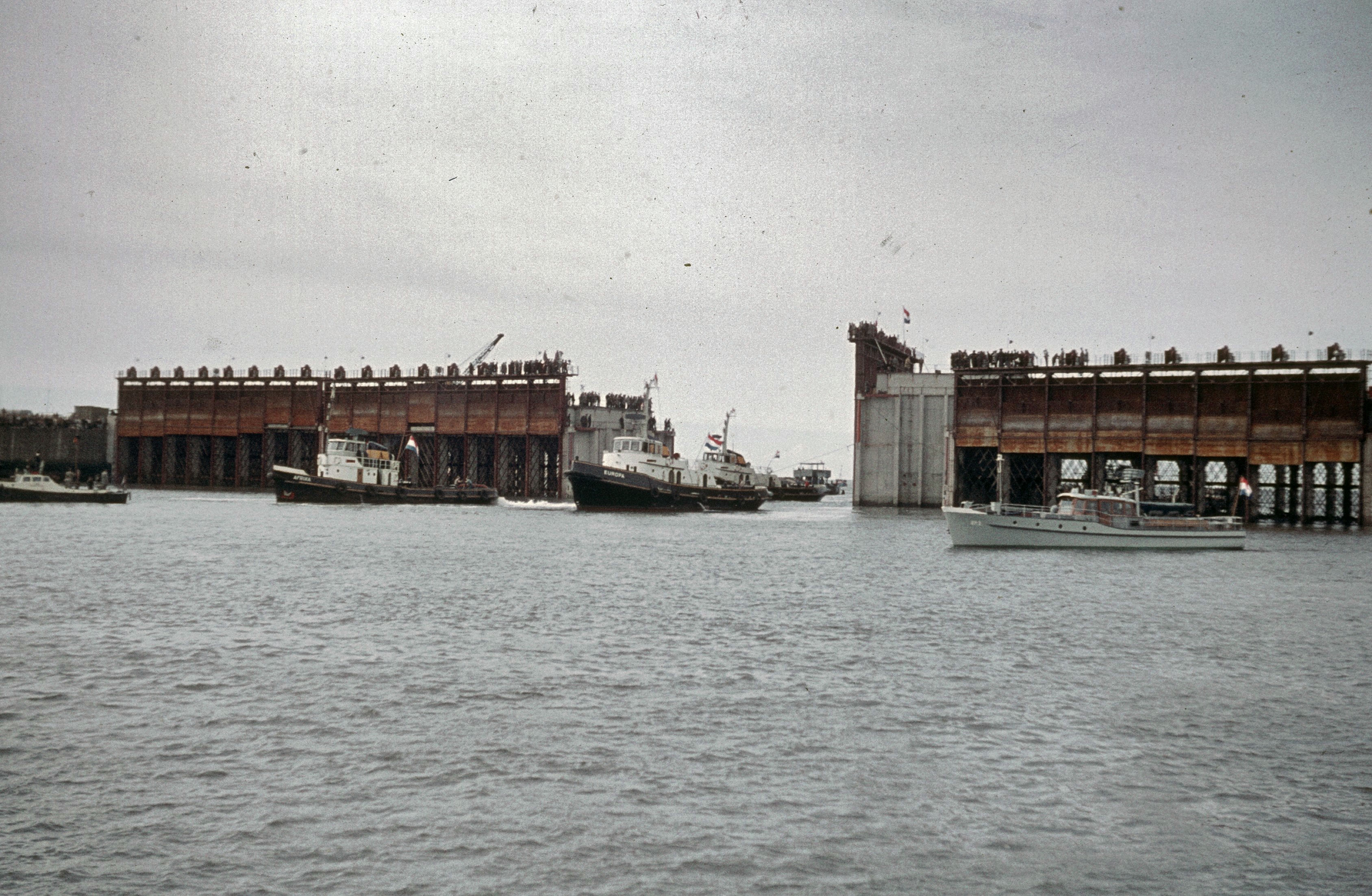
The last caisson is being sailed as the Veerse Gatdam is being closed, 1961.
