= Sloedam =

Dam in the Netherlands

Coordinates: 51°30′N 3°42′E

The Sloedam is a 1 km long dam, that was constructed in 1871, as a necessary part of the Roosendaal-Vlissingen Railway, the so-called Zeeuwse Lijn (Zealandic Line). Additionally this dam connected the island of Walcheren with Zuid-Beveland across the Sloe waterway, and therefore with the mainland of Brabant.

== The dam ==
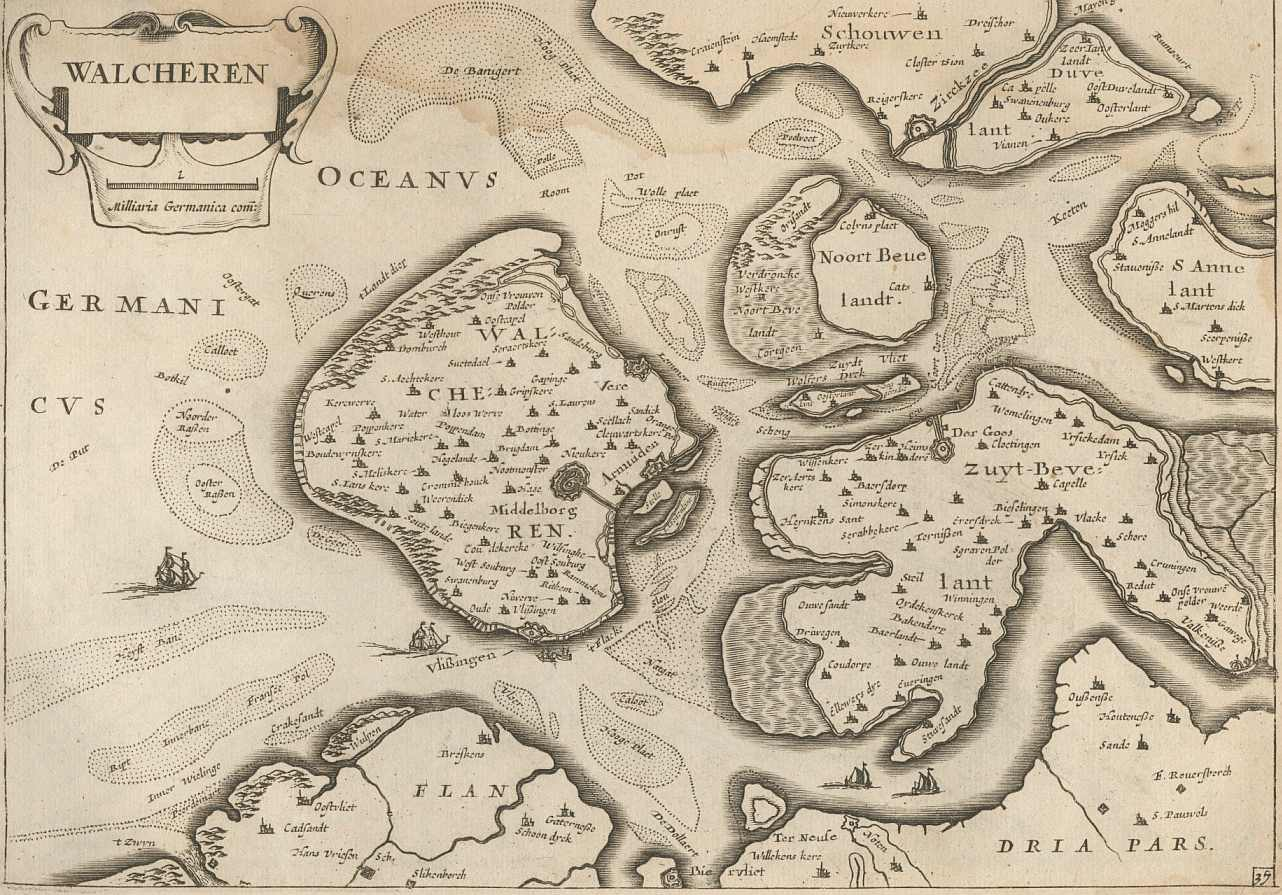
Central Zeeland in 1696. The Sloe is still a broad waterway separating Walcheren and Zuid-Beveland.

The Sloe was a waterway between the islands of Walcheren near the town of Arnemuiden, and Zuid-Beveland. In 1871 the construction of the dam started. Already on 14 June, the dam could be walked over during low tide. In December 1871 the construction was complete. On the first of March 1872 the railway track over the dam was opened for trains. Not long after, a newly constructed road for regular transport was opened.

After World War II, the silted up areas south of the dam were poldered with a second and a third Sloedam. When the Veerse Gat estuary was closed off by the Veerse Gatdam in 1961, the Sloedam lost it function as a primary defense against the sea.

== World War II ==
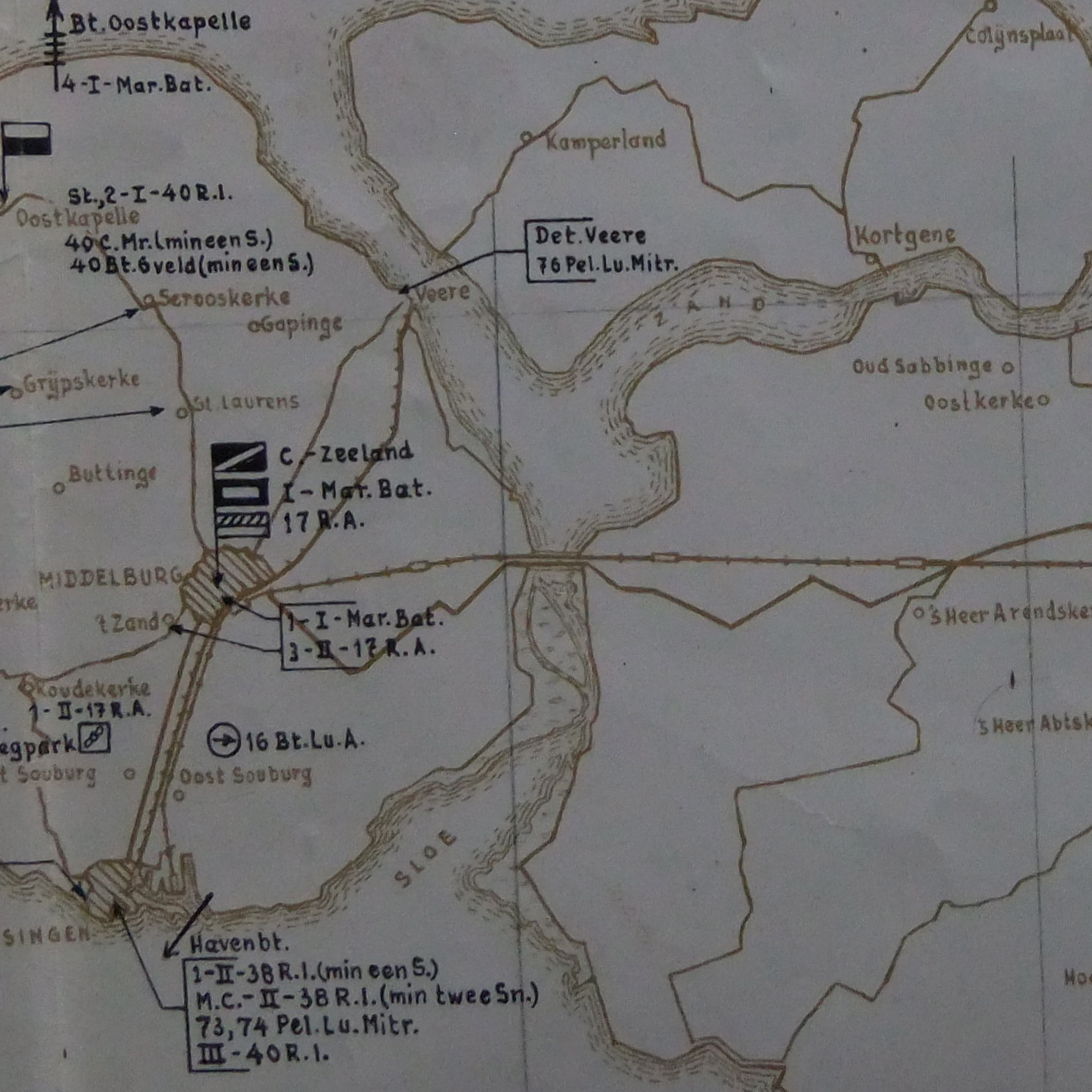
Cropped version of military map of Zeeland, 1940. The Sloedam is the only connection between Walcheren and Zuid-Beveland, the area south of the Sloedam is already silted up.

During World War II, two battles were fought on and around the Sloedam.

=== Battle of Zeeland ===
In May 1940, the area was contested during the German invasion of the Low Countries in the Battle of Zeeland. A combined French-Dutch force under brigadier-general Marcel Deslaurens attempted to stop the German invasion, but was unsuccessful. On 17 May a successful combat crossing of the Sloedam was made by SS Regiment Deutschland.

=== Battle of Walcheren Causeway ===
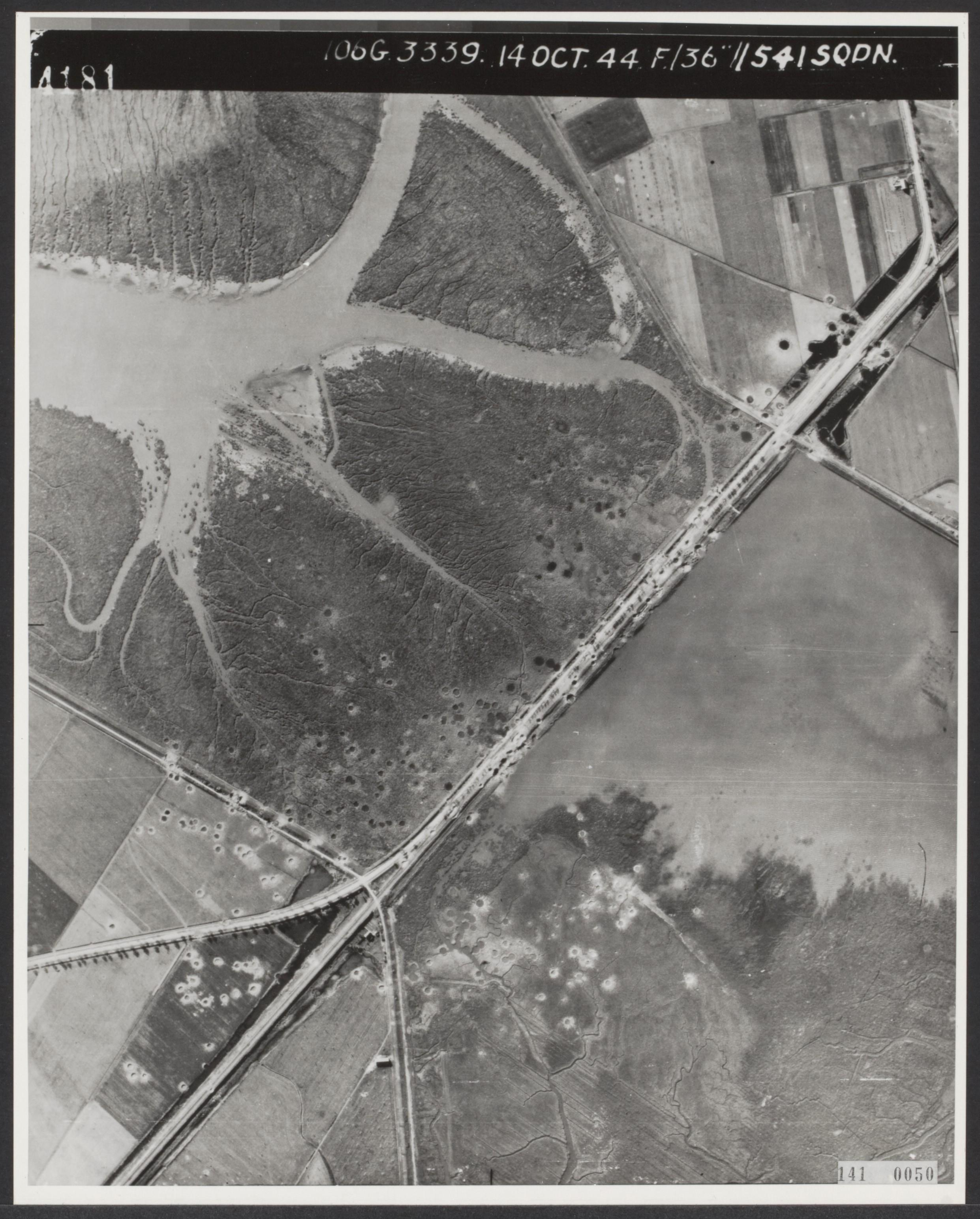
The Sloedam bombed, 1944

In 1944–1945, heavy fighting came to the area when the Allies attempted to clear the Western Scheldt, entrance to the harbor of Antwerp. After heavy fighting, Zeelandic Flanders (south of the Scheldt) and Zuid-Beveland (to the north) were freed from German control by Canadian forces. However, Walcheren island, north of the river mouth, still contained a large German force that controlled access to the Western Scheldt. De Sloedam was the only access road to the former island of Walcheren.

The Canadians reached the dam from Zuid-Beveland. The Germans were well prepared, and had established multiple well-prepared mortar sites that allowed them to fire on every point of the dam. The initial Canadian attempts to reach Walcheren failed. The Calgary Highlanders opened a bridgehead on Walcheren Island on the morning of 1 November 1944. The next day, soldiers of the 52nd (Lowland) Division crossed the Sloe to the south and attacked the German positions at the Sloedam from the rear. By this time the Canadians had withdrawn from the area. The attack on the Sloedam as intended as a diversion for Operation Infatuate, the capture of Walcheren by amphibious troops landing on the west and southern parts of the island.
