= Former island =

Mass of land that was once an island

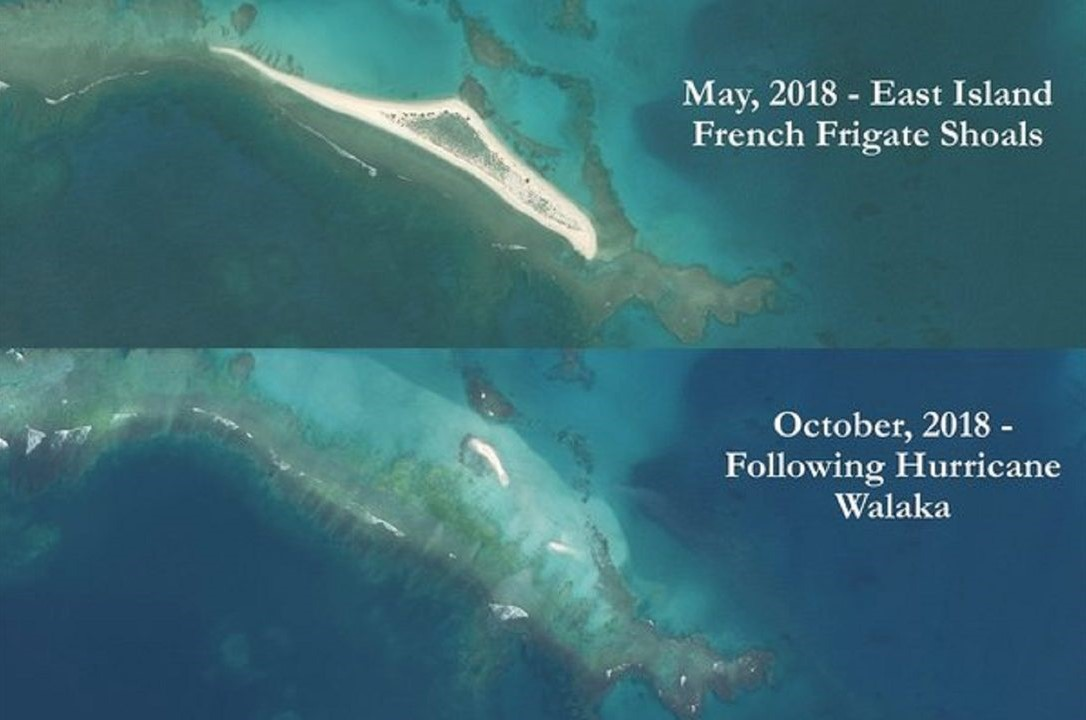
Infographic showing the effects of Hurricane Walaka of 2018 on the tiny Pacific island, East Island

A former island is a mass of land that was once an island, but has been joined to a mainland or another island, or engulfed by a body of water. The process of joining might be the result of volcanic activity, moving tidal sands, or through land reclamation. Islands engulfed by the sea may have submerged because of subsidence, tectonic activity, erosion, or rising sea levels. For example, the New Moor island in Bangladesh existed in the 1970s, but was engulfed by the Bay of Bengal in 2011.

== Examples ==
- Eldøyane, a partially artificial former island in Norway
- Harriet Island, a former island in the Mississippi River in Saint Paul, Minnesota, now joined to the mainland of Saint Paul
- Any of several former islands in the River Thames, England
- Mount Muria, previously limited by the Muria Strait which has become shallow, now part of Java
- Peñón de Vélez de la Gomera, a Spanish former island now joined to the Moroccan shore by a sandy isthmus
- Sakurajima, a former island now joined to the mainland in Japan
- Sevan Island, a former island in Armenia, now a peninsula
- Urk and Schokland, two former islands now part of the reclaimed Noordoostpolder in the Netherlands, a polder reclaimed as part of the Zuiderzee Works designed by Cornelis Lely
- Walcheren, a former island in the Netherlands now joined with Zuid-Beveland as part of the Delta Works to prevent flooding
- Zealandia, an former island and ancient continent off the coast of Australia now submerged into present day New Zealand and Vanuatu

== See also ==
- Ghost Island (disambiguation)
- List of lost lands
- Phantom island
- Tied island
