= Kamperland =

- Village
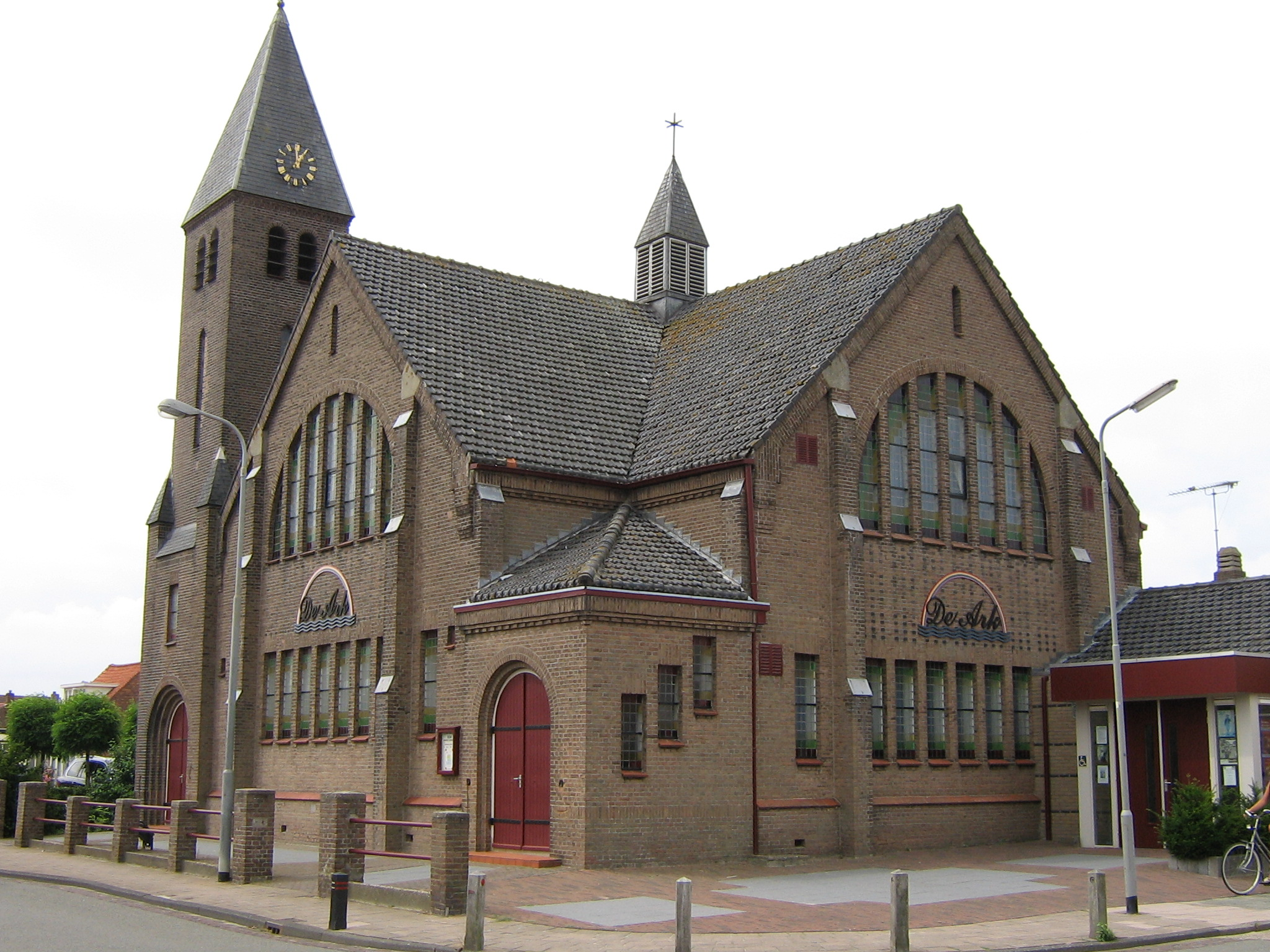
- Church of Kamperland

- Location in the province of Zeeland in the Netherlands Kamperland (Netherlands)
- Coordinates: 51°34′14″N 3°42′9″E
- Country: Netherlands
- Province: Zeeland
- Municipality: Noord-Beveland

Area
  - Total: 30.54 km^{2} (11.79 sq mi)
- Elevation: 1.0 m (3.3 ft)

Population (2021)
  - Total: 2,100
  - Density: 69/km^{2} (180/sq mi)
- Time zone: UTC+1 (CET)
  - Summer (DST): UTC+2 (CEST)
- Postal code: 4493
- Dialing code: 0113

Kamperland is a village in the Dutch province of Zeeland. It is a part of the municipality of Noord-Beveland, and lies about 11 km northeast of Middelburg.

== History ==
The village was first mentioned in 976 as Campan, and means "land of Kampen", a former village which used to be located in the area, and was lost in the flood of 1530. Kamperland is a road village which developed in the second half of the 18th century after the Heer Janszpolder was diked in 1699.

Kamperland was home to 170 people in 1840. The Dutch Reformed church is an aisleless church which was built in 1901. A little open tower and consistory were added in 1911. The church was decommissioned in 1997, and is used as brasserie since 1998.

From the 1970s onwards, a recreational zone developed near the harbour and along the Veerse Meer. Kamperland used to be part of the municipality of Wissenkerke. In 1995, it was merged into Noord-Beveland.

== Gallery ==
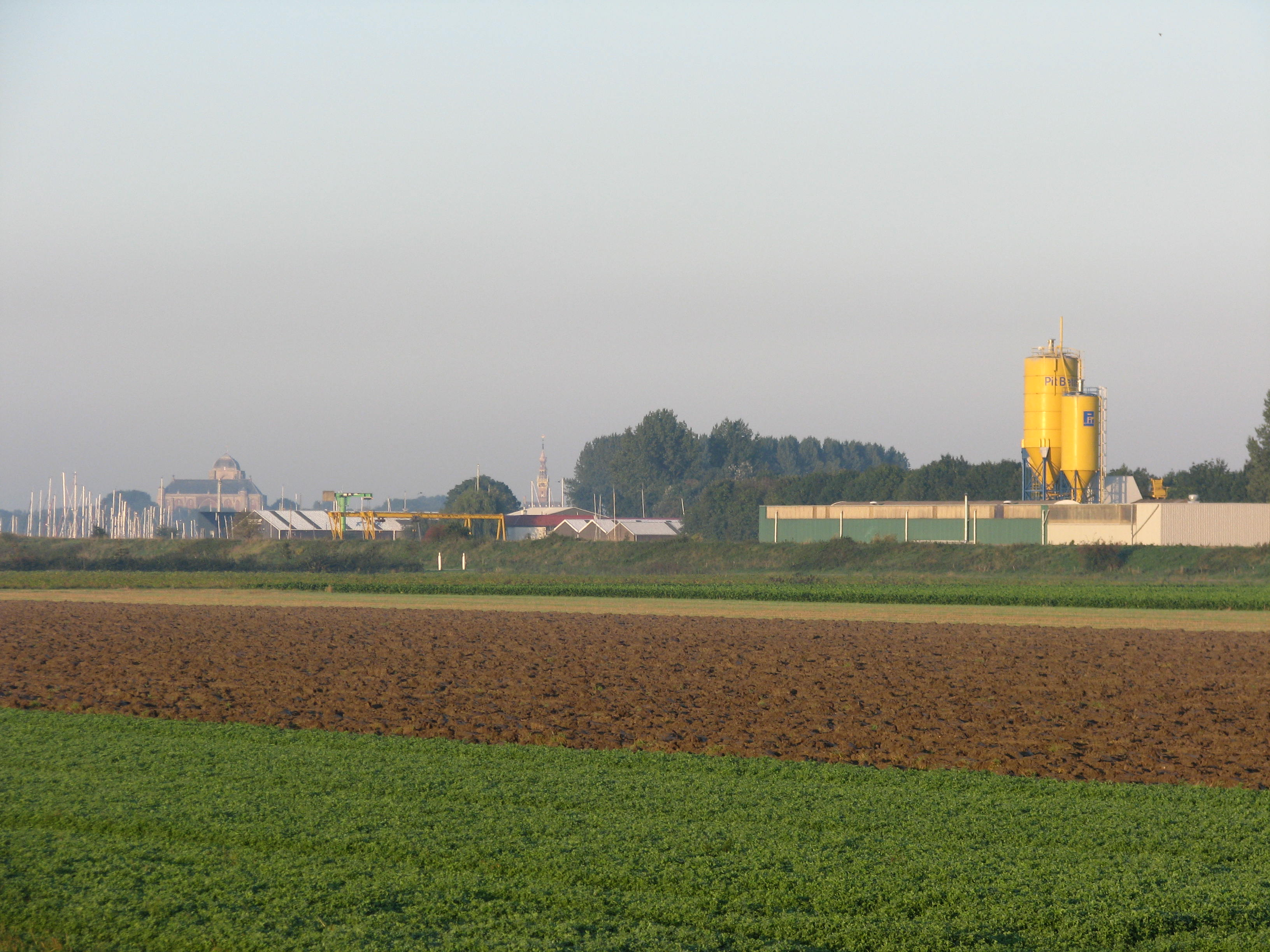
View on Kamperland

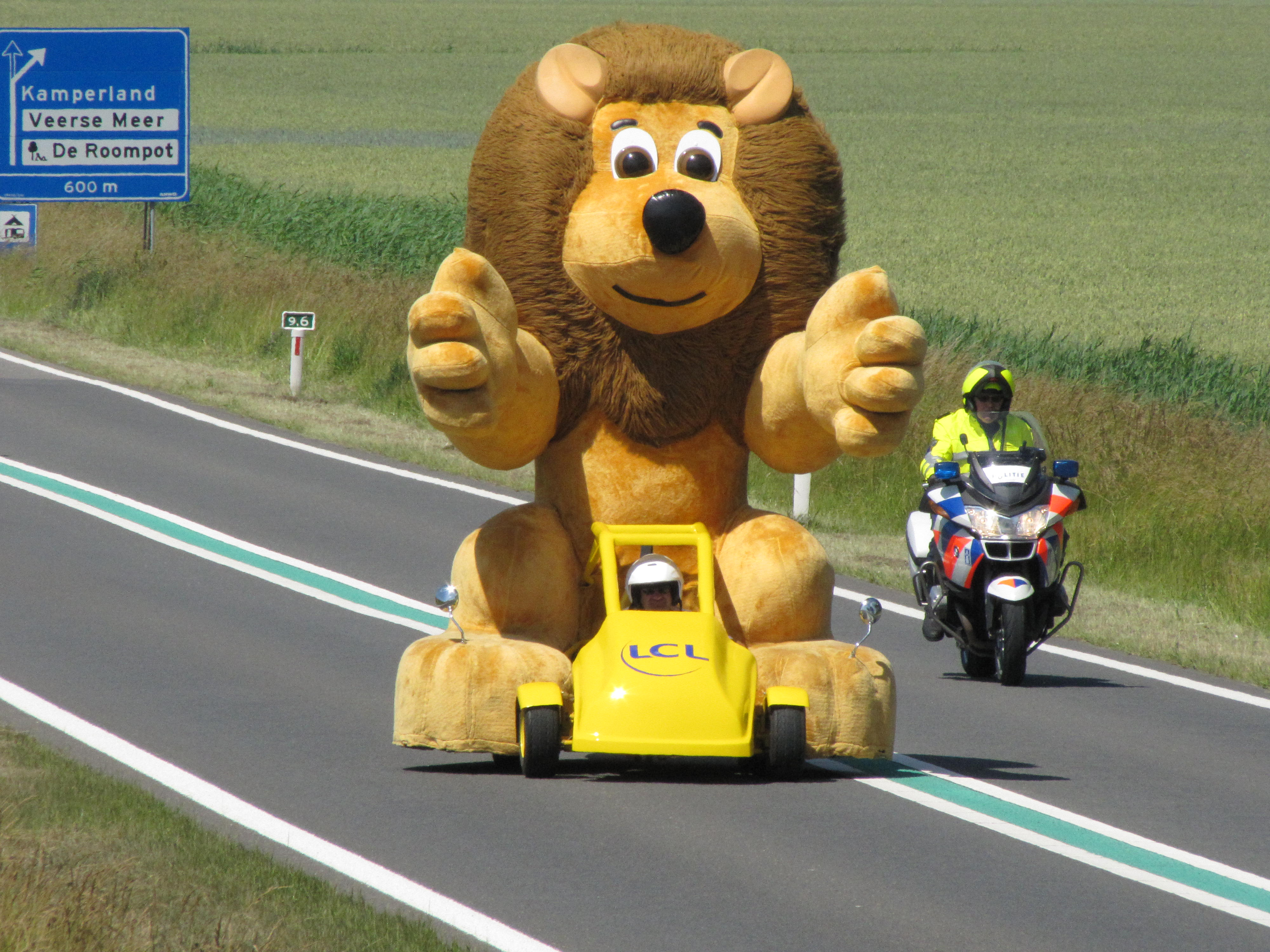
Tour de France in Kamperland (2010)

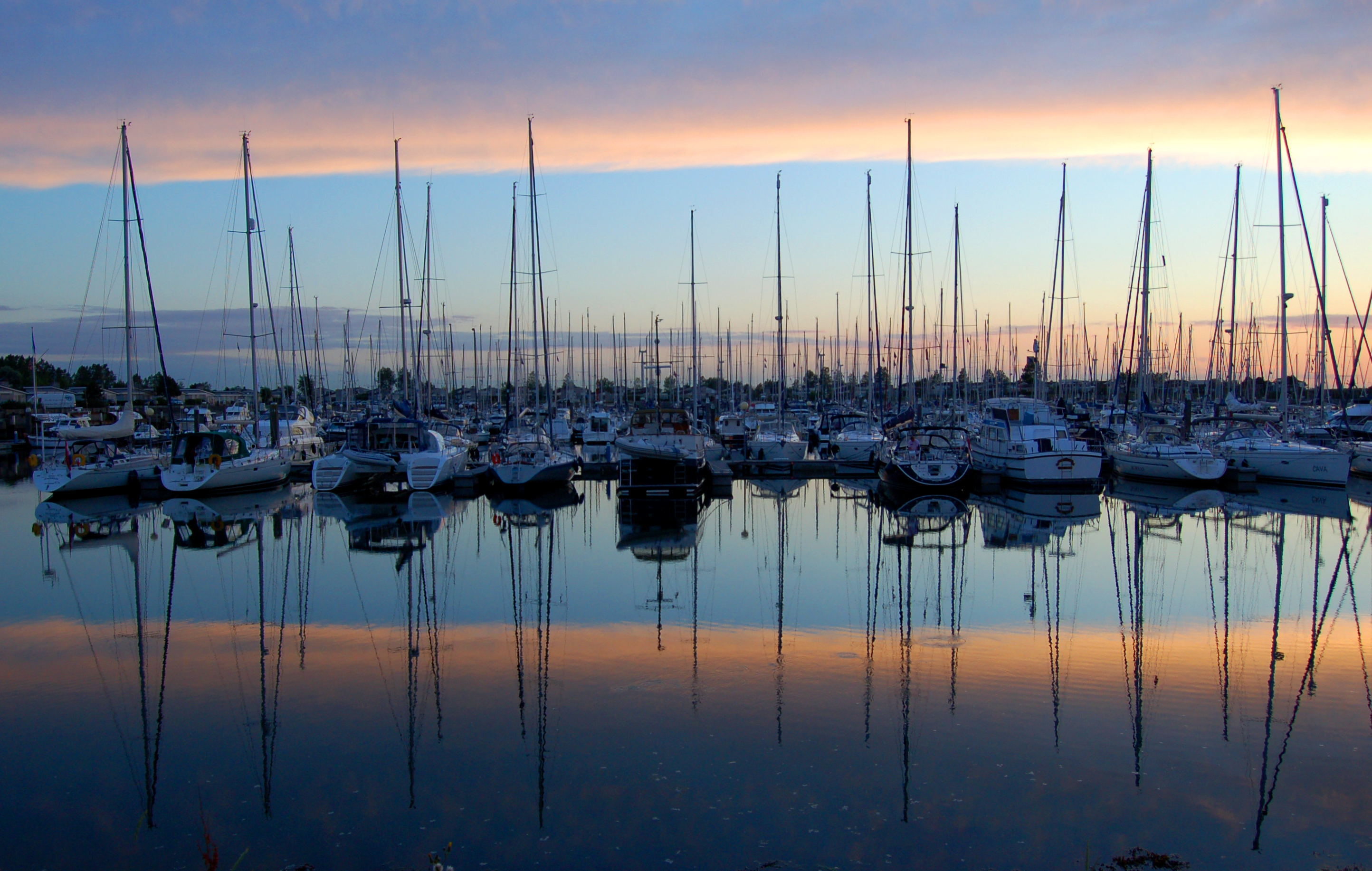
Marina of Kamperland

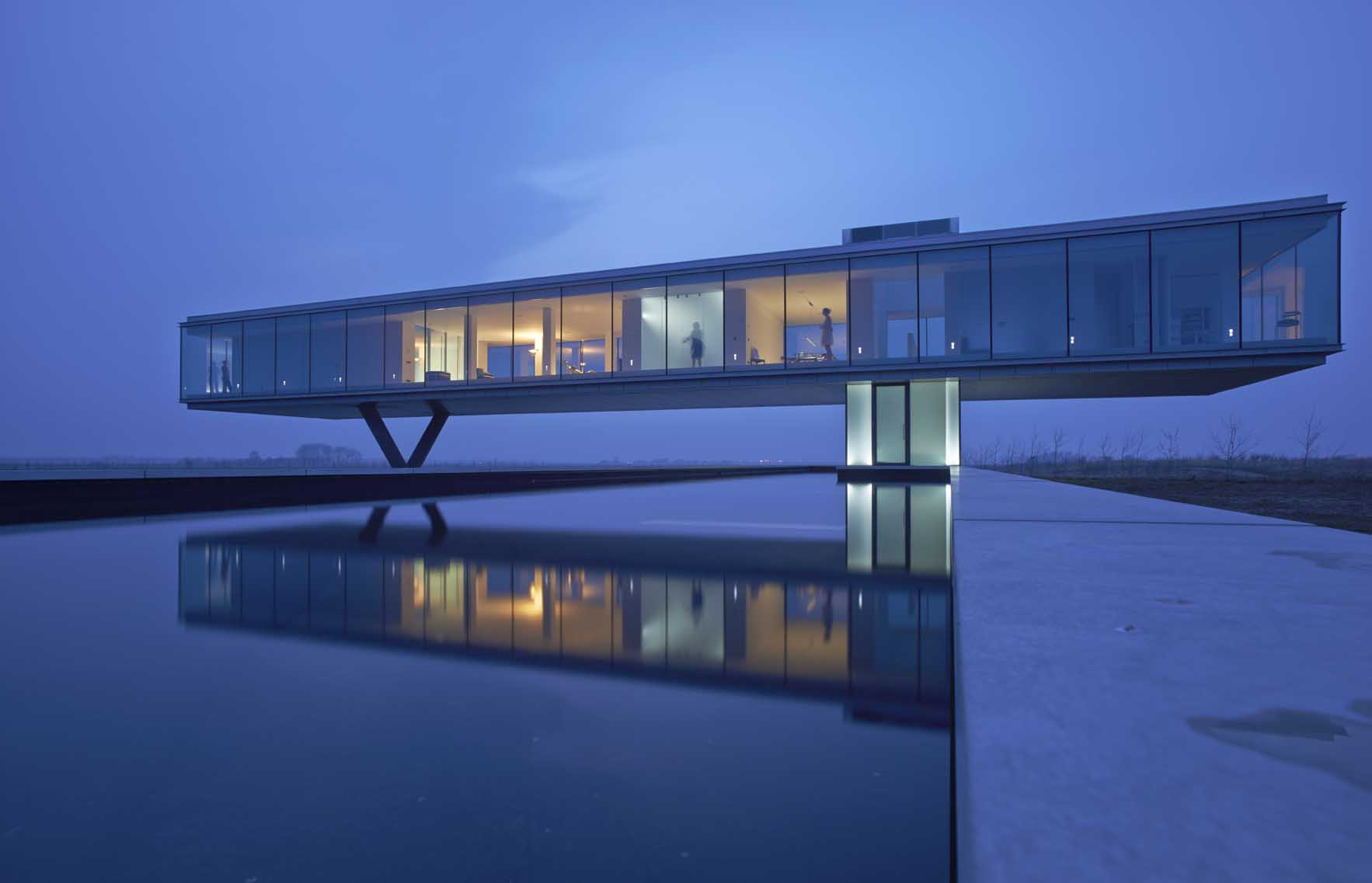
Villa Kogelhof
