= Veerse Meer =

Lagoon in the southwest Netherlands

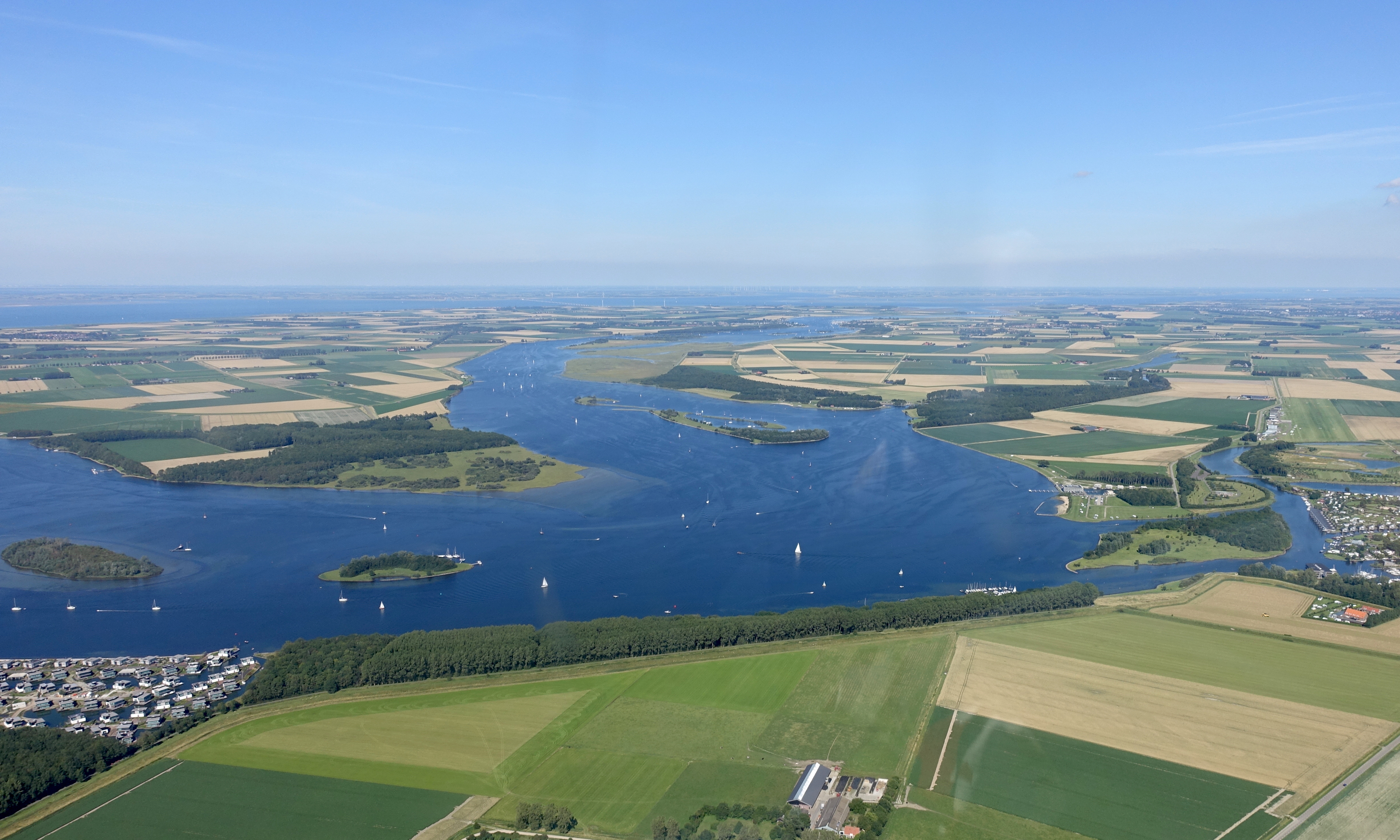

- Location within Zeeland
- Location: Zeeland
- Coordinates: 51°31′N 3°43′E
- Type: artificial lagoon, brackish
- Basin countries: Netherlands
- Max. length: 22 km (14 mi)
- Max. width: 1,500 m (4,900 ft)
- Islands: 13
- Settlements: Veere

Ramsar Wetland
- Designated: 29 August 2000
- Reference no.: 1251

The Veerse Meer (Lake Veere) is a lagoon in the southwest Netherlands in the province of Zeeland.

== Description ==
It is 22 km long, and 1,500 m wide in places. Lying between the old islands of Noord-Beveland, Zuid-Beveland and Walcheren, it is linked to the river Scheldt by the Zandkreekdam sluice, which allows this lagoon to have brackish water, slightly less salty than sea water. There are 13 small uninhabited islands in the lake. Some of its banks, underwater at high tide, have been made into nature reserves, while others are popular for water sports, such as sailing.

The Veerse Meer was created as a flood control measure to end storm surges through the Veerse Gat. The creation of the lake also allowed the function to regulate water levels in the surrounding polders by acting as a drainage basin until the excess waters could be discharged into the Eastern Scheldt and also allowed for recreation: Its level are lowered in the winter to help drain the polders and maintained at a higher level for recreational activities in the summer.

== History ==
Originally an outlet of the Scheldt called the Veerse Gat to the west which met with the Zandkreek to the east, it was first closed off from the Scheldt by the Zandkreekdam in 1960, and from the North Sea in 1961 by Veerse Gatdam, some of the first constructions of the Delta Works water management system.

== Water quality issues ==
In 2004, the Katse Heule sluice was constructed in the Zanderkreekdam to allow saltwater to flow in from the Eastern Scheldt to improve water quality and partially return it to its original brackish state. While water quality measurements initially improved, subsequent monitoring of the lake showed a reversal in these quality measurements. Agricultural runoff discharged into the lake from the surrounding polders has increased nitrogen and phosphorus level and decreased its dissolved oxygen leading to harmful algal blooms, thereby decreasing the diversity of the flora and fauna in and around the lake. To improve water quality, early concepts include widening of the Katse Heule to allow for further water exchange between the lake and the Eastern Scheldt.

== Gallery ==
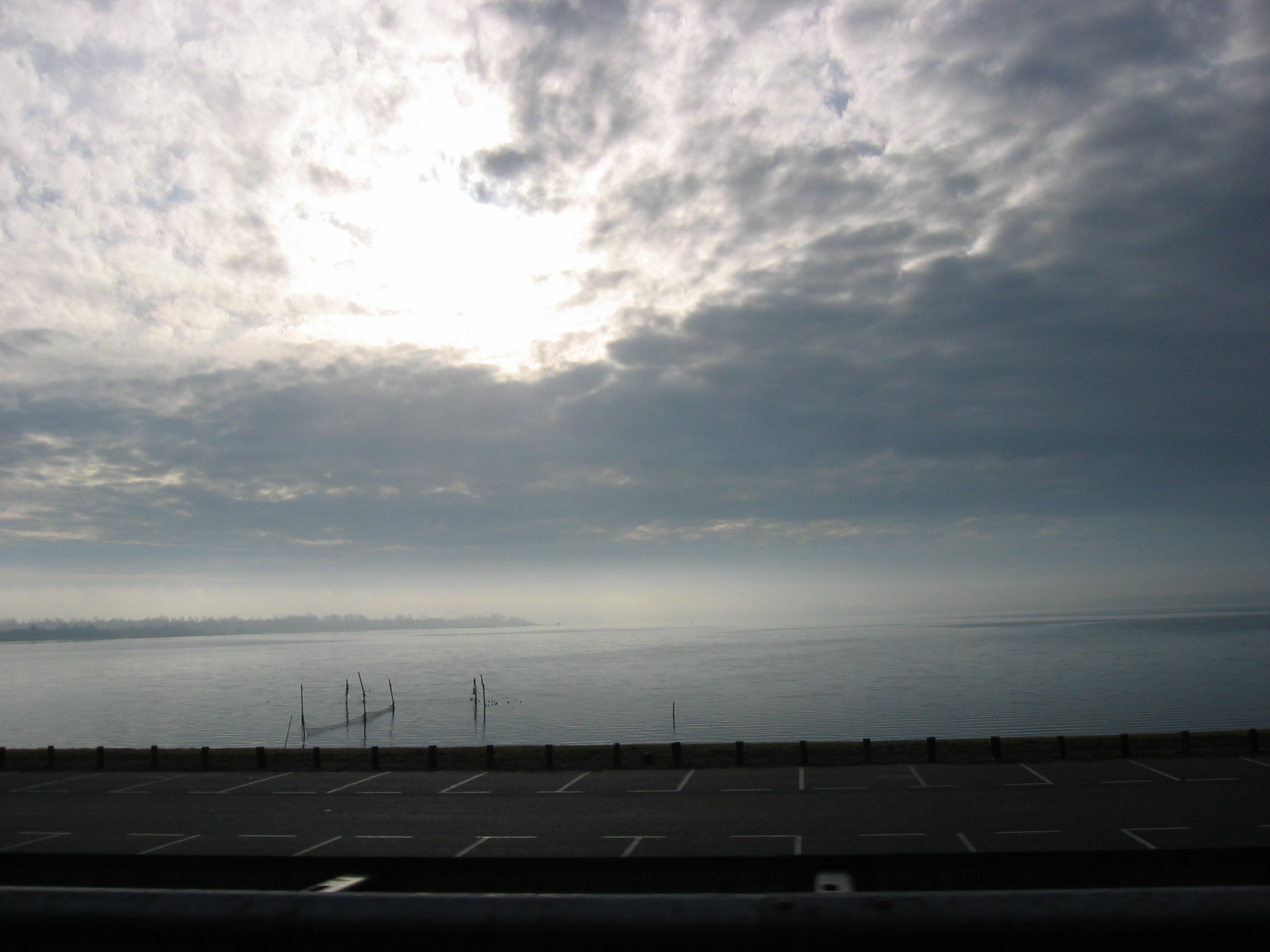
A view of Veerse Meer

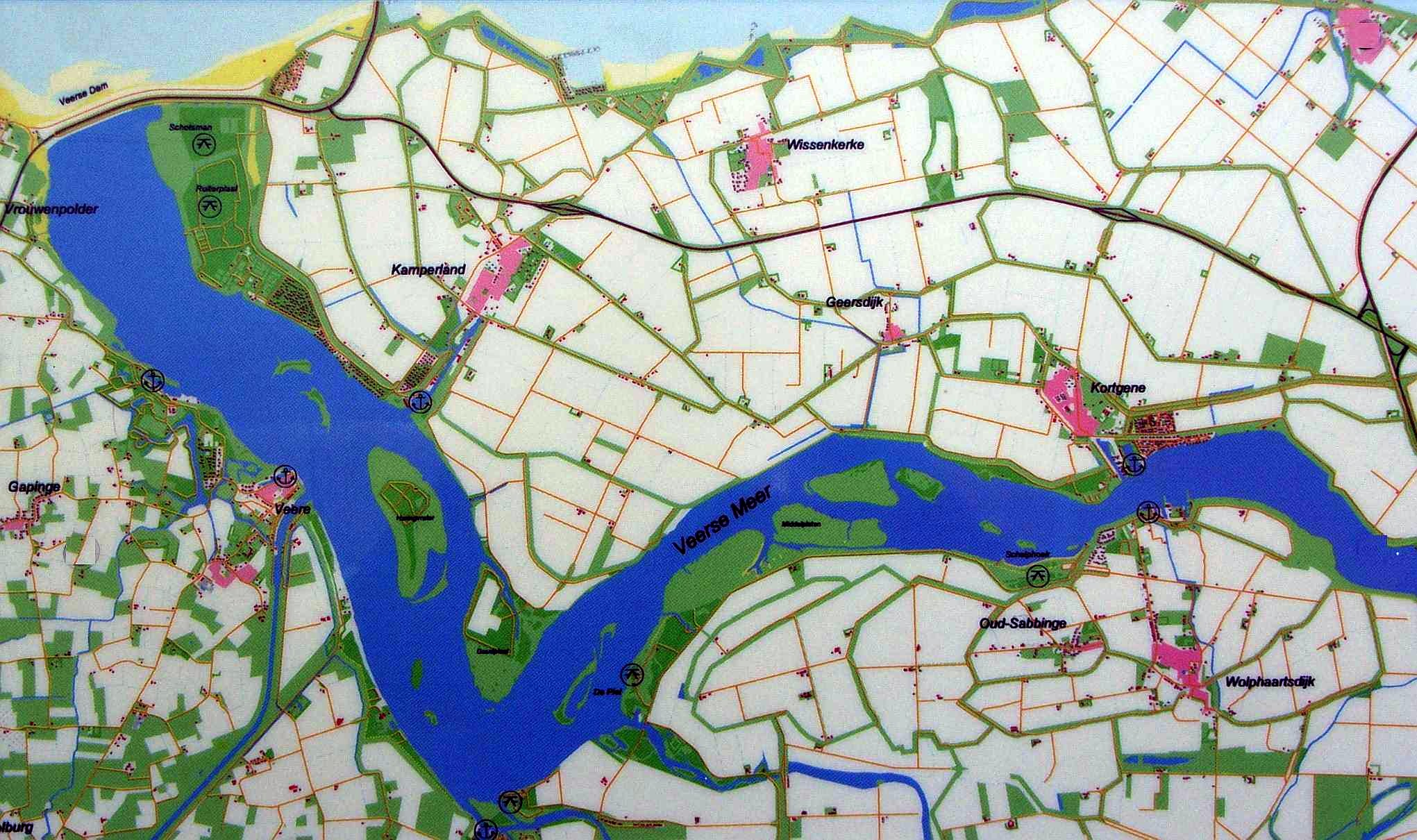
A map of Veerse Meer
