= Ghost Island (disambiguation) =

Ghost Island may refer to:

- Wheeler Island, Connecticut (part of the Thimble Islands)
- Hashima Island in Japan
- Pulau Hantu in Singapore
- Traffic island, a painted road marking called a ghost island in the UK.
- Survivor: Ghost Island, the 36th season of the U.S. version of the reality series Survivor

== See also ==
- Lost lands
- Vanishing island
- Fata Morgana (mirage)
- The Ghost Islands
- Mirage
- Phantom island
