= Veerse Gat =

Sea channel in the Netherlands

Coordinates: 51°32′49″N 3°40′30″E

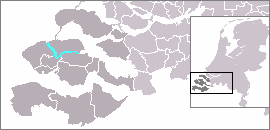
The location of Veerse Meer (previously Veerse Gat).

The Veerse Gat or Veeregat was the sea channel between Walcheren and Noord-Beveland islands in Zeeland in the Netherlands. In 1961 as part of the Delta Plan it was blocked off by the Veerse Gatdam and made into an inland lake called Veerse Meer.
