= N57 motorway (Netherlands) =

Highway in the Netherlands

Provincial highway 57
- Provinciale weg 57
- Motorways in the Netherlands with N57 bold

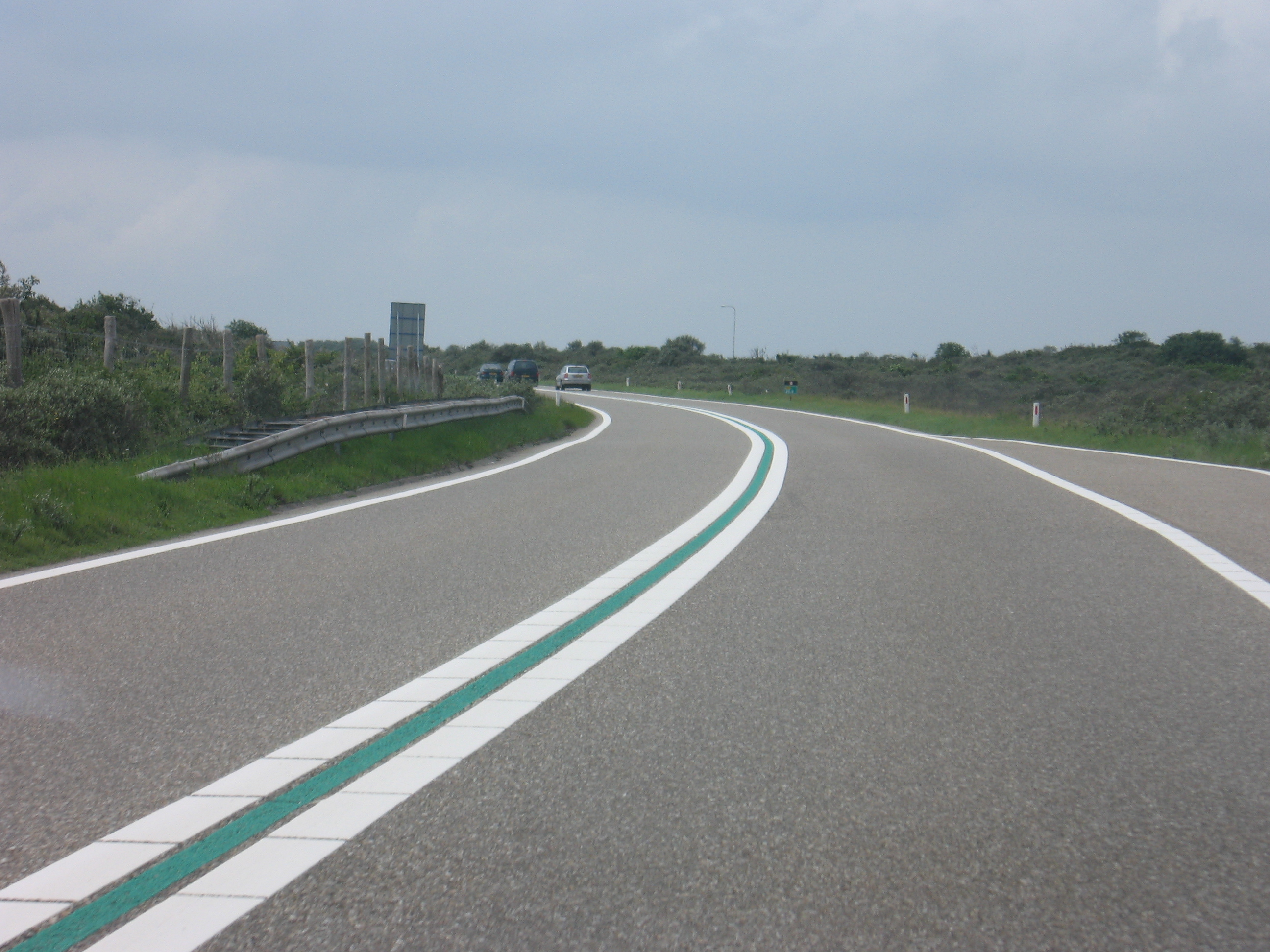
- The N57 with green midline

Route information
- Maintained by Rijkswaterstaat
- Length: 77 km (48 mi)

Major junctions
- North end: A 15 near Rotterdam
- N 218 near Brielle; N 495 in Hellevoetsluis; N 496 near Rockanje; N 497 near Hellevoetsluis; N 215 in Stellendam; N 652 near Ellemeet; N 651 near Noordwelle; N 59 in Serooskerke; N 652 in Haamstede; N 255 near Kamperland; N 663 in Vrouwenpolder; N 287 near Serooskerke

- South end: E312 / A 58 near Middelburg

Location
- Country: Kingdom of the Netherlands
- Constituent country: Netherlands
- Provinces: South Holland, Zeeland

Highway system
- Roads in the Netherlands; Motorways; E-roads; Provincial; City routes
← A 50	→ A 58

N57, or rijksweg 57, is a 77 km long national road in the provinces of South Holland and Zeeland in the Netherlands. It is also known as the dammenroute (Route of dams).

The N57 connects the city and the port of Rotterdam with Middelburg and other coastal towns in Zeeland and southern South Holland.

== Trivia ==
The second stage of the 2015 Tour de France took place on a large part of the N57, with the finish at Neeltje Jans.
