= Noord-Beveland =

Noord-Beveland North Beveland
- Municipality
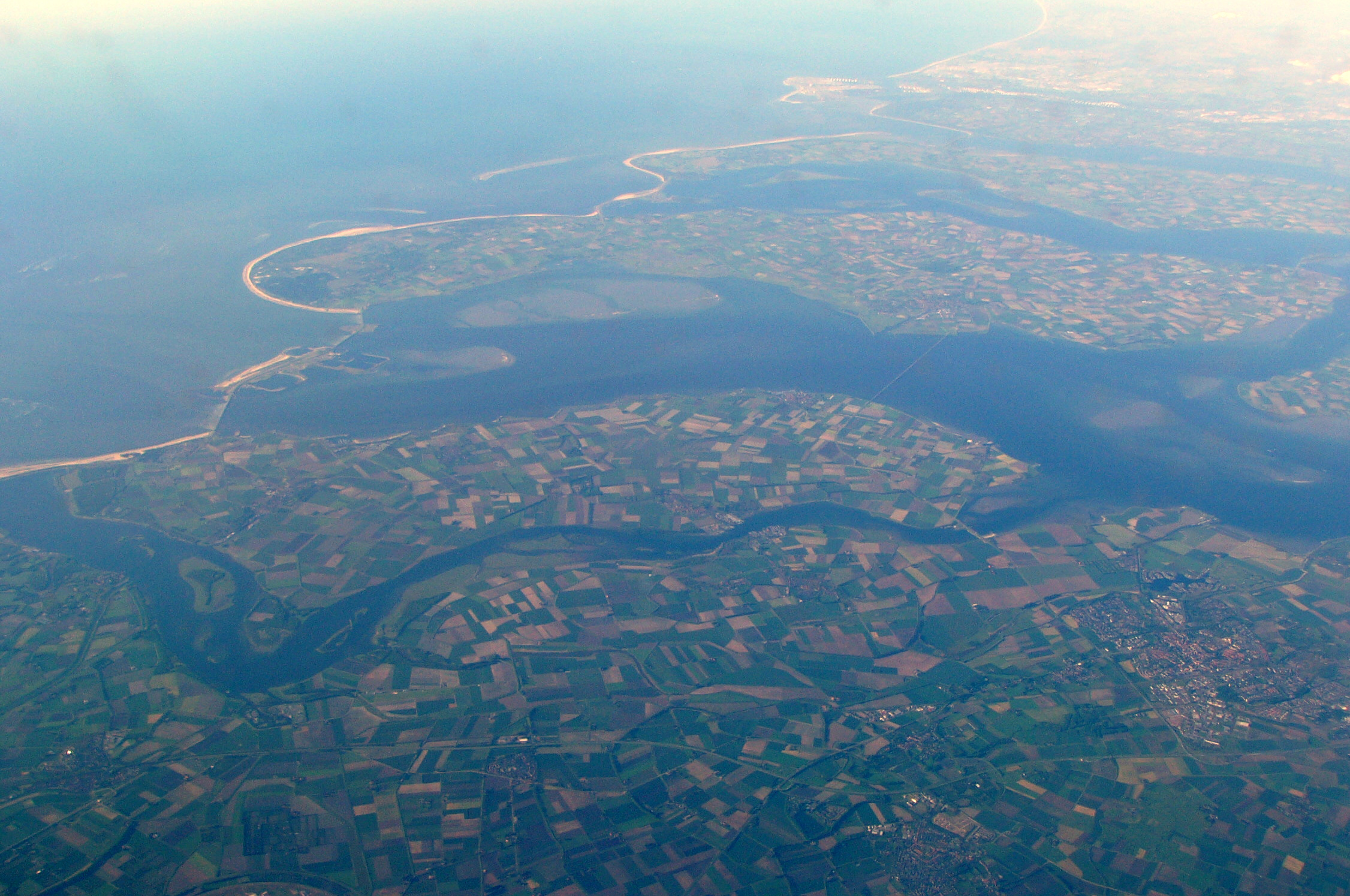
- Aerial view of Noord-Beveland

- Flag Coat of arms

- Location in Zeeland
- Coordinates: 51°35′N 3°45′E
- Country: Netherlands
- Province: Zeeland
- Established: 1 January 1995

Government
  - Body: Municipal council
  - Mayor: Marcel Delhez (VVD)

Area
  - Total: 121.58 km^{2} (46.94 sq mi)
  - Land: 85.96 km^{2} (33.19 sq mi)
  - Water: 35.62 km^{2} (13.75 sq mi)
- Elevation: 1 m (3.3 ft)

Population (January 2021)
  - Total: 7,581
  - Density: 88/km^{2} (230/sq mi)
- Demonym: Noord-Bevelander
- Time zone: UTC+1 (CET)
  - Summer (DST): UTC+2 (CEST)
- Postcode: 4484–4499
- Area code: 0113
- Website: www.noord-beveland.nl

Noord-Beveland (Dutch pronunciation: [ˈnoːrd ˌbeːvəlɑnt]; "North Beveland") is a municipality and region in the southwestern Netherlands and a former island, now part of the Walcheren-Zuid-Beveland-Noord-Beveland peninsula. Noord-Beveland is enclosed by the Oosterschelde estuary to the north, and the former straits, now combined lake, of Veerse Meer and Zandkreek to the south. As part of the Delta Works, dams have connected Noord-Beveland to Walcheren and Zuid-Beveland.

== Population centers ==
- Colijnsplaat
- Geersdijk
- Kamperland
- Kats
- Kortgene
- Wissenkerke

There is no village called Noord-Beveland itself.

=== Topography ===
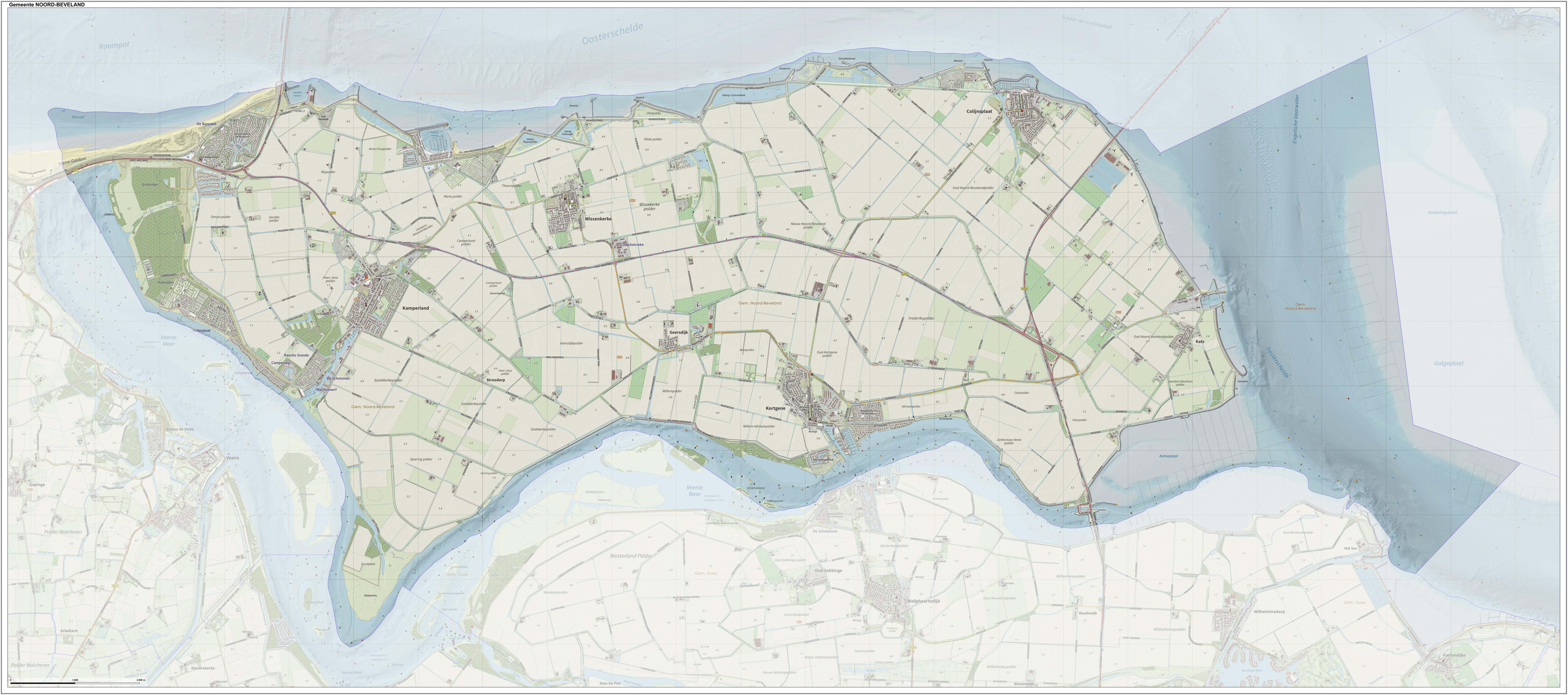

Dutch Topographic map of the municipality of Noord-Beveland, June 2015

== Ganuenta ==
In Roman times, the town of Ganuenta lay north of where the village of Colijnsplaat is now, a location now covered by the water of the Oosterschelde. It was an important centre for trade. Nearby, there was a temple dedicated to the ancient regional sea goddess Nehalennia. A replica of this temple was officially opened in Colijnsplaat in August 2005.

== Notable people ==
- Johannis de Rijke (1842 in Colijnsplaat – 1913) a Dutch civil engineer and a foreign advisor to the Japanese government
- Eduard Flipse (1896 in Wissenkerke – 1973) a Dutch conductor and composer
- Neeltje Karelse (1926 in Kortgene – 2015) a Dutch track-and-field athlete, competed at 1948 Summer Olympics

== Gallery ==
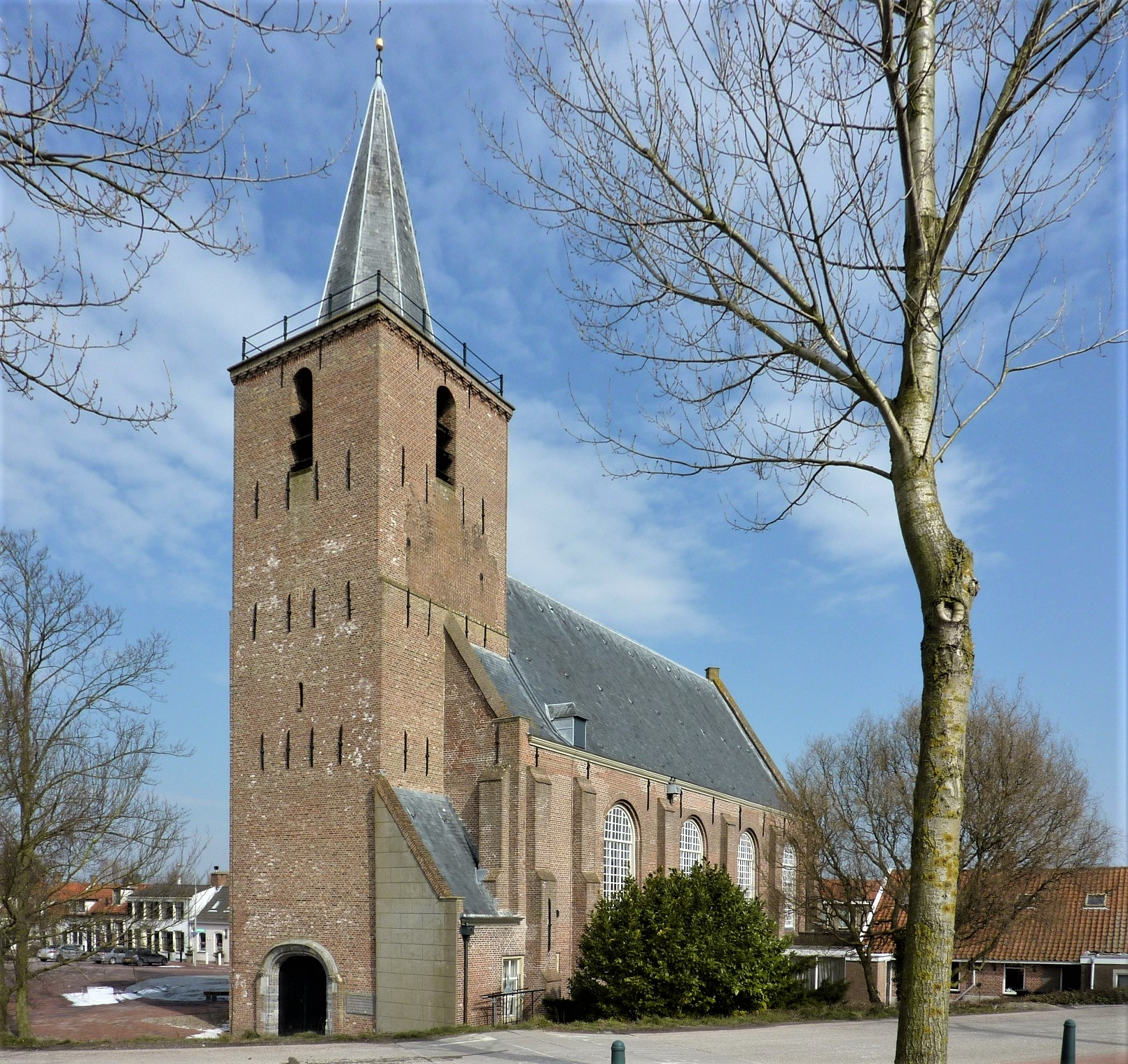
Nicolaaskerk, Kortgene

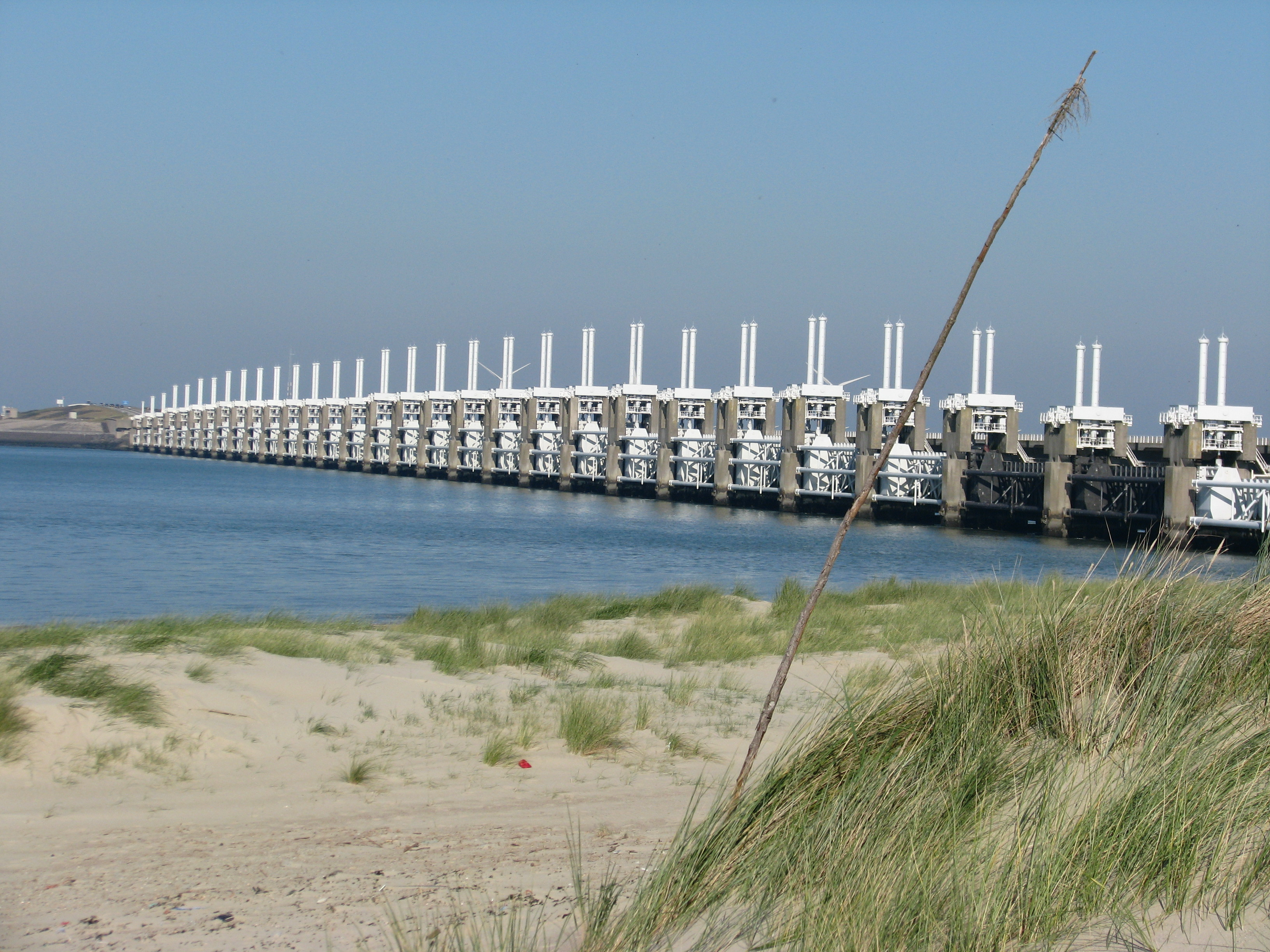
Kamperland

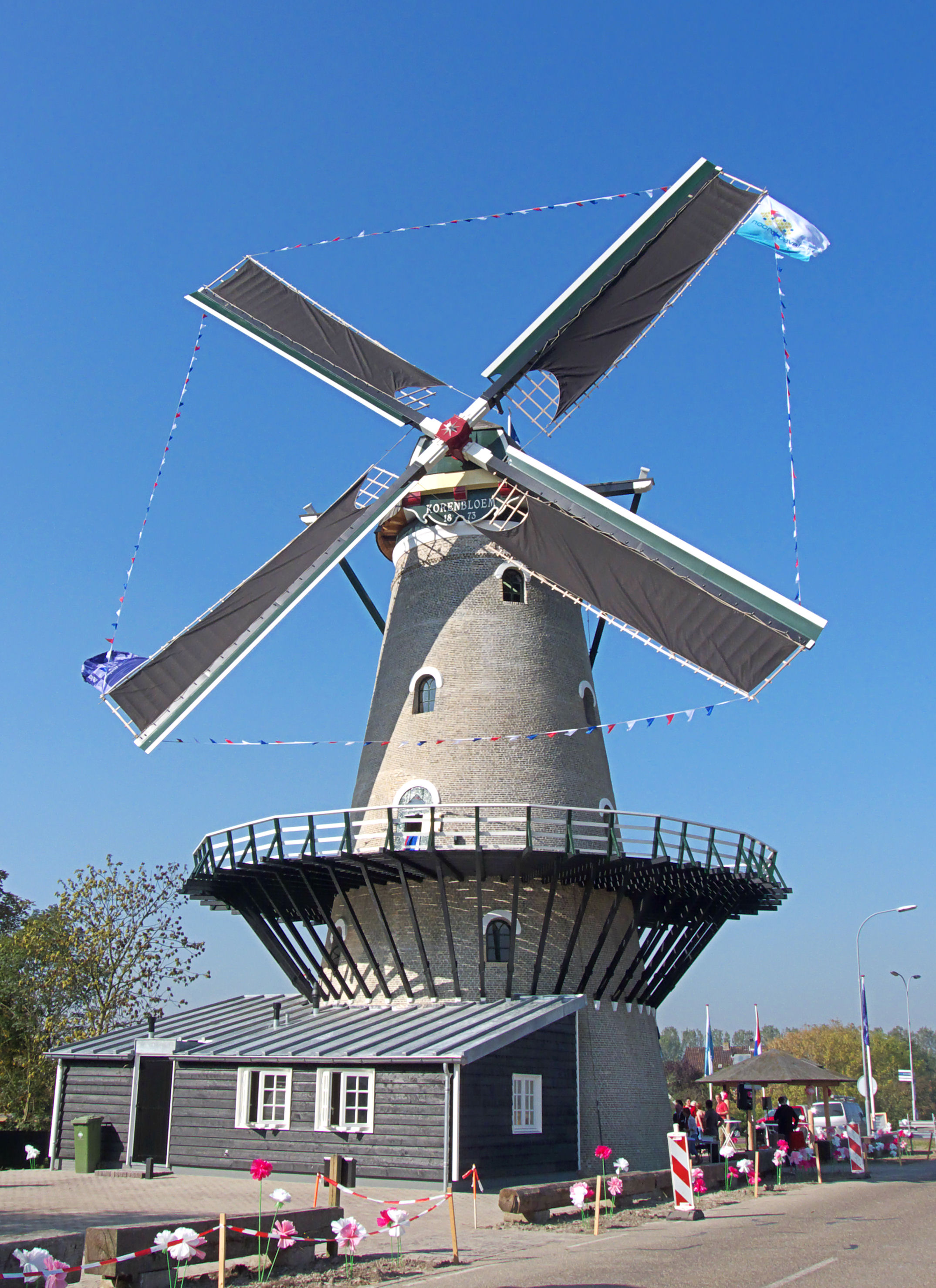
Molen De Korenbloem, Kortgene

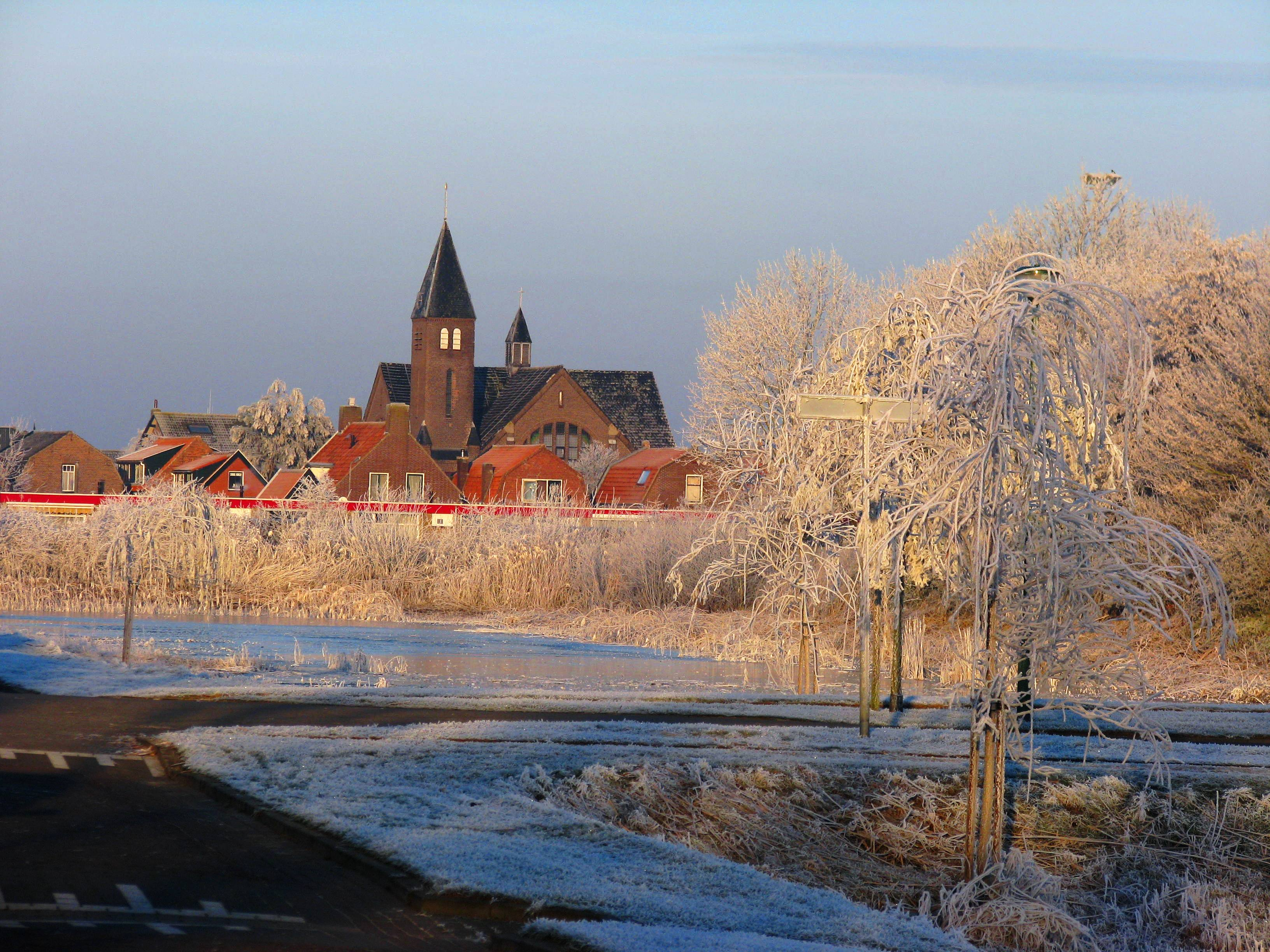
Vijver met kerk
