= Western Scheldt =

Estuary of the Scheldt river

Coordinates: 51°24′N 3°43′E

Designations

Ramsar Wetland
- Official name: Westerschelde & Saeftinghe
- Designated: 9 April 1995
- Reference no.: 748

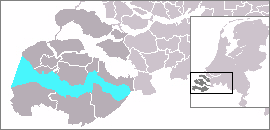
Western Scheldt (Westerschelde)

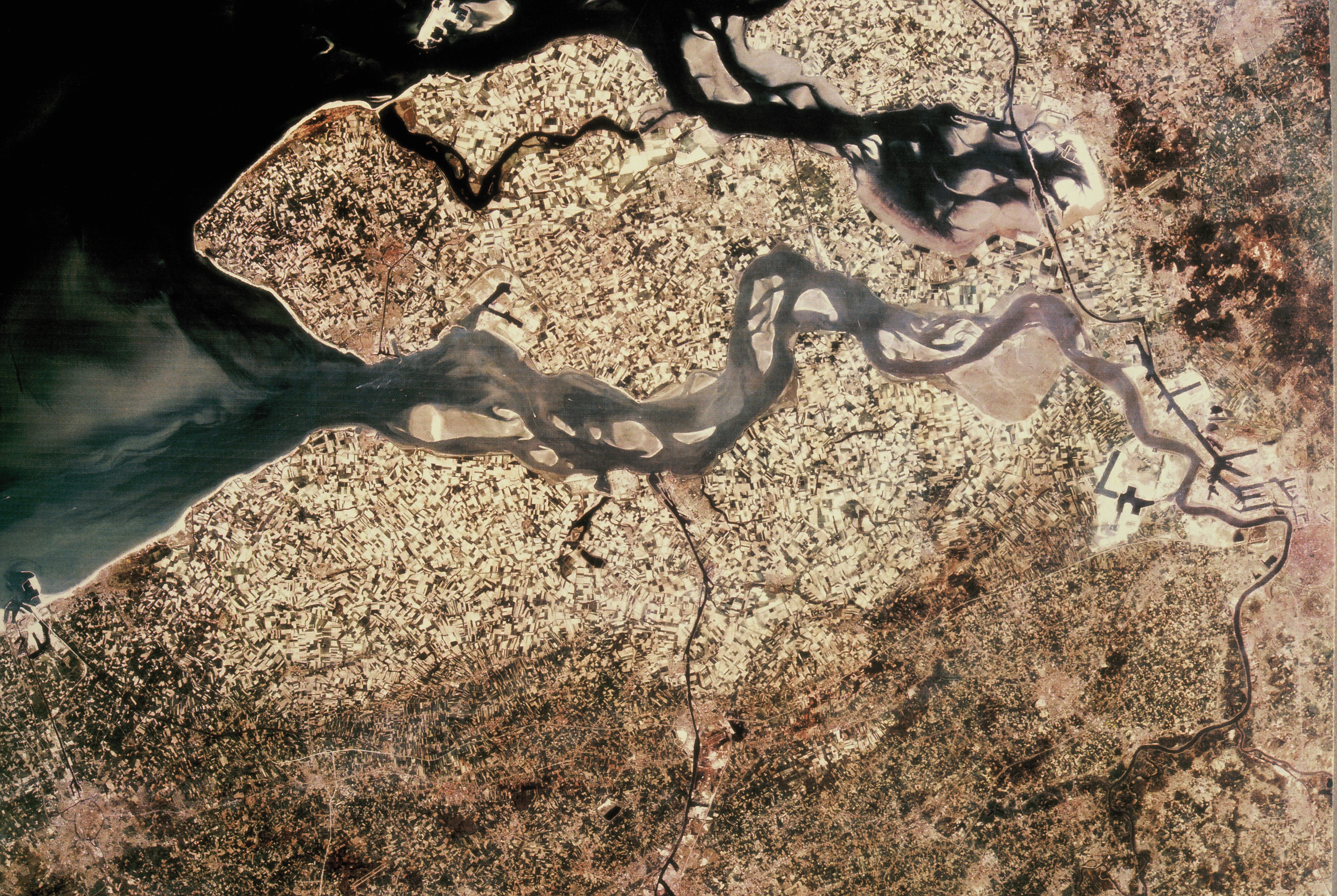
Satellite image of the Scheldt delta showing the Western Scheldt at low tide

The Western Scheldt (Dutch: Westerschelde [ˌʋɛs.tərˈsxɛl.də]), in the province of Zeeland in the southwestern Netherlands, is the estuary of the Scheldt river. This river once had several estuaries, but the others are now disconnected from the Scheldt, leaving the Westerschelde as its only direct route to the sea. The Western Scheldt is an important shipping route to the Port of Antwerp, Belgium. Unlike the Eastern Scheldt estuary, it could not be closed off from the sea by a dam as part of the Delta Works. Instead, the dykes around it have been heightened and reinforced.

Over the years, many ships have sunk in the Western Scheldt. Following an agreement between the Dutch and Belgian governments in 1995, many of the wrecks have been removed to improve shipping access to Antwerp. It was expected that the last 38 wrecks in the shipping channel would be removed during 2003. The largest wreck, which was removed in June 2003, was that of the 131-metre (430 ft) long Alan-A-Dale, sunk in December 1944 during the Second World War by a German Biber midget submarine.

The Western Scheldt was freed from German occupation in October and November 1944 by the First Canadian Army during the Battle of the Scheldt.

Recently, the Western Scheldt has been exploring the concept of "wisselpolders" or "exchange polders", a sedimentation enhancing strategy, to offset land loss, enhance flood safety and create new land. One example is the Perkpolder project.

== Western Scheldt Tunnel ==
In mid-March 2003, a 6.6-kilometre (4.1 mi) tunnel under the Western Scheldt opened, the Western Scheldt Tunnel, running from Ellewoutsdijk in the municipality of Borsele (Zuid-Beveland) to Terneuzen in Zeelandic Flanders. It is the longest road tunnel in the Netherlands. The toll (2012) is €5 for cars and €2.50 for motorcycles. Prior to 2011, the charge for motorcycles was the same as for cars, but it was reduced following protests. The single toll station for both directions is on the north bank. Pedestrians, cyclists, and moped riders are not allowed in the tunnel and must travel through it by bus.

== Ferry ==
The double-decker car ferries that serviced the two Western Scheldt crossings until 2003 were sold to Italian companies. The Queen Beatrix (renamed Tremestieri) and Prince Johan Friso (renamed Acciarello) were adapted for the crossing between Messina and Villa San Giovanni on the Italian mainland.

With the opening of the road tunnel, the Breskens-Vlissingen ferry was restricted to pedestrians and cyclists. It is operated by Westerschelde Ferry BV, a subsidiary of the province of Zeeland. The service initially used former car ferries, but as of 2 May 2004 it employs two "small waterplane area twinhulls" (swaths, similar to catamarans), built at the Royal Schelde Group in Vlissingen (Flushing), and named Prins Willem Alexander and Prinses Máxima.

Upstream, the Kruiningen-Perkpolder ferry was discontinued without replacement.

== See also ==
- Eastern Scheldt
- Zeeschelde
