= Walcheren =

Coordinates: 51°31′17″N 3°34′56″E

- Former Island
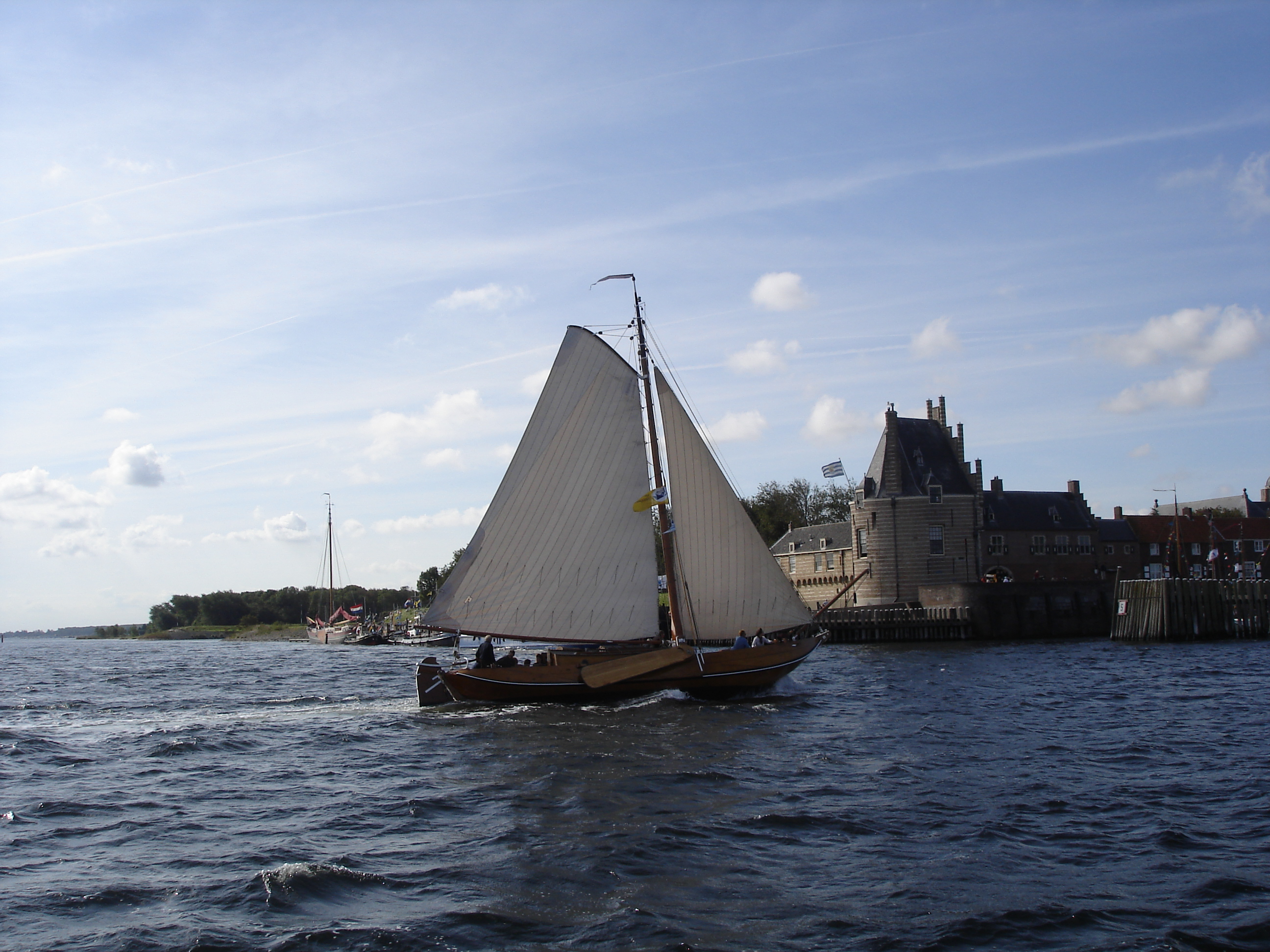
- Campveer Tower in Veere, built in 1500

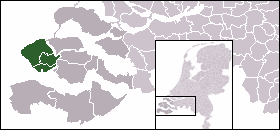
- Country: Netherlands
- Province: Zeeland
- Municipality: Middelburg; Veere; Vlissingen

Area
  - Total: 215.72 km^{2} (83.29 sq mi)

Population (2003)
  - Total: 113,546
  - Density: 526.36/km^{2} (1,363.3/sq mi)
- Postal code: 4330-4399
- COROP: Walcheren
- Area code: 0118
- Major roads: A58, N57
- Railway: Zeelandic line

Walcheren (Dutch pronunciation: [ˈʋɑlxərə(n)]) is a region and former island in the Dutch province of Zeeland at the mouth of the Scheldt estuary. It lies between the Eastern Scheldt in the north and the Western Scheldt in the south and is roughly the shape of a rhombus. The two sides facing the North Sea consist of dunes and the rest of its coastline is made up of dykes. Middelburg, the provincial capital, lies at Walcheren's centre. Vlissingen, 9 kilometres (5.6 mi) to the south, is the main harbour and the third municipality is Veere in the north.

Originally, Walcheren was an island, but the Sloedam, constructed in 1871 for a railway, and poldering after World War II have connected it to the (former) island of Zuid-Beveland, which in turn was connected to the North Brabant mainland by the Kreekrakdam (Completed in 1867). The Veerse Gatdam, completed in 1961, has connected Walcheren to Noord-Beveland.

== Etymology ==
Walcheren is first attested in Latinized spelling, such as villam Walichrum ca. 790 and Vualacra ca. 837. Germanic spellings start appearing around the High Middle Ages, like Old Dutch Walacheri ca. 1150. The name is most likely a compound of *wal(a)c, meaning "moist", and *heri/*hara, indicating a sandy ridge. Another, less likely theory suggests that the name derives from Walhaz, the name Germans used for Romans.

== History ==
=== Early history ===
The Romans called the island "Wallacra". As early as Roman times, the island functioned as a point of departure for ships going to Britain; it had a temple of the goddess Nehalennia who was popular with those who braved the waters of the North Sea.

Walcheren became the seat of the Danish Viking Harald (fl. 841–842), who conquered what would become the Netherlands together with his brother Rorik (fl. 842–873) (or Rurik) in the ninth century. One fringe theory has it that Ahmad ibn Rustah (fl. 10th century) described Walcheren when reporting on the seat of the Rus' Khaganate. Another fringe theory mentions Walcheren as the seat of Hades, described by Homer.

The island played a role in the defeat of the Spanish Armada in 1588. The Spanish fleet was not able to be supported by deep water ports along the continental side of the English Channel. The Duke of Parma had occupied Antwerp, a deep water port. However, access to this port was blocked by Dutch rebels and English fighters who occupied Walcheren. As a result, the armada could not be resupplied nor could it seek shelter at Antwerp. Facing dwindling supplies, Admiral Medina-Sedonia fled northward, ending the threat to the English.

=== Treaty of Dover ===
Under the Secret Treaty of Dover, concluded in 1670 between Charles II of England and Louis XIV of France, England was supposed to get possession of Walcheren as well as the isle of Cadzand, as the reward for helping France in the then impending war against the Dutch Republic. In the event, the Dutch resistance — much stronger than anticipated — managed to repulse the French-English attack, and the treaty was not implemented.

=== Napoleonic Wars ===
Beginning on 30 July 1809, a British expeditionary force of 39,000 men landed on Walcheren, intending to assist the Austrians in their efforts against Napoleon and attack the French Navy fleet moored at Flushing. The expedition turned into a disaster, as although British troops captured Flushing the Austrians had already been decisively defeated at the Battle of Wagram in early July and were suing for peace. Meanwhile, the French fleet had moved to Antwerp, and the expeditionary lost over 4,000 men to a disease called "Walcheren Fever", thought to be a combination of malaria and typhus, compared to only 106 men killed due to enemy action. The French and Dutch defenders, meanwhile, suffered approximately 162 killed. With the strategic reasons for the campaign gone and the worsening conditions, the British withdrew in December.

=== World War II ===
Strategically situated at the mouth of the River Scheldt, Walcheren was the key that allowed use of the deep-water port of Antwerp, located further upstream on the right bank of the southern estuary of the river. It was fought over during World War II in 1940 between Dutch and German troops in the Battle of the Netherlands, and again in 1944 in the Battle of Walcheren Causeway, the fourth and final stage of the Battle of the Scheldt. On 3 October 1944 the RAF bombed the sea wall at Westkapelle causing the Inundation of Walcheren. The 2nd Canadian Infantry Division cleared South Beveland to the east and approached the island on 31 October 1944. The plan was to cross the Sloe Channel, but leading troops of the 5th Canadian Infantry Brigade found that assault boats were useless in the deep mud of the channel. The only route open was the 40 metre wide Walcheren Causeway, a mile-long land bridge from South Beveland to the island. The Canadian Black Watch sent a company across on the evening of 31 October, but was stopped. The Calgary Highlanders sent two companies over in succession, the second attack opening up a bridgehead on the island. The Highlanders were eventually thrown back, having lost 64 killed and wounded. Le Régiment de Maisonneuve relieved them on the causeway, followed by the 1st Battalion, Glasgow Highlanders of the British 52nd Infantry Division. Meanwhile, on 1 November 1944, British Commandos landed in the village of Westkapelle in order to silence the German coastal batteries looking out over the Scheldt. The amphibious assault (Operation Infatuate) proved a success and by 8 November, all German resistance on the island had ceased.

== Topography ==
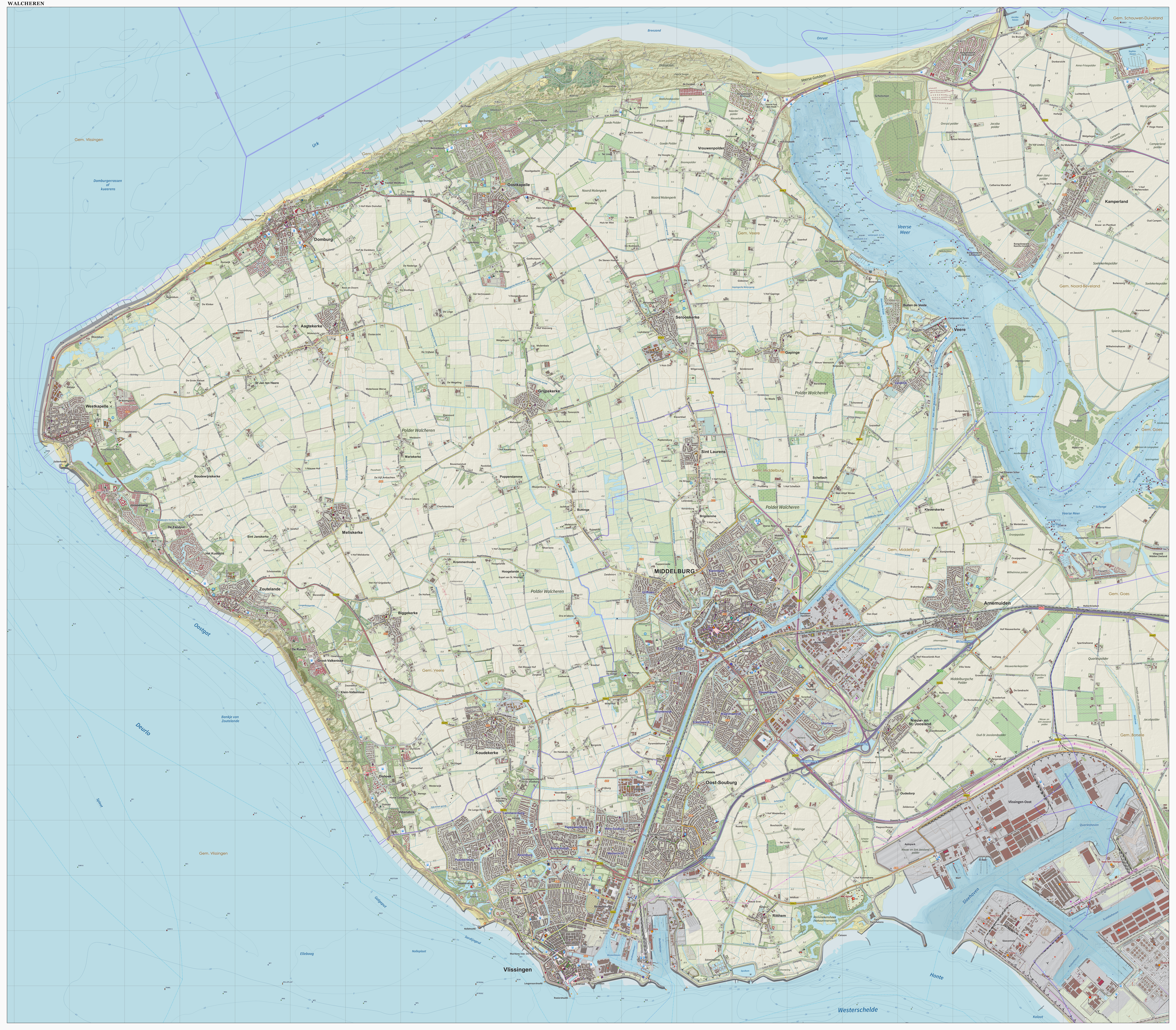

Topographic map of Walcheren, 2015-2016. Click to enlarge.

== See also ==
- Nehalennia
