= Zuid-Beveland =

Coordinates: 51.5°N 3.8°E

Zuid-Beveland South Beveland
- Peninsula
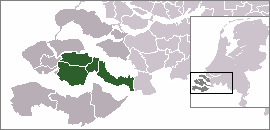
- Country: Netherlands
- Province: Zeeland
- Municipality: Borsele; Goes; Kapelle; Reimerswaal

Area
  - Total: 344.33 km^{2} (132.95 sq mi)

Population (August 2017)
  - Total: 95,389
  - Density: 267/km^{2} (690/sq mi)
- Postal code: 4400-4481
- Area code: 0113
- Major roads: A58, Zeeuwse lijn

Zuid-Beveland (Dutch: [ˈzœyd ˌbeːvəlɑnt]; "South Beveland") is part of the province of Zeeland in the Netherlands north of the Western Scheldt and south of the Eastern Scheldt.

== Topography ==
It is a former island, now peninsula, crossed by the Canal through Zuid-Beveland on the west and the Scheldt–Rhine Canal on the east.

It consists of four municipalities:

- Borsele
- Goes
- Kapelle
- Reimerswaal

Goes is Zuid-Beveland's principal urban center.

Zuid-Beveland is a former island which was joined (together with Walcheren) to the mainland by a railway embankment in 1903 and to Noord-Beveland by the Delta Works. A shipping canal connecting the Belgian port of Antwerp with the Rhine River traverses Zuid-Beveland.

== History ==
=== Third and fourth centuries ===
This was the period during which most of Zeeland appears to have been submerged. The area was and for several centuries would remain almost unpeopled.

=== Middle Ages ===
During the eleventh century the area began to be drained, as little by little polders and channels were developed to protect the fields between them. Once drained, salt levels began to reduce and the soil became very fertile. Agriculture developed and prosperity grew.

In the thirteenth century villages and towns began to appear. People lived chiefly from farming and fishing. The commercial centre of Zuid-Beveland was Goes, but Reimerswaal to the east, which later would be destroyed by floods also played an important role at this time.

=== The sixteenth and seventeenth centuries ===
As a result of the St. Felix's flood in November 1530, much of the island disappeared under water. Towns and villages were lost to what became known as the drowned land of Zuid-Beveland (Pays inondé de Zuid-Beveland / Verdronken Land van Zuid-Beveland). The island was again badly impacted forty years later in November 1570 by the All Saints' Day Flood (Allerheiligenvloed / Inondations de la Toussaint).

Between 1568 and 1648, during the course of what by its weary end had become the Eighty Years' War, the surviving lands of Zuid-Beveland were frequently in the military theatre of operations.

=== The eighteenth and nineteenth centuries ===
During most of this period the economy of the Netherlands slowed or contracted, with the exception of the agricultural sector. However, the region benefited from advances in transportation, connected in 1868 to Roosendaal by railroad with the inauguration of the Zeeland Line (la Zeeuwse Lijn: la «Ligne zélandaise»), the Roosendaal–Vlissingen railway. In 1850 work began on the Zuid-Beveland Canal which linked the Western Scheldt and the Eastern Scheldt across a narrow neck of land in the east of the province.

The construction in 1871 of the Sloedam, topped off with a roadway and a railway track, across the old Sloe Channel, connected Zuid-Beveland with Walcheren.

=== World War II ===
On 16 May 1940, heavy fighting occurred near Kapelle between German and French motorised troops, who came to the rescue of the Dutch. The next day 65 French soldiers were buried by the local people. After World War II every French soldier who was killed in the Netherlands during the war was brought to Kapelle. On 16 May 1950, the military cemetery on the edge of town was officially opened, with 217 French soldiers and 20 Moroccan soldiers in French service buried there; one Belgian soldier was also buried in the cemetery.

The area was liberated by British and Canadians during the Battle of the Scheldt in November 1944.

=== The Flood of 1953 ===
The North Sea flood on the night of 31 January and the morning of 1 February 1953 caused 1,836 deaths in the southwest of the Netherlands. Because of the relative high altitude, most parts of Zuid-Beveland (mainly the area of Goes) were relatively safe. In particular the eastern part of the peninsula suffered from floods. To prevent future floods, the Delta Works were started in 1950. As a side-effect, the connection with the rest of the country improved too.

== Landscape and land-use ==
The soil primarily consists of marine clay. The landscape is dominated by dikes surrounding polders, due to recurring periods of floods and land reclamation. The main land-use is agricultural, of which consists primarily of crop cultivation and fruit orchards. Urban land-use is limited to the towns of Goes and Kapelle and several smaller towns and villages. Industrial activities are concentrated in the west of the peninsula (the Sloe area).

== Economic activities ==
Agriculture, in particular crop cultivation, livestock breeding, aquaculture and fruit orchards are the economic mainstays. South Beveland specializes in the growing of wheat, potatoes, sugar beets, and fruits and is also known for its fisheries and oyster culture. Zuid-Beveland is also home to Europe's largest greenhouse, located near Kapelle.

The Zak van Zuid-Beveland (a large fruit orchard area) is Zuid-Beveland's main touristic attraction. In spring the blooming trees and the small-scale landscape make for a popular place for outdoor activities. The historic steam train from Goes to Borssele crosses this area. The many waters surrounding Zuid-Beveland are a popular place for water sports, in particular the Veerse Meer.

== Transport ==
The main road in Zuid-Beveland is the motorway A58, connecting Flushing and Eindhoven. The highway A256/N256 connects the peninsula to the north (Noord-Beveland, Zierikzee and Rotterdam). The highway N62 is the connection to the south (Zeelandic Flanders and Belgium), by means of the Western Scheldt Tunnel: a 6.6 kilometres (4.1 miles) tunnel under the Western Scheldt estuary between Ellewoutsdijk and Terneuzen. It is the longest tunnel for highway traffic in The Netherlands and replaced the former ferry between Kruiningen and Perkpolder 2003.

More or less parallel to the motorway, a railroad connects Zuid-Beveland to Roosendaal, the Roosendaal–Vlissingen railway, with stations in (from west to east) Goes, Kapelle-Biezelinge, Kruiningen-Yerseke, Rilland-Bath and Krabbendijke. A cargo railroad connects the main railway with the industrial area Sloe, near Flushing. A historical steam train connects Goes and Hoedekenskerke, but this railroad nowadays only serves touristic purposes.

The Western Scheldt is an important shipping route to the Port of Antwerp. The Canal through Zuid-Beveland connects the Western and Eastern Scheldt. The more eastern Scheldt–Rhine Canal connects Antwerp and the Volkerak. The Eastern Scheldt and Veerse Meer are popular with pleasure boats.
