= Westkapelle-Binnen =

Coordinates: 51°31′45″N 3°26′27″E

Westkapelle-Binnen is a former municipality in the Dutch province of Zeeland. It existed until 1816, when it merged with Westkapelle-Buiten en Sirpoppekerke to form the new municipality of Westkapelle. The municipality consisted only of the village of Westkapelle, not including any surrounding countryside.

Westkapelle has been part of Veere since 1997.
