= Westkapelle-Buiten en Sirpoppekerke =

Coordinates: 51°32′13″N 3°27′34″E

Westkapelle-Buiten en Sirpoppekerke is a former municipality in the Dutch province of Zeeland. It existed until 1816, when it merged with Westkapelle-Binnen to form the new municipality Westkapelle. The municipality covered the countryside north and south of the town of Westkapelle, and the former hamlet Poppekerke.

Westkapelle has been part of Veere since 1997.
