= Joossesweg =

- Neighbourhood
- Location in the province of Zeeland in the Netherlands Joossesweg (Netherlands)
- Coordinates: 51°30′56″N 3°27′22″E
- Country: Netherlands
- Province: Zeeland
- Municipality: Veere

Area
  - Total: 0.41 km^{2} (0.16 sq mi)
- Elevation: 1.2 m (3.9 ft)

Population (2021)
  - Total: 15
  - Density: 37/km^{2} (95/sq mi)
- Time zone: UTC+1 (CET)
  - Summer (DST): UTC+2 (CEST)
- Postal code: 4361
- Dialing code: 0118

Joossesweg is a neighbourhood of Westkapelle in the Dutch province of Zeeland. It is a part of the municipality of Veere. It is a bungalow park near the sea.
