= Veere =

Veere Ter Veere (Zeeuws)
- Municipality and town
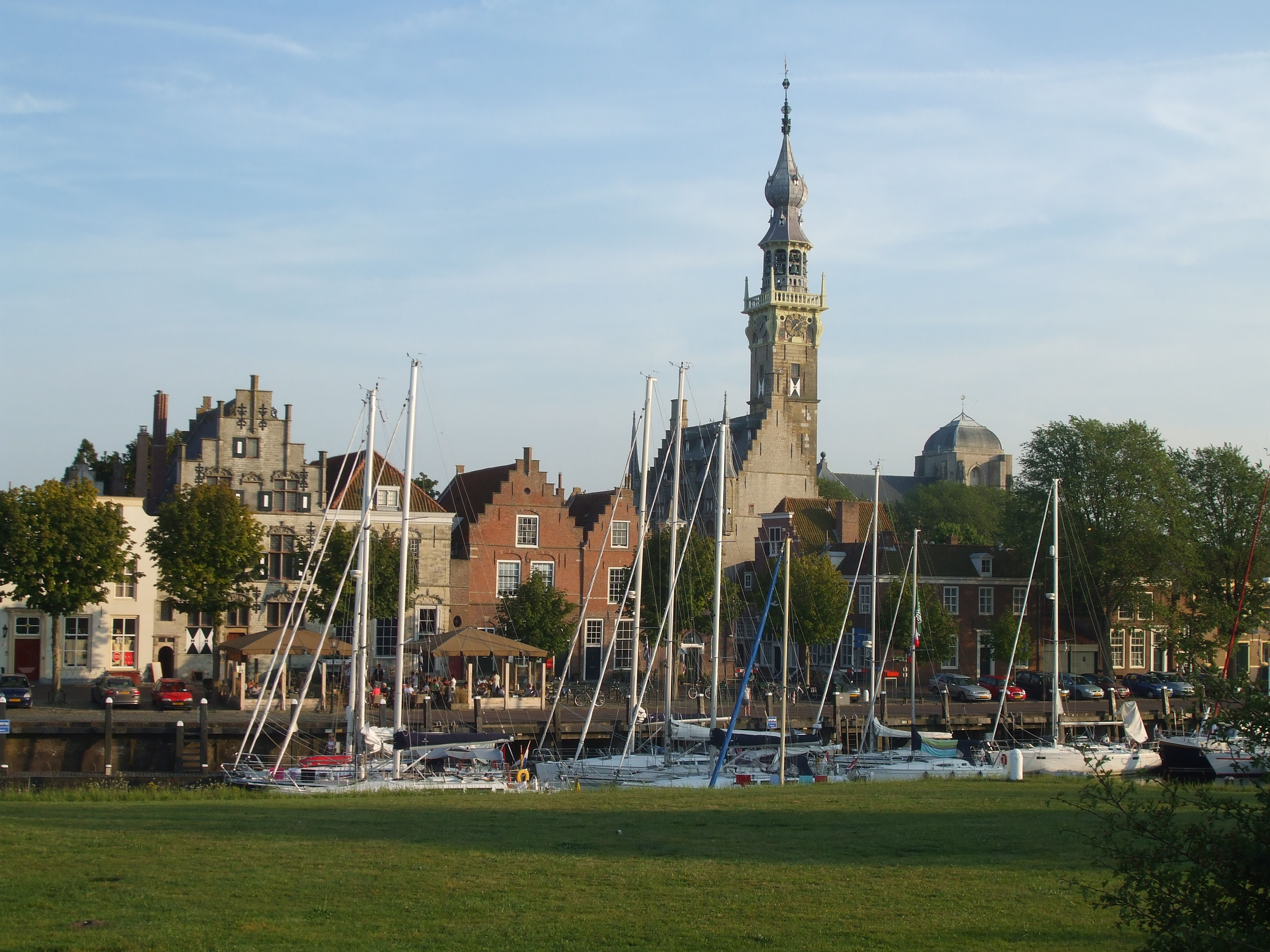
- The city of Veere in 2007

- Flag Coat of arms

- Location in Zeeland
- Coordinates: 51°32′53″N 3°40′00″E
- Country: Netherlands
- Province: Zeeland

Government
  - Body: Municipal council
  - Mayor: Frederiek Schouwenaar (VVD)

Area
  - Total: 206.55 km^{2} (79.75 sq mi)
  - Land: 132.56 km^{2} (51.18 sq mi)
  - Water: 73.99 km^{2} (28.57 sq mi)
- Elevation: 0 m (0 ft)

Population (January 2021)
  - Total: 21,953
  - Density: 166/km^{2} (430/sq mi)
- Time zone: UTC+1 (CET)
  - Summer (DST): UTC+2 (CEST)
- Postcode: 4350–4379
- Area code: 0118
- Website: www.veere.nl

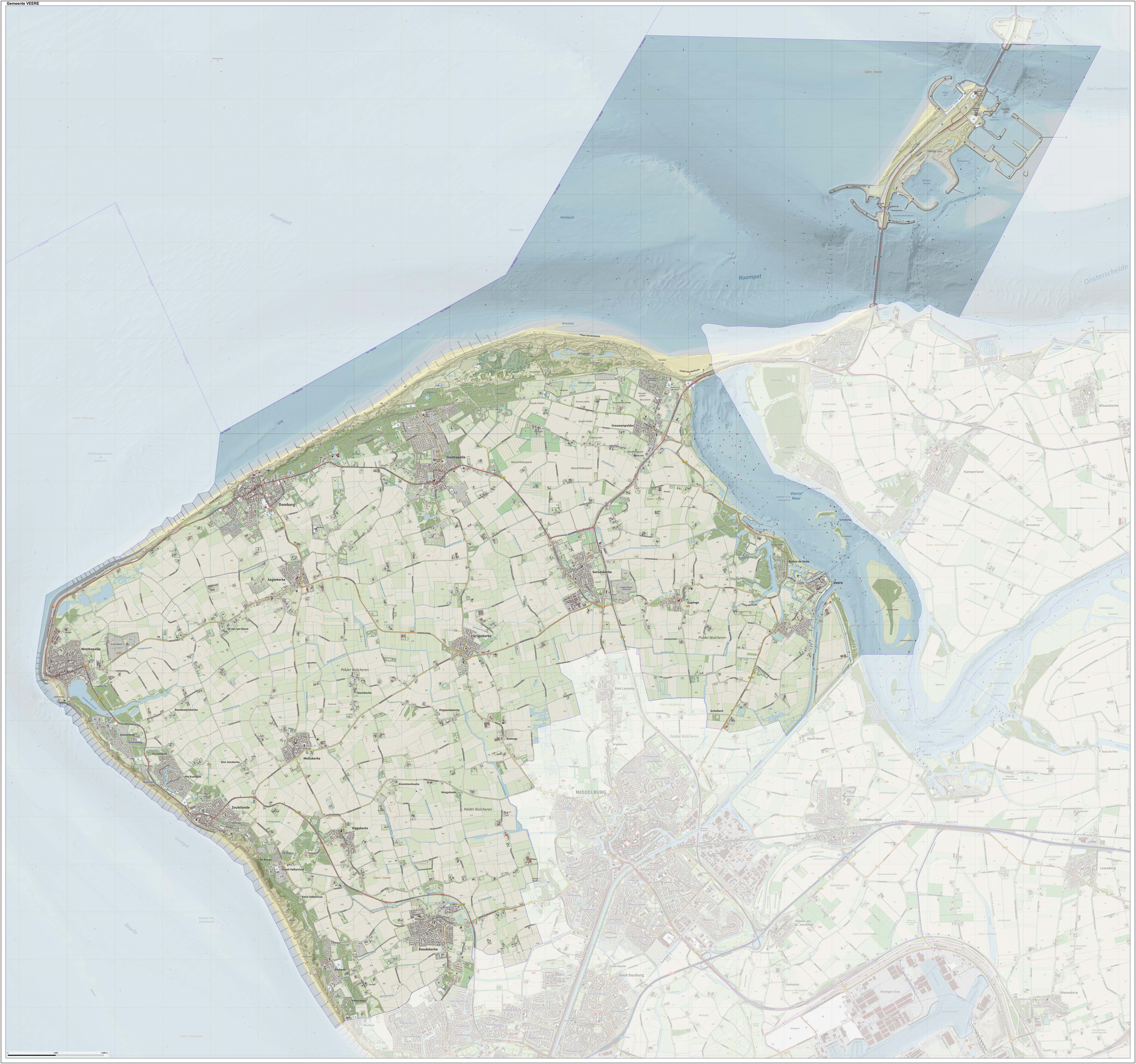
Municipality of Veere in 2015

Veere (Dutch: [ˈveːrə]; Zeelandic: Ter Veere) is a municipality with a population of 22,000 and a town with a population of 1,500 in the southwestern Netherlands, in the region of Walcheren in the province of Zeeland.

== History ==
The name Veere means "ferry": Wolfert I van Borselen established a ferry and ferry house there in 1281. This ferry he called the "camper-veer" or "Ferry of Campu" by which name Camphire it was known, at least in England, until the seventeenth century. It eventually became known as "de Veer". In the same year 1281 Wolfert also built the castle Sandenburg on one of the dikes he had built.

On 12 November 1282, Floris V, Count of Holland thereupon issued a charter by which Wolfert received the sovereignty to the land and castle with the ferry and ferry house. From that time on Wolfert was given the title of Lord Van der Veer. Veere received city rights in 1355.

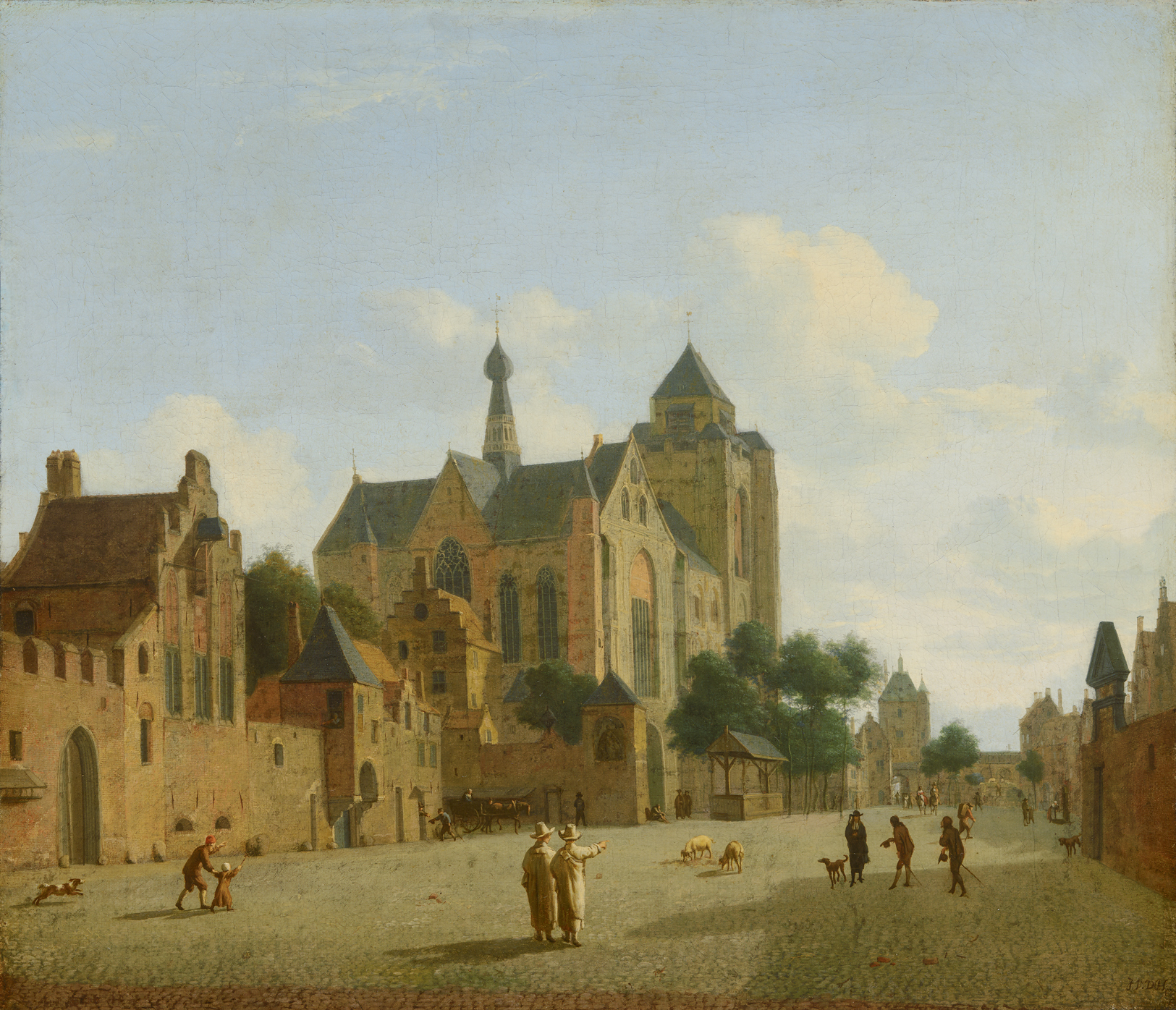
The church in Veere, by Jan van der Heyden (1637–1712)

The "Admiraliteit van Veere" (Admiralty of Veere) was set up as a result of the Ordinance on the Admiralty of 8 January 1488 in an attempt to create a central naval administration in the Burgundian Netherlands. To this was subordinated the Vice-Admiralty of Flanders in Dunkirk. In 1560 under admiral Philip de Montmorency, Count of Hoorn, this admiralty relocated near Ghent and in 1561 the Habsburg naval forces were also moved to Veere.

Veere functioned as the staple port for Scotland between 1541 and 1799. In Scotland it was known as Campvere. Until the Anglo-Dutch wars it was an important trading port for the import among other things, of saffron from East Anglian ports such as Wells.

Flemish architects Antonis Keldermans and Evert Spoorwater designed the Grote Kerk, the fortifications, the Cisterne and the town hall. During this period of prosperity, the cultural centre was located at Sandenburgh castle, the residence of the noble Van Borsele and Van Bourgondië families. Court painter Jan Gossaert van Mabuse worked here. The poet Adrianus Valerius lived and worked in the city from 1591. In the 17th and 18th centuries, Veere was a prosperous trading city, with about 750 houses inside the city walls then, compared to about 300 as of 2013.

At the start of the Second World War, there was a Royal Netherlands Navy seaplane base at Veere, with six Fokker C XIV-W aircraft. On 12 May 1940 the base was bombed by He 111 bombers causing some casualties. On 14 May, the seaplanes were ordered to evacuate to France and then England, eventually arriving in the Dutch East Indies where they would be destroyed in action with the Japanese in 1941 and 1942. On 17 May, German infantry of SS Regiment Deutschland of the 2nd SS Panzer Division crossed onto Walcheren via the Sloedam and by 18:00 that evening, the Dutch forces on the island, including the garrison at Veere, were ordered to surrender. Veere was finally liberated on 7 November 1944 by Scottish troops of the British 52nd (Lowland) Infantry Division during Operation Infatuate, the Allied assault on Walcheren. As part of the preparations for the operation, the island's sea dykes were bombed resulting in the inundation of much of the area. Unlike many other towns on the island, Veere was virtually undamaged in the fighting.

As a result of the damming of the Veerse Gat inlet in 1961, the fishing fleet of Veere moved to a new home port at Colijnsplaat on Noord-Beveland. As of 2013 the main business of the town is tourism.

Veere municipality reached its current expanded area in 1997, after the addition of several neighboring towns. During the course of nearly two centuries seventeen historical municipalities have merged to become present-day Veere. Its original full name was Veere-de-Stad en Zanddijk-Binnen.

== Geography ==
The city of Veere stands on the Veerse Meer lagoon on the island of Walcheren in the province of Zeeland in the Netherlands.

The area of the municipality of Veere is 13,496 hectares, with a coastline of 34 kilometres and a population of about 22,000.

=== Population centres ===
The population centres in the municipality are:

- Aagtekerke (population as of 2003: 1,479)
- Biggekerke (895)
- Domburg (1,481)
- Gapinge (522)
- Grijpskerke (1,377)
- Joossesweg (20)
- Koudekerke (3,620)
- Meliskerke (1,477)
- Oostkapelle (2,451)
- Serooskerke (1,833)
- Veere (1,520)
- Vrouwenpolder (1,125)
- Westkapelle (2,672)
- Zoutelande (1,593)

== Tourism ==
The area is visited by 4 million tourists annually. The main attractions are the beaches and marinas. The Storm Surge Barrier on the Oosterschelde is the most popular visitor attraction in Zeeland. The Scoutcentrum Zeeland on the coast of the Veerse Meer attracts Scout visitors from around the world.

== In fiction ==
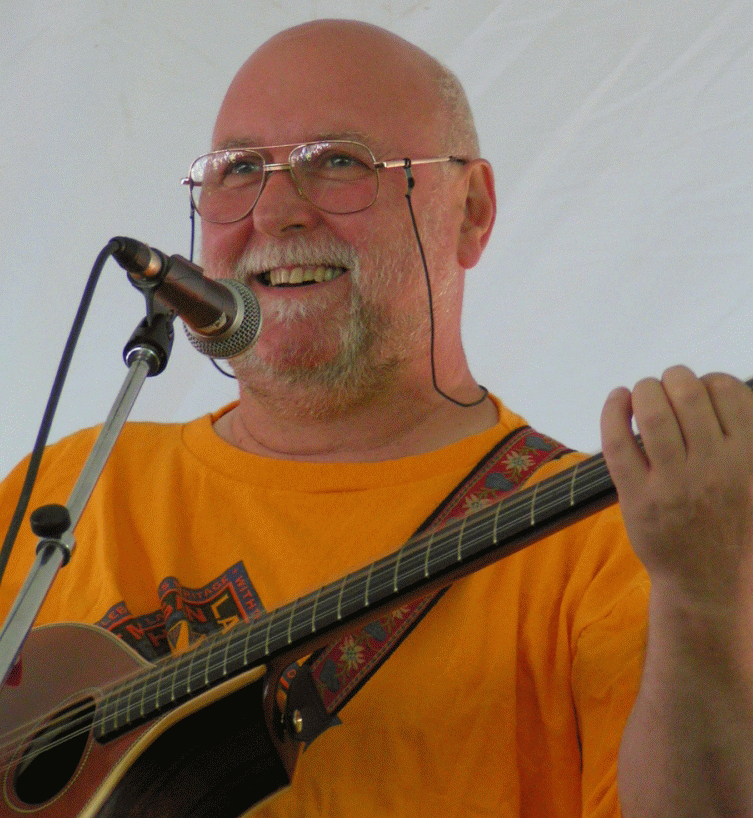
Brian McNeill, 2006

The town of Veere forms the setting for "Van Loon's Lives", a book of contemporary fantasy written by Hendrik Willem Van Loon in 1942, in which the protagonists are able to magically summon the great men and women of history for weekend dinner parties, leading to often humorous incidents. The book was written at the time when Veere, like the rest of the Netherlands, lay under Nazi occupation, and despite its light-hearted tone clearly indicates the longing of the writer – living in the US – for his homeland whose liberation he was doomed never to see.

Scottish singer-songwriter Brian McNeill based the song "The Holland Trade" from his tenth studio album The Baltic tae Byzantium on the trade and cultural ties between Veere and Scotland from 1541.

== Notable people ==
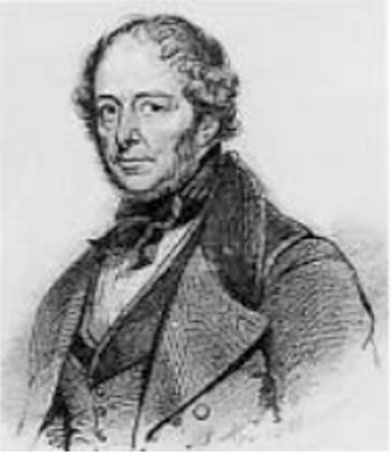
Johannes Hermanus Koekkoek, ca. 1810

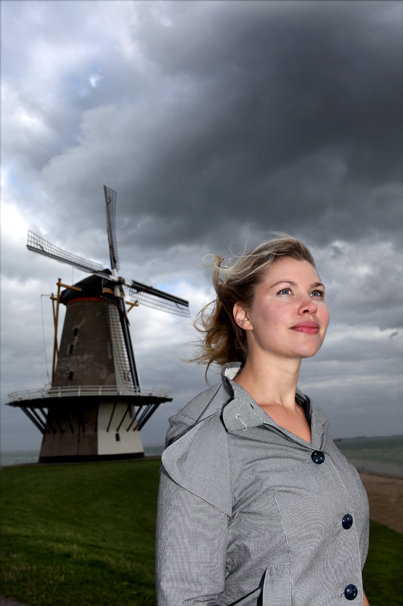
Franca Treur, 2010

- Maryn Adriansen (1600 in Veere – ca.1654) a boatswain and early settler to New Netherland
- Peter Daane (1835 in Westkapelle – 1914) an American businessman and politician in Wisconsin
- Peter de Ru (born 1946 in Oostkapelle) a photographer in Sweden
- Maximiliaan de Vriendt (1559 at Zandenburg Castle, Veere – 1614) a Neo-Latin poet
- Jurn de Vries (born 1940 in Vrouwenpolder) a theologian, former politician and journalist
- Nicolaas Everaerts (1461/62 in Grijpskerke – 1532) a jurist and academic
- Johannes Gabrielse (1881 in Westkapelle – 1945) a Dutch artist in the Dutch East Indies
- Wim Hofman (born 1941 in Oostkapelle) an author
- Johannes Hermanus Koekkoek (1778 in Veere – 1851) a painter and draughtsman
- Aert H. Kuipers (1919 in Oostkapelle or Middelburg – 2012) a linguistics professor who did fieldwork among First Nations people of British Columbia
- Hans Peter Minderhoud (born 1973 in Westkapelle) a dressage rider
- Matthijs Röling (1943 in Oostkapelle – 2024) a painter, graphic designer, draftsman and lithographer
- Franca Treur (born 1979 near Meliskerke) a writer and a freelance journalist
- Gerard von Brucken Fock (1859 in Koudekerke – 1935) a classical pianist, composer and painter
- Hans Wijers (born 1951 in Oostburg) a retired politician and chairman of the ING Group since 2018.

== Gallery ==
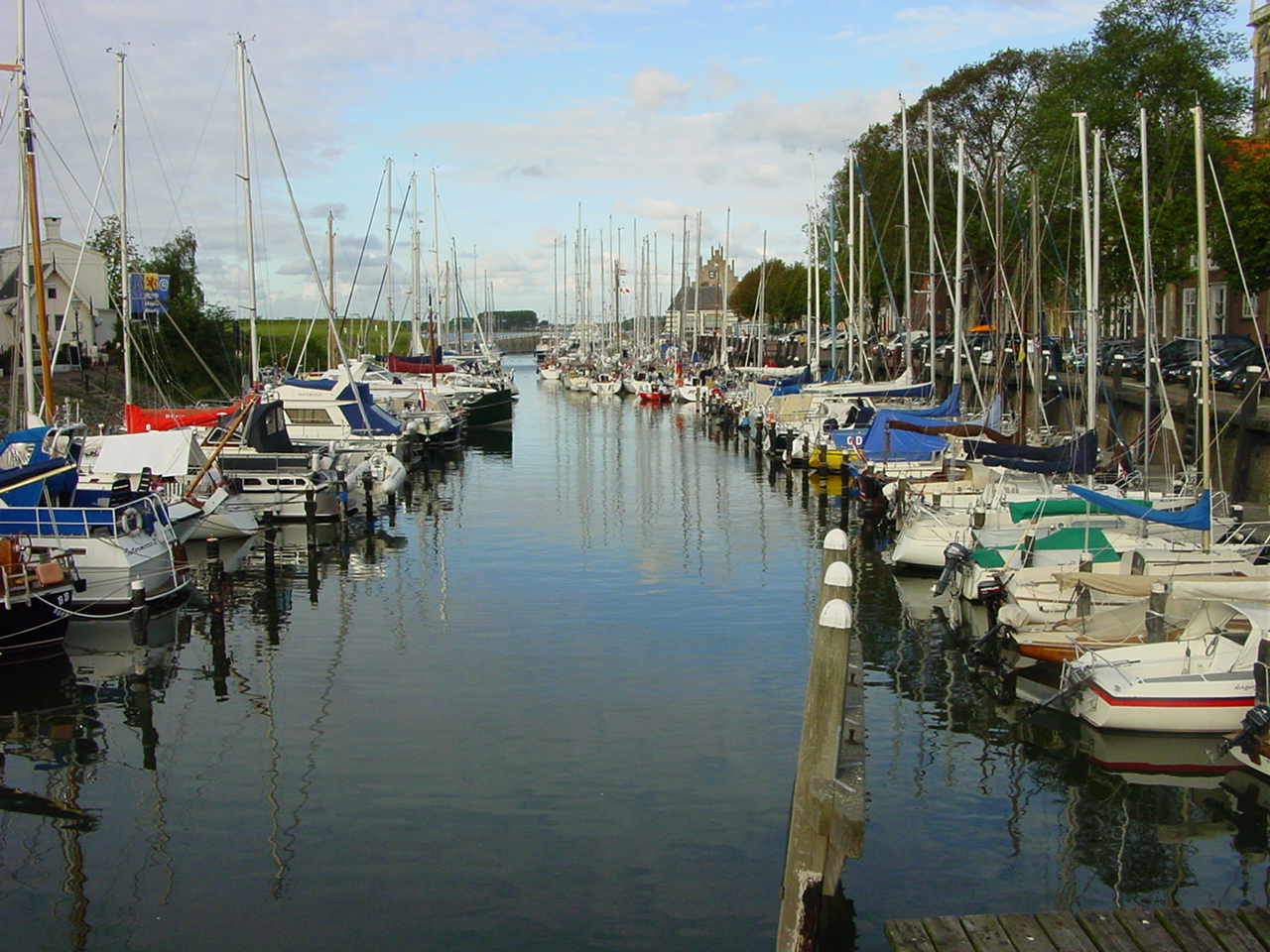
Harbour of Veere

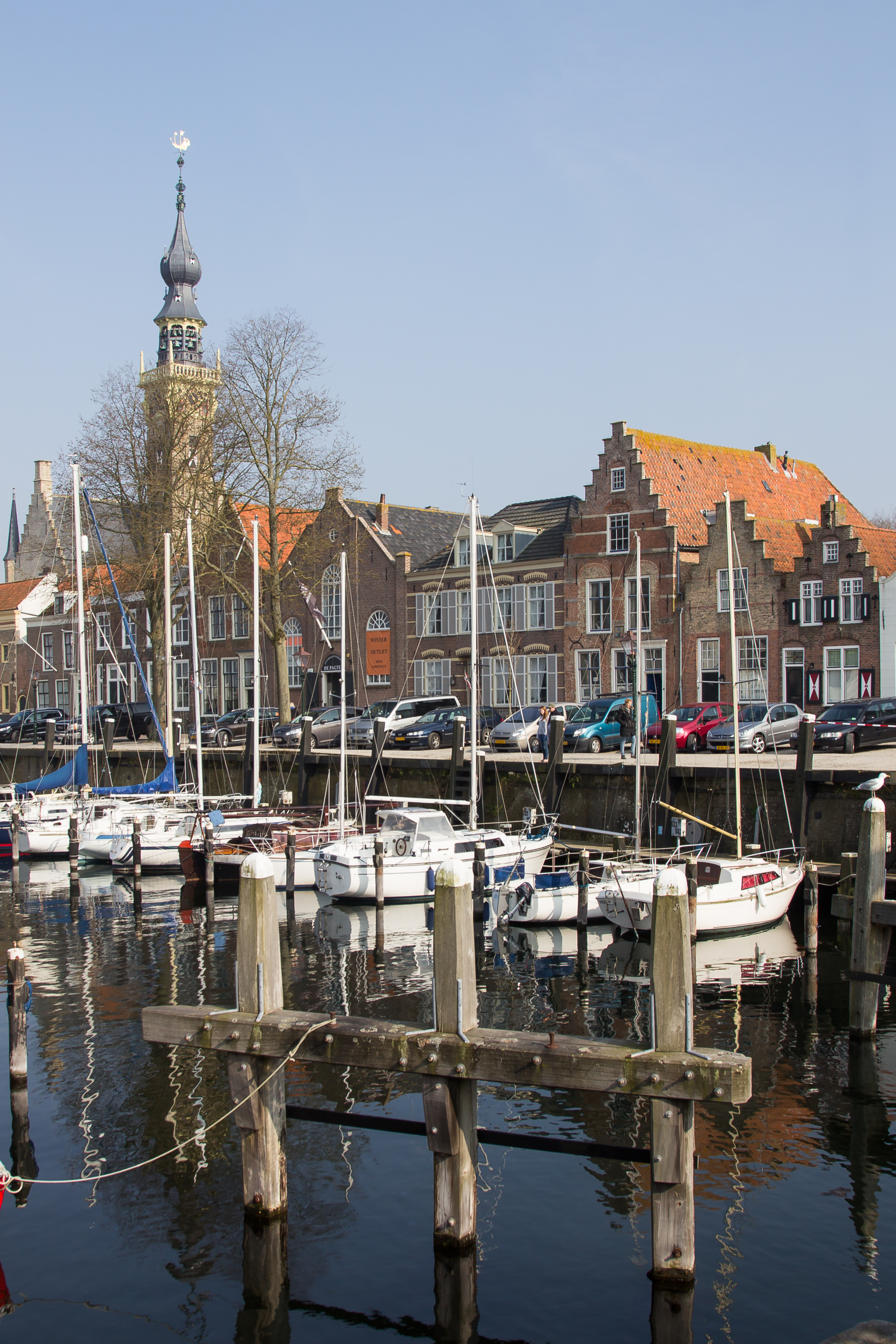
Harbour of Veere

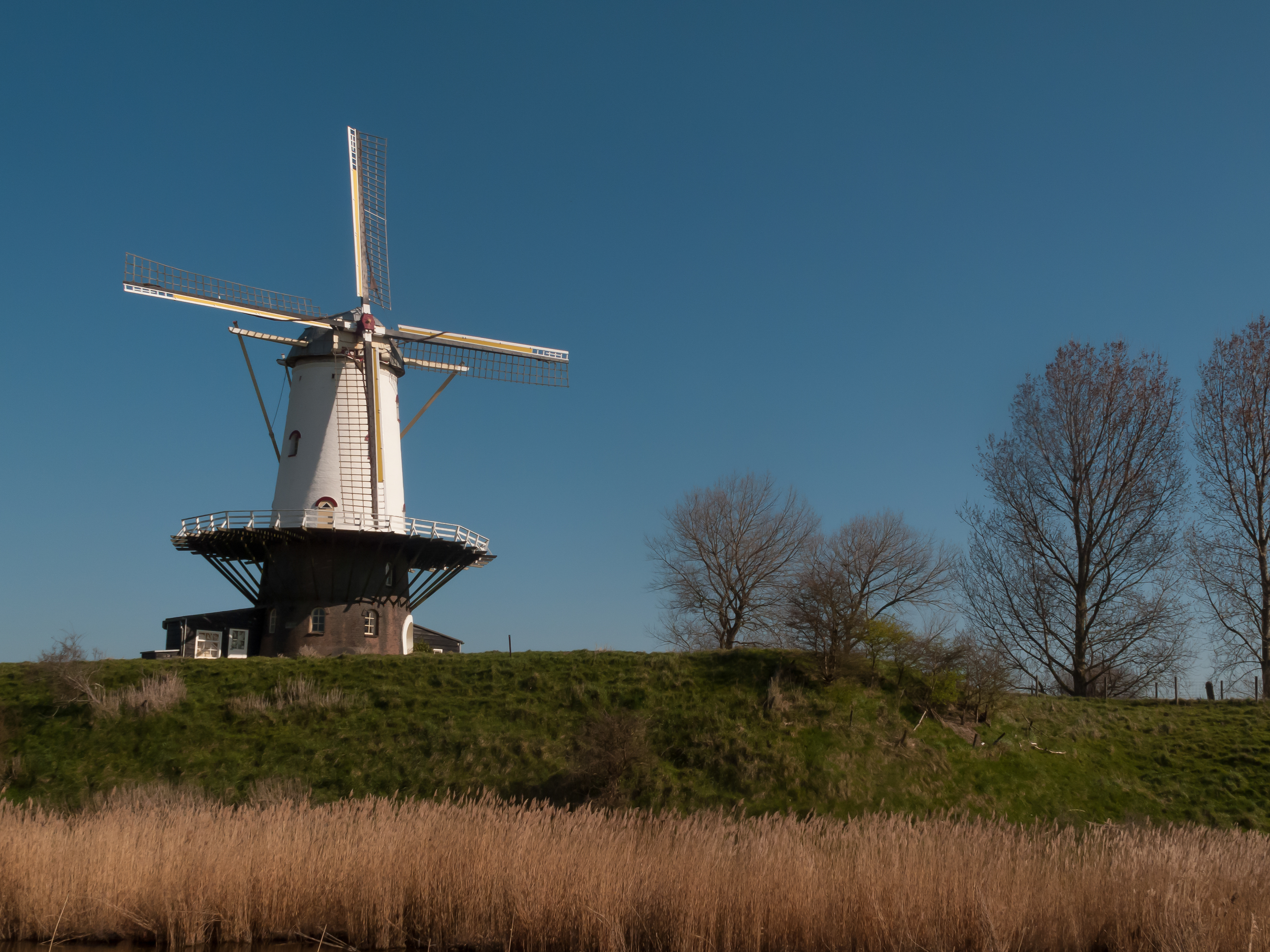
Windmill: The "de Koe" corn windmill

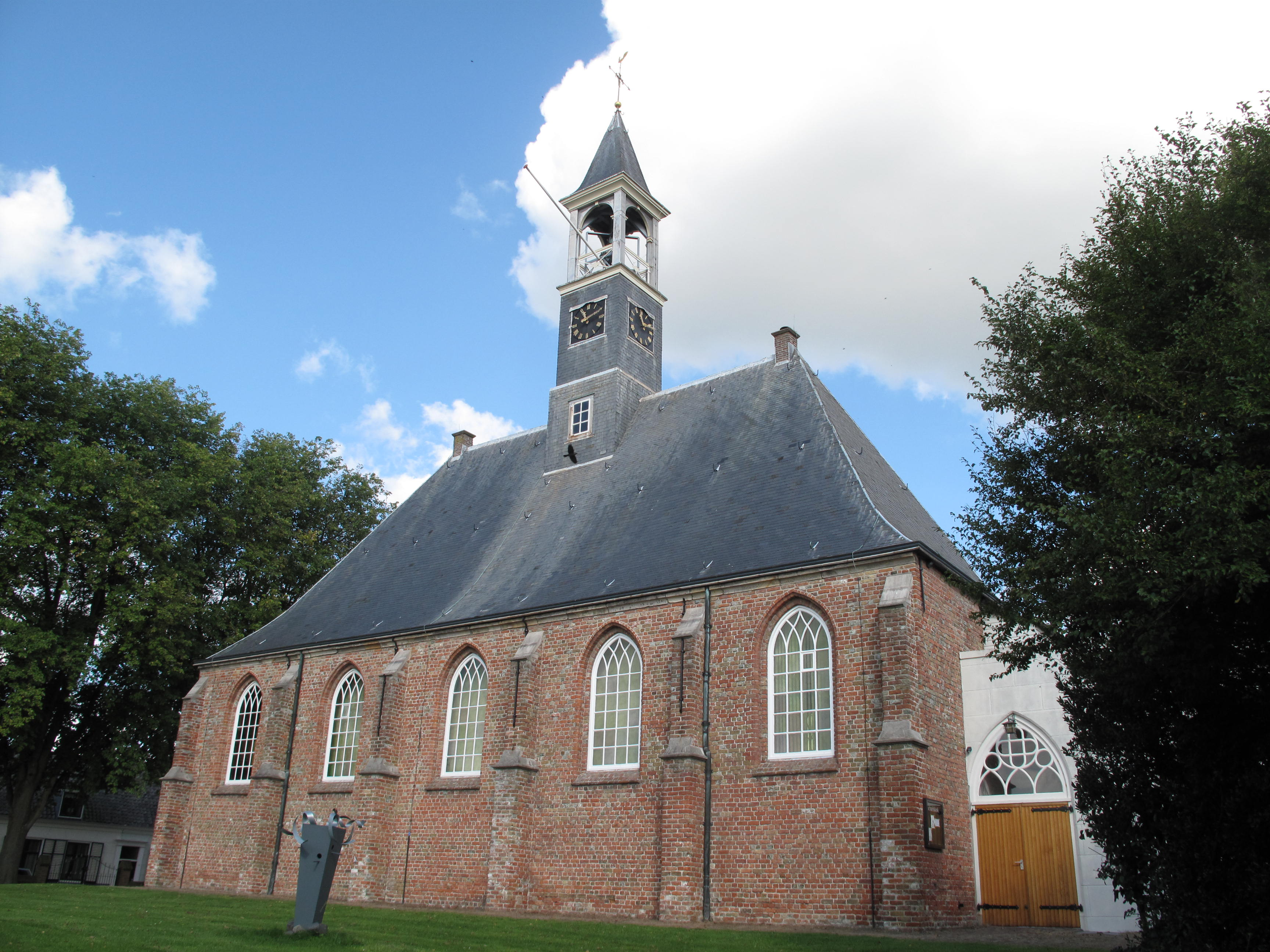
Koudekerke, church: Michaëlskerk

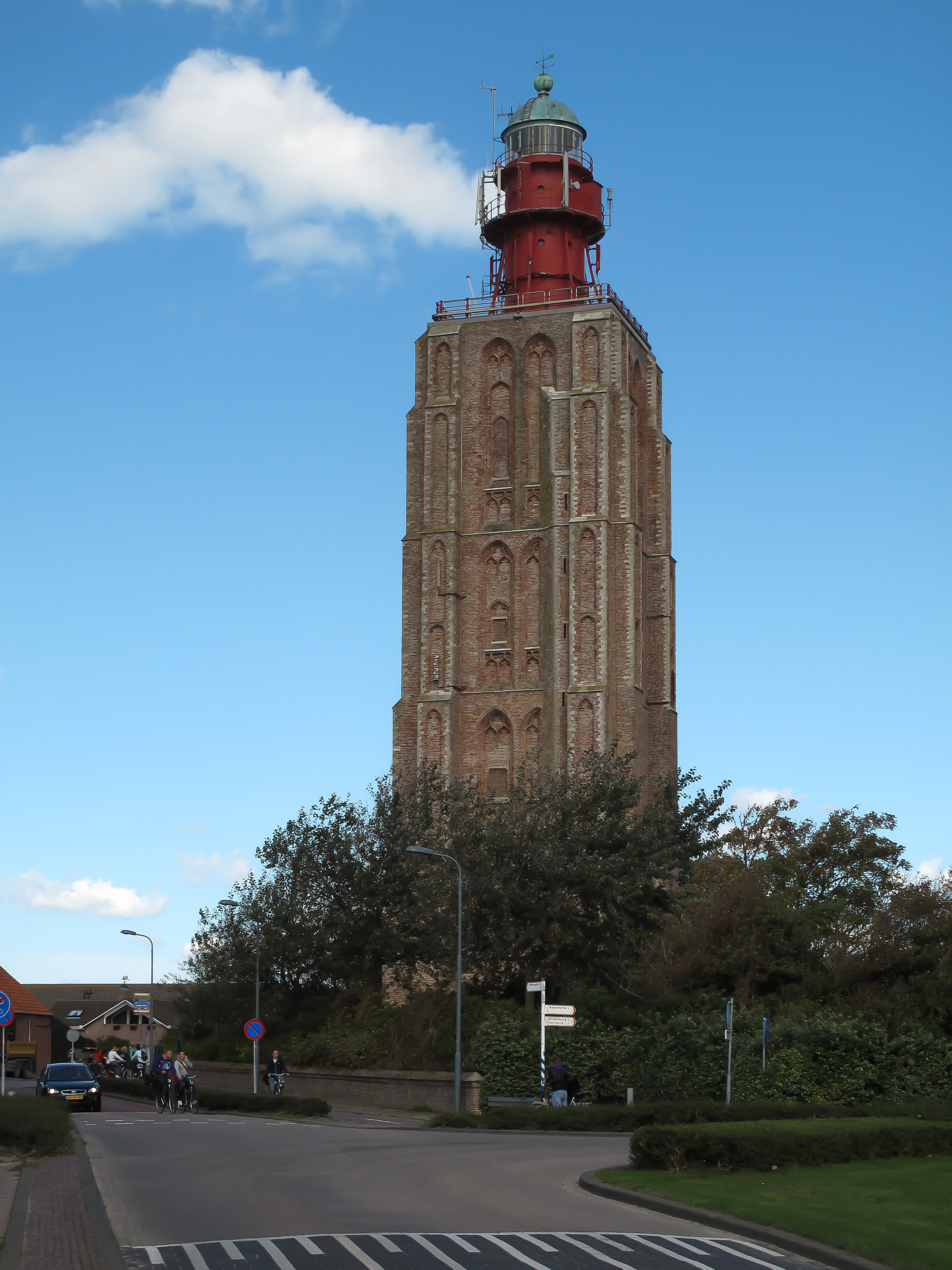
Westkapelle, light house

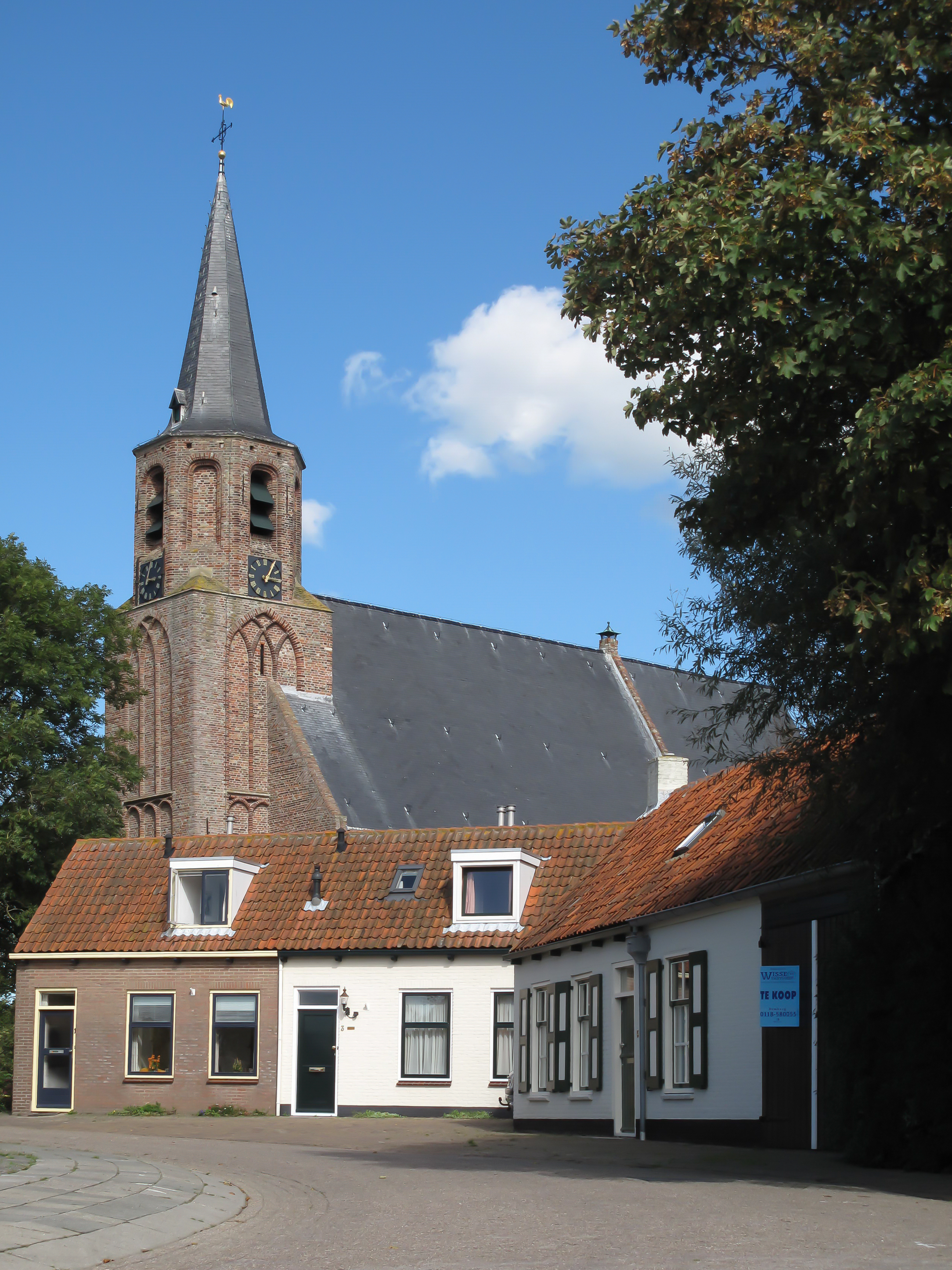
Gapinge, church

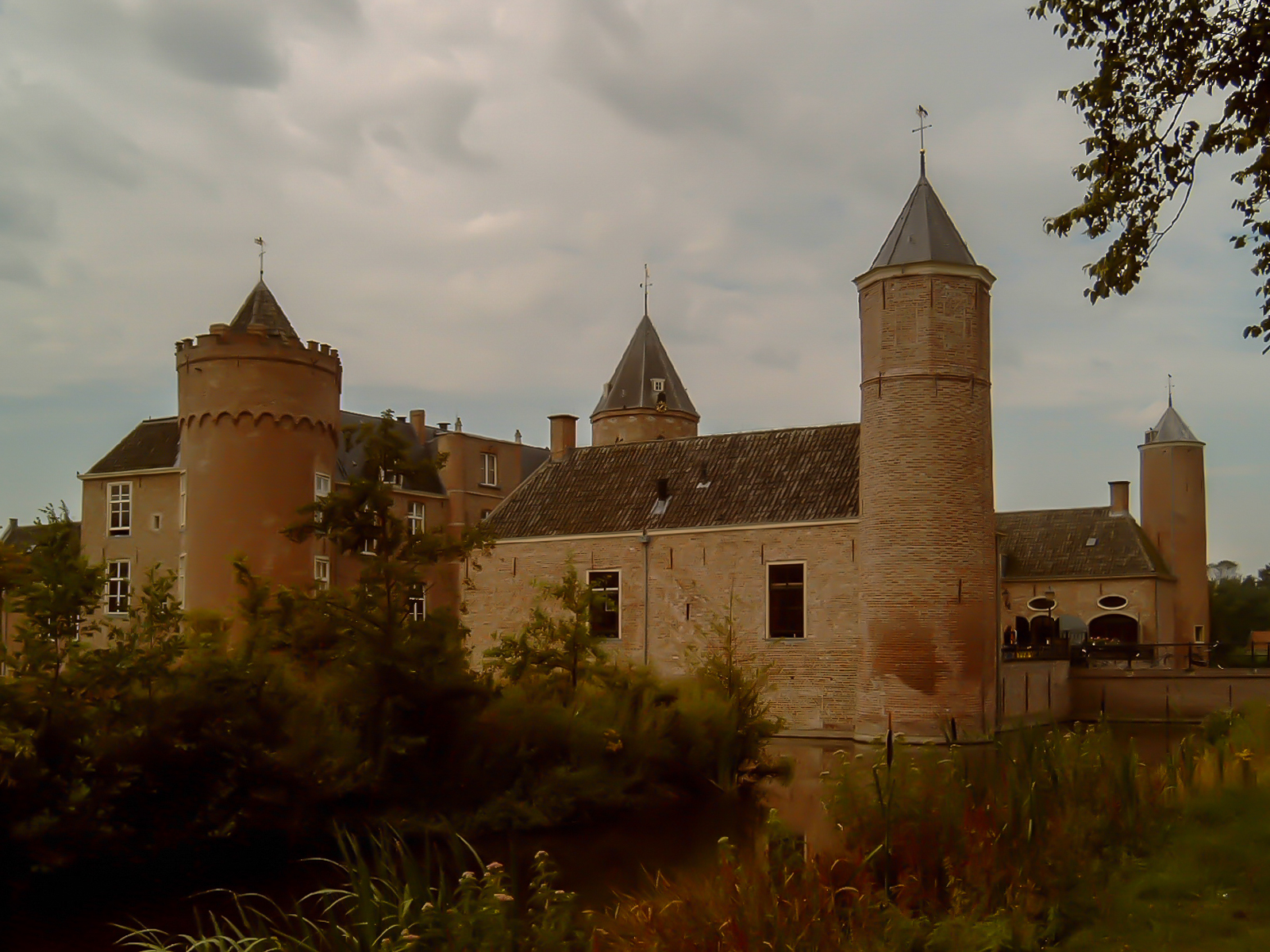
Domburg, castle/youth hostel

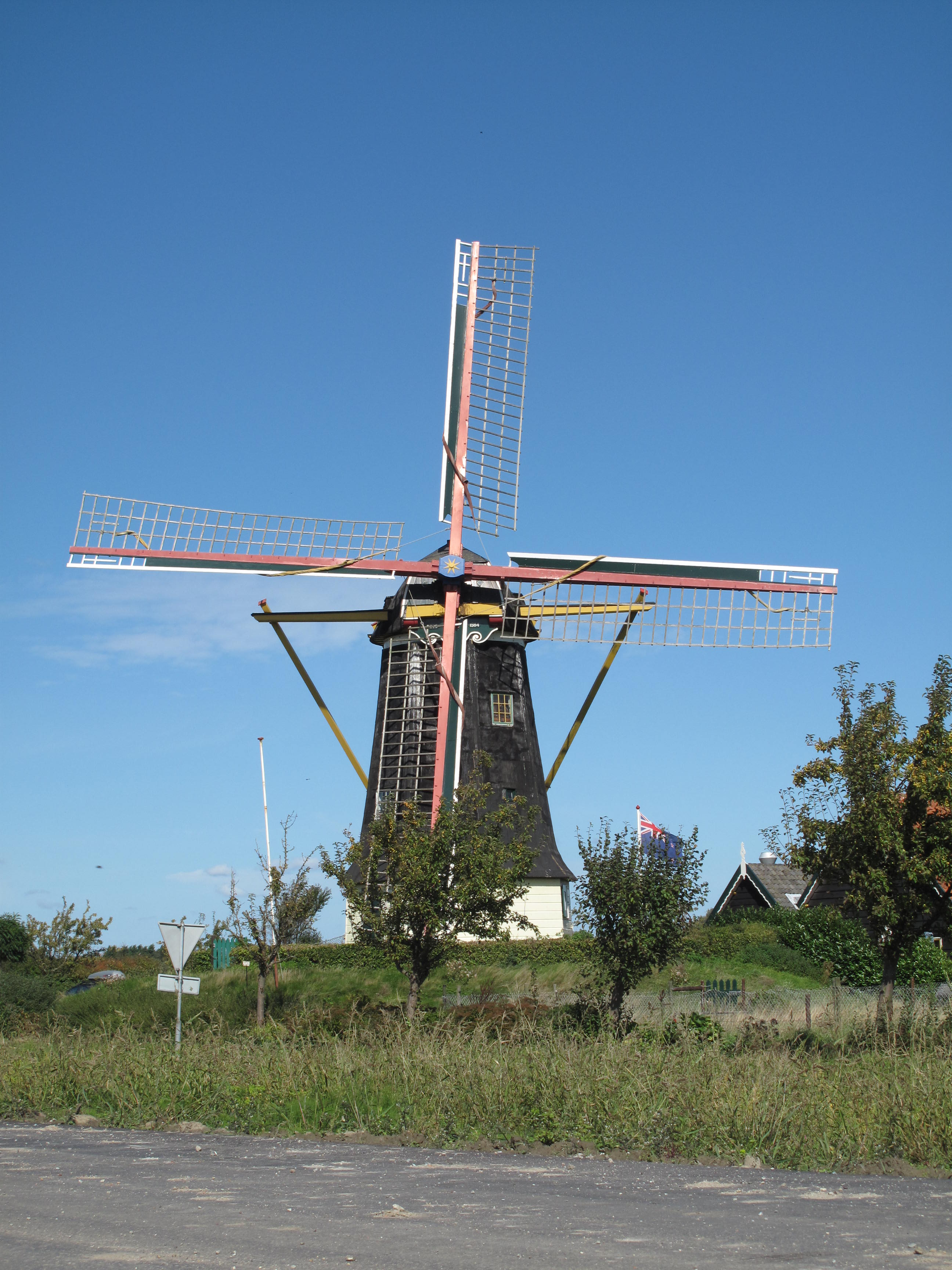
Serooskerke, windmill

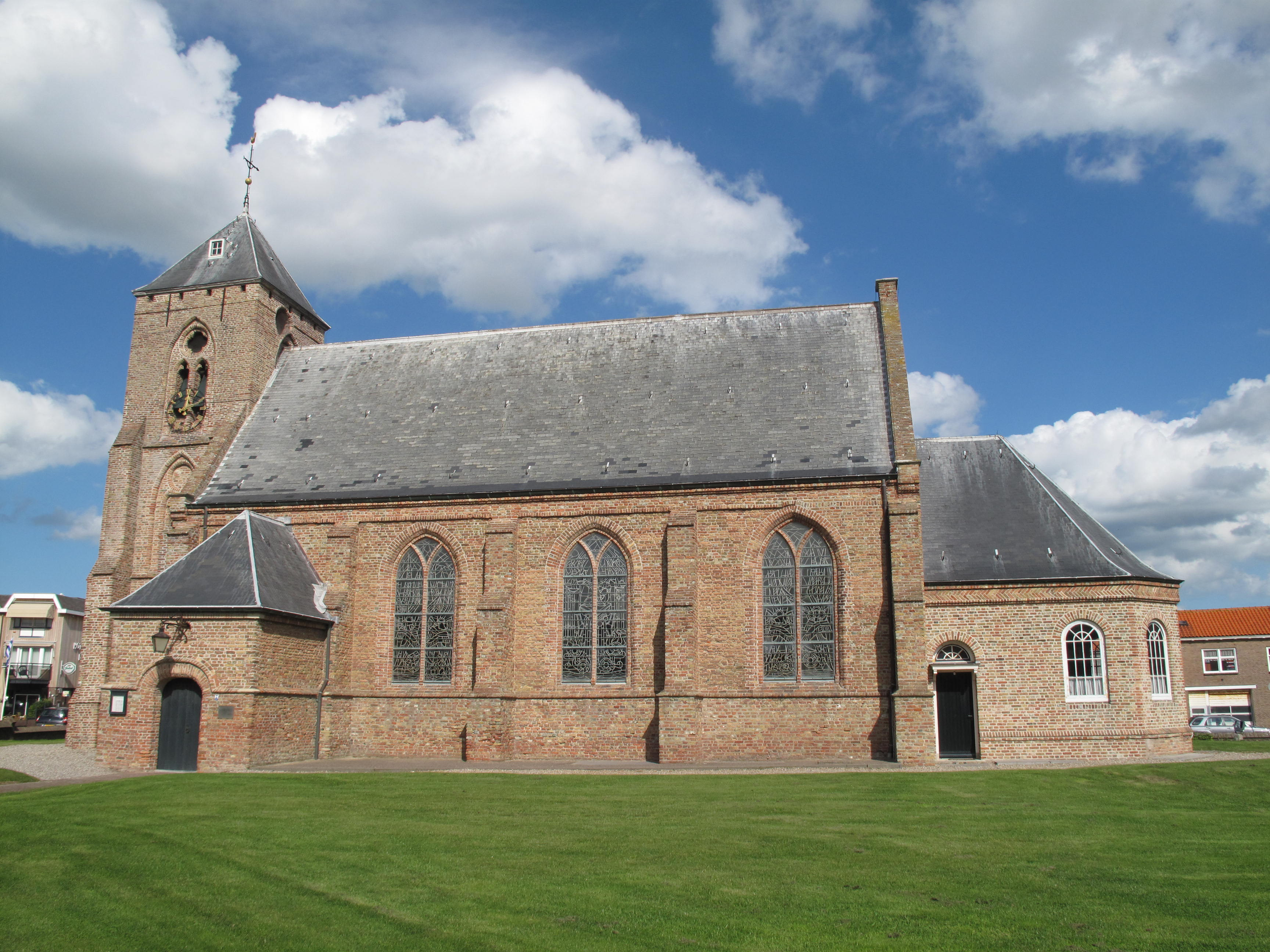
Zoutelande, church
