= HNLMS Stoomloodsvaartuig no. 14 =

History

Netherlands
- Name: Stoomloodsvaartuig no. 14
- Operator: Royal Netherlands Navy
- Builder: P. Smit Jr., Netherlands
- Launched: 1915
- Commissioned: 1917
- Fate: Hit a British mine on 15 February 1918 near Westkapelle and sank

General characteristics
- Type: Pilot boat; Auxiliary minelayer
- Displacement: 460 t (450 long tons)
- Length: 42.3 m (138 ft 9 in)
- Beam: 7.3 m (23 ft 11 in)
- Draught: 4.55 m (14 ft 11 in)
- Propulsion: 525 ihp (391 kW); triple-expansion steam engine; coal-fired boiler
- Speed: 11 knots (20 km/h; 13 mph)

HNLMS Stoomloodsvaartuig no. 14 was a pilot vessel built in the Netherlands originally for the Loodswezen. In 1917 she was militarized and put into service of the Royal Netherlands Navy as an auxiliary minelayer. The following year, on 15 February 1918, she sunk after hitting a British mine near Westkapelle.

== Design and construction ==
Stoomloodsvaartuig no. 14 was built between 1915 and 1917 for the Loodswezen at the shipyard of P. Smit Jr. in the Netherlands. She had a steel hull and a displacement of 460 tons. When it came to measurements, Stoomloodsvaartuig no. 14 had a length of 42.3 metres (138 ft 9 in), a beam of 7.3 metres (23 ft 11 in) and a draught of 4.55 metres (14 ft 11 in). Furthermore, she was equipped with a triple-expansion steam engine and a coal-fired boiler that could produce 391 kilowatts (525 ihp). This allowed her to reach a maximum speed of 11 knots (20 km/h; 13 mph).

== Service history ==
In 1917 Stoomloodsvaartuig no. 14 was militarized and put into service of the Royal Netherlands Navy (RNLN), as a result of the Dutch mobilization during the First World War. During her service in the RNLN she served as auxiliary minelayer and was stationed at Vlissingen. In her role as a minelayer Stoomloodsvaartuig no. 14 replenished and inspected naval mine barriers that were deployed for the purpose of maintaining Dutch neutrality. Her callsign at the time was GRSU.

While being part of the investigative service (Dutch: Onderzoekingsdienst) in the Southern frontier Stoomloodsvaartuig no. 14 hit a British mine on 15 February 1918 near Westkapelle. At the time she was searching for a mine that the fishing vessel Arnemuiden 16 had caught earlier that day in her fishing net. While searching for the mine, which she did together with the fishing vessel, they hit a mine and both ships blew up and sank. A total of eight persons lost their lives, of which five were part of the crew of Stoomloodsvaartuig no. 14.

After Stoomloodsvaartuig no. 14 blew up and sank an investigation was launched. This led to several mines being found and either recovered or detonated. The recovered mines indicated that they were of British origin. After formal complaints, the British government admitted that the mines were theirs and provided compensation for the ship and victims. The mines were located 3 nautical miles outside a location announced in 1916, which the British government attributed to a navigation error.

The shipwreck of Stoomloodsvaartuig no. 14 is protected by law.

== Citations ==
=== Bibliography ===
- van Dam, C. (1943). "Van zeilloodsvaartuigen tot motorloodsvaartuigen". Schip en Werf (in Dutch). Vol. 10, no. 13. Rotterdam: N.V. Dukkerij Wyt & Zonen.
- Roetering, B., ed. (1997). Mijnendienst 1907-1997 90 jaar: feiten, verhalen en anekdotes uit het negentigjarig bestaan van de Mijnendienst van de Koninklijke Marine (in Dutch). ISBN 90-90-10528-X.
