= Mary Gabrielse =

Dutch artist and champion swimmer (born 1923)

- Born: Mary Margaret Gabrielse; 1923; Tjimahi, Dutch East Indies
- Died: December 14, 2018
- Other name: Mary Margaret Terhorst-Gabrielse
- Occupations: Illustrator, swimmer
- Known for: Illustrations of life in Japanese internment camps during World War II
- Spouse: Theo Terhorst
- Relatives: Johannes Gabrielse (uncle)

Mary Margaret Gabrielse (1923-2018) was a Dutch illustrator and former champion swimmer.

== Life and career ==
Mary Margaret Gabrielse was born in Tjimahi, and is the niece of Johannes Gabrielse.

Just before World War II she was a champion swimmer holding several Dutch East Indies swim records as well as Asian swimming records.

After the war she became an artist having studied art at school. She also was an artist and interned in the Japanese camps of World War II. She survived as did a number of her colour illustrations reflecting camp life in the women's camp and now at the museum Museon.

Her other works produced after the war are held in private collections. Her artistic output was limited by family responsibilities, but she frequently illustrated letters sent to her extensive network of correspondents, resulting in her artwork being distributed among numerous recipients.
