= Frederiek Schouwenaar =

Dutch police officer, VVD-politician and official

Mayor of Veere
- Incumbent
- Assumed office 1 February 2023
- Preceded by: Rob van der Zwaag

Personal details
- Born: Frederiek Justine van Doesburg-Schouwenaar; 1980 (age 45–46) Hoorn
- Party: VVD
- Parent: Koos Schouwenaar (burgemeester) (father)
- Education: Utrecht University, Dutch Police Academy
- Occupation: Politician · civil servant · Police officer

Frederiek Justine van Doesburg-Schouwenaar (Hoorn, 1980) is a Dutch police officer, VVD-politician and official. She has been the mayor of Veere since 1 February 2023.

Political offices
Preceded by Rob van der Zwaag	Mayor of Veere; 2023 -	Succeeded by -
