= Johannes Gabrielse =

Dutch artist

Johannes Gabrielse (1881, Westkapelle – 16 June 1945, Ambarawa) was a Dutch artist born in Zeeland, who died in a Japanese internment camp in the Dutch East Indies.

He taught his daughter Corrie Gabriëlse. He was also the uncle of Mary Gabrielse, also an artist.

Gabriëlse studied at the National School for Teachers (1898–1901) and the Rijksakademie (1901–1902) in Amsterdam.

Well known for his illustrations of Indonesia for Dutch school books as well as wall prints (School platen) published by the publishers Wolters from Groningen. He also is remembered for his sketches of life in the Japanese camps during World War II. Some of his work is kept at the Dutch museum Museon in The Hague.

He illustrated textbooks, including From Mother to child language and New language in the Dutch East Indies. He also made many oil paintings and he was book cover designer.

He was however more than just a school illustrator and produced a number of paintings in oil. He sketched extensively, with his sketches being produced in a book form just before the war.

== Some works ==
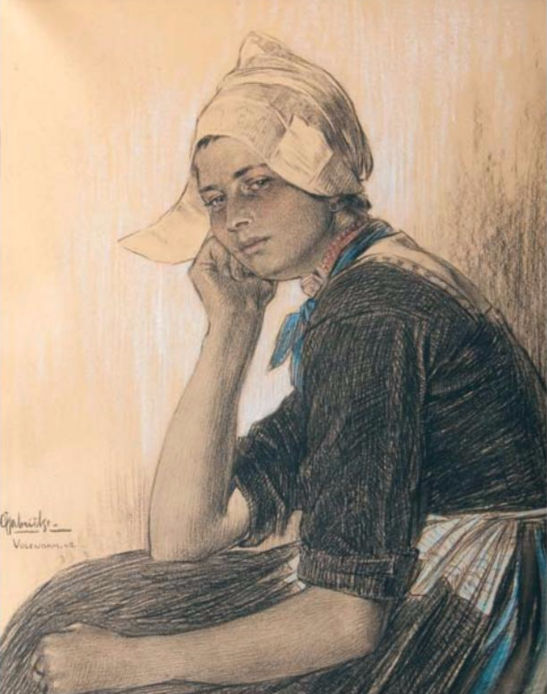
Hille Butter (1903)

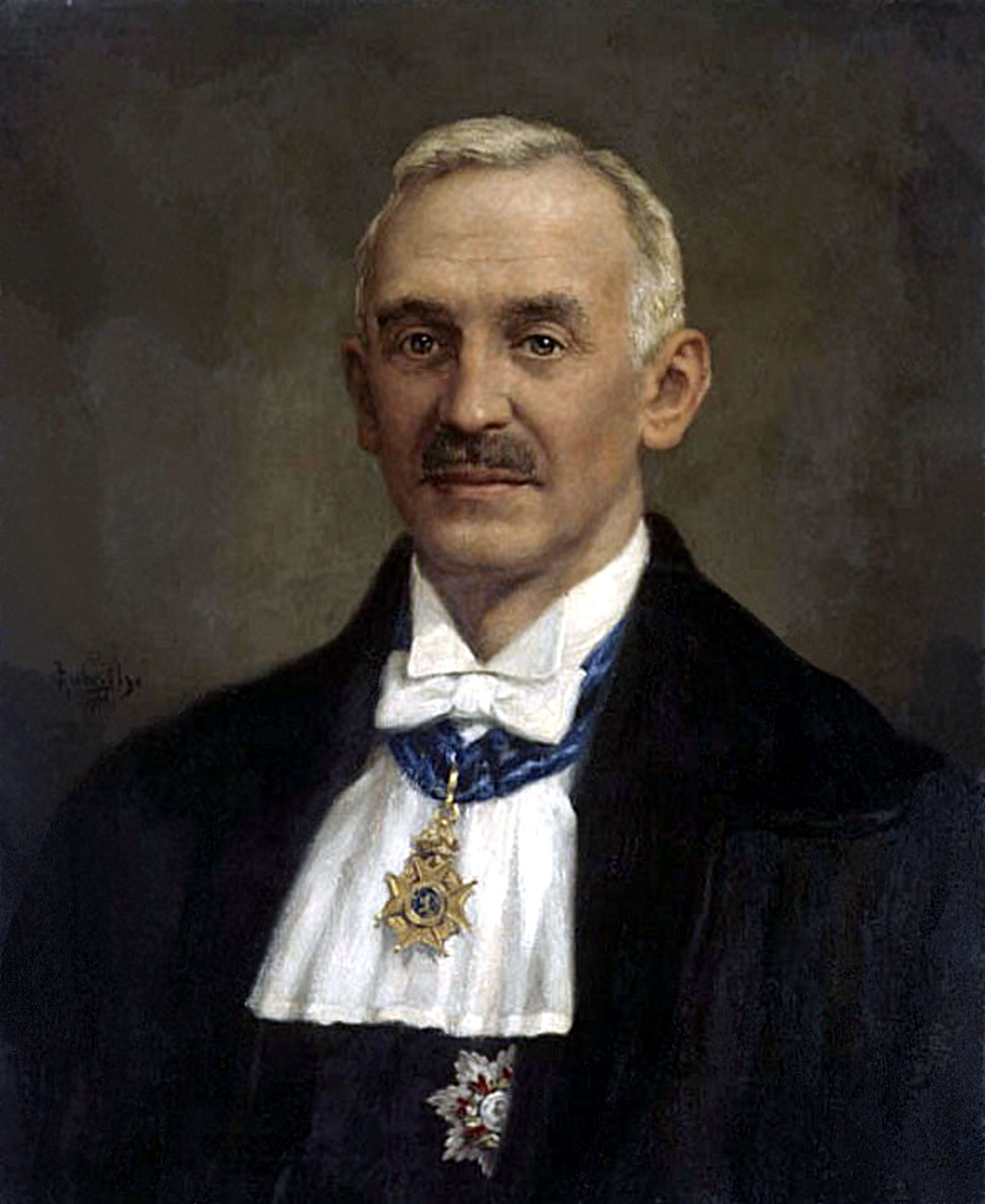
Hugo Kruyt (1933)

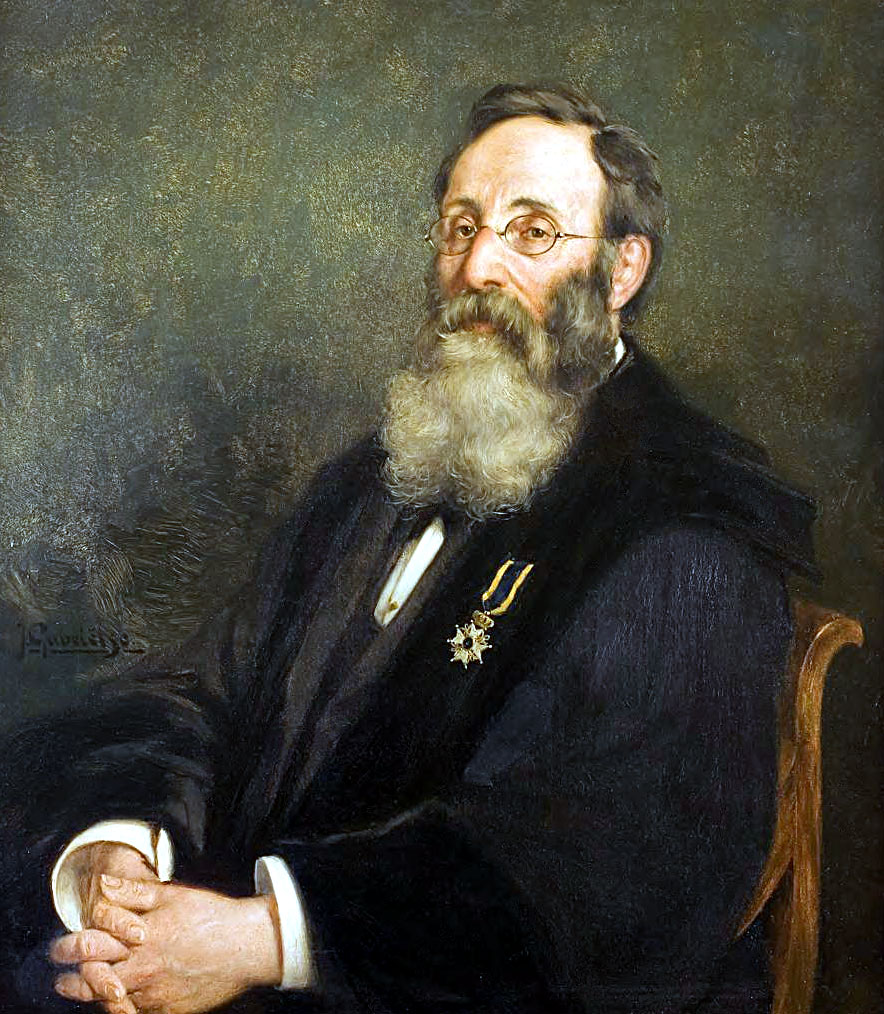
Leids hoogleraar Jan van Leeuwen (1905)

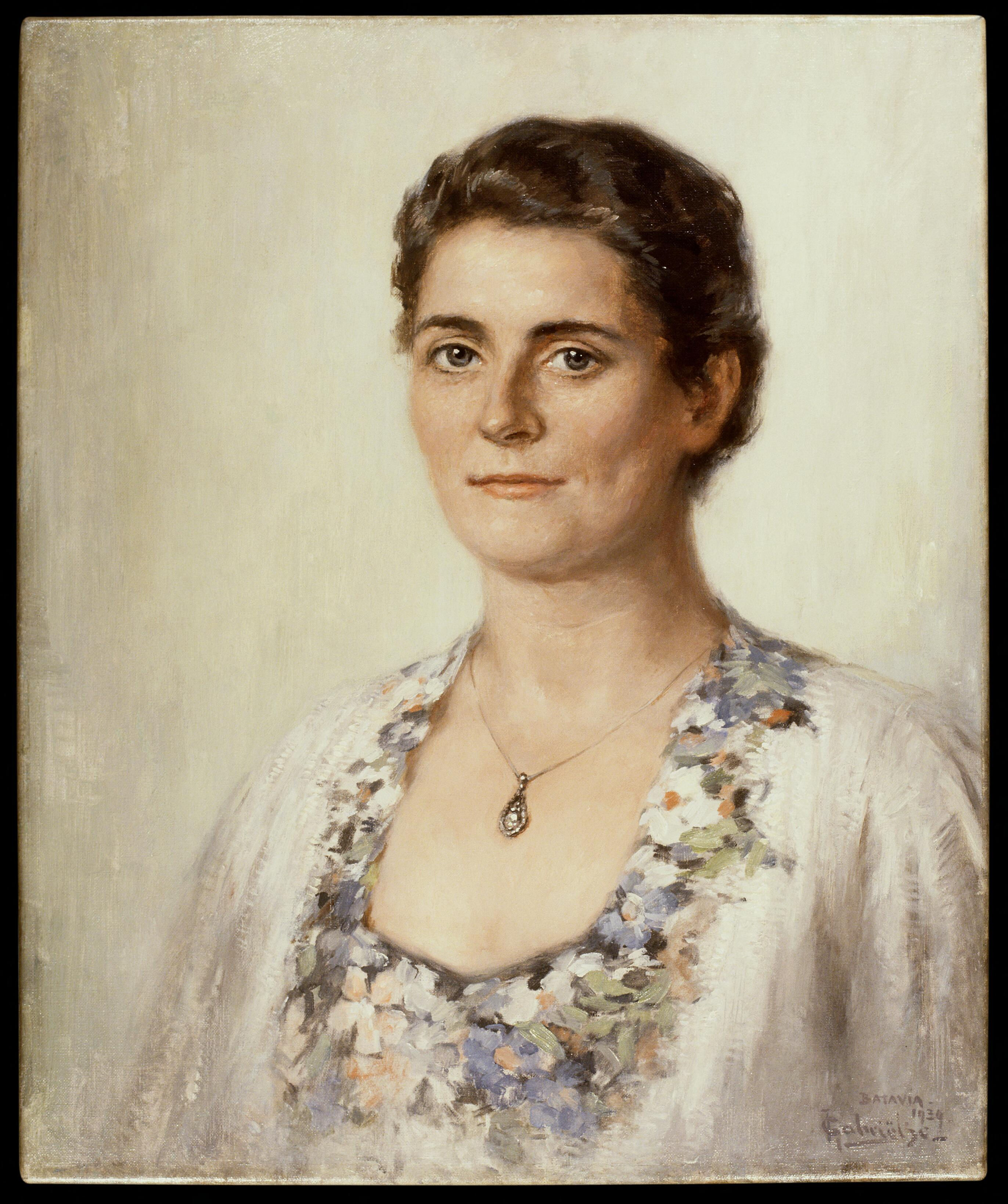
Maria Suzanna Willinge-Sligcher (1939)

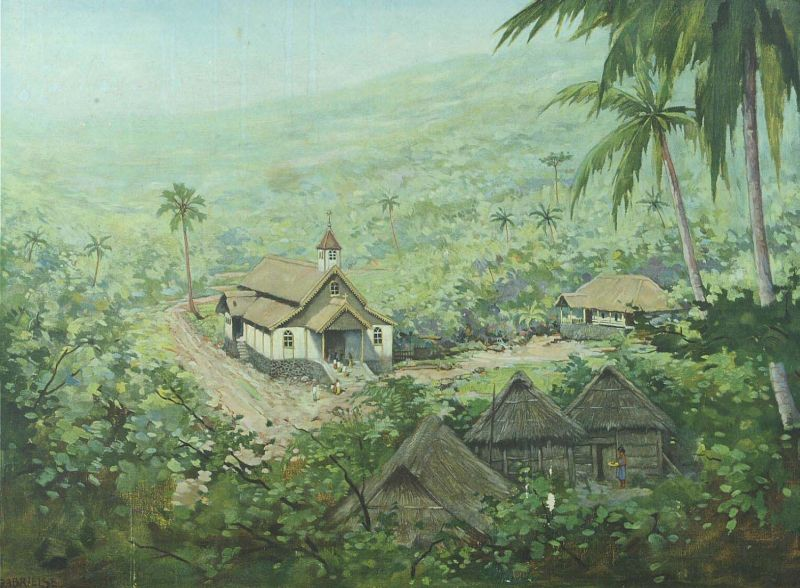
Church Lomblen. Lithograph after a painting by Gabriëlse
