= Aert H. Kuipers =

Dutch linguist

- Born: 10 November 1919; Oostkapelle or Middelburg, Netherlands
- Died: 1 December 2012 (aged 93); Netherlands
- Occupation: Linguist

Academic background
- Education: Columbia University
- Thesis: A contribution to the analysis of the Qabardian language (1951)

Academic work
- Institutions: Leiden University
- Main interests: Northwest Caucasian languages, Salishan languages

Aert Hendrik Kuipers (10 November 1919, Oostkapelle or Middelburg – 1 December 2012) was a Dutch linguist who, from his pioneering fieldwork among First Nations people of British Columbia during the 1950s, compiled the first detailed reference grammars of Squamish and Shuswap, two almost extinct Salishan languages. He also advised Jan van Eijk in his work on Lillooet and Hank Nater in his work on Nuxalk and did important work on comparative Salishan.

After obtaining his PhD at Columbia University in 1951 with the study A contribution to the analysis of the Qabardian language, Kuipers was on the faculty of the University of British Columbia from 1951 to 1954. During those years, as well as in the course of a 1956 field trip, he collected extensive material on the Squamish language. From 1960 to 1983, he taught linguistics at Leiden University. After 1971, he was a professor in the department of Slavic languages and culture, specializing in Caucasian languages.

Kuipers had a strong commitment to helping to preserve a record of threatened and endangered languages. As a 1998 article in The Economist put it, "Aert Kuipers ... went to Canada recently with the intention of locating and preserving American Indian languages. He came across dozens, some limited to a single valley, others spoken by only a few dozen people. He settled on one, learnt it and put together a dictionary and a primer. But by the time he had finished there was only one other speaker of the language left." Kuipers responded to this in a letter that his arrival in Canada (nearly half a century earlier) was hardly "recently" and that The Economist may have conflated Squamish and Shuswap with regard to the "one speaker left" statement.

== Works ==
=== As co-editor ===
- 1956: Bernard Geiger, Aert Kuipers, Tibor Halasi-Kun, and Karl H. Menges (eds.). The Caucasus (2 volumes). Human Relations Area File. New York: Columbia University, Language and Communication Research Center.
- 1959: Bernard Geiger, Aert H. Kuipers, Tibor Halasi-Kun, and Karl H. Menges (eds.). Peoples and Languages of the Caucasus: A synopsis. The Hague: Mouton & Co., 78pp. Accessed 30 July 2013. (This is a 17.3 MB PDF file which provides a brief index to the various Caucasian languages treated in detail in the 1956 work.)
- 1989: Aert H. Kuipers, Gabrielle Rainich (eds.). Russian-English Vocabulary with Grammatical Sketch. American Mathematical Society, 66pp. ISBN 082180037X (This book is intended to help non-Russian-speakers to understand Russian-language mathematical texts.)

=== As author ===
- 1960: Phoneme and Morpheme in Kabardian (Eastern Adyghe). The Hague: Mouton & Co., 124pp.
- 1967: The Squamish Language: Grammar, Texts, Dictionary. The Hague: Mouton & Co., 407pp. (This work received a generally favourable review by Laurence C. Thompson in American Anthropologist, [71, 1969] pp. 138–139.)
- 1974: The Shuswap Language: Grammar, Texts, Dictionary. The Hague: Mouton & Co., 297pp.
- 1975: A classified English-Shuswap word-list. Peter de Ridder Press, 35pp. ISBN 9031600830
- 1975: A Dictionary of Proto-Circassian Roots. John Benjamins Pub. Co., 93pp. ISBN 0685533158
- 1976: Typologically Salient Features of Some North-West Caucasian Languages. Peter de Ridder Press, 29pp. ISBN 9031601063
- 1989: A Report on Shuswap with a Squamish Lexical Appendix. Peeters, 250pp. ISBN 9068311921
- 2002: Salish Etymological Dictionary. Missoula, Montana: Univ. Montana., Linguistics Laboratory, 240pp. ISBN 1-879763-16-8

== Sources ==
- De leden van de Koninklijke Nederlandse Akademie van Wetenschappen. Een demografisch perspectief: 1808 tot 2008, Deel/Blz.: 304, annex I
- Album Scholasticum academiae Lugduno-Batavae MCMLXXV-MCMLXXXIX (1975-1989).
