= Serooskerke, Walcheren =

Serooskerke
- Village
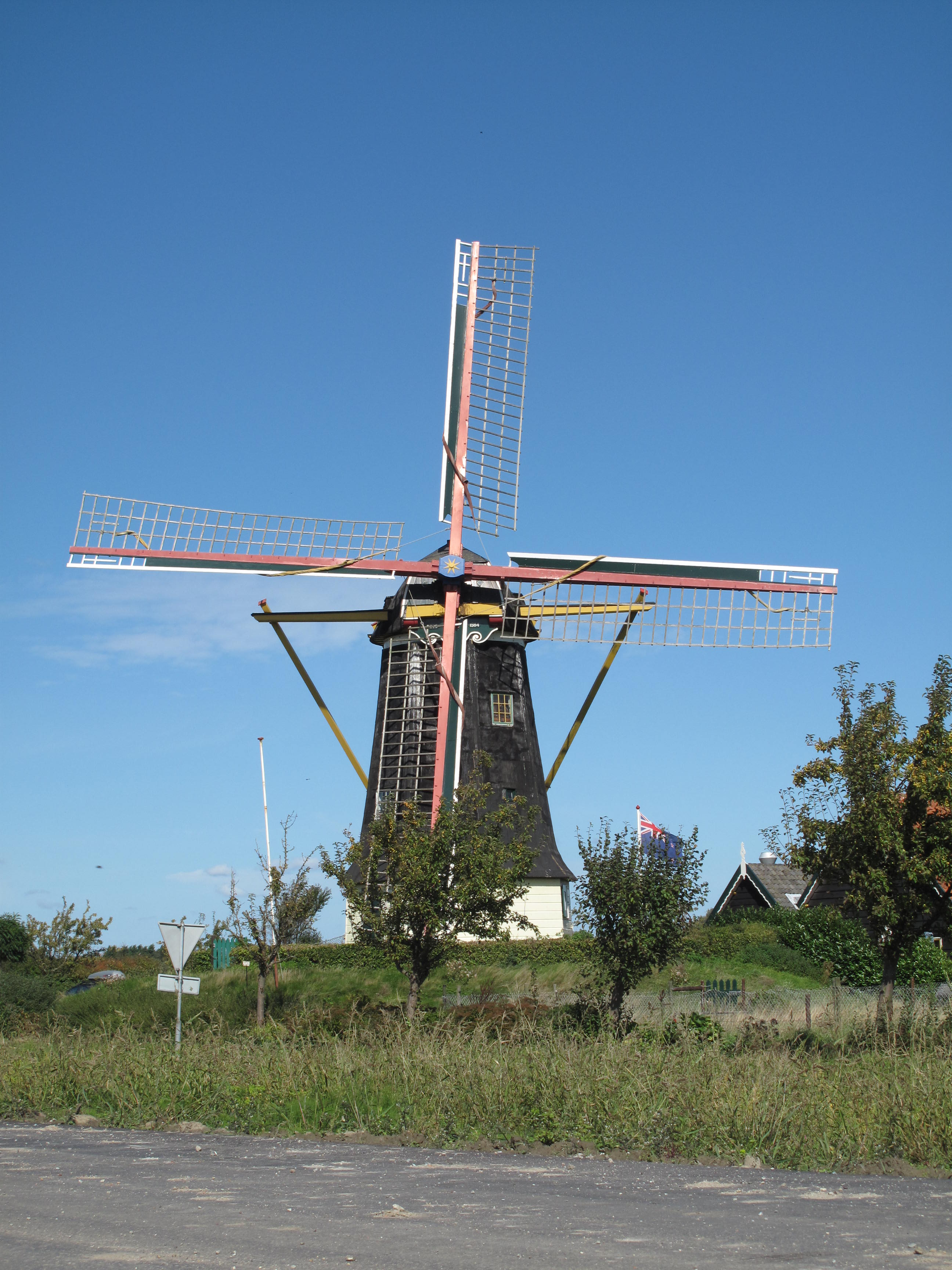
- Windmill De Jonge Johannes, Serooskerke

- Flag Coat of arms

- Location in the province of Zeeland in the Netherlands Serooskerke (Netherlands)
- Coordinates: 51°32′55″N 3°35′43″E
- Country: Netherlands
- Province: Zeeland
- Municipality: Veere

Area
  - Total: 9.03 km^{2} (3.49 sq mi)
- Elevation: 1.3 m (4.3 ft)

Population (2021)
  - Total: 1,825
  - Density: 202/km^{2} (523/sq mi)
- Time zone: UTC+1 (CET)
  - Summer (DST): UTC+2 (CEST)
- Postal code: 4353
- Dialing code: 0118

Serooskerke is a village in the Dutch province of Zeeland. It is a part of the municipality of Veere, and lies about 6 km north of Middelburg.

== History ==
The village was first mentioned before 1207 as Alerdeskirkam, and means "(private) church of Alard (person)". Serooskerke is a circular church village which developed in the 12th century on a ridge. Monastery Mariëndaal was built south of the village in the 13th century. It was destroyed in 1574.

The Dutch Reformed church is a single aisled church with a wide tower. The tower dates from the 15th century. The church was destroyed between 1572 and 1574 and later rebuilt.

Serooskerke was home to 892 people in 1840. It was a separate municipality until 1966, when it was merged with Veere.

In 1966, a farm worker was digging the field near the fire station and discovered a golden coin. Almost 1,100 golden coins from the late 16th and early 17th century were discovered. The municipality was entitled to half the proceeds and built a swimming pool from the money.

== Gallery ==
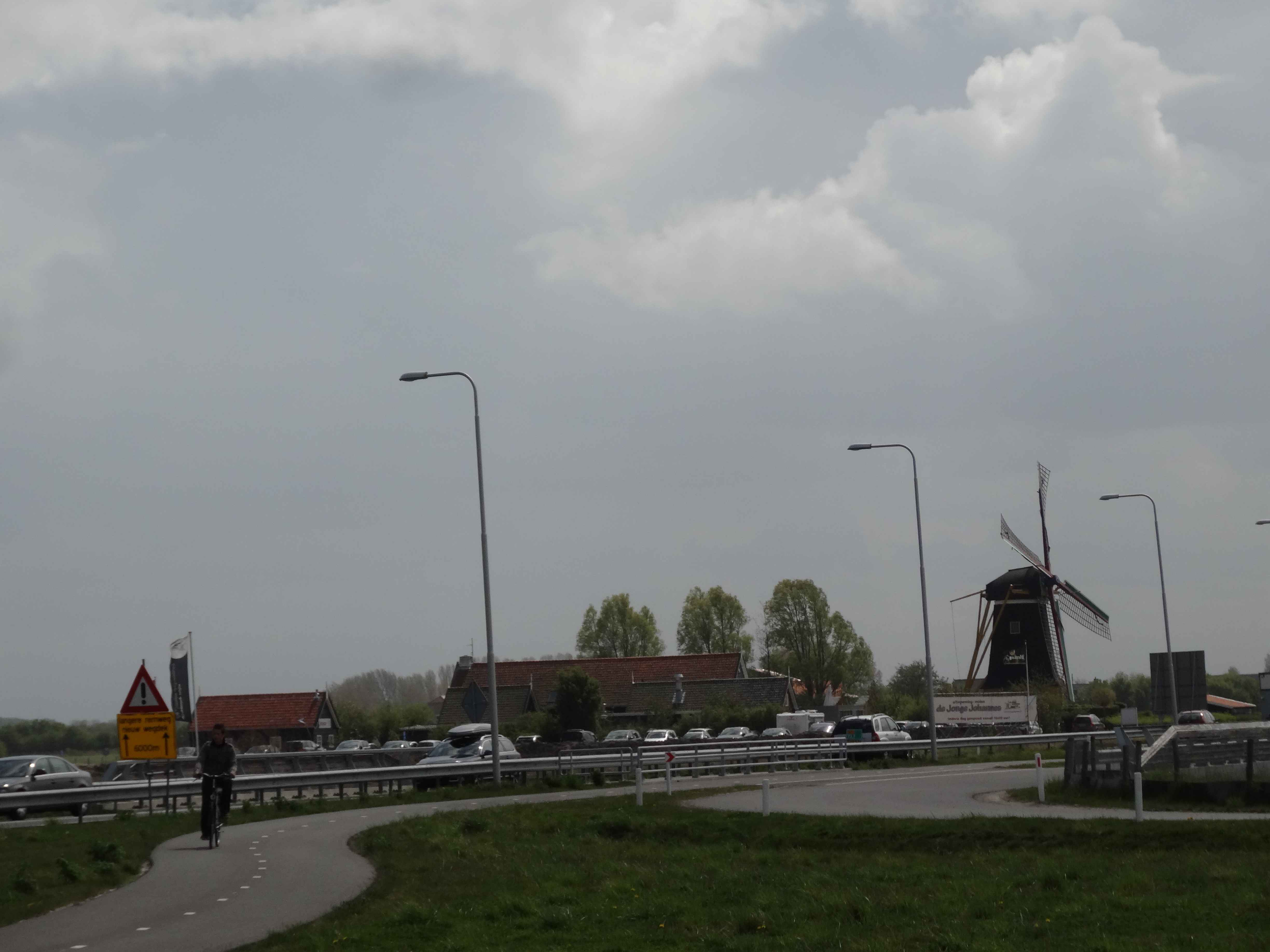
View on Serooskerke

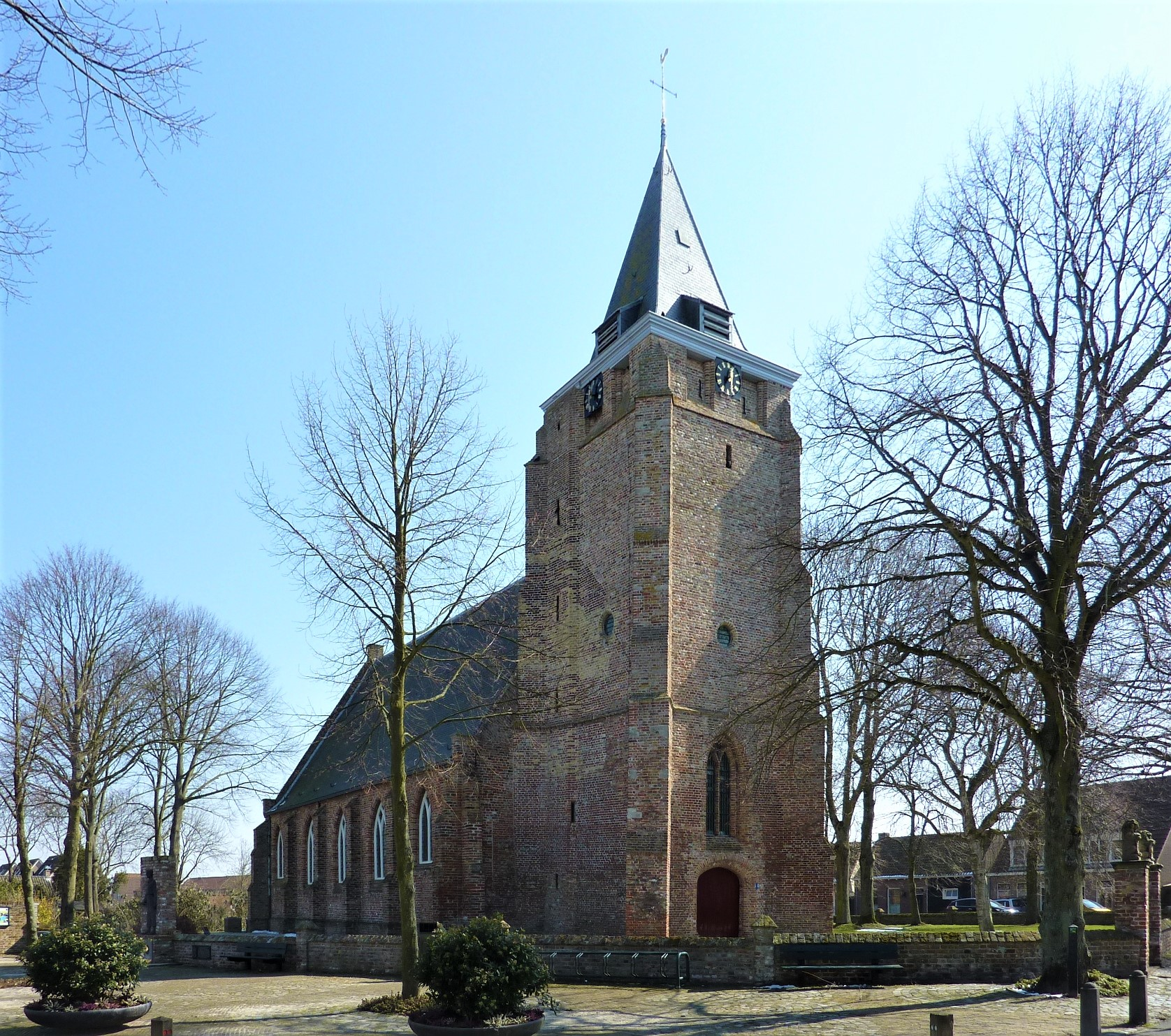
Johanneskerk
