= Peter de Ru =

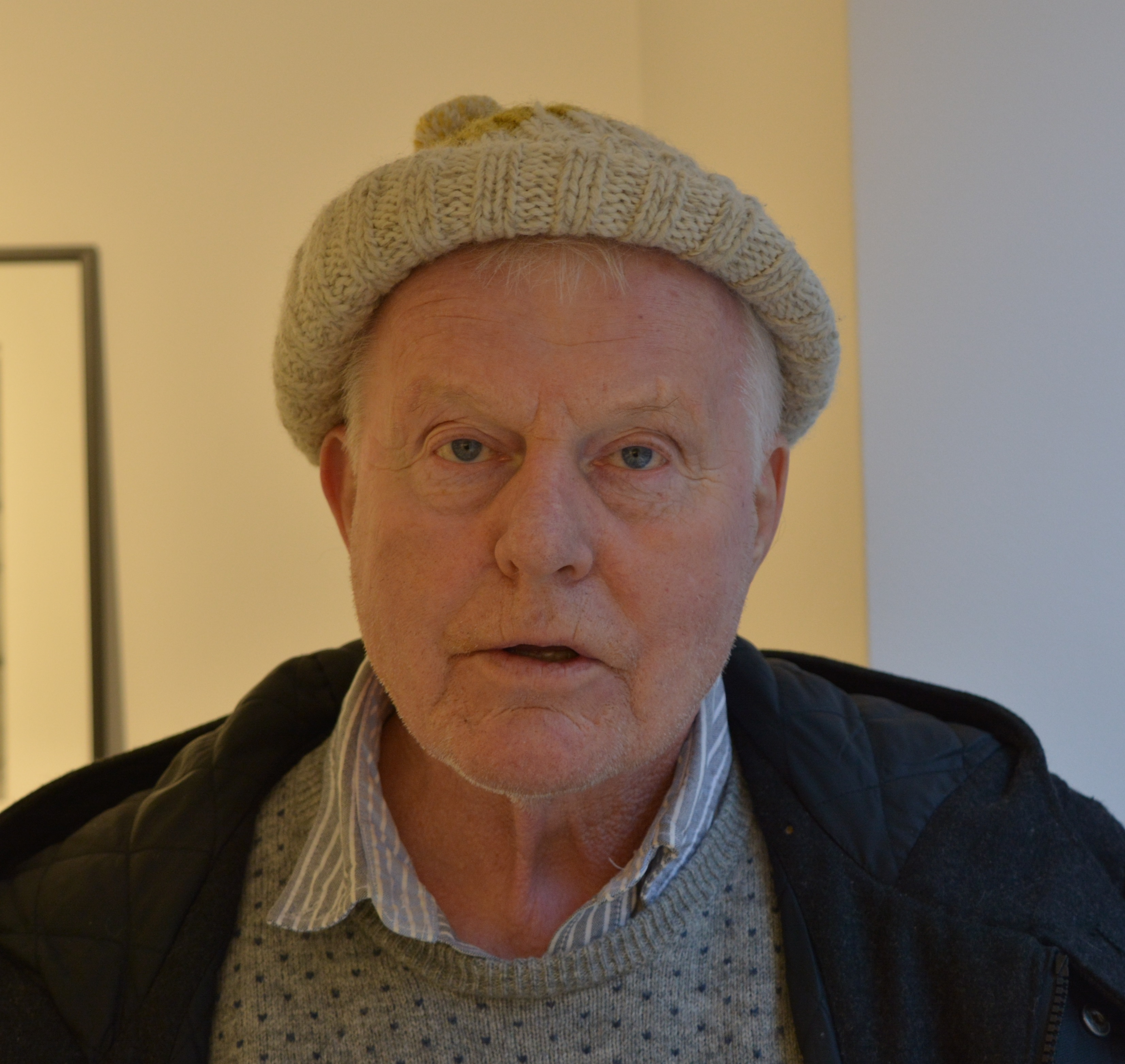
Peter de Ru

Peter de Ru is a photographer born 1946 in Oostkapelle in The Netherlands. In 1969 he moved to Sweden. After language studies at the University of Gothenburg he moved to Stockholm and entered the renowned Fotoskolan (Photo School) under Christer Strömholm where he studied 1971 to 1974. He is married to the Swedish artist Susann Wallander. Peter de Ru is represented at several state institutions like the Swedish Radio, the Nobel Museum, the Karolinska Hospital, and since 2011 at the National Museum in Stockholm (the Swedish State portrait gallery at Gripsholm).

== Books ==
- Vi Ses Atlantic Alicia, 1980, ISBN 9185246441
- Karolinska Sjukhuset, 2003, ISBN 9789163020469
- Sven, 2008, ISBN 9197696625
