= Oostkapelle =

- Village
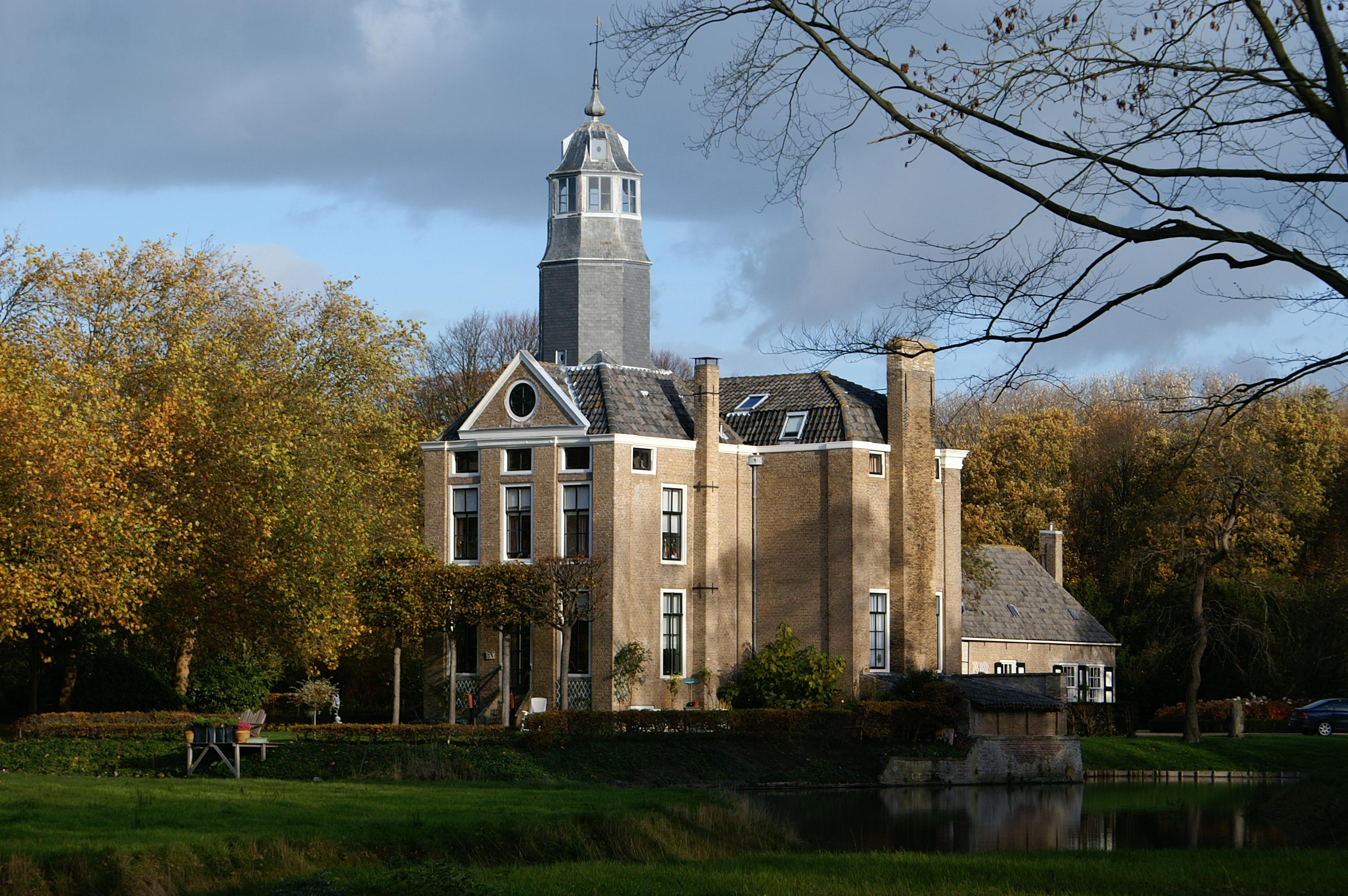
- Duinbeek Castle

- Flag Coat of arms

- Location in the province of Zeeland in the Netherlands Oostkapelle (Netherlands)
- Coordinates: 51°34′0″N 3°33′3″E
- Country: Netherlands
- Province: Zeeland
- Municipality: Veere

Area
  - Total: 15.97 km^{2} (6.17 sq mi)
- Elevation: 1.0 m (3.3 ft)

Population (2021)
  - Total: 2,325
  - Density: 145.6/km^{2} (377.1/sq mi)
- Time zone: UTC+1 (CET)
  - Summer (DST): UTC+2 (CEST)
- Postal code: 4356
- Dialing code: 0118

Oostkapelle is a village in the Dutch province of Zeeland. It is a part of the municipality of Veere, and lies about 9 km north of Middelburg. Oostkapelle was a separate municipality until 1966, when it was merged with Domburg.

== History ==
The village was first mentioned in 1162 as tHoostcapelle, and means "eastern chapel". Oost (east) has been added to distinguish from Westkapelle. Oostkapelle developed as a circular church village in the Early Middle Ages on a ridge. Westhove Castle was built to the west of the village in 1277 and was owned by the Middelburg Abbey.

The Dutch Reformed church is a single aisled church with an attached consistory. The large tower was constructed in the late-15th century. The nave was destroyed in 1572 and rebuilt in 1585. In 1610, the medieval remainder was demolished and rebuilt. The church was restored between 1954 and 1958.

Westenhove Castle was built in 1277. In 1572, the castle was destroyed except for two corner towers and the centre tower. In the mid-17th century, the middle wing was rebuilt. The left wings was added in 1770. In 1889, it was used as children's sanatorium. The castle was restored in 1977, and is used as a youth hostel since 1989.

Oostkapelle was home to 818 people in 1840. In the 20th century, Oostkapelle started to develop as a holiday resort and spa town, due to its vicinity to the dunes and the North Sea.

== Gallery ==
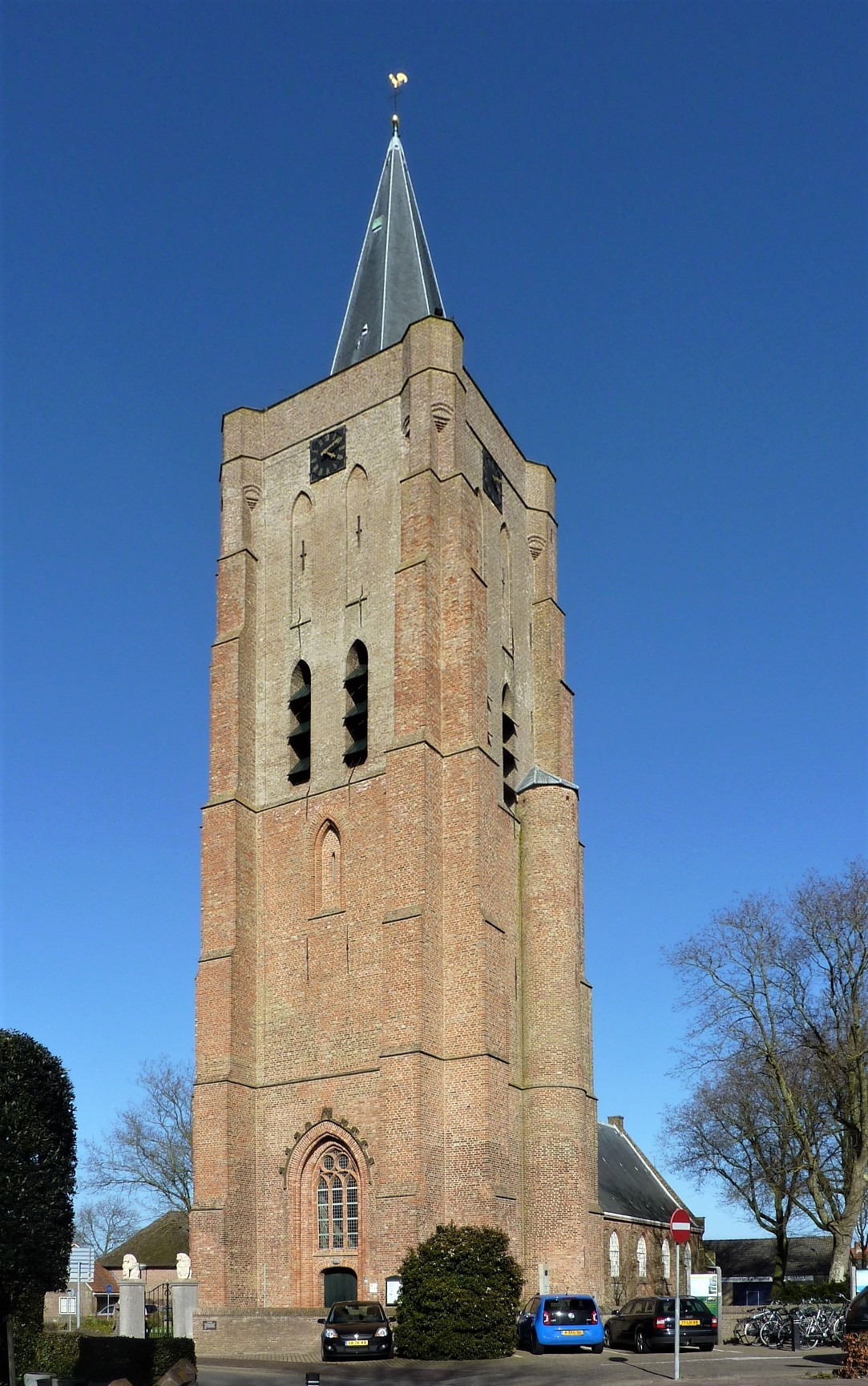
Tower of the Protestant parish church

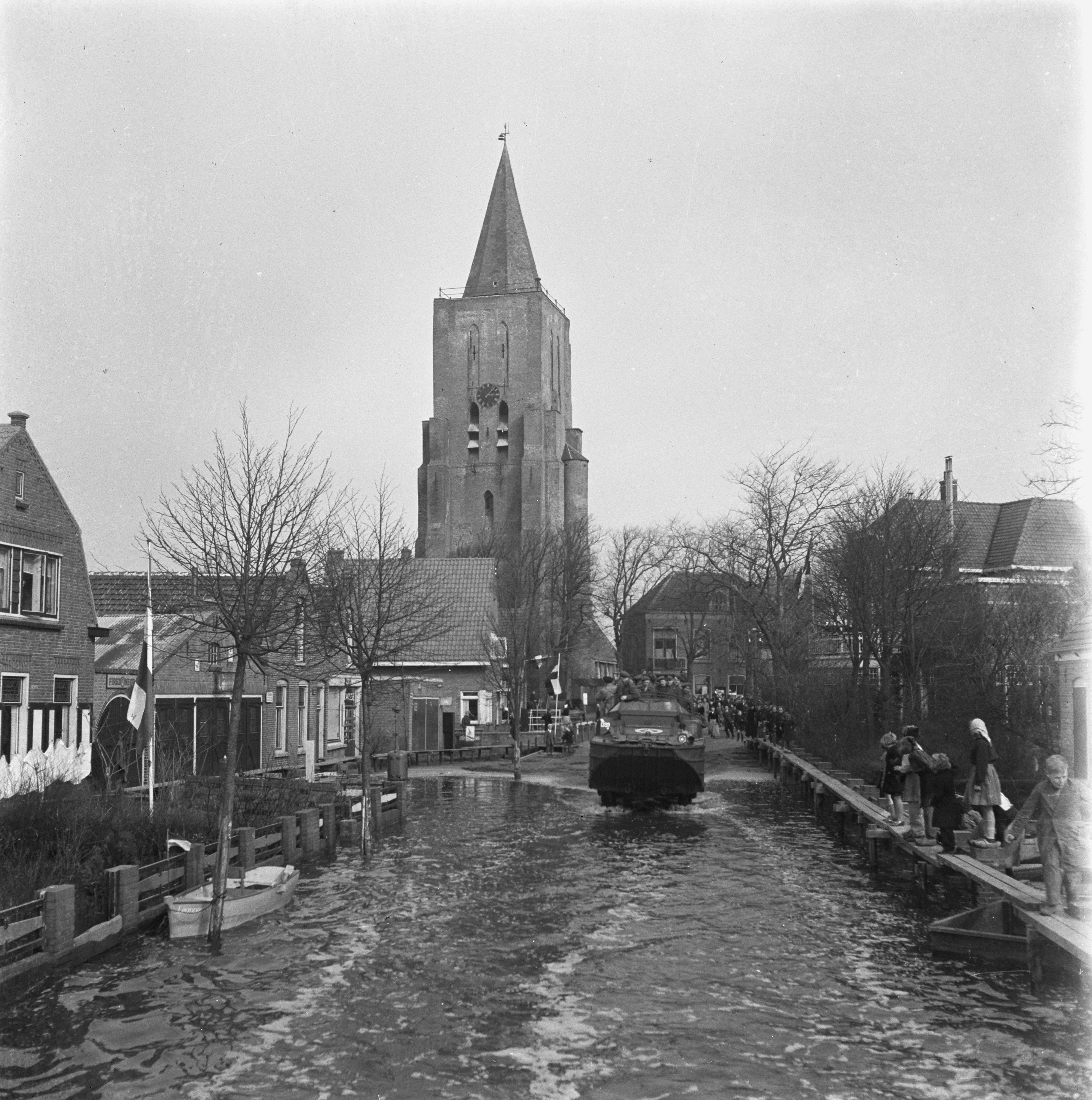
Queen Wilhelmina visits the inundated Oostkapelle (March 1945)

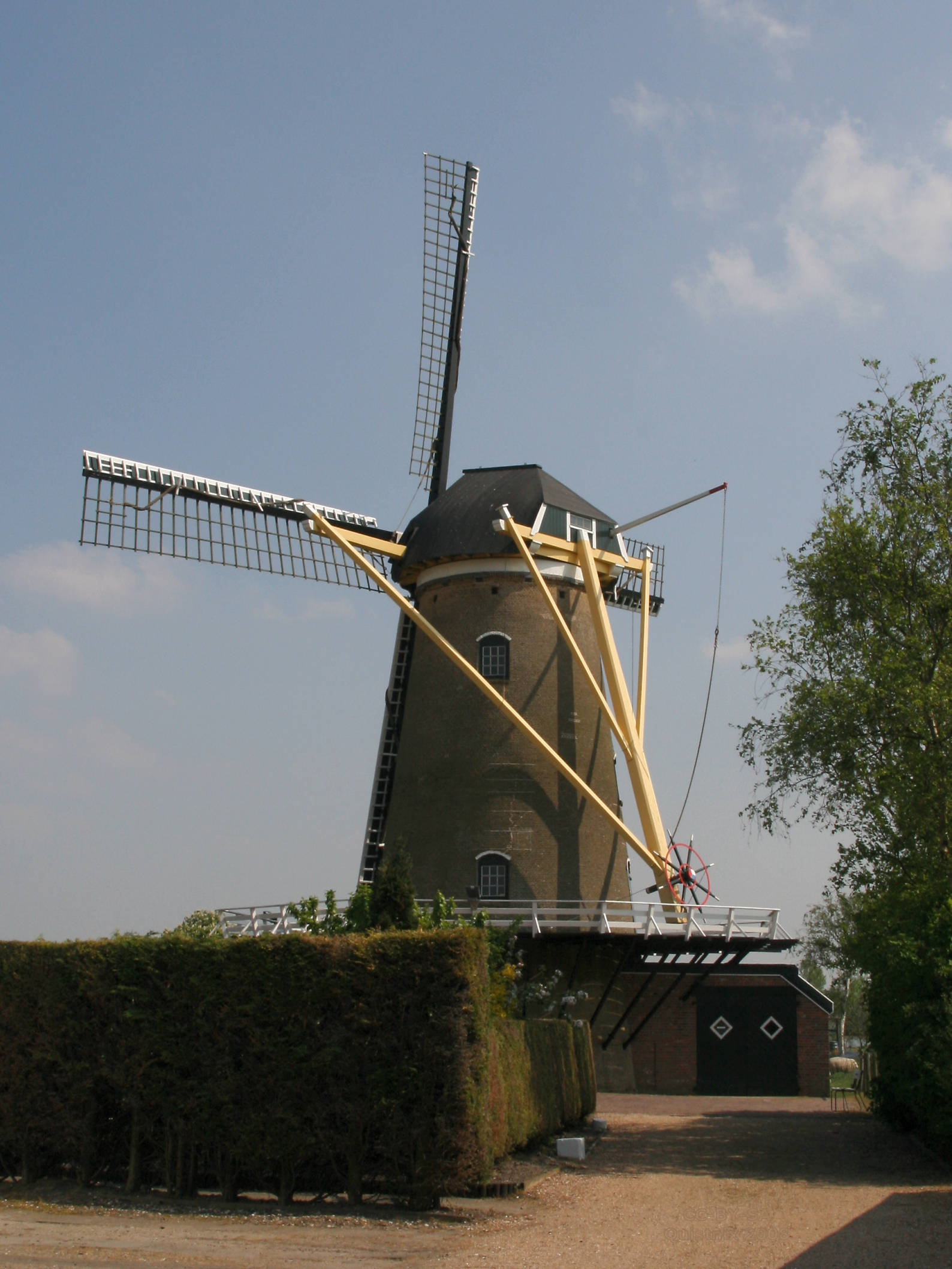
Wind mill d'Arke

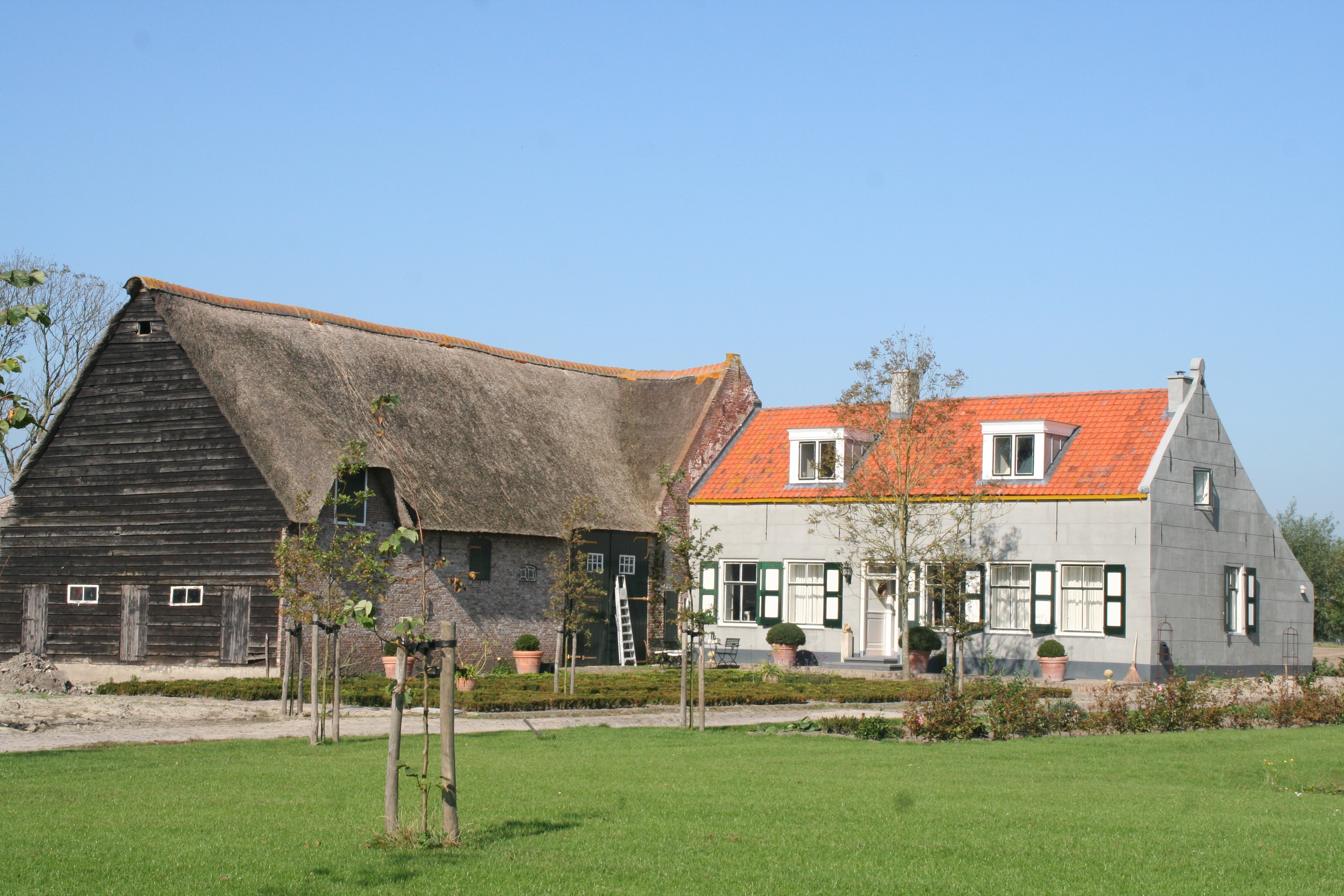
Farm Cranestein
