= Westkapelle, Netherlands =

Westkapelle Wasschappel
- City
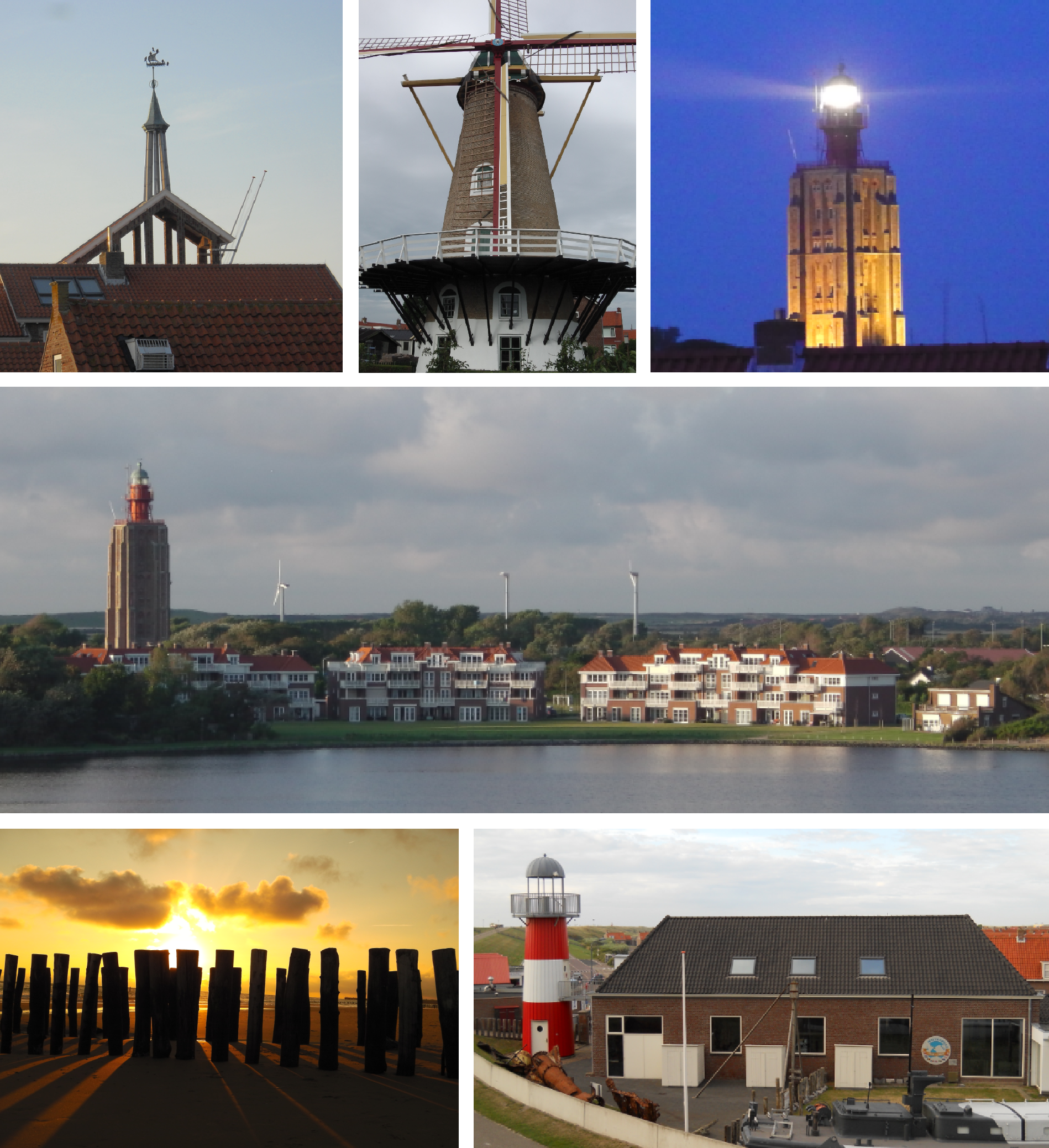
- Images from left to right; Tower of the old municipality building, old windmill, tall lighthouse, skyline, beach, Polderhuis museum

- Flag Coat of arms

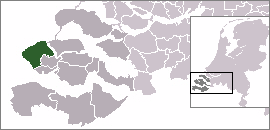

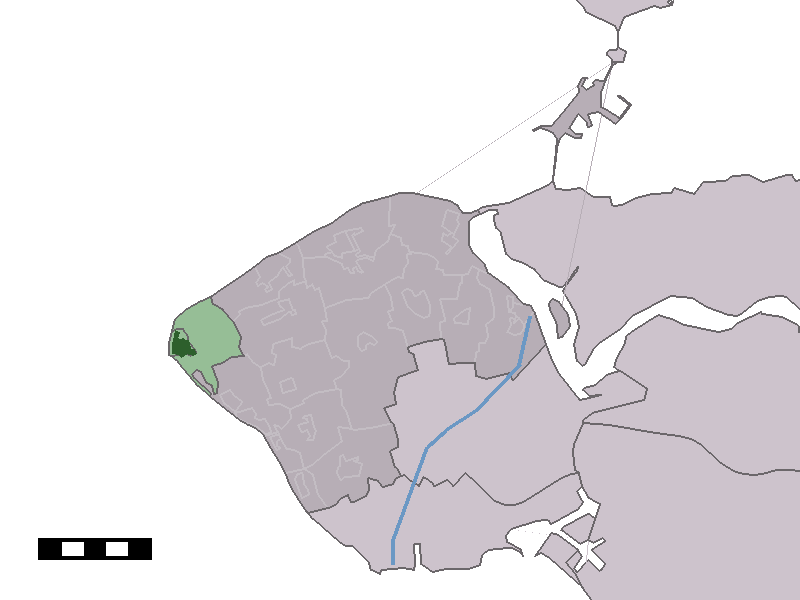
- The village centre (dark green) and the statistical district (light green) of Westkapelle in the municipality of Veere.
- Coordinates: 51°31′46″N 3°27′26″E
- Country: Netherlands
- Province: Zeeland
- Municipality: Veere

Population (1-1-2021)
  - Total: 2,632
- Time zone: UTC+1 (CET)
  - Summer (DST): UTC+2 (CEST)
- Postal code: 4361

Westkapelle (zeelandic: Weskappel, locally: Wasschappell) is a small city in the municipality of Veere on the island Walcheren, in the province Zeeland of the Netherlands. On 1 January 2021, it had a population of 2,632. Westkapelle is on the westernmost tip of Walcheren and is surrounded by the sea on three sides.

Westkapelle was a separate municipality from 1816 until 1997, when it was merged with Veere.

== Second World War ==
On 3 October 1944, the dyke to the south of town was destroyed by British bombers – an event still known in Westkapelle simply as "'t Bombardement" ("the Bombardment") – to flood the German occupation troops in Walcheren and so make liberation easier. 180 inhabitants were killed in the bombing and the village was all but wiped off the face of the earth by the bombs and the incoming sea. On 1 November 1944, during the Battle of the Scheldt British and Norwegian commandos performed an amphibious landing on the northern and southern edges of the gap made in the dyke. During these landings, only six people remained in the village; the rest of the survivors had been evacuated to other villages nearby. It took until 12 October 1945, more than a year later, to finally close the gap in the dyke.

A visible reminder of the Second World War is the brackish lake formed by the inrushing flood when the dike was bombed. An M4 Sherman tank was placed on the dyke as a memorial to the war and to the village's liberation. Behind the lighthouse, placed in a semicircle, are the graves of the war dead.

== Two lighthouses ==
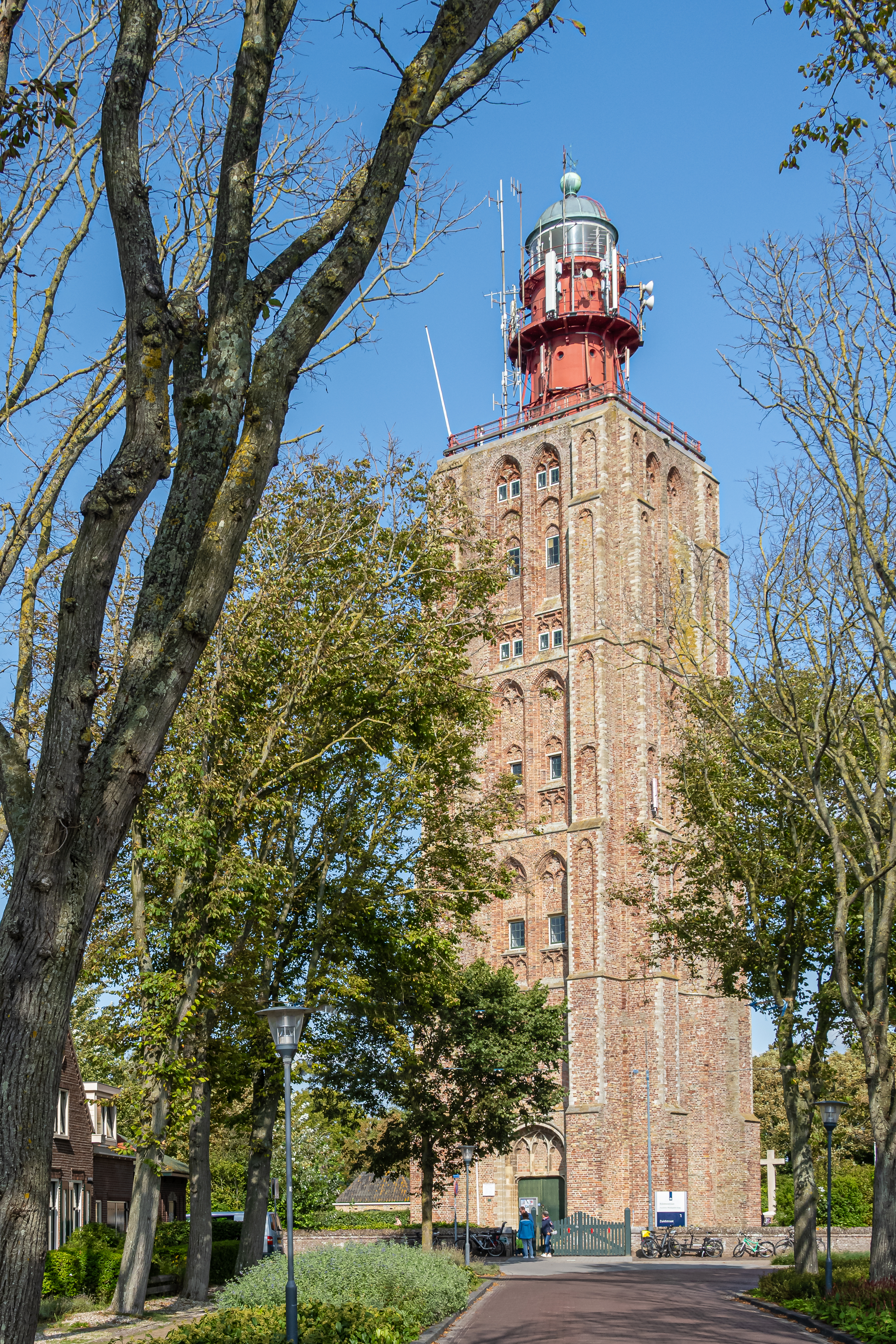
Tall lighthouse of Westkapelle

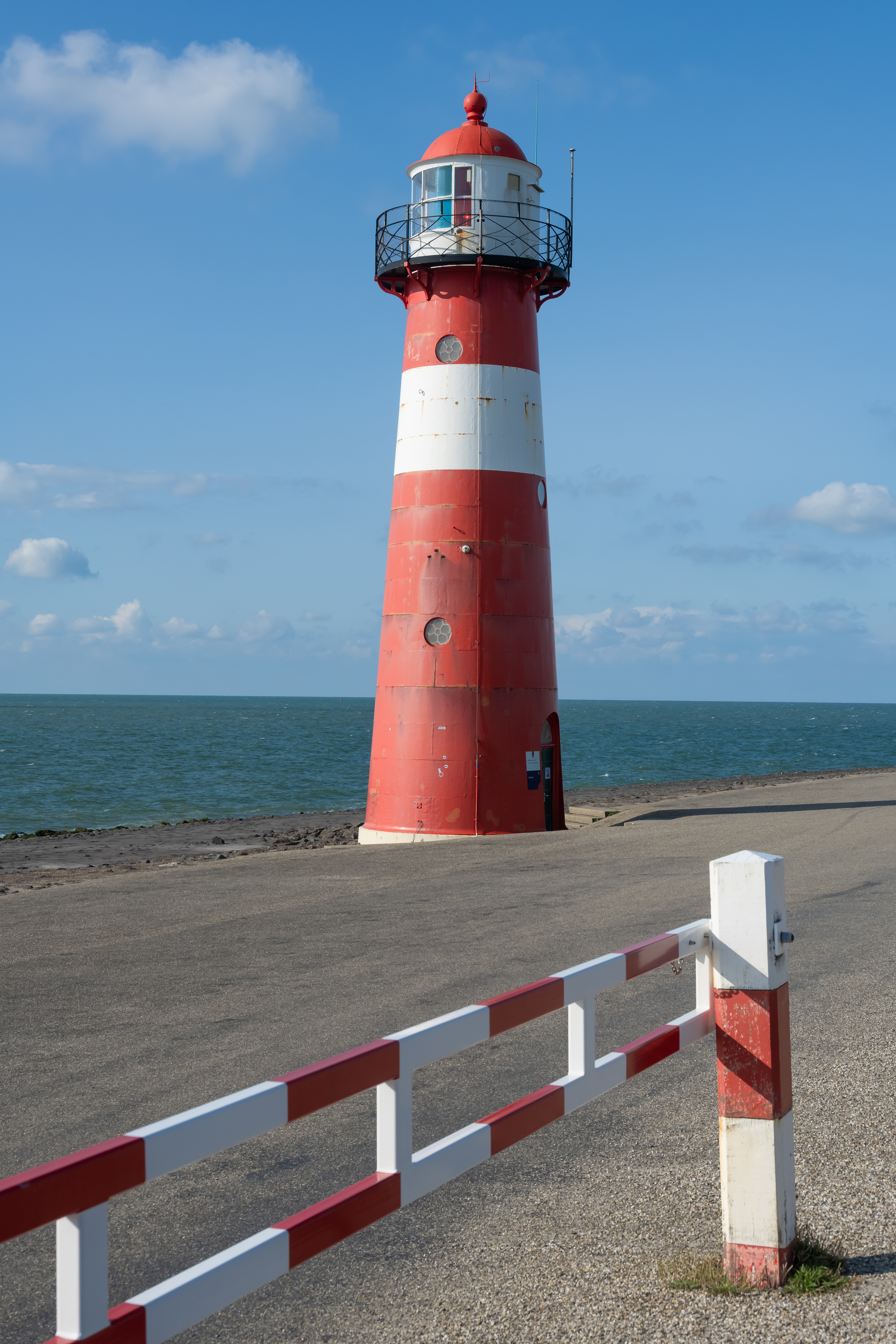
Short lighthouse of Westkapelle

Westkapelle has two active lighthouses.

The oldest lighthouse, built 1458–1470, 52 m (171 ft) tall, visible from 28 nautical miles (52 km; 32 mi) and standing prominently at the entrance to the village, is the remainder of a church that burned down in the 18th century. In 1818 the light was added to the top.

The other one, standing on the outer slope of the dyke, was built in 1875 of cast iron, is only 16 m (52 ft) tall and has a visibility range of 13 nautical miles (24 km; 15 mi).

Together they form leading lights, that lead vessels coming from the northern part of the North Sea into the narrow and busy shipping lane directly under the south west coast of Walcheren, that brings them into the Scheldt estuary and towards the ports of Flushing, Terneuzen, Ghent (via the Ghent–Terneuzen Canal) and Antwerp.

Confusingly there is a third – inactive – lighthouse on the inner side of the dyke. It is part of the Dijk- en Oorlogsmuseum (Dyke and War museum), and never has been active at that place.

== Nicknames ==
For a long time, Westkapelle was a very closed community, although this is less so nowadays due to tourism and the so-called import (people who moved to the village from other parts of the Netherlands). This was, and is, obvious from the limited number of surnames in the village; furthermore, because it was customary to name children after their grandparents, (great)uncles and (great)aunts, many people had exactly the same name.

To avoid confusion, nicknames were — and are — used in daily life. These vary enormously, and are sometimes attached to a single person but sometimes also to a family, and often a combination of both. The nickname can be derived from someone's real name, refer to one of his or her parents (and sometimes multiple generations back), and/or come from something completely different — again, combinations of these factors are commonplace. Outsiders who are not aware of this custom can experience difficulties because of it, since someone's real name is sometimes only barely known: he or she is really only known by the nickname, and remembering the real name is a bit of an effort.

For more official business, the father's first initial was often appended following the surname, followed by the letter "z" or "d" (for the Dutch "zoon" or "dochter", son or daughter): the name Johanna Minderhoud Hd, for example, indicates that she is the daughter of H. Minderhoud ("Hd" is short for "H-sdochter"): see patronymic. This was even used in such things as obituaries.

== Panoramic view ==
Westkapelle is surrounded at three sides by sea. Standing on the dyke at the westernmost tip, the 360° panoramic view over the village, the sea and the shipping lane – surprisingly close to the coast .

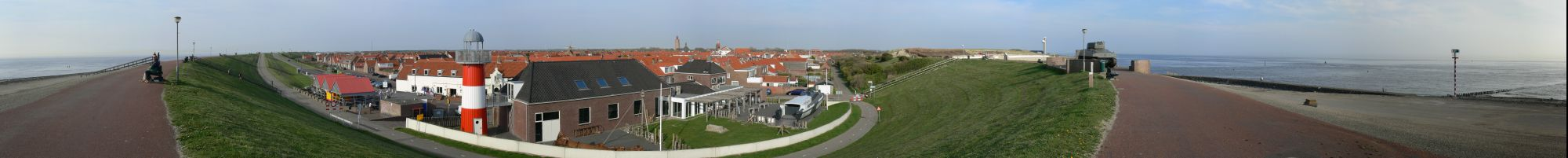
Panoramic view from the dyke over the village in the afternoon
