= Albert Sybrandus Keverling Buisman =

Dutch professor of Soil Mechanics

- Born: 2 November 1890; Hardinxveld-Giessendam, The Netherlands
- Died: 20 February 1944 (aged 53); Dutch East Indies
- Education: Technische Hogeschool Delft
- Known for: Establishing the Laboratorium voor Grondmechanica in Delft; Maastunnel
- Scientific career
- Fields: Civil engineering Soil mechanics
- Workplaces: Delft University of Technology; Bandung Institute of Technology; Laboratorium voor Grondmechanica
- Notable students: Emmericus Carel Willem Adriaan Geuze

Albert Sybrandus Keverling Buisman (2 November 1890 – 20 February 1944) was a Dutch civil engineer and Professor of Applied Mechanics, who was instrumental in establishing the Laboratorium voor Grondmechanica (English: Soil Mechanics Laboratory) in Delft. He made notable contributions to the development of soil mechanics in the Netherlands.

In addition to his academic works at Delft University of Technology, he was employed as an engineer and advisor by Hollandsche Beton Groep (HBG) in the Netherlands and Dutch East Indies, lectured on soil mechanics at Bandung Institute of Technology, and published one of the first comprehensive handbooks on soil mechanics, Grondmechanica (English: Soil Mechanics), which included extensive treatment on the specific soft soils of the Low Countries.

== Career ==
=== Education and early career ===
Keverling Buisman was born in Hardinxveld-Giessendam in 1890, and educated at the Hogere Burgerschool in Dordrecht. He then attended the Technische Hogeschool Delft, obtaining a degree in civil engineering. In 1912, Buisman joined the contractor Hollandsche Beton Groep (HBG), where he undertook works in the Netherlands and in Tanjung Priok in what was then the Dutch East Indies, now Indonesia.

=== Entry into academia ===
Keverling Buisman's name became known through the publication of several papers, mainly focused on Applied Mechanics, and in 1919 he was appointed professor of this subject in the Civil Engineering Department of the Delft University of Technology.

He gave his inaugural address, De toegepaste mechanica en het zuinig ontwerpen (English: The science of applied mechanics and economical design) on 12 November 1919, in which he focused on the role the subject plays in the development of the civil engineer. He argued that knowledge and application of formulas alone is insufficient for a civil engineer's development, and emphasised the need for practical experience.

=== The Soil Mechanics Laboratory in Delft ===
Keverling Buisman pioneered the implementation of scientific investigation into the challenges posed by the soft, water-bearing soils of low bearing capacity found in both the Netherlands and Indonesia. His efforts were expedited after the failures of earthworks on projects with serious consequences, including the Weesp train disaster in 1918 which was caused by the failure of an approach embankment at a railway bridge over the Merwede canal, and the failure of a number of dikes on the Zuiderzee in January 1916, which led to extensive flooding.

In 1920, Buisman became a member of a Dutch scientific committee of inquiry into foundations and soft soils headed by Cornelis Lely. His attitude towards the study of soil mechanics, informed by his practical experience and observation of the failures at Weesp and the Zuiderzee, led to the establishment of the Laboratory of Soil Mechanics at Delft in 1930, founded by Keverling Buisman and his colleague, hydraulic engineering professor Gerrit Hendrik van Mourik Broekman (1875–1948). The laboratory, initially funded by Keverling Buisman's private means and later aided by the Delft University Foundation, quickly became a major scientific centre for the study of soil mechanics in the Netherlands, and the largest laboratory of its type in the world. The first major project undertaken at the laboratory involved preliminary studies for the Maastunnel in Rotterdam, which opened in 1942.

By the late 1940s the laboratory was under the guidance of figures such as Gerrit Hendrik van Mourik Broekman and Emmericus Geuze, a former student of Keverling Buisman, and was attracting interest amongst the nascent global soil mechanics community. In 1948, Karl von Terzaghi, Alec Skempton, and Rudolph Glossop, attending the landmark 2nd International Conference on Soil Mechanics and Foundation Engineering in Rotterdam, visited the laboratory and were shown the systems of soil testing developed by Keverling Buisman for the first time.

=== Research work in soil mechanics ===
Keverling Buisman's most important research in soil mechanics included works on settlement models for large earthworks, such as embankments. He undertook work on creep and secondary consolidation for large embankments in 1936, introducing time effects which built on work which Terzaghi had undertaken on load-compression relationships in 1923. Terzaghi and Keverling Buisman's findings formed the basis of a model for settlement prediction proposed by Koppejan in 1948, which continues to be of importance in settlement predictions of embankments on soft soils.

He undertook the first application of equilibrium calculations using the Swedish slip circle method, considering both positive and negative water pressures. In addition, he undertook studies on stress distributions in soil, particularly concerning earth retaining structures, which factored in soil-structure interaction.

He developed field and laboratory measurement methods and sampling equipment, including an early triaxial shear test apparatus, the Celapparat, also known as the Dutch Cell Test. He further developed and tested the cone penetration test (CPT), which had been invented by Barentsen in 1931.

== Death ==
Keverling Buisman had acted as a temporary professor at Bandung Institute of Technology in the Dutch East Indies, to replace Jan Klopper who had returned to the Netherlands in 1925. This temporary posting lasted until 1926, when Professor Cornelis Gijsbert Jan Vreedenburgh was appointed as Klopper's permanent successor in Bandung.

In 1939, Professor Vreedenburgh was entitled to his scheduled leave to Holland, with Keverling Buisman once again called upon to undertake lectures at the Bandung Institute of Technology. He was subsequently prevented from returning to the Netherlands due to the outbreak of World War II and the subsequent German occupation. Vreedenburgh, similarly unable to leave Delft due to the war, took over Keverling Buisman's duties there. Keverling Buisman maintained his work and research from Bandung, even managing to complete a second edition of Grondmechanica there, which was readied for publication after Keverling Buisman's death by his fellow engineer and collaborator, T.K. Huizinga.

During the subsequent Japanese occupation of the Dutch East Indies, he was interned in 1943. He contracted an illness in a Japanese-run camp from which he did not recover, and died in February 1944.

== Legacy ==
Albert Sybrandus Keverling Buisman's contributions to soil mechanics, aside from the establishment of the Delft laboratory, included his development of the cell apparatus, which could effect any desired combination of principal soil stresses, and the cone apparatus for determining the shearing resistance of soil samples, all of which were significant advancements. He also co-formulated a theory on the flow phenomena of continuous capillary groundwater, which followed the same laws as phreatic groundwater. His work on consolidation and laboratory testing of soft soils, particularly peat, led to further development by Éamon Hanrahan and others, which continues to be influential.

He made pioneering studies on stress distributions in soil, especially at earth retaining structures, taking into account the relative deformations of soil and piles. His book, Grondmechanica, provided a comprehensive survey of contemporary soil mechanics and was published in several further editions, as recently as 1996.

The 2nd International Conference on Soil Mechanics and Foundation Engineering in 1948 was dedicated to Keverling Buisman. In the Netherlands, the Keverling Buisman Prijs (English: Keverling Buisman Prize) has been awarded since 2009 at the biennial Geotechnical Day of the Royal Netherlands Institute of Engineers (KIVI), for publications that contribute to the development of the field of geotechnical engineering. In 2017, Keverling Buisman was selected for the Alumni Walk of Fame to commemorate the 175th anniversary of Delft University of Technology.
