= Emmericus Carel Willem Adriaan Geuze =

Dutch professor of Civil Engineering

ir. Emmericus Carel Willem Adriaan Geuze
- Born: 17 March 1906; Dordrecht, The Netherlands
- Died: 3 November 1987 (aged 81); Rensselaer County, New York, United States
- Education: Technische Hoogeschoole Delft
- Known for: Developments of the Cone Penetration Test; Founding of the Géotechnique journal Head of Research at the Laboratorium voor Grondmechanica
- Spouse: Mélanie Nancy Veenstra (1934 – 1979, her death)
- Parent: Pieter Jan Geuze
- Scientific career
- Fields: Civil engineering Soil mechanics
- Workplaces: Delft University of Technology; Rensselaer Polytechnic Institute; Arab Potash Company; Laboratorium voor Grondmechanica; Koninklijk Instituut van Ingenieurs
- Academic advisors: Albert Sybrandus Keverling Buisman; Gerrit Hendrik van Mourik Broekman

Emmericus Carel Willem Adriaan "Wim" Geuze (17 March 1906 – 3 September 1987) was a Dutch civil engineer who contributed to the development of soil mechanics, and the founding of the geotechnical engineering journal, Géotechnique. He was head of research at the Laboratorium voor Grondmechanica (English: Soil Mechanics Laboratory) in Delft, and professor of soil mechanics at Delft University of Technology and the Rensselaer Polytechnic Institute.

Geuze was also an accomplished saxophonist, and a founder member of the Dutch Swing College Band. Deported to a forced labour camp in Germany during the Second World War, he escaped and returned to the Netherlands by hiding in a truck.

== Life and career ==
Geuze was born in Dordrecht in 1906, the son of Pieter Jan Geuze. After completing high school in 1923, he studied civil engineering at Technische Hoogeschoole Delft, where he studied under the founder of soil mechanics in the Netherlands, Albert Sybrandus Keverling Buisman. Geuze also studied coastal and river engineering under Gerrit Hendrik van Mourik Broekman. In 1931, he became a student member of the Royal Netherlands Society of Engineers (KIVI), becoming treasurer of the hydraulics department in 1940.

He was a founding member of the Laboratorium voor Grondmechanica Delft (later known as GeoDelft) in 1936 and was appointed head of the research department in 1949. He was appointed as lecturer in soil mechanics at Delft in 1946, and promoted to professor of soil mechanics in 1951. He published his acceptance speech for the position, entitled De ontwikkeling der grondmechanica tot technische wetenscchap (English: The Development of Soil Mechanics as a Technical Science), the same year.

In 1934, Geuze married Mélanie Nancy Veenstra in The Hague. She died unexpectedly in 1979. Known to his friends and colleagues as "Wim", he had multilingual proficiency in Dutch, English, French, and German, and was highly regarded by students and colleagues. A talented saxophonist, Geuze also became a founding member of the Dutch Swing College Band. During World War II, Geuze was arrested and deported to a labour camp in Germany. He escaped and returned to the Netherlands, hidden in a truck.

== Contributions to geotechnical engineering ==
Geuze's research initially focused on groundwater flow through dikes, employing the Hele-Shaw model, and the Dutch cell test, a concept originally designed by Buisman. He gained prominence for his work on the cone penetration test (CPT) and the critical density of sands, exploring various cone sizes to understand scaling rules. His innovative approach often involved creative solutions for transport and field testing.

Geuze was instrumental in the organisation of the 2nd International Conference on Soil Mechanics and Foundation Engineering in Rotterdam, contributing significantly and serving as the Secretary of the Organising Committee. In 1946, he met with Rudolph Glossop and Hugh Golder in the Netherlands, with the three discussing the creation of a journal dedicated to soil mechanics over drinks in a nightclub.

The group were encouraged by eminent engineer and soil mechanics expert, Karl von Terzaghi, and their work led to the founding of Géotechnique by a committee including Geuze, Glossop and Golder, along with engineers Edward E. de Beer, Leonard Cooling, Jean-Pierre Daxelhofer, Jacques Florentin, Robert Haefeli, Alec Skempton, Armin von Moos, and William H. Ward. The journal continues to be published by the Institution of Civil Engineers.

His work was recognised internationally, with papers published in esteemed journals, including Géotechnique. In 1958, he served on the Commissie voor het onderzoek naar de spanningstoestand in dijken (Commission for the Investigation into the State of Stress in Dikes), a Rijkswaterstaat commission which undertook investigations into the stability and geotechnical conditions of dikes in the Netherlands following the devastating effects of the North Sea flood of 1953, along with other engineers including Pieter Philippus Jansen and H.A. Ferguson. He also published research and studies on coastal and dike issues prior to this.

In 1960, the Dutch Ministry of Foreign Affairs assigned Geuze to Jordan to establish the Arab Potash Company, marking the beginning of what would become a significant industry. He later moved to the United States, joining the faculty at Rensselaer Polytechnic Institute in Troy, New York.

He died on 3 September 1987 in Rensselaer, New York.
