= Pieter Abraham van de Velde =

Dutch civil engineer and professor of hydraulic and road engineering

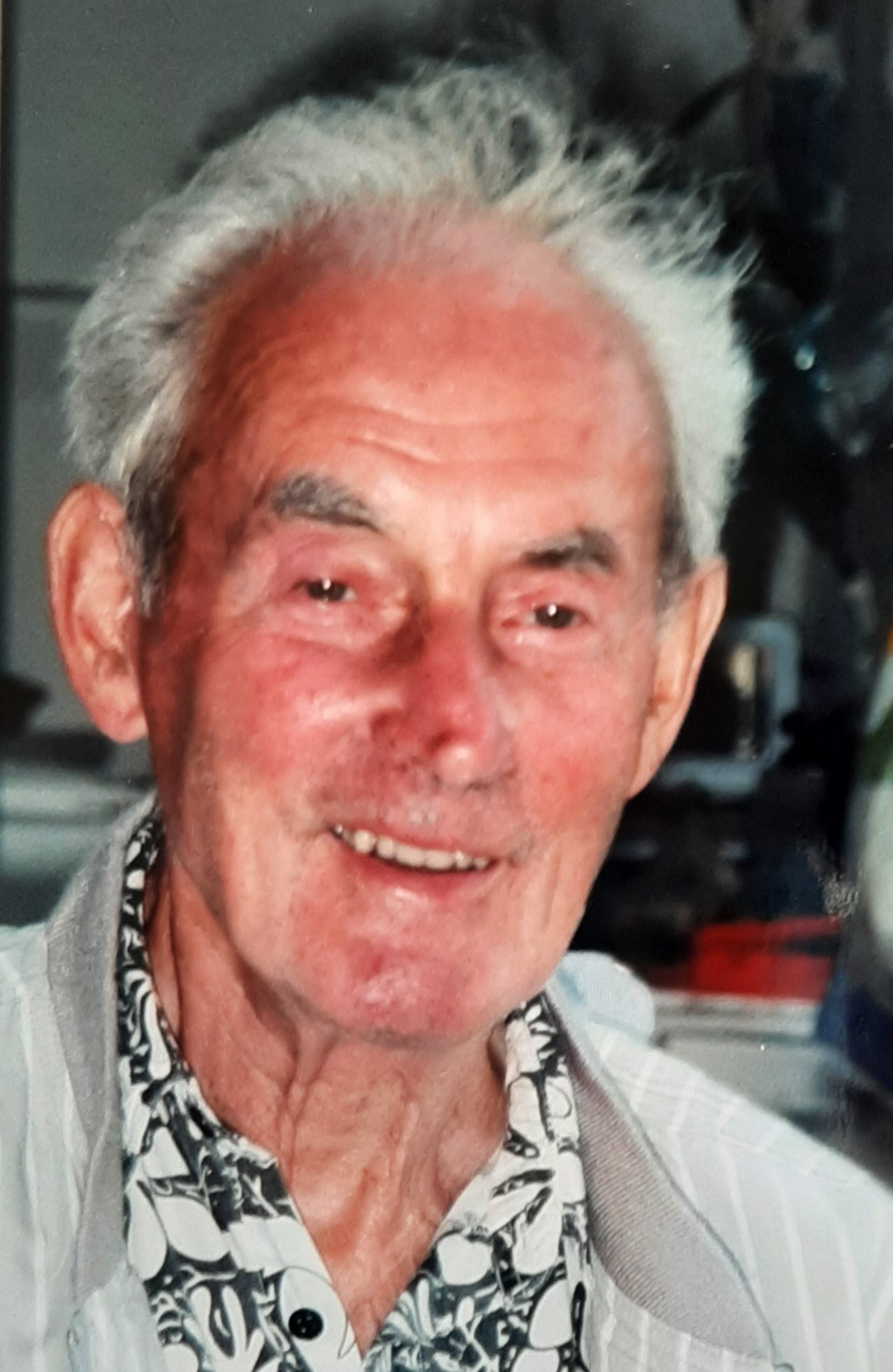
- Born: 22 November 1913; Utrecht, Netherlands
- Died: 10 May 2001 (aged 87); Alblasserdam, Netherlands
- Known for: Walcheren dike closures Restoration works after the 1953 North Sea flood Contributions to the Delta Works
- Scientific career
- Fields: Civil engineering Hydraulic engineering
- Institutions: Rijkswaterstaat; Delft University of Technology

Pieter Abraham van de Velde (22 November 1913 – 10 May 2001) was a Dutch civil engineer and professor of road and hydraulic engineering. He contributed to several major water engineering projects in the Netherlands, notably the drainage of Walcheren at the end of the Second World War, dike restorations following the 1953 North Sea flood, and the Deltaplan.

A proponent of integrating statistical methods into engineering, van de Velde advocated for probabilistic approaches to assess safety and manage uncertainty in the design of flood defences. In his 1980 farewell lecture at Delft University of Technology, he emphasised the limitations of deterministic safety factors and underscored the importance of using probabilistic techniques, such as Monte Carlo simulations, to model risks and failure probabilities in complex systems.

== Early life and education ==
Van de Velde was born on 22 November 1913 in Utrecht. He attended the Hogere Burgerschool and graduated as a civil engineer in 1937 from the Technische Hogeschool Delft. After completing his military service he worked for two years at the Waterloopkundig Laboratorium in Delft, followed by positions at Rijkswaterstaat until 1967.

== Career at Rijkswaterstaat ==
Van de Velde served in various roles at Rijkswaterstaat, including the last six years (1961–1966) as chief engineering director of the Deltadienst Noord (English: Delta Department, North) and the Directie Afsluitwerken (English: Directorate of Closure Works). During this period, he worked on major projects such as the design and construction of closure dams in Walcheren, the Zuiderzee, and the Delta Works.

=== Walcheren reclamation (1944–1945) ===
During the drainage of Walcheren at the end of World War II, van de Velde was part of the engineering team of the Dienst Droogmaking Walcheren (English: Walcheren Reclamation Service), which was led by Pieter Philippus Jansen. Their task involved sealing breaches in the dikes created by Allied bombing. The event was later chronicled in the novel Het verjaagde water by A. den Doolaard, in which van de Velde is portrayed as the character “Schoonebloem".

=== Repairs following the 1953 North Sea flood ===
In the aftermath of the North Sea flood of 1953, van de Velde oversaw work to close large dike breaches near the Schelphoek and Ouwerkerk. Van de Velde was appointed as lead engineer for the Schelphoek breach on 27 April 1953, which had become so deep due to strong ebb and flood currents that it could not be closed using traditional methods. Under van de Velde's leadership, a strategy combining innovative engineering and adaptive management was employed. Initial studies examined the hydrodynamic and geological conditions of the site, with extensive tidal calculations and laboratory experiments conducted to assess the forces acting on the breach and predict the behaviour of water flow during the closure process. The dynamic nature of the breach required real-time measurements and adjustments to the proposed solutions.

The construction of a replacement dike was approached in stages, starting with preparatory works to stabilize the surrounding area. The final closure was executed using massive Phoenix caissons, pre-fabricated concrete structures that had previously been used by the Allies in World War II during the Normandy landings, and had been used at Walcheren. The caissons were carefully positioned on a prepared bed of stone and sand, forming a watertight barrier that allowed for the gradual re-establishment of the dike.

Van de Velde also played a significant role in the closure of the breach at Ouwerkerk, which involved the use of 11,500 workers, 4 Phoenix caissons, as well as a number of tugboats and stone dumping vessels. The final caisson was placed on the evening of 6 November 1953, in the presence of Queen Juliana and the Dutch prime minister Willem Drees.

=== Involvement in the Delta Works ===
Van de Velde's contributions to the Delta Works included the design of the Haringvlietdam between 1958 and 1970, where he was chief structural engineer for the design of the sluices. For the construction of the Grevelingendam, van de Velde came up with the idea of using a 1.9 kilometre-long cable car system. The advantage of this system in the required gradual vertical closure was that flow velocities were limited, resulting in a reduction in the magnitude of scour holes either side of the dam. Another advantage of the cable car solution was that only a single pylon was required in the centre of the channel. The cable car system was designed by van de Velde and staff at Rijkswaterstaat, in combination with the French company Neyrpic, and used self-propelled cars and a one-way system to optimise capacity.

He later advised on plans for the closure of the Eastern Scheldt, which was accomplished by constructing the Oosterscheldekering (Eastern Scheldt Storm Surge Barrier) between the islands of Schouwen-Duiveland and Noord-Beveland. Spanning nine kilometres, the dam was the largest component of the entire Delta Works.

Originally the dam had been designed, and partly built, as a fully closed structure. However, following public protests from environmental activists and fishing communities, the Den Uyl cabinet decided in 1974 to make major alterations to the project, thereby requiring a partially open design. Such a structure was unprecedented worldwide, with no existing design codes or construction experience to draw upon. An alternative design was subsequently adopted, featuring substantial sluice-gate doors installed along the final four kilometres of the dam. Under normal circumstances, these gates are left open to allow natural tidal movement, but they can be securely closed during adverse weather conditions.

Van de Velde advised the contractor, Dijksbouw Oosterschelde, and liaised with the chief engineer Frank Spaargaren and other key hydraulic engineers such as Jan Agema during the construction. Whilst the innovative design safeguarded the saltwater marine ecosystem, enabled continued fishing activities, and provided effective flood control for the land behind the dam, van de Velde expressed public criticism of the alternative design, believing that the safety risks were too great and the cost estimates for construction too optimistic.

The Oosterscheldekering was completed in 1986 and officially opened by Beatrix of the Netherlands on 4 October that year.

== Professor at Delft University of Technology (1966–1980) ==
From 1966 until his retirement in 1980, Van de Velde was appointed as a professor of civil engineering at the Technische Hogeschool Delft, succeeding Pieter Philippus Jansen. He taught courses, supervised doctoral research, and continued to advise on coastal defences, reclamation projects, and major hydraulic engineering projects in the Netherlands and abroad. He also served on technical advisory committees, including the Technische Adviescommissie voor de Waterkeringen (TAW) (English: Technical Advisory Committee on Flood Defences), chairing the group on dike coverings that produced guidelines for using asphalt in hydraulic engineering works.

In 1980, van de Velde delivered his farewell lecture, "Veiligheid en Monte Carlo" (Safety and Monte Carlo), at Delft. The lecture explored the challenges of ensuring safety in civil engineering, particularly in the context of Dutch water management. Van de Velde emphasised the importance of probabilistic methods, such as the Monte Carlo approach, to account for uncertainties in factors like material strength, environmental loads, and design parameters. He reflected on the limitations of deterministic safety factors, advocating for statistical techniques to assess the likelihood of structural failure. Drawing from the history of Dutch flood defences, he highlighted key advances in dike safety after the 1953 disaster, including the integration of statistical insights into design standards.

In particular, van de Velde credited the pioneering work of Pieter Jacobus Wemelsfelder as instrumental in shaping modern approaches to flood defence, noting how a 1938 paper by Wemelsfelder had introduced the application of statistical methods to analyse storm surge heights, challenging the then-standard practice of basing dike heights solely on historical maximum water levels. Van de Velde also acknowledged the work of David van Dantzig on integrating statistical probabilities of extreme water levels with economic considerations, and underscored how this statistical framework allowed for more efficient dike improvements, where modest height increases could drastically reduce failure probabilities, marking a turning point in the Dutch approach to water management.

== Honours ==
- Officer of the Order of Orange-Nassau

== Selected publications ==
- Van de Velde, P.A.; Gerritse, F. (1955). Afsluiting stroomgat Schelphoek [Closure of the Schelphoek Inlet] (in Dutch). Rijkswaterstaat.
- Van de Velde, P.A. (1961). "Ervaringen met de toepassing van asfalt in de dijkbouw" [Experiences with the use of asphalt in dike construction]. Weg en Waterbouw (3–4).
- Van de Velde, P.A. (1967). Fortse en soeticheijt in de waterbouwkunde [Fortitude and Softness in Hydraulic Engineering] (in Dutch). (Inaugural lecture as professor; title references a quote by Andries Vierlingh).
- Van de Velde, P.A. (1972). Kunststoffen en oeverbescherming [Plastics and Embankment Protection] (in Dutch). et al. KIvI & K&O Symposium.
- Van de Velde, P.A. (1976). Polders en waterkeringen [Polders and Water Defences]. (Lecture Notes). Delft University of Technology.
- Van de Velde, P.A. (1980). Veiligheid en Monte Carlo [Safety and Monte Carlo] (in Dutch). (Valedictory lecture at Delft).

== See also ==
- Delta Works
- Flood control in the Netherlands
- Grevelingendam
- Haringvlietdam
- Oosterscheldekering
- Rijkswaterstaat
