= Pieter Philippus Jansen =

Dutch civil engineer

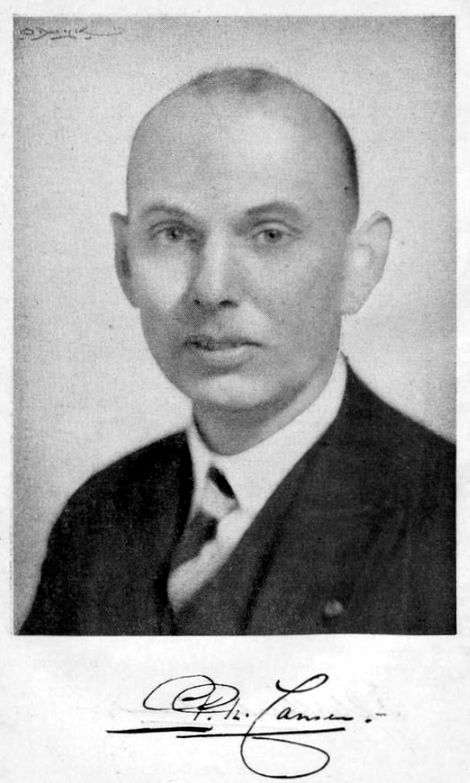
- Jansen pictured in 1947
- Born: 11 August 1902; Dordrecht, The Netherlands
- Died: 5 July 1982 (aged 79); Bussum, The Netherlands
- Citizenship: Netherlands
- Education: Delft University of Technology
- Known for: Zuiderzee Works; Afsluitdijk; Early phases of the Delta Works; Reclamation and recovery works following the Inundation of Walcheren
- Awards: Order of the Netherlands Lion(1946); Order of Orange-Nassau(1959)
- Scientific career
- Fields: Civil Engineering; Hydraulic Engineering
- Workplaces: Rijkswaterstaat; Delft University of Technology

Pieter Philippus Jansen (11 August 1902 – 5 July 1982) was a Dutch civil engineer and hydraulic engineer who made significant contributions to hydraulic engineering in The Netherlands. He spent the majority of his career with Rijkswaterstaat, working on several major projects including the first phase of the Delta Works and leading the reclamation and repair efforts following the inundation of Walcheren.

== Life and career ==
Jansen studied Civil Engineering at Delft University of Technology, graduating in 1926. He joined Rijkswaterstaat, beginning his career with the Zuiderzee Works where he was involved in the construction of the Afsluitdijk. During his career, he was engaged in water management for major Dutch rivers including the Meuse and the canalisation of the IJssel. In 1944, he worked in Breda where he was concerned with preparations for dike improvements in the Biesbosch region and surrounding areas.

In 1956, he became head of the Delta Service, the division of Rijkswaterstaat responsible for the construction of the Delta Works. Under his leadership, the first closures (the Zandkreekdam and the Veerse Gatdam) were completed. He then led the early phases of the construction of the Grevelingendam, the Volkerakdam, and the Haringvlietdam. He resigned from his position in 1962 for health reasons, and was succeeded by J.J. Volkers.

In 1946, he accepted the position of professor in the Department of Civil Engineering at Delft University of Technology. He continued to serve as an advisor to Rijkswaterstaat in this role. After his appointment as head of the Delta Service, this position was converted into a part-time professorship. He was succeeded as Professor of Civil Engineering at Delft in 1966 by Pieter Abraham van de Velde. Jansen died in 1982 at the age of 79 in Bussum.

== The reclamation of Walcheren ==
In October 1944, several dikes surrounding the Dutch island of Walcheren were deliberately bombed by The Allies of World War II during Operation Infatuate at strategic locations including Westkapelle, Vlissingen, and Fort Rammekens in order to deliberately flood the island. The bombings created major gaps in the dikes at four primary locations, breaching the coastal defences against The North Sea and allowing seawater to flow unchecked into inhabited areas of land.

Whilst the bombings achieved the immediate military objective of forcing a retreat of the occupying forces of Nazi Germany, who had used Walcheren to control the Western Scheldt and access to The Port of Antwerp, the subsequent flooding caused by the breaches had profound effects on the island infrastructure and local population.

Jansen was appointed to lead the Dienst Droogmaking Walcheren (Service for the Reclamation of Walcheren), which had been specially set up to oversee the subsequent efforts to repair the breaches in the dikes and reclaim Walcheren from the sea. The works were completed by a number of Dutch contractors, including some with appropriate previous experience from the Zuiderzee works. In the non-fiction novel Het verjaagde water by A. den Doolaard about the reclamation works, Jansen features prominently under the pseudonym Van Hummel.

Jansen successfully managed the completion of the works, overcoming several technical and equipment-supply issues, including the fact that many dredgers were still located in areas of the occupied Netherlands, and around 25% of the Dutch dredging fleet had been confiscated and transported to Germany.

By October 1945, the contractors and Rijkswaterstaat had managed to assemble a fleet of 14 suction dredgers and bucket dredgers, 135 barges, 61 tugboats, 73 landing craft, 19 floating cranes, 52 bulldozers and draglines along with motor vehicles and other equipment. Difficulties in sourcing adequate materials and the sheer scale of the works during an emergency wartime situation led to innovative use of improvised materials and equipment, such as the Phoenix caissons used in the closure of the dike gaps, which had previously been used as Mulberry harbours during the Allied invasion of Normandy.

On 1 July 1946, he left the Service for the Reclamation of Walcheren, and was appointed as a professor at Delft University of Technology. In September of that year, he received the Order of the Netherlands Lion on the same day as A. den Doolaard.

== The Storm Disaster of 1953 and the Delta Works ==
After the devastating effects of the North Sea Flood of 1953 on The Netherlands, Jansen had an advisory role in the closure of the various dike breaches across the country.

After the flood of 1953, the Delta Commission was formed with the task of preparing measures so that this "would never happen again". Jansen became one of the members of that commission. He played a significant role in the final report. In September 1953, he was appointed as Chief Engineer-Director at Rijkswaterstaat, tasked with carrying out the Delta Works.

From 1956 onwards, this work was carried out by a separate service, the Delta Service, of which Jansen became director. He was in charge of the closures of the Zandkreek and the Veerse Gat. In his role as head of the Delta Service, he made a significant contribution to innovations in hydraulic engineering. He played a particularly important role in the creation of the Combinatie Speurwerk Baggertechniek (Dredging Techniques Research Joint Venture). This collaboration of the major Dutch dredging contractors was established at his insistence, as he correctly predicted that increased dredging capacity would be needed to complete the Delta Works.

Jansen also provided support for research into new coastal erosion protection techniques, and the introduction of mathematical models for tide calculations. He also oversaw the establishment of the Ontwikkeling nieuwe werkmethoden (New working methods department) within the Delta Service. On Koningsdag, 1959, he was promoted to knight in the Order of Orange-Nassau.

== The Technical Advisory Committee for the Water Barriers ==
In 1955, Jansen was appointed as chairman of the Commissie voor het onderzoek naar de spanningstoestand in dijken (Commission for the Investigation into the State of Stress in Dikes). This commission was tasked with investigating why the stability of dikes was such a big problem during the storm disaster of 1953.

The commission consisted of several experts from the Rijkswaterstaat, Delft University of Technology and the Delft Laboratory for Soil Mechanics, including Emmericus Geuze. In their final report, the commission made recommendations for calculating the geotechnical stability of dikes. This knowledge was used for major defences such as the Delta Works, but not for testing all other existing water barriers and flood defences.

After the breach of a quay in Tuindorp-Oostzaan in 1960, Rijkswaterstaat identified that many secondary barriers, which were not part of the Delta Works, were insufficiently robust. These secondary barriers and dikes were often managed by small, scattered water boards. In order to address the situation, the Technische Adviescommissie voor de Waterkeringen (TAW - Technical Advisory Committee for Flood Defences) was created in 1965. Jansen was asked to chair this body. This organisation had a more permanent nature than the aforementioned commission, and was also explicitly tasked with issuing guidelines for the design and testing of water barriers.

== International Works ==
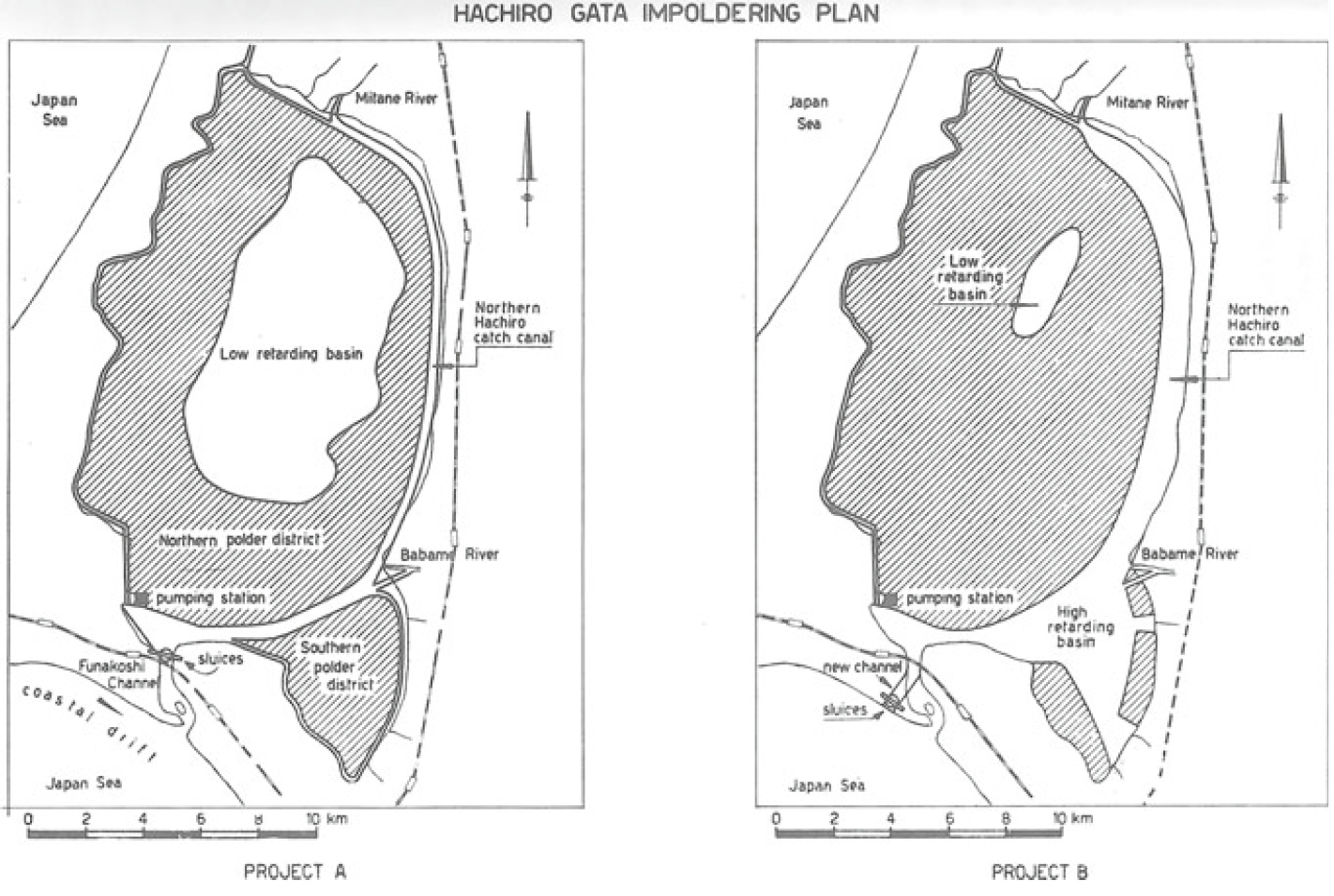
Jansen's plans for the Hachirōgata polder

In addition to his main duties, Jansen supported Dutch engineering firms in exporting Dutch knowledge abroad. Whilst engaged by the Nedeco (Netherlands Engineering Consultants) group of consulting firms, he was active in many countries, with his work including river studies in Nigeria for the Niger and Benue, the study of the construction of a canal through the Kra Isthmus in Thailand, works in Japan for the Hachirōgata Polder (八郎潟調整池, Hachirō-gata chōseichi), land reclamation works in India (including work in the Ganges Delta and construction of Haldia Port), the stability of dikes in Venezuela, The Wash in the UK, a transport study in Suriname, and various studies into river management and ports in Bangladesh.

In 1962, Jansen provided advice to the authorities in Hamburg on closing the breaches in defences following major flooding during the North Sea flood of 1962. In the same year, he gave a lecture at the Institution of Civil Engineers in London on the Delta Works.

== Publications ==
Jansen wrote several articles in the Dutch engineering journal, De Ingenieur, including "Communications regarding the reclamation of Walcheren" (2 issues, 1946), and was the chief editor of the textbook Principles of river engineering, published in 1979 with a second edition in 1994.

== Gallery ==
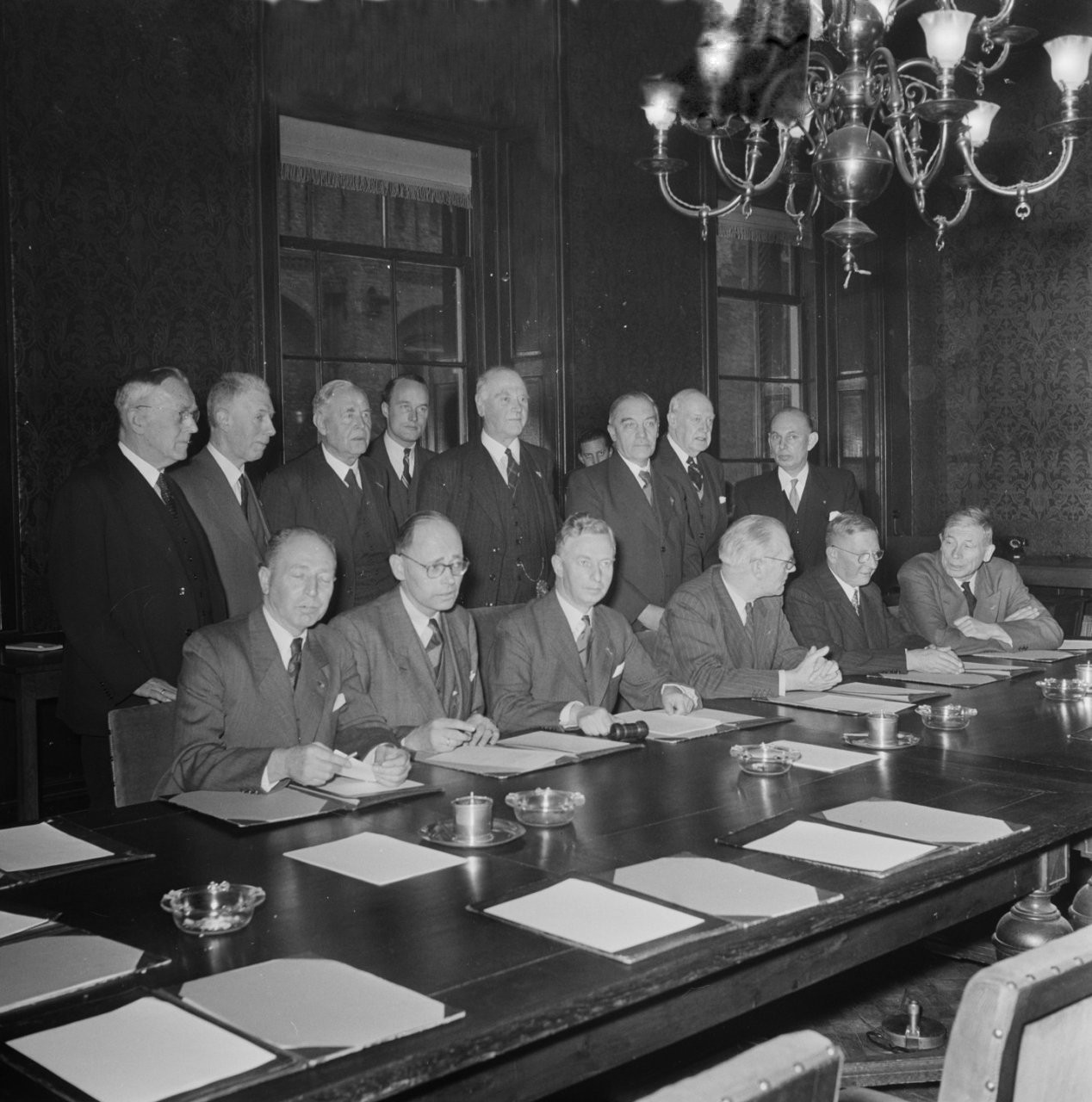
Installation of the Delta Committee, 21 February 1953

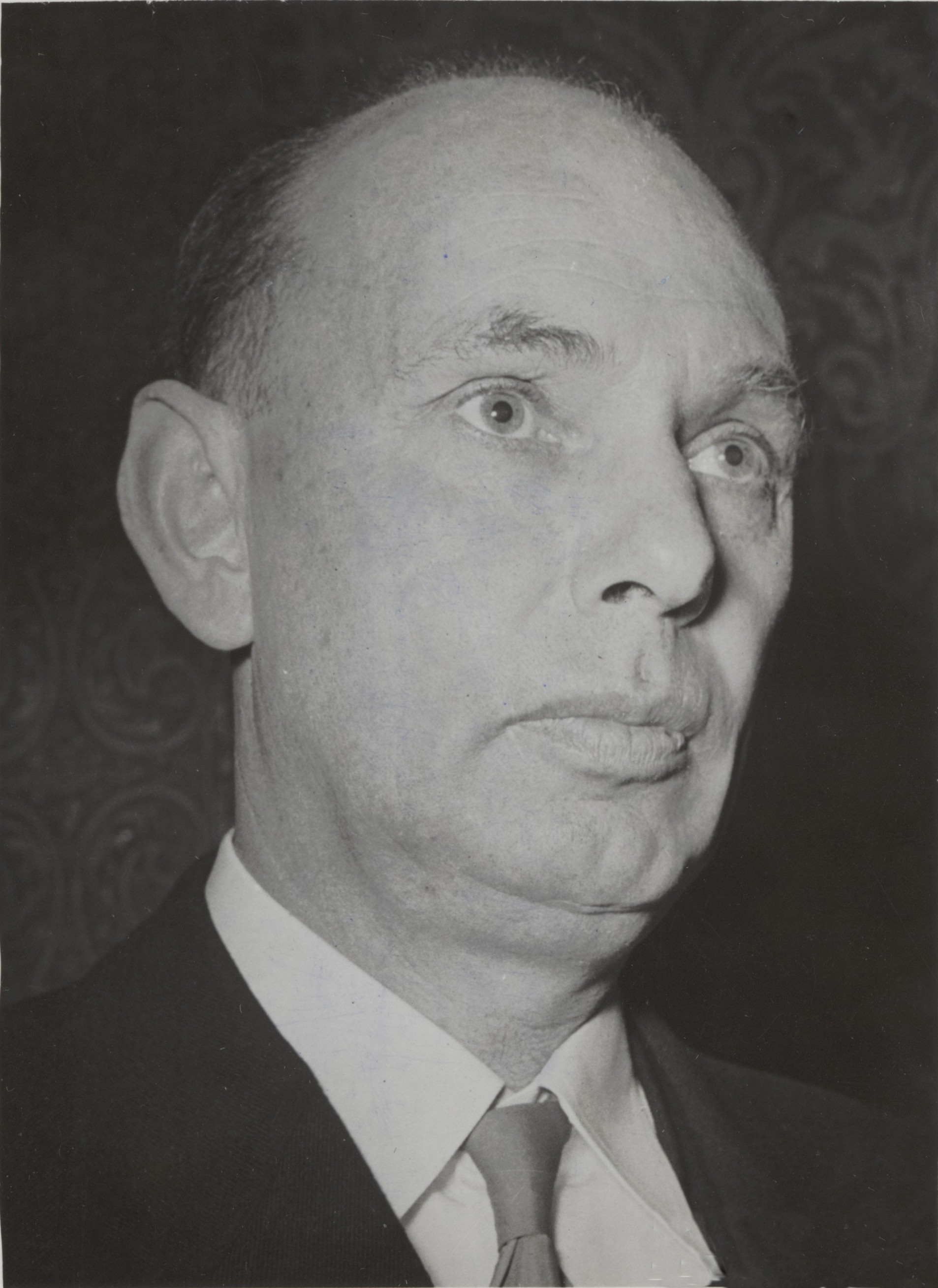
Jansen in 1953.

A newsreel from February 1946 shows areas in reclaimed Walcheren, further to the works led by Jansen.

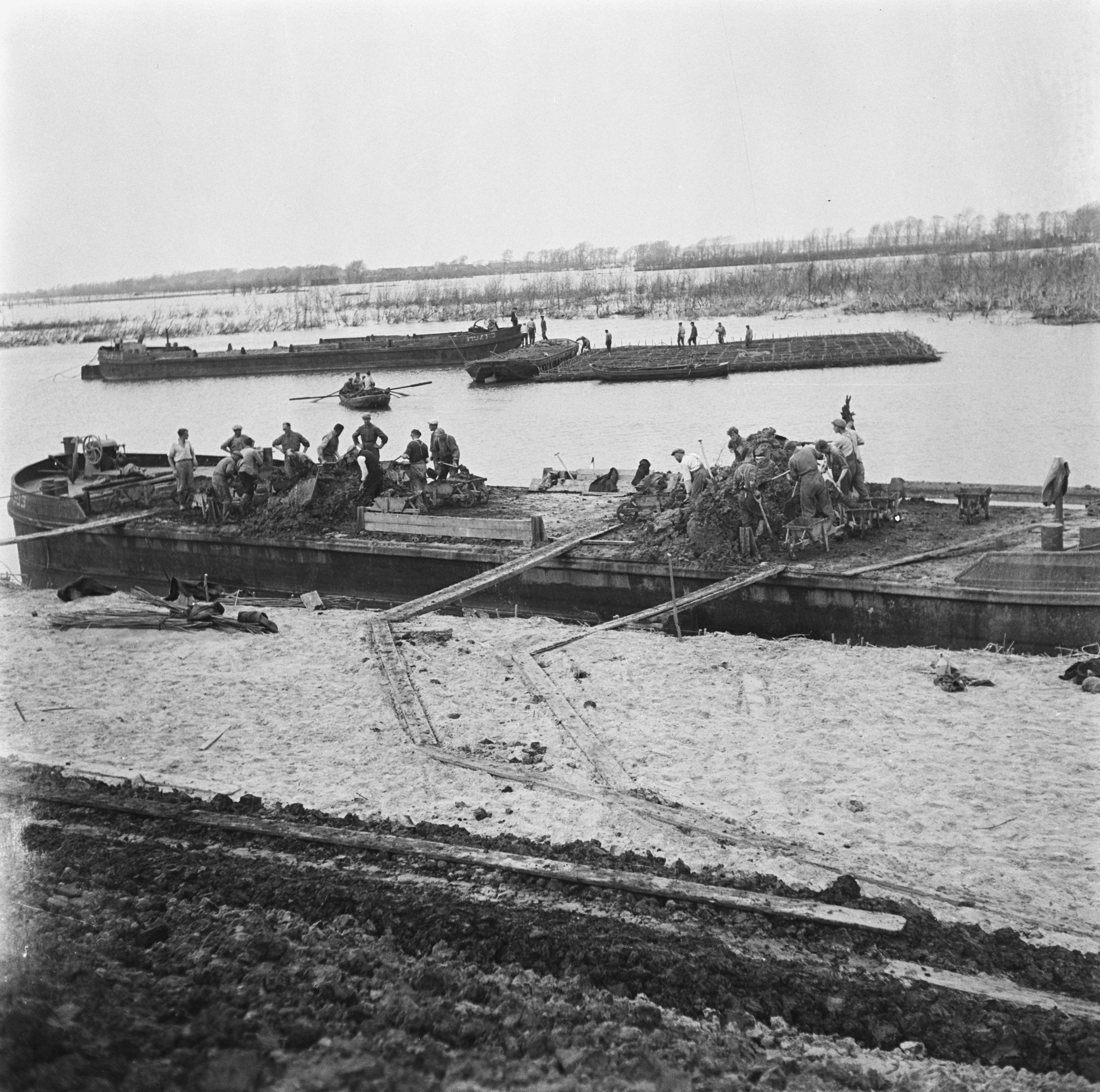
Closing the breach at the Nolledijk in Vlissingen, October 1945.

== See also ==
- Flood control in the Netherlands
- Delta Works
- Zuiderzee Works
- Rijkswaterstaat
- Inundation of Walcheren
