= Boring (earth) =

Drilling into the Earth

Boring is drilling a hole, tunnel, or well in the Earth. It is used for various applications in geology, agriculture, hydrology, civil engineering, and mineral exploration. Today, most Earth drilling serves one of the following purposes:

- return samples of the soil and/or rock through which the drill passes
- access rocks from which material can be extracted
- access rocks which can then be measured
- provide access to rock for purposes of providing engineering support

Unlike drilling in other materials where the aim is to create a hole for some purpose, often the case of drilling or coring is to get an understanding of the ground/lithology. This may be done for prospecting to identify and quantify an ore body for mining, or to determining the type of foundations needed for a building or raised structure, or for underground structures, including tunnels and deep basements where an understanding of the ground is vital to determining how to excavate and the support philosophy. Drilling is also used in vertical and inclined shaft construction.

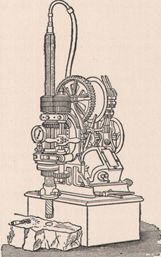
A boring machine illustration from the 1911 Encyclopædia Britannica.

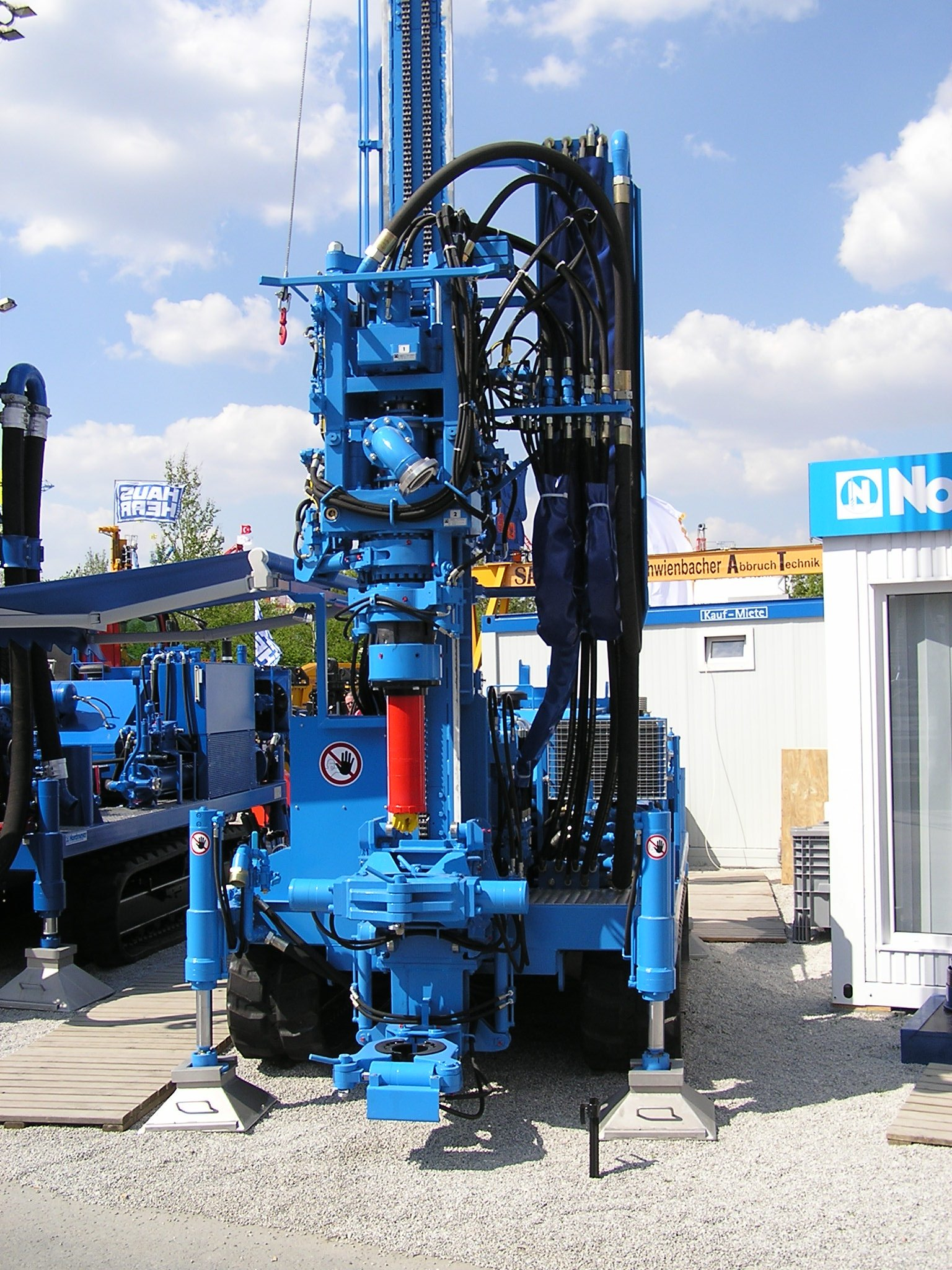
Mud log in process, a common way to study the lithology when drilling wells.

== History ==
Borehole drilling has a long history. Han dynasty China (202 BC – 220 AD) used deep borehole drilling for mining and other projects. Chinese borehole sites could reach as deep as 600 m (2,000 ft).

== Methods ==
When drilling in stone, one must pay particular attention to the type of material. There are three different classifications of drill bits used for drilling into stone: soft, medium, and hard. Soft formation rock bits are used in unconsolidated sands, clays, and soft limestones, etc. Medium formation bits are used in dolomites, limestones, and shale, while hard formation bits are used in hard shale, mudstones, granite, limestones and other hard and/or abrasive formations.

Soft ground drilling can be undertaken using a rotary auger or wash boring techniques, while rock drilling often use methods such as NMLC which allow for recovery of a core of material which can be examined to determine the strength, degree of weathering, understanding of any how intact the rock is (RQD) and identify any discontinuities or other planes of weakness.

Testing of the material in boreholes is also possible. In soft ground the standard penetration test can be used to determine the strength of the material. In rock in-situ stress testing using hydrofracturing or overcoring, Acoustic Televiewer can be used to map discontinuities to determine their orientation. It is also possible once a borehole is complete to measure the permeability. Samples of water and material are also taken for examination and lab testing.

== Superdeep Borehole ==
In 1961 the United States began Project Mohole, an ambitious attempt to drill through the Earth's crust into the Mohorovičić discontinuity. The project was discontinued due to high cost.

The Kola Superdeep Borehole was a similar project of the USSR in the 1970s and early 1980s the USSR attempted to drill a hole through the crust, to sample the Mohorovičić discontinuity. The deepest hole ever drilled failed not because of lack of money or time, but because of rock physics at depth. At approximately 12,000 metres depth, rock begins to act more like a plastic solid than a rigid solid. Rock temperatures of several hundred degrees Celsius, required that the drilling fluid be refrigerated before being sent to the cutting face of the drill. As the drill bits burnt out and were removed for replacement, the hole simply flowed closed, and the rock had to be re-drilled. The hole was scrapped.

Further attempts are planned by American consortia and further Russian attempts in Finland.

== Ice boring ==
Ice cores are drilled by hollow bits, in much the same way that sediment cores are drilled. When all that is needed is the hole, hot water drill technology may be used to melt holes in ice or snow for both Arctic and Antarctic research purposes. Equipment for such a method is also lightweight when drilling deep holes, compared to traditional drilling equipment. Hot water drilling has been used successfully in the IceCube Neutrino Detector and Antarctic Muon And Neutrino Detector Array projects to drill as deep as 2,450 meters.

== See also ==
- Directional boring
- Drifter (drill)
- Oil well
- Standard penetration test
- Tunnel boring machine
