= Éamon Hanrahan =

Irish geotechnical engineer and professor of soil mechanics

Edward T. Hanrahan
- Born: 1917; Limerick, Ireland
- Died: 30 November 2012 (aged 94–95); Dublin, Ireland
- Education: University College Dublin
- Known for: Geotechnics of peat and soft soils Creation of the first postgraduate course in soil mechanics in Ireland
- Scientific career
- Fields: Civil Engineering; Soil Mechanics; Geotechnical Engineering
- Workplaces: University College Dublin

Edward (Éamon) T. Hanrahan (1917 – 30 November 2012) was an Irish civil engineer, Associate Professor of Civil Engineering, and Head of department in the School of Civil, Structural and Environmental Engineering at University College Dublin (UCD). Owing to his contributions to geotechnical engineering education and practice in Ireland, a biennial lecture at UCD's Geotechnical Society is named in his honour.

Hanrahan undertook studies and research on soil mechanics and foundation engineering, particularly on soft soils such as peat. In 1955, he created the first postgraduate soil mechanics course in for students in Ireland. He published work in Irish and British journals including Géotechnique, and published several works on peat and glacial tills which continue to be cited in soil mechanics and geotechnical engineering research.

== Early life and education ==
Hanrahan was born in Limerick City in 1917. He attended local primary and secondary schools before studying engineering at UCD. He was awarded a BE degree in Civil Engineering in 1939.

== Career ==
After working in England during the 1940s, Hanrahan returned to Ireland and joined the faculty at UCD in 1948, where he remained until his retirement in 1987. He pursued interests in soil mechanics and foundation engineering from early in his career. Hanrahan was awarded an ME degree in 1946, a PhD in 1954, and a DSc in 1983.

Hanrahan played a role in establishing geotechnical engineering research at UCD by developing the first postgraduate course in soil mechanics there in 1955. His research focused on the mechanical properties and deformation characteristics of soft soils, especially peat.

Hanrahan developed laboratory facilities to support his research at UCD. In 1953 and 1954, he designed and supervised remediation works to a road between Edenderry and Rathangan which had begun to disintegrate in the late 1940s. An initial repair strategy had involved the uncontrolled use of gravel for consolidation, leading to uneven settlements and road deformations. To rectify this, Hanrahan proposed reconstruction using bales of horticultural peat as a lightweight fill, topped with gravel, which successfully stabilised the road.

Hanrahan undertook experiments to measure pore-water pressure during shearing and consolidation, and examined the strength of peat under various conditions. In 1954, he published work discussing the effects of load and time on peat's permeability and investigated its compressibility and rate of consolidation. He built upon foundational studies on soft soils by Albert Sybrandus Keverling Buisman and others, conducting laboratory tests on peat to explore its physical properties such as permeability, shear, and consolidation characteristics.

Hanrahan's work extended the theoretical framework provided by Keverling Buisman by offering practical insights and empirical data, particularly focusing on the unique behaviour of peat under various conditions. This progression signified a development from theoretical and generalized concepts of soft soil mechanics towards more specific and detailed understanding of peat's behavior in engineering applications.

His work was published in several national and international journals and is still cited, including his papers in Géotechnique in 1954 and 1964. His book, an analysis of soil behaviour under applied loading, entitled The Geotechnics of Real Materials: The $E_g$,$E_k$ Method, was published by Elsevier in 1985. Hanrahan's contributions to soil mechanics were not limited to peat and soft soils, and he also contributed to improved understanding of the behaviour of glacial tills in Ireland.

== Personal life ==
Hanrahan had an interest in the Irish language, Gaelic games, and he was a lifelong member of the St Vincent de Paul Society.

== Legacy ==
Hanrahan's work in geotechnical engineering, especially his research on peat and soft soils, has been widely cited. A biennial lecture at the Geotechnical Society of UCD is named in his honour.

== Selected publications ==
- Hanrahan, E.T. (1954). An investigation of physical properties of peat. Géotechnique 4, No. 3, 108–121, Link.
- Hanrahan, E.T. (1964). A road failure on peat. Géotechnique 14, No. 3, 185–202, Link.
- Hanrahan, E.T. (1965). A design method for construction on peat. Transactions of the Institution of Civil Engineers of Ireland 92, November.
- Hanrahan, E.T. & Walsh, J.A. (1965). Investigation of behaviour of peat under varying conditions of stress and strain. Proceedings of the 6th International Conference on Soil Mechanics and Foundation Engineering, Montreal.
- Hanrahan, E.T. (1967). The fallacy of plain strain in consolidation. Civil Engineering Public Works Review, June.
- Hanrahan, E.T. (1968). Analysing strain in real solids. Civil Engineering Public Works Review, March.
- Hanrahan, E.T. (1985). The geotechnics of real materials: the Eg, Ek method. Elsevier. ISBN 0-444-42470-9.
