= Marie Henri Mackenzie =

Dutch artist

- Self portrait (1935)
- Born: 3 August 1878; Rotterdam, Netherlands
- Died: 30 December 1961 (aged 83); Hilversum, Netherlands
- Known for: Painting

Marie Henri Mackenzie (August 3, 1878 in Rotterdam – December 30, 1961 in Hilversum) was a Dutch painter. He was a student of the Art Academy in Rotterdam and later on of the famous Dutch impressionist painter George Hendrik Breitner in Amsterdam. Mackenzie's brother-in-law was the Dutch athlete and ice skates manufacturer Hendrikus Jacobus Gorter.

== Early life ==
Marie Henri Mackenzie was born in the port city of Rotterdam, the Netherlands on 3 August 1878. His father Paulus Mackenzie (1852–1919) was a coffee and tea trader in Rotterdam who married Maria Johanna Reugers (1847–1882), from The Hague. Marie had one sister, Elizabeth Maria Christina Mackenzie (1879–1969). Marie’s mother Maria died at the age of 34, when Marie was three years old. His father Paulus remarried five years later with Susanna Alida Riegen.

After primary school Mackenzie went to the trade school and went on to have an office job. However, his passion for art meant that, with help from his father, he decided to attend the Art Academy in Rotterdam from 1898–1899. One of his teachers was the Dutch painter Pieter Adrianus Schipperus (1840–1929).

After a year and a half, Mackenzie left art school and, for financial reasons, went back to a regular job in 1899. He worked for the American Standard Oil Company and was sent to work in Russia, Germany, England (London), Scotland and Azerbaijan.

In 1905 Mackenzie moved to Amsterdam. In 1910 he married Jeanette Betsy Cato van Linschooten. They lived at the Admiraal de Ruyterweg in Amsterdam until 1931 and had two children: daughter Johanna Jeanette Paula and son William.

== Professional career ==
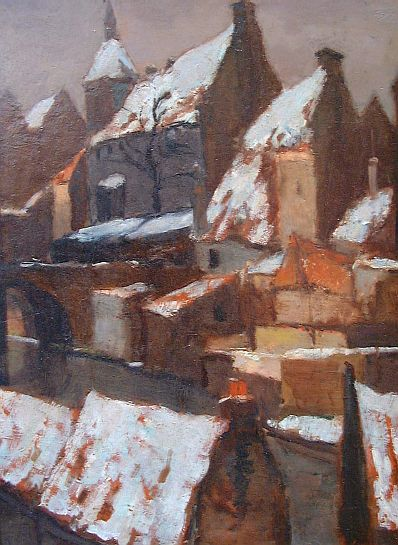
'Amersfoort'. View of the church of Amersfoort. M.H. Mackenzie. Oil on canvas, 58 x 44 cm.

Mackenzie became well known for his impressionist cityscapes of Amsterdam. In 1925 his work was included in an exhibition at the Stedelijk Museum Amsterdam, among paintings from Pablo Picasso and others.

His work was, particularly early in his career, influenced by the Dutch painter George Hendrik Breitner (1857–1923). They were friends and Breitner probably provided advice and guidance to Mackenzie. Both artists used photography to base their paintings on.

Some critics argued that Mackenzie’s early work was often a copy Breitner’s style. Many of his paintings were unintentionally mistaken for, and also deliberately forged and sold as Breitner’s work, which was an ongoing frustration for Mackenzie.

The family moved to the Dutch city of Hilversum in 1931, after Mackenzie lost his job in the petroleum industry due to the great depression. Mackenzie completely devoted himself after 1931 to painting. He then was at the age of 43 years. Art became his main source of income, including during World War II, and he often paid for services and goods with paintings, such as his dental treatments.

Mackenzie was a painter of landscapes, figures, portraits, harbour views and urban life in cities such as Amsterdam, Hilversum, Amersfoort, Rotterdam, Paris, London, Brussels and Bruges.

He retained a fondness for Amsterdam throughout his life and often went back to the city to sketch, even after he had moved to Hilversum. He also regularly visited the city of Amersfoort. The old city centre must have been inspiring for Mackenzie. His visits resulted in a number of drawings and paintings with which he attracted the attention of critics in and outside Amersfoort.

Just as in his Amsterdam cityscapes, Mackenzie focused on the canals and the historical buildings in Amersfoort. However, the style of his Amersfoort works differed from that of his earlier Amsterdam work. During the time that Mackenzie came to Amersfoort he began to distance himself from Breitner's influence. While his earlier work was often thought to resemble that of Breitner, his later work increasingly had a character of its own.

Mackenzie's work was included in the 1939 exhibition and sale Onze Kunst van Heden (Our Art of Today) at the Rijksmuseum in Amsterdam.

Mackenzie was the uncle of Dutch painter Jan Korthals, who under his influence became the 'last Amsterdam impressionist'. Painters such as Dick van Vlaardingen were strongly influenced by Mackenzie.

The artist died in Hilversum on 30 December 1961. He was buried at the Noorderbegraafplaats, Hilversum.

His work can be found in Museum Hilversum, Museum Flehite in Amersfoort and the Rijkscollectie (Governmental collection of the Netherlands).
