= H. J. Gorter =

Dutch cyclist, speed skater and ice skates manufacturer from Zwolle

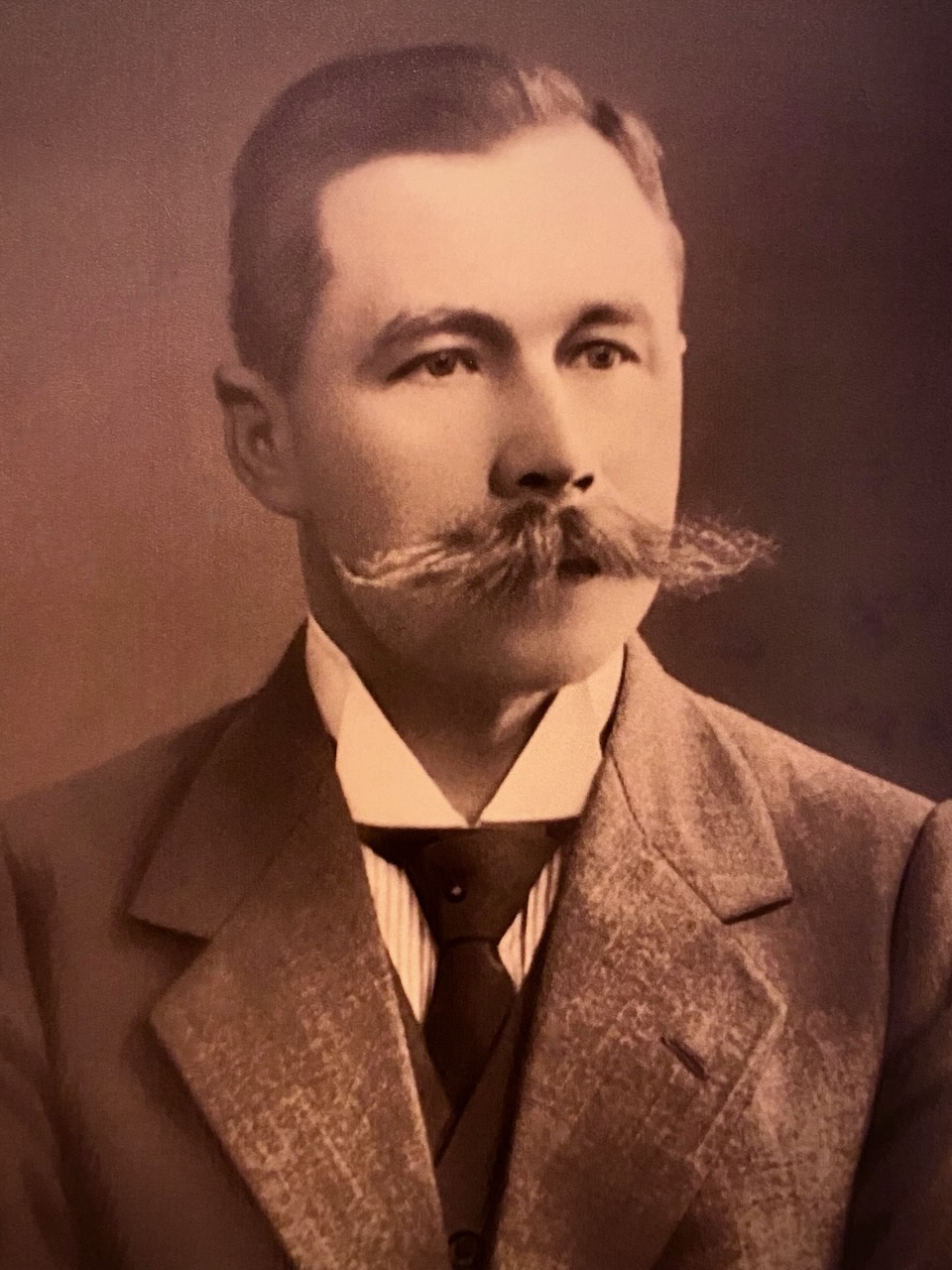
- Born: Hendrikus Jacobus Gorter; 19 June 1874; Zwolle, the Netherlands
- Died: 13 September 1918 (aged 44); Amsterdam, the Netherlands
- Other names: 'Henri'
- Occupations: Dutch cycling champion, speed skater and ice skates manufacturer
- Known for: Cycling, 'Hercules' ice skates manufacturing factory, Zwolle
- Spouse(s): Elisabeth Mackenzie, Christina Hendriksen

Hendrikus Jacobus Gorter (1874–1918) was a Dutch cyclist, speed skater and ice skates manufacturer from Zwolle. He died in the 1918 Weesp train disaster.

== Early life ==
Hendrikus Gorter grew up in Zwolle, Overijssel, in the eastern part of the Netherlands. His father Jacob Gorter (1834-1875) was a bookseller at Hoogstraten & Gorter in Zwolle. The Gorter family came from Friesland. Jacob was a son of Durk Jans Gorter and Hendrica Posthuma, and born in Harlingen. Hendrikus' mother Henrietta Muller (1847-1937), was born in Utrecht, and a daughter of Michiel Muller and Henrietta Buys. Hendrikus' parents married in Utrecht in 1872. Their first son died shortly after birth. Hendrikus, their second son, was born in Zwolle on 19 June 1874. Not long after, in March 1875, Hendrikus' father died.

Hendrikus, colloquially known as 'Henri', attended the state high school in Zwolle. In 1890 he was admitted to the Machinist College at the Plantage Muidergracht in Amsterdam, where he was taught metalworking, forging and other technical skills. He did not finish the school and in 1892 he moved from Amsterdam to Utrecht, the birth place of his mother. His passions included ice skating and cycling and he enjoyed participating in competitions. In 1892 he competed on a Simplex bicycle manufactured by the Automatic Machine Company in Utrecht. After six months in Utrecht, Henri moved back to Zwolle in October 1892.

== Cycling career ==
It is likely that Henri started cycling at a young age. He is pictured with a British Rudge solid bicycle in 1889, at the age of fifteen.

While living in Amsterdam he became a member of the local cycle club. In the following years he participated in competitions across the country and became a member of several cycling clubs, including in Zwolle and Rotterdam. In 1891 he finished in second place on the track in Arnhem. In the following years he won many races including in Amsterdam, Scheveningen, Sittard and Antwerp.

In 1896, Henri became Dutch track cycling champion in the English mile, five kilometres and ten kilometres categories. One of his main competitors was cyclist and speed ice skater Jaap Eden (1873-1925). During one of the last races of his career, the Grand Prix of Amsterdam on 16 August 1898, Henri finished in the second place after Guus Schilling, and Jaap Eden came third.

== Ice skates manufacturing ==
Henri participated in several Dutch ice skating competitions and, although he wasn't as successful as on the bicycle, he earned silver and bronze medals in the winter of 1884-1895.

In 1895 he opened one of the first machine-driven ice skates manufacturing plants in the Netherlands. The ice skates factory was located at Thomas à Kempisstraat 157 in Zwolle. Initially, the main products were nordic skates with attached boots, used for tour skating and speed skating.

An eight horsepower steam engine and boiler were installed to drive the manufacturing machinery. The factory was named 'Hercules'. Eventually Henri began producing a wide range of ice skates, often with beech wood platforms attached to metal blades (or 'runners'), including the Wichers-de Salis skates, Queens skates and Go-ahead skates. In February 1895, ice skater Ype Rodenhuis from Harlingen, set the 25 kilometer world record on Gorter ice skates.

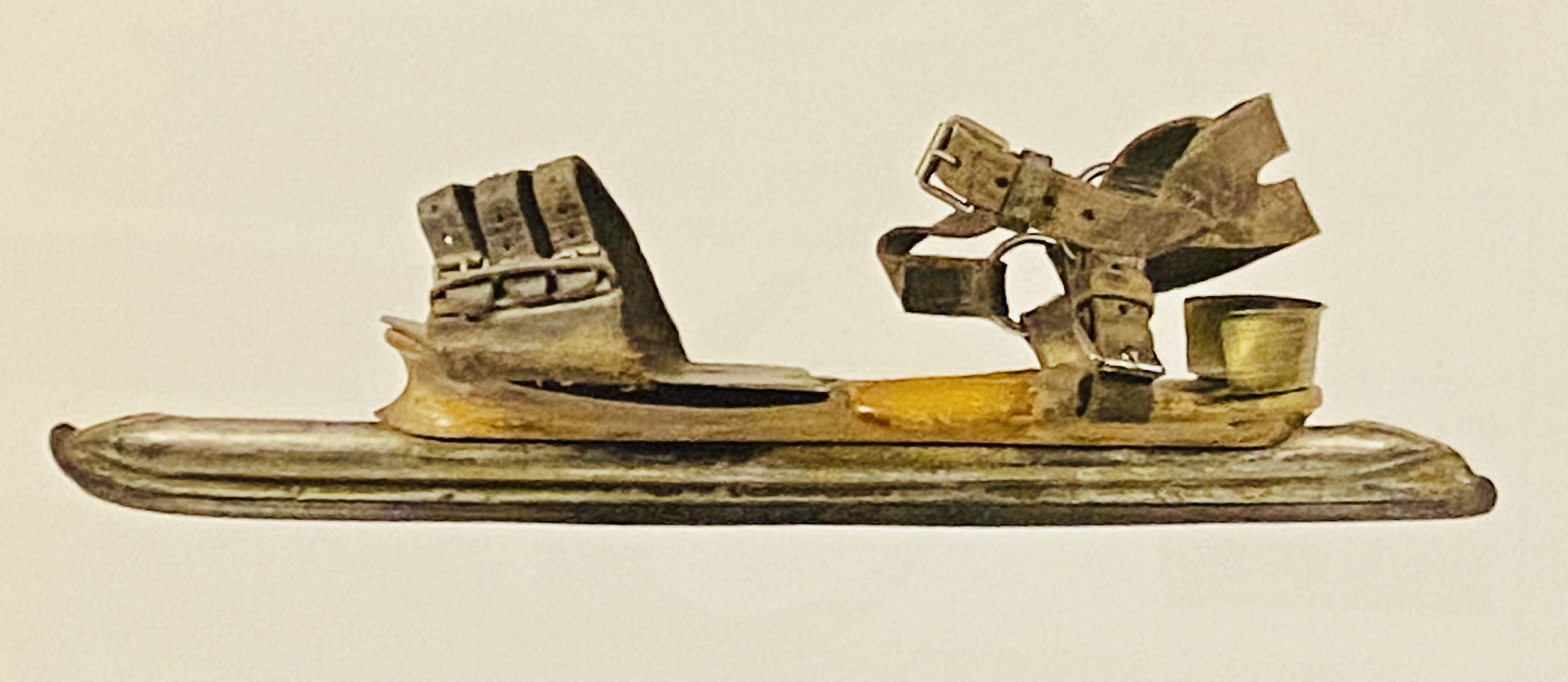
The Rodenhuis-Kingma skates (1896). Source: H.J. Gorter, Zwolle 1874-1918. Aad van den Ouweelen en Frits Locher. De poolster, 2018.

In 1896, Henri developed a new model, called the Rodenhuis-Kingma skates, in collaboration with Ype Rodenhuis and sprinter Marten Kingma, although it is unclear if this design was originally from the Hercules factory. Another new model were his Duplex skates with detachable, multifunctional blades. In the twentieth century, Gorter ice skates became collector's items. From 1897, Henri also produced Pierce bicycles in his factory, and eventually sold a wide range of brands in 'Gorter's sport store' in the Diezenstraat, Zwolle.

Around the turn of the century the Dutch winters were mild, which meant less frozen waterways to skate on. Sales went down and the ice skates manufacturing industry went through a recession. In 1906, he had to let go of twenty workers. The factory was put up for sale in February 1907 and the doors finally closed in the same year.

== Marriage and divorce ==
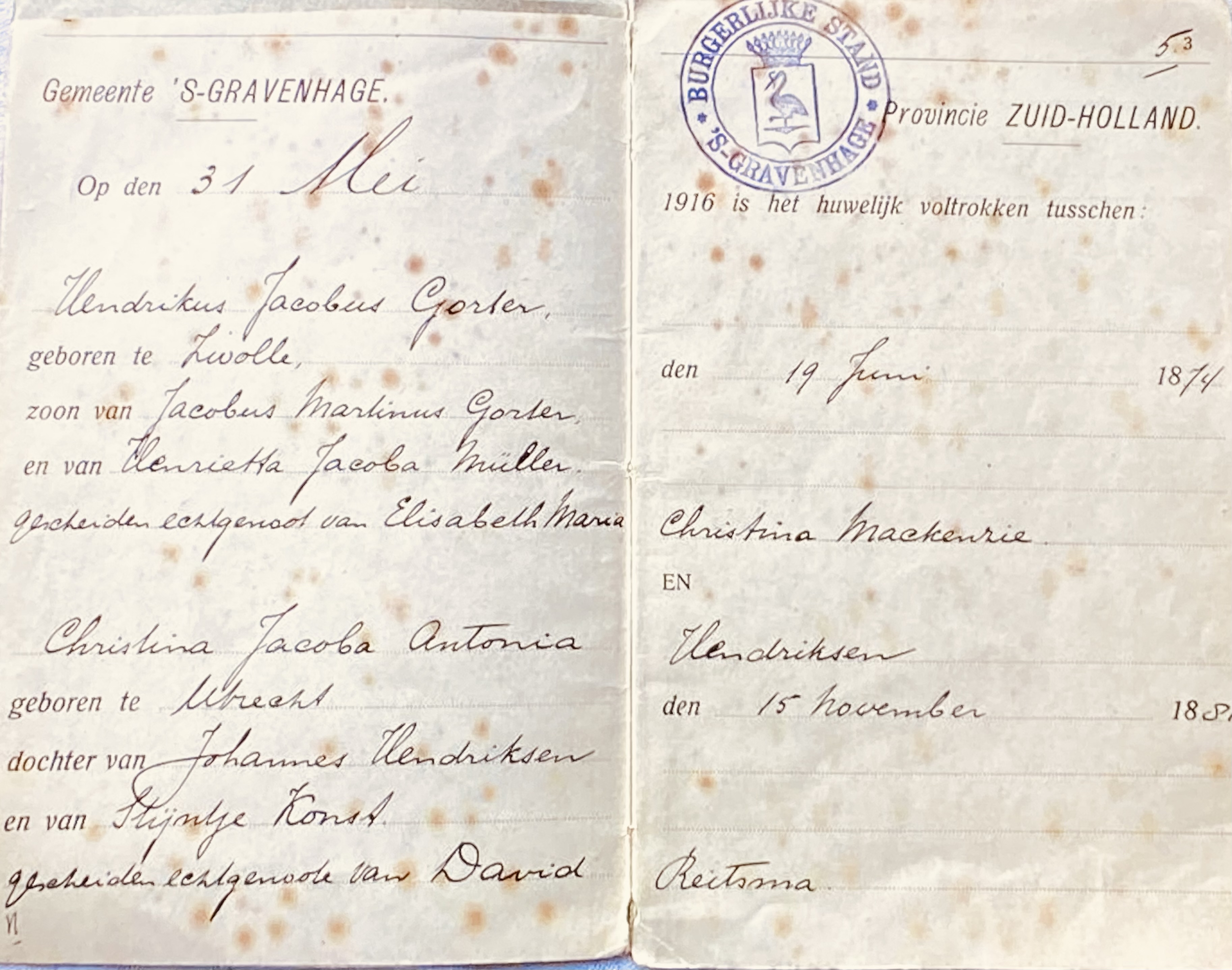
Marriage certificate of Hendrikus Gorter and Christina Hendriksen (1916).

On 22 May 1902 Henri married Elisabeth Mackenzie (1879-1969), daughter of Paulus Mackenzie and Maria Reugers. Elisbeth's father Paulus was a coffee and tea trader from Rotterdam. Her brother was a well-known Dutch painter, Marie Henry Mackenzie. Henri and Elisabeth had two sons, Henri Martinus Gorter, born in 1907, and Paulus Gorter, born in 1910. In 1910 the family moved to Apeldoorn.

In 1905, Henri became board member of the Dutch motor vehicle association (Dutch: Nederlandsche Motorwielrijders Vereeniging), which was awarded the predicate 'Royal' in 1916. He organised races and day trips for members, and later became vice-president of the organisation until his death in 1918.

From 1908 he worked as representative for the cash register firm Cord and Van Erk in Amsterdam. In 1915 Henri and Elisabeth divorced. He remarried a year later, on 31 May 1916 in The Hague, with Christina Hendriksen (1881-1939), daughter of Johannes Hendriksen and Stijntje Konst. In 1918 Henri and Christina had a son, Christiaan Gorter.

== Weesp train disaster ==
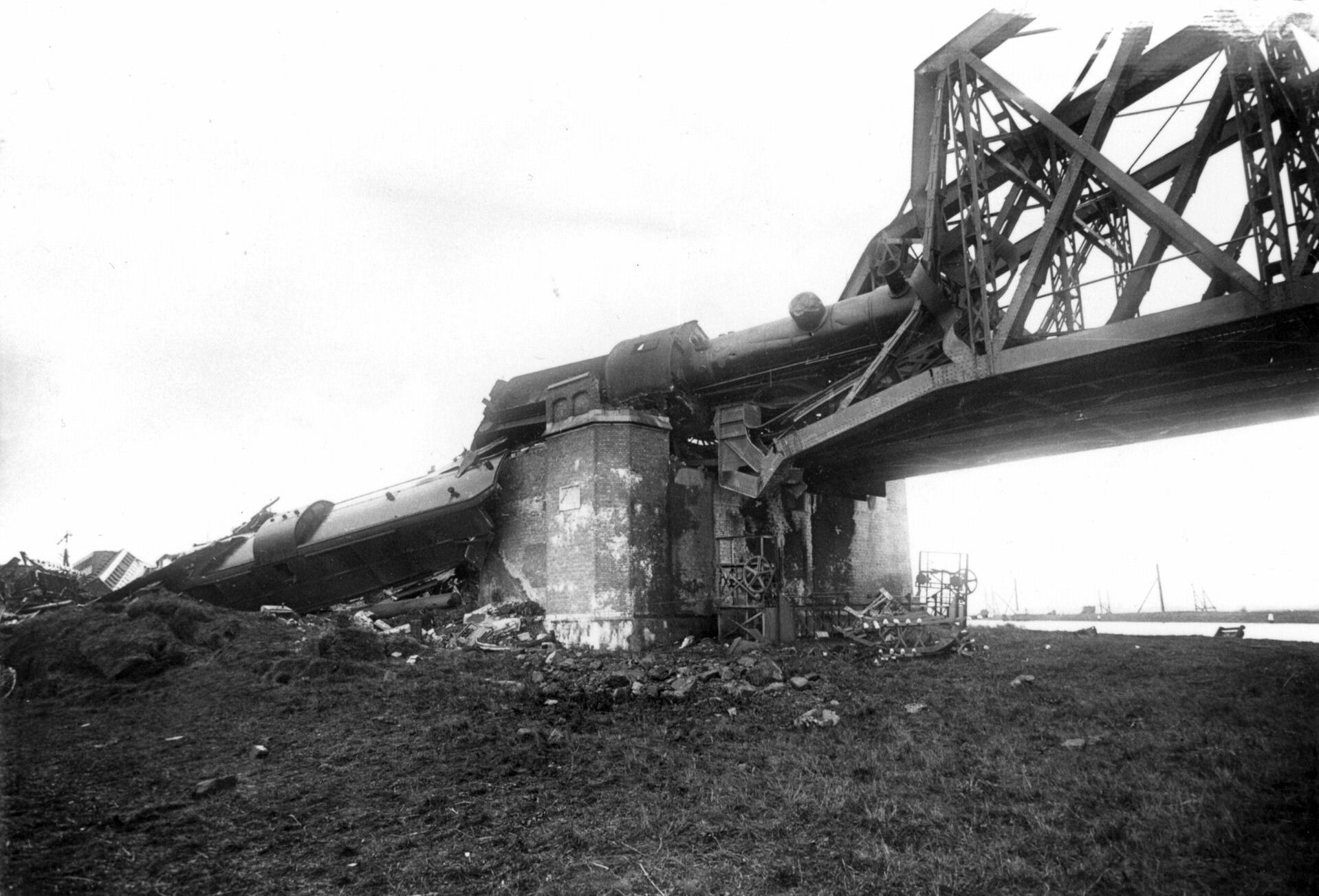
On 13 September 1918, Hendrikus Gorter died during the Weesp train disaster.

On the morning of 13 September 1918, Henri took the train from Apeldoorn to Amsterdam. At the railway bridge over the Merwede canal (now Amsterdam-Rhine Canal) near Weesp, the train derailed when an embankment collapsed over a length of 95 metres due to prolonged rainfall and a poor construction. The locomotive tipped on the bridge and the wooden carriages dropped off the bank. At the Weesp train disaster, 41 people died and 42 were injured. Henri was brought to the Binnengasthuis hospital in Amsterdam and died around nine o'clock that evening. He was 44 years old.

Hendrikus Jacobus left behind his wife Christina and 7-month old son, and two sons from his first marriage. He was buried at the Soerenseweg cemetery in Apeldoorn.
