= Hachirōgata =

Lake in Akita prefecture, Japan

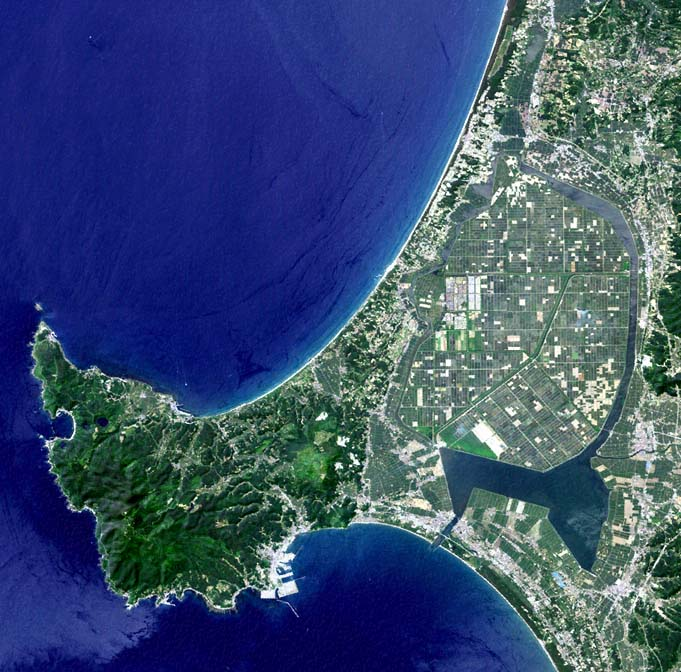
- Satellite image of Hachirōgata (at right). The lake is entirely reclaimed except the south-east corner and the narrow watercourse surrounding the reclaimed land. Oga Peninsula is in the left.

- Location within Japan
- Location: Akita Prefecture
- Coordinates: 39°54′50″N 140°01′15″E
- Type: lake
- Basin countries: Japan
- Surface area: 48.3 km^{2} (18.6 sq mi)
- Surface elevation: −4 m (−13 ft)

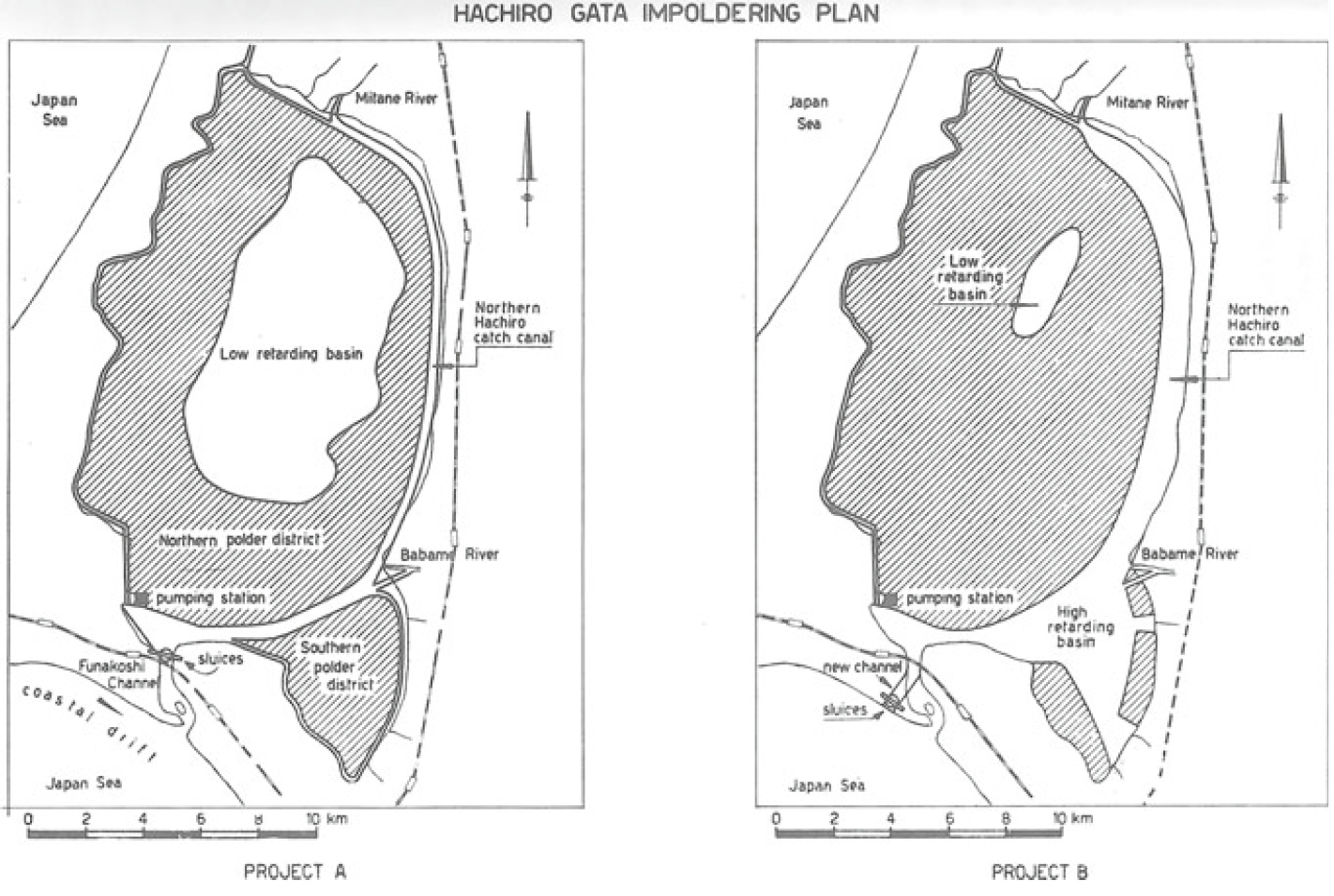
Plans for the creation of the lagoon designed by Pieter Philippus Jansen

Hachirōgata or Hachirō Lagoon (八郎潟, Hachirō-gata) is a lake in Akita Prefecture in northern Japan. Its formal name is Lake Hachirō (八郎湖, Hachirō-ko), but it is also called Hachirōgata Regulating Pond (八郎潟調整池, Hachirō-gata chōseichi). At 4 meters below sea level, Hachirōgata is the lowest natural point in Japan.

Hachirōgata was the second-largest lake in Japan after Lake Biwa. Extensive reclamation began in 1957 for crop production, and Ōgata village was established on the reclaimed land on October 1, 1964. The remaining lake has an area of 48.3 km^{2} (19 sq mi) (18th largest in Japan).

Some regard the reclamation as a mistake, since Japan began to be bothered with surplus rice soon after the completion of the reclamation. Others lament the loss of the wetlands.

Fishery of shijimi shells (Corbicula japonica) was a thriving industry, but it decreased as the lake became less brackish. In the winter, people fish wakasagi (Hypomesus nipponensis) by hollowing out the frozen surface. Today, black bass fishing attracts tourists even outside the prefecture, though some suspect that indigenous species are threatened by the invasion of the extraneous fish.

== Legend ==
According to a legend, a man called Hachirō was transformed into a dragon and chose the lake for his home after wandering a long time. Thus, the lake was named Hachirō-gata (-gata means "lagoon"). Later, he was attracted to a woman who owned Lake Tazawa, another lake in Akita Prefecture, and moved to be with her. After that, Hachirōgata became increasingly shallower.
