= Weesp train disaster =

1918 train disaster near Weesp, Netherlands

Coordinates: 52°19′28″N 5°01′06″E

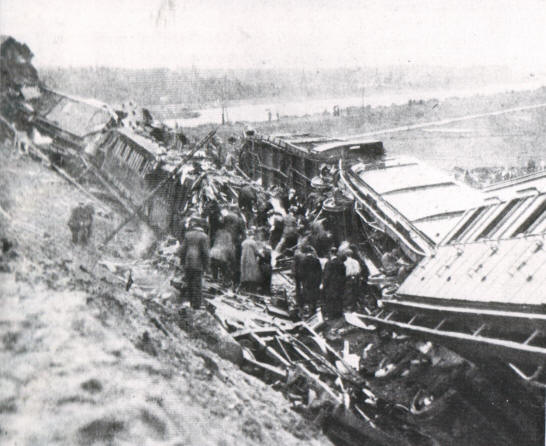
- Damage after the Weesp train disaster

- Location within Netherlands

Details
- Date: 13 September 1918
- Location: Weesp, Netherlands
- Country: Netherlands
- Line: Amsterdam–Zutphen railway
- Operator: Hollandsche IJzeren Spoorweg-Maatschappij
- Incident type: Derailment
- Cause: Embankment collapse

Statistics
- Trains: 1
- Deaths: 41
- Injured: 42

The Weesp train disaster took place on 13 September 1918 near Weesp, Netherlands. With 41 deaths and 42 injuries, it was the largest train disaster in Dutch railway history until the 1962 Harmelen train disaster.

The 102 train from Amersfoort to Amsterdam derailed near the railway bridge over the Merwedekanaal near Weesp and dropped off the bank. Various wooden carriages were splintered, causing many casualties.

== Composition ==
The train was composed of two parts; the front carriages came from Zwolle and the rear ones from Enschede. In Hilversum another carriage was hooked on, making a total of 11 carriages, which were pulled by the locomotive HSM 520. The departure time was 9:46 from Amersfoort and 10:10 from Hilversum. According to the schedule the train should have arrived in Amsterdam at 10:40.

== Derailment ==
While ascending the slope of Weesp station towards the bridge over the Merwedekanaal the dike subsided over a length of 95 metres. This was caused by extensive rain in the preceding time and the poor state of repair of the railway dike. At the moment of the subsidence the locomotive was already on the bridge and thus entangled in the ironworks of the bridge construction. The locomotive and tender flipped to the right. The tender lay on the bridgehead, a luggage wagon next to it came to a standstill against the bridgehead. The following three carriages slid off the slope and smashed into each other. The wooden upperside was largely splintered, causing the most casualties. The third carriage was also engulfed by the luggage carriage on the rear and a postal carriage, which because of the speed partially ended up next to the forward carriages. The carriage behind the postal carriage ended up skewed down from the slope, but was barely damaged. The rear carriages of the train derailed but remained on the tracks.

== Emergency aid ==
The disaster happened at 10:25. Two minutes before a train from Amsterdam to Hilversum passed. The station chief of Weesp station sounded the alarm at 10:45. A surgeon who happened to be on the train took care of first aid, soon assisted by two doctors rushed in from Weesp. Four nuns also gave aid, as well as soldiers who happened to be in the neighbourhood. There were no victims among the train crew, who also helped shortly after the disaster.

At 11:40 the first aid train arrived from Naarden-Bussum followed by accident carriages and carriages for transporting injured from Amsterdam. After that a Red Cross train arrived. At 12:40 the first injured and non-injured passengers were able to leave for Amsterdam. About 2 1/2 hours after the disaster the first injured arrived on an aid train at Muiderpoort station in Amsterdam and were transferred to the Onze Lieve Vrouwe Gasthuis hospital. Two ships which were sailing on the Merwedekanaal were stopped and they transported injured to the Binnengasthuis in Amsterdam. At 13:30 a tug left with two ships and 36 injured for Amsterdam; half an hour later a ship carrying 32 corpses followed, which arrived at the Wilhelmina Gasthuis at 16:00. One of the victims was Henri Gorter, a Dutch cyclist, speed skater and ice skates manufacturer from Zwolle. He died that evening in the Binnengasthuis.

== Rerouting of train traffic ==
The trains between Amsterdam and Amersfoort were temporarily rerouted through Breukelen and Utrecht. For commuter traffic there were several trains from Naarden-Bussum through Hilversum and Utrecht to Amsterdam. Six days after the disaster, rail traffic resumed over one track with a maximum speed of five km/h. After the bridge and dike were repaired both tracks were fully available again on 2 December.

== Investigation ==
The day after the disaster an investigative commission was instituted under the chairmanship of minister Lely. The investigation concluded that the embankment had been soaked by a prolonged period of rainfall. This was aggravated by the structure of the dike which featured impenetrable layers that the water could not escape through. Also the percolation water from the Merwedekanaal seeped through the loam dikes. The ground water level in the railway dike had therefore risen above ground level. As a result of the passing of the train the embankment vibrated and the more or less liquified dike collapsed and was shoved aside.

The disaster instigated the founding of the Laboratorium voor Grondmechanica at the Technische Hogeschool in Delft, and expedited the soil mechanics work of Albert Sybrandus Keverling Buisman.

== Later train accident near Weesp ==
On 19 June 1953, two passenger trains collided near Weesp, causing at least two deaths.
