= Géotechnique =

Academic journal of geotechnical engineering

- Discipline: Geotechnical engineering, soil mechanics, engineering geology
- Language: English
- Edited by: Lidija Zdravkovic

Publication details
- History: 1948–present
- Publisher: Emerald Group Publishing on behalf of the Institution of Civil Engineers
- Frequency: Monthly
- Open access: Hybrid
- Impact factor: 4.2 (2023)

Standard abbreviations
- ISO 4: Géotechnique

Indexing
- ISSN: 0016-8505 (print); 1751-7656 (web)
- LCCN: gs49000042
- OCLC no.: 66719380

Links
- Journal homepage; Online access; Online archive; Journal page at publisher's website

Géotechnique is a monthly peer-reviewed academic journal covering geotechnical engineering, including soil mechanics, rock mechanics, environmental geotechnics, and engineering geology. It was established in 1948 and is published by Emerald Group Publishing on behalf of the Institution of Civil Engineers.

== History ==
The idea for the journal was first mooted in 1946 during an international effort to foster post-war collaboration in geotechnical research. The journal's creation was inextricably linked to preparations for the Second International Conference on Soil Mechanics and Foundation Engineering, held in Rotterdam in 1948.

The discussions that led to the founding of Géotechnique involved a group of British soil mechanics pioneers during and shortly after their tour of European laboratories starting in late 1946, and included Rudolph Glossop, Hugh Golder, Bill Ward, and D.J. Maclean.

The journal's founders were prominent engineers and researchers whose work had already contributed significantly to the development of geotechnical science. Their diverse backgrounds and achievements reflected the interdisciplinary approach that the journal sought to promote, combining engineering, geology, and experimental methods. The founders were the following engineers:

- Leonard Cooling
- Jean-Pierre Daxelhofer
- Edward E. De Beer
- Jacques Florentin
- Emmericus Geuze
- Rudolph Glossop
- Hugh Golder
- Robert Haefeli
- Alec Skempton
- Armin von Moos
- William Hallam Ward

== Abstracting and indexing ==
The journal is abstracted and indexed in:

- Current Contents/Engineering, Computing & Technology
- EBSCO databases
- Ei Compendex
- GEOBASE
- Inspec
- ProQuest databases
- Science Citation Index Expanded
- Scopus

According to the Journal Citation Reports, the journal has a 2023 impact factor of 4.2.

Géotechnique Letters
- Discipline: Geotechnical engineering, soil mechanics, engineering geology
- Language: English
- Edited by: G. Buscarnera

Publication details
- History: 2011–present
- Publisher: Emerald Group Publishing on behalf of the Institution of Civil Engineers
- Frequency: Quarterly
- Open access: Hybrid
- Impact factor: 1.5 (2023)

Standard abbreviations
- ISO 4: Géotech. Lett.

Indexing
- ISSN: 2045-2543
- OCLC no.: 777995089

Links
- Journal homepage; Online access

== Awards ==
Each year, the authors of the paper rated best by the editorial board are awarded the Geotechnical Research Medal. In addition, the Rankine Lecture, hosted in March of each year by the British Geotechnical Association, is published in the journal.

== Géotechnique Letters ==
A companion journal, Géotechnique Letters, was established in 2011. It is an exclusively online peer-reviewed journal, specialising in the rapid dissemination of research and developments in geotechnical engineering using an expedited publication process, with papers limited to 2,000 words of main text. It is abstracted and indexed in the Science Citation Index Expanded, Current Contents/Engineering, Computing & Technology Scopus, Ei Compendex, Inspec, and Geobase. According to the Journal Citation Reports, the journal has a 2023 impact factor of 1.5.
