= Rudolph Glossop =

British geotechnical engineer

Rudolph Glossop FGS FICE
- Born: 17 February 1902; Bakewell, Derbyshire, England
- Died: 1 March 1993 (aged 91); Cornwall, England
- Education: Royal School of Mines; Imperial College London
- Known for: Establishing Géotechnique; Founder of Soil Mechanics Ltd; Contributions to Engineering geology
- Awards: George Stephenson Medal
- Scientific career
- Fields: Geotechnical engineering Engineering geology Soil mechanics
- Workplaces: Soil Mechanics Ltd. Imperial College London; University of Birmingham; John Mowlem & Co.

Rudolph "Silas" Glossop (17 February 1902 – 1 March 1993) was a British geotechnical engineer and mining engineer notable for his contributions to the field of engineering geology and soil mechanics. He was instrumental in founding Soil Mechanics Ltd. and the establishment of the peer-reviewed journal, Géotechnique. The Glossop Lecture at the Geological Society is named after him.

== Early life and education ==
Glossop was born in Bakewell into a family with a long-standing presence in the area. He received his education at Cheltenham College before attending the Royal School of Mines at Imperial College London, where he graduated in 1924. During his student years, he founded an arts and humanities library at the college, which later became the Haldane Library. It was whilst at college he was first given the nickname ‘Silas’ after Silas Q. Porter, the absent-minded professor from the novel Tarzan of the Apes. He retained the name throughout his life.

== Career ==
After graduation, he initially worked as a mining engineer in Canada followed by a stint as a lecturer at the University of Birmingham, before returning to Canada in 1929. His career path then took him to Mexico and subsequently to John Mowlem & Co Ltd in 1930 as an assistant engineer. During the mid-1930s recession, he worked overseas as a mine manager in the Gold Coast.

In 1937, Glossop shifted his focus to geotechnical engineering. He played a key role in the investigation of a failure in an earth dam for a new Metropolitan Water Board reservoir at Chingford being constructed by Mowlem. He set up a small laboratory on site, extending its operations to other Mowlem contracts.

His proficiency in soil mechanics grew rapidly, inspired by his interactions with the Building Research Station group which included notable engineers such as Alec Skempton (Glossop & Skempton, 1945), Leonard Cooling, and George Meyerhof, as well as the renowned soil mechanics engineer Karl von Terzaghi.

In 1940, Glossop was tasked with overseeing the construction of an RAF airfield in Hampshire and later, in 1942, a similar project in Leiston. Despite these new responsibilities, he continued his involvement with the Chingford project. He established a makeshift laboratory at Leiston, transferring equipment and personnel. This period marked significant advancements in soil mechanics, aided by his collaboration with Hugh Golder.

In November 1943, Glossop co-founded Soil Mechanics Ltd in a flat in Victoria Street, London. This venture, initiated with Golder and Harold Harding, became the first commercial geotechnical laboratory in England. The newly formed company initially served as a service provider to Mowlem's contracts, however the business areas soon expanded into work for other contractors, leading to its growth and the eventual establishment of a separate office, Glossop House, in Wokingham.

== Teaching, publications, and awards ==
In 1945, he was among the authors of a series of four lectures on soil mechanics organized by the Institution of Civil Engineers, along with Leonard Cooling, Alec Skempton and A.H.D. Marwick. He played a pivotal role in the launch of the journal Géotechnique in 1948, after initial discussions at a meeting in a nightclub in The Hague with E.C.W.A Geuze and Hugh Golder in 1946.(Cooling et al., 1975) Glossop's involvement extended to covering the journal's initial printing costs from his own funds. He served on its editorial board for 20 years.

His academic contributions are highlighted by his papers on the history of rock and alluvial grouting (Glossop, 1960;1961), and on the early use of compressed air by Jules Triger for the construction of shafts and tunnels (Glossop, 1980).

Glossop was a key figure in organizing the Fourth International Conference of the International Society for Soil Mechanics and Foundation Engineering in 1956 - 57 (Glossop, 1968), served as chair of the Federation of Civil Engineering Contractors in 1963-64, and served as Vice-President of the Geological Society in 1969. His contributions were recognized through numerous awards, including the George Stephenson Medal.

== Bibliography ==
- Glossop, R.; Skempton, A.W. (1945). "Particle size in silts and sands". Journal of the Institution of Civil Engineers. 25 (2): 81–105.
- Glossop, R. (1960). "The Invention and Development of Injection Processes Part I: 1902–1850". Géotechnique. 10 (3): 91–100.
- Glossop, R. (1961). "The Invention and Development of Injection Processes Part II: 1850–1960". Géotechnique. 11 (4): 255–279.
- Glossop, R. (1968). "The Rise of Geotechnology and its Influence on Engineering Practice". Géotechnique. 18 (2): 107–150.
- Cooling, L.F.; Skempton, A.W.; Glossop, R.; Golder, H.Q. (1975). "British Geotechnical Society Twenty-fifth Anniversary Report". Géotechnique. 25 (4): 646–653.
- Glossop, R. (1980). "Jules Triger, 1801–1867". Géotechnique. 30 (4): 538–539.
