= Leonard Cooling =

British soil mechanics pioneer

Dr Leonard Frank Cooling
- Born: 23 December 1903; Solihull, England
- Died: 15 February 1977 (aged 73); Watford, England
- Education: University of Birmingham
- Known for: Founding the first UK soil mechanics laboratory 1962 Rankine Lecture (first British lecturer)
- Awards: Cooling Prize (named in his honour)
- Scientific career
- Fields: Soil mechanics Geotechnical engineering
- Workplaces: Building Research Station; Institution of Civil Engineers

Leonard Frank Cooling (23 December 1903 – 15 February 1977) was an English physicist and engineer widely regarded as the "Founder of British Soil Mechanics". He played a pivotal role in the early development of soil mechanics in the United Kingdom, establishing the first British soil mechanics laboratory at the Building Research Station (BRS) in 1934.

Cooling published widely on soil mechanics and related subjects, and was one of the five founders of the soil mechanics and geotechnical journal, Géotechnique, along with Rudolph Glossop, Alec Skempton, Hugh Golder, and Bill Ward. He served on the publication's advisory panel from its first meeting in 1949 until 1969, and was chairman from 1966 to 1969.

== Life and career ==
=== Education and early work ===
Cooling was born in Solihull on 23 December 1903. A promising student, he attended Yardley Secondary School before winning a scholarship to the University of Birmingham, where he graduated with a first-class honours degree in physics in 1925. In 1926, he obtained an MSc for research into the thermo-magnetic properties of nickel-iron and meteorites.

An accomplished athlete in his youth, Cooling played amateur football for England and West Bromwich Albion while also excelling in athletics as a Midland Counties Champion runner.

=== Building Research Station and work in soil mechanics ===
In 1927, Cooling joined the Building Research Station as a Junior Scientific Officer, where his early work focused on capillarity, evaporation, and permeability of building materials. His work led to some involvement with soil physics at Rothamsted Experimental Station, and in 1933, under the directorship of Dr Reginald Stradling, Cooling was appointed head of the newly formed Soil Physics Section at BRS.

The small team, initially housed in a converted stable block, quickly established itself as a leader in British soil mechanics, equipped to conduct tests for Atterberg limits, consolidation, and soil shear strength. Cooling's work laid the foundation for soil mechanics research in Britain, notably investigating embankment slips and retaining wall movements. By 1935, the BRS group had been renamed the Soil Mechanics Section and were active in investigations such as embankment slips on sections of the Southern Railway and retaining wall failures in the London Clay.

In 1937, Alec Skempton commenced what would become a lifetime of work in soil mechanics under Cooling at the BRS, after abandoning his studies on reinforced concrete. Skempton and Cooling published research on London Clay and in August of the same year, the failure of the Chingford Dam resulted in the first UK visit by Karl Terzaghi, who redesigned the dam in co-operation with Skempton, Cooling, and the BRS soil mechanics team after Skempton had successfully identified the rapid rate of filling of the dam by the contractor, Mowlem, as the cause of the failure.

=== International recognition ===
In 1936, Cooling was the sole UK delegate at the 1st International Conference on Soil Mechanics and Foundation Engineering in Harvard, presenting three papers. By the second conference in 1948, his efforts had catalysed a major expansion, with 74 British delegates and 57 papers presented. Cooling served as chair of the British Geotechnical Society (BGS) from 1955 to 1959, edited Géotechnique, and delivered the second Rankine Lecture in 1962. He was a prominent figure in the Soil Mechanics and Foundations Committee of the Institution of Civil Engineers, as well as the British National Committee of the International Society for Soil Mechanics and Foundation Engineering (ISSMFE), formed in 1947. He served on the committee that would later evolve into the British Geotechnical Society for many years and held the role of Chairman of the Society from 1955 to 1959. In 1957, despite his training as a physicist, he was elected an Associate of the Institution of Civil Engineers in recognition of his exceptional contributions to civil engineering.

=== Key investigations and contributions ===
Cooling's investigations and notable work included:

- Chingford Dam failure (1937), which coincided with Karl Terzaghi's visit to Britain.
- Development of the first field and laboratory methods for soil sampling and testing in Britain.
- Groundbreaking studies on soil consolidation and the influence of pore water pressure.
- He was instrumental in early embankment and foundation studies in London Clay and Essex sea defence failures after the North Sea flood of 1953.

=== Legacy and personal life ===
Cooling lived in Oxhey with his wife and daughter, and retired in 1968. He remained active in geotechnics until his death on 15 February 1977 at the Peace Memorial Hospital in Watford. The British Geotechnical Society established the Cooling Prize in 1970 to honour his commitment to young professionals, awarded annually for the best paper by a young engineer.

== Bibliography ==
- Cooling, L.F. (1930). Contributions to the study of fluorescence. II: Evaporation of water from bricks. Transactions of the British Ceramic Society. 29, pp. 39–54.
- Cooling, L.F. & Smith, D.B. (1936). Exploration of soil conditions and sampling operations. Proceedings of the First International Conference on Soil Mechanics and Foundation Engineering, Harvard. 1, p. 12.
- Cooling, L.F. & Smith, D.B. (1936). The shearing resistance of soils. Proceedings of the First International Conference on Soil Mechanics and Foundation Engineering, Harvard. 1, pp. 37–41.
- Cooling, L.F. (1936). Report on the soil mechanics laboratory of the Building Research Station. Proceedings of the First International Conference on Soil Mechanics and Foundation Engineering, Harvard. 2, pp. 12–16.
- Cooling, L.F. (1936). Report on the First International Conference on Soil Mechanics and Foundation Engineering. Journal of the Institution of Civil Engineers. 4, pp. 135–147.
- Cooling, L.F., Clements, R.G.H. et al. (1938). Examination of the sub-soil of roads. Eighth Congress of the Permanent International Association of Road Congresses. 85, pp. 1–31.
- Cooling, L.F. & Golder, H.Q. (1940). A portable apparatus for compression tests on clay soils. Engineering. 149, pp. 56–58.
- Cooling, L.F. & Skempton, A.W. (1941). Some experiments on the consolidation of clay. Journal of the Institution of Civil Engineers. 16, pp. 381–398.
- Cooling, L.F. & Skempton, A.W. (1942). A laboratory study of London Clay. Journal of the Institution of Civil Engineers. 17, pp. 251–276.
- Cooling, L.F. (1942). Soil mechanics and site exploration. Journal of the Institution of Civil Engineers. 18, pp. 37–61.
- Cooling, L.F. & Golder, H.Q. (1942). The analysis of the failure of an earth dam during construction. Journal of the Institution of Civil Engineers. 19, pp. 38–55.
- Cooling, L.F. & Ward, W.H. (1944). Damage to cold stores due to frost-heaving. Proceedings of the Institute of Refrigeration. 41, pp. 37–47.
- Cooling, L.F. (1946). Development and scope of soil mechanics. The Principles and Application of Soil Mechanics. Institution of Civil Engineers, pp. 1–30.
- Cooling, L.F. (1946). Some foundation troubles with small houses. Journal of the Institution of Sanitary Engineers. 45, pp. 327–347.
- Cooling, L.F. (1948). Settlement observations on four grain silos. Proceedings of the Second International Conference on Soil Mechanics and Foundation Engineering, Rotterdam. 2, pp. 135–138.
- Cooling, L.F. & Ward, W.H. (1948). Some examples of foundation movements due to causes other than structural loads. Proceedings of the Second International Conference on Soil Mechanics and Foundation Engineering, Rotterdam. 2, pp. 162–167.
- Cooling, L.F. (1951). The influence of pore water on soil behaviour. Chemistry and Industry. 43, pp. 892–898.
- Cooling, L.F. (1951). Some foundation problems in Great Britain. Proceedings of the Building Research Congress, London. 1, pp. 157–164.
- Cooling, L.F. & Davey, N. (1951). Review of civil engineering research at the Building Research Station. Part 2: soil mechanics. Civil Engineering and Public Works Review. 46, pp. 34–36.
- Cooling, L.F., Jones, E.E. & Pettet, A.E.J. (1952). Dewatering of sewage sludge by electro-osmosis. Water and Sanitary Engineer. 3, pp. 246–250.
- Cooling, L.F. & Ward, W.H. (1953). Measurement of loads and strains in earth-supporting structures. Proceedings of the Third International Conference on Soil Mechanics and Foundation Engineering, Zurich. 2, pp. 162–166.
- Cooling, L.F. & Marsland, A. (1953). Soil mechanics studies of failures in the sea defence banks of Essex and Kent. Proceedings of the Conference on North Sea Floods of 1953. London: Institution of Civil Engineers, pp. 58–73.
- Cooling, L.F. (1955). The measurement of pore water pressure and its application to some engineering soil problems. Symposium on Observations of Structures (Lisbon). 2, pp. 298–314.
- Cooling, L.F. & Gibson, R.E. (1955). Settlement studies on structures in England. Conference on Correlation Between Calculated and Observed Stresses and Displacement in Structures. London: Institution of Civil Engineers, pp. 295–317.
- Cooling, L.F. (1960). Water movements affecting foundations. Proceedings of the Third Australasian and New Zealand Conference on Soil Mechanics. pp. 181–186.
- Cooling, L.F. (1962). Second Rankine Lecture: Field measurement in soil mechanics. Geotechnique. 12, pp. 77–104.
- Cooling, L.F. (1968). Field measurement for design purposes and for monitoring structural performance. Proceedings of the Fourth Conference of the Australasian Road Research Board. 4, pp. 1922–1942.
- Cooling, L.F., Skempton, A.W. & Little, A.L. (1969). A Century of Soil Mechanics. London: Institution of Civil Engineers.
- Cooling, L.F. (1971). Opening address. Proceedings of the Symposium on the Interaction of Structure and Foundation. Birmingham: Midlands Soil Mechanics and Foundation Engineering Society, pp. 5–6.
- Cooling, L.F. (1974). Closing address. Symposium on Field Instrumentation in Geotechnical Engineering. London: Butterworth, pp. 708–710.
- Cooling, L.F. (1975). The early history of soil mechanics at the Building Research Station. Geotechnique. 25, pp. 629–634.

== See also ==
- Alec Skempton
