= Maastunnel =

Tunnel in Rotterdam, the Netherlands

Coordinates: 51.900°N 4.467°E

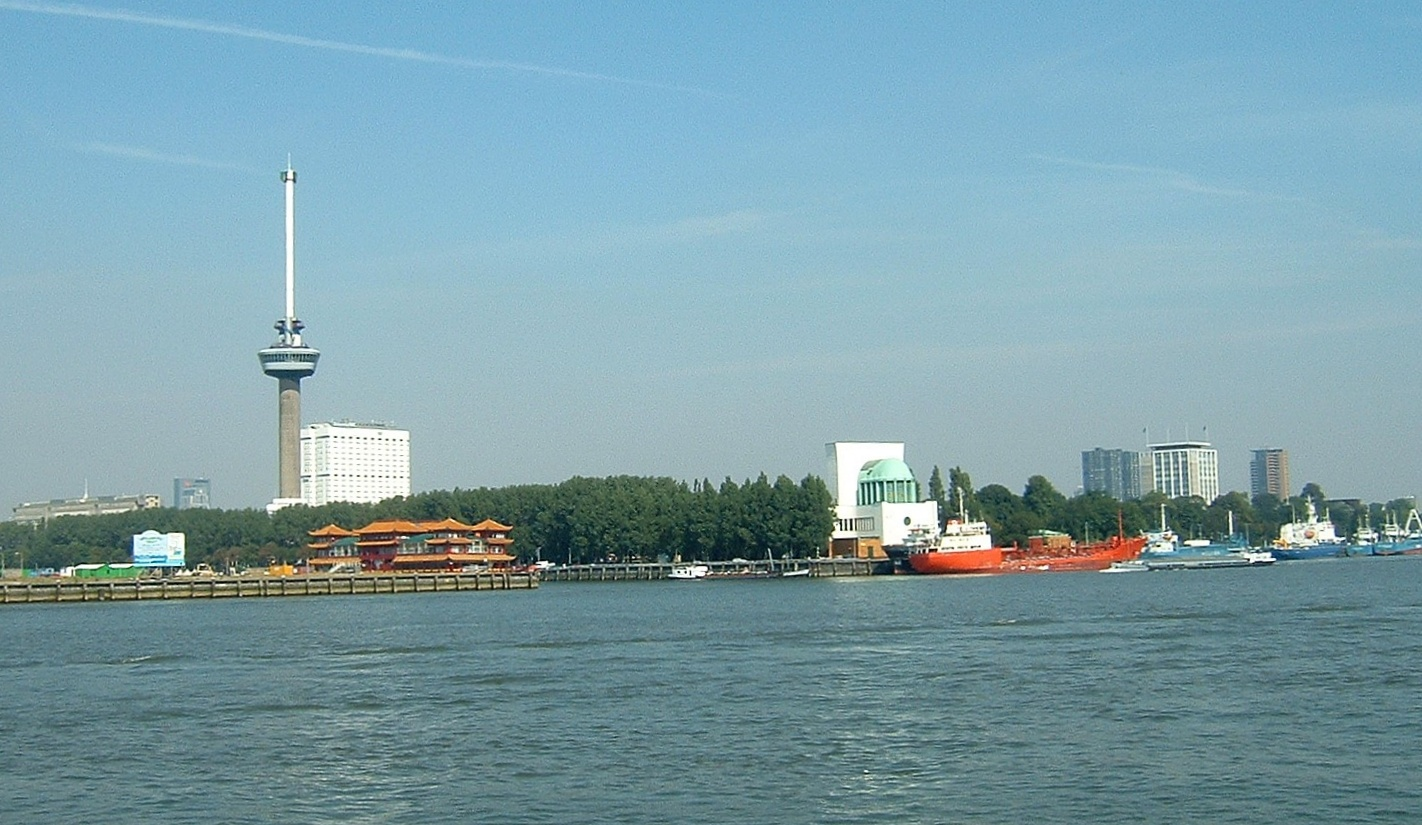
Euromast and Maastunnel ventilation (centre)

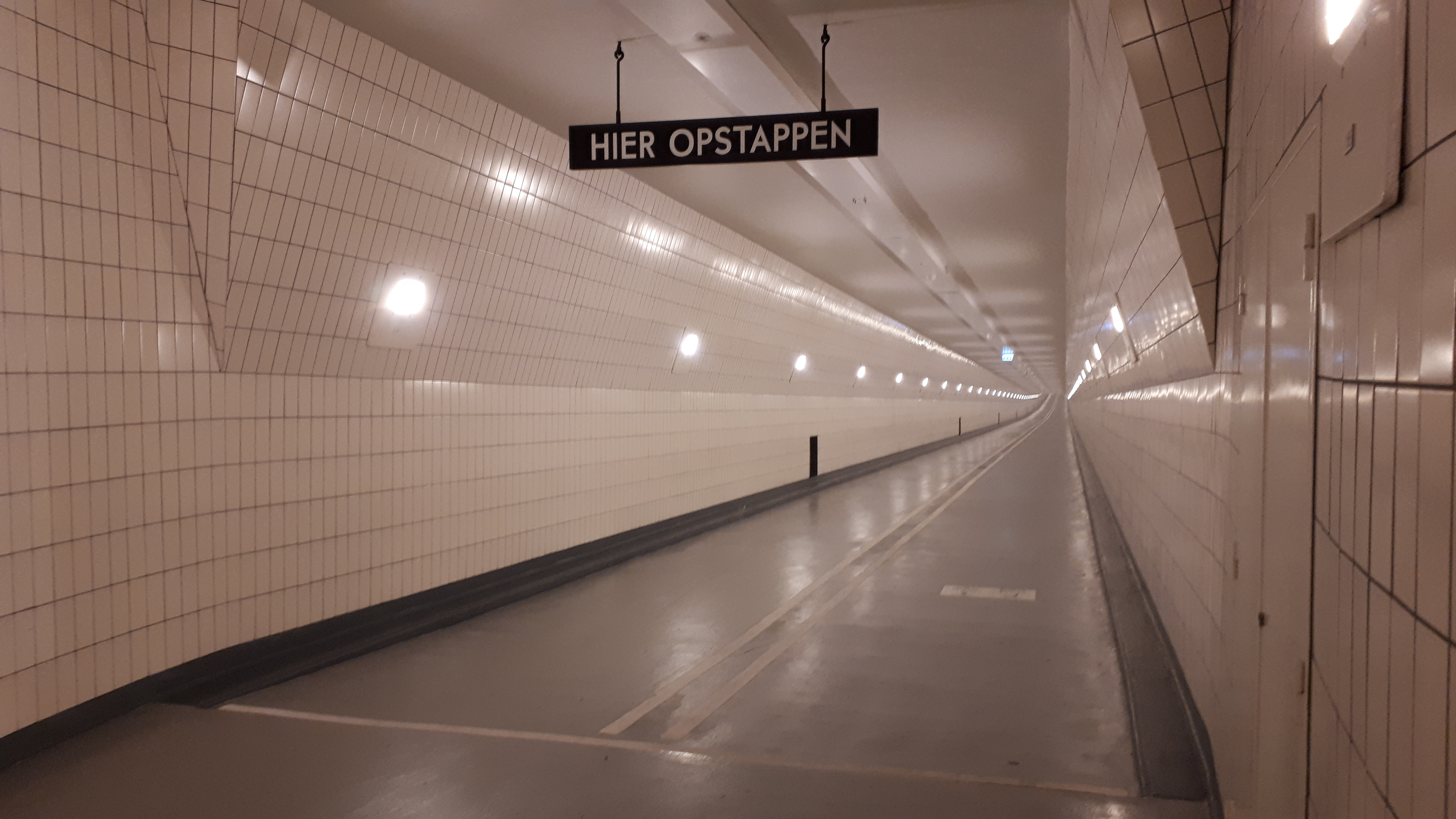
Cyclist section of the Maastunnel

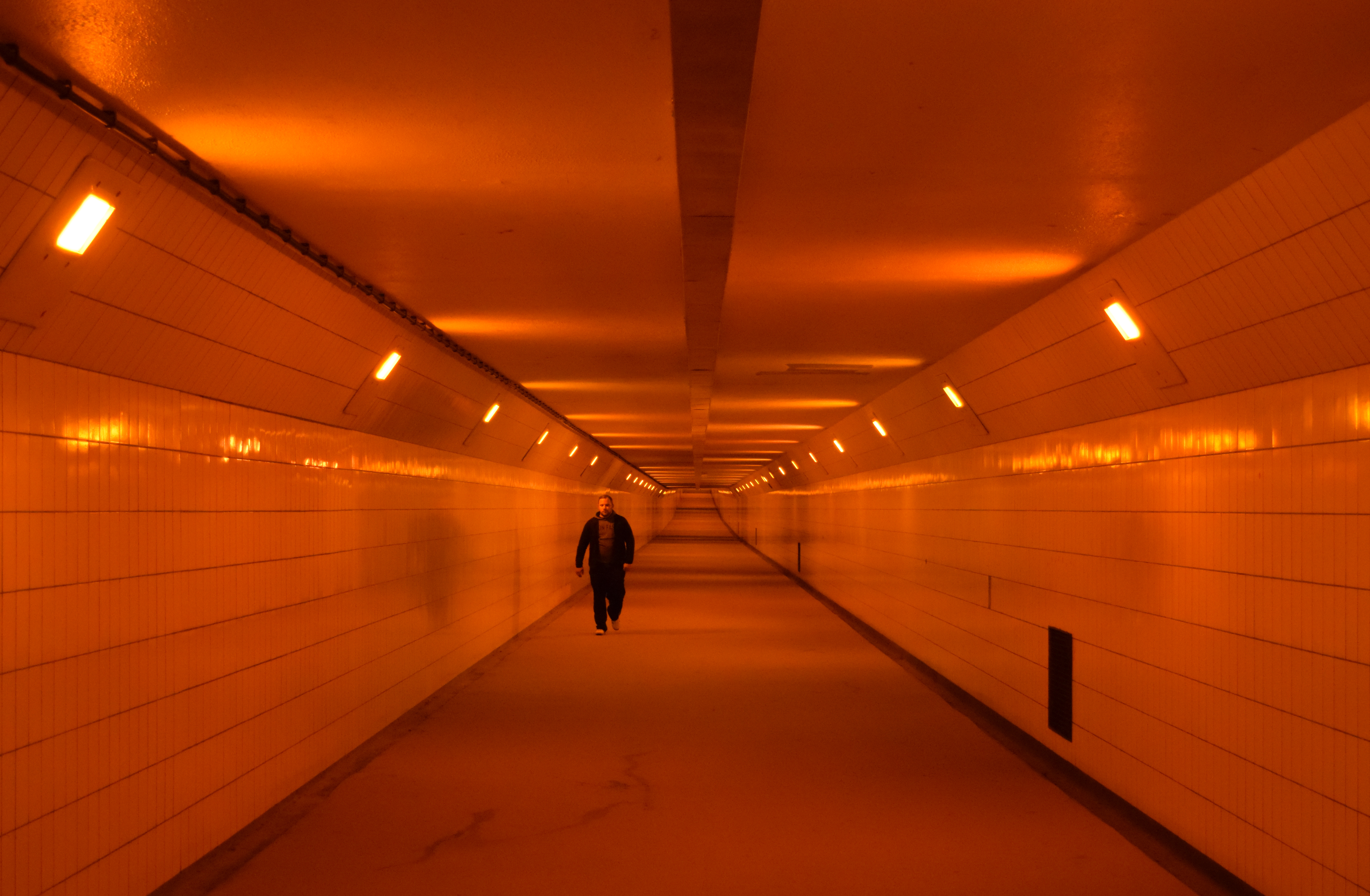
Pedestrian section of the Maastunnel

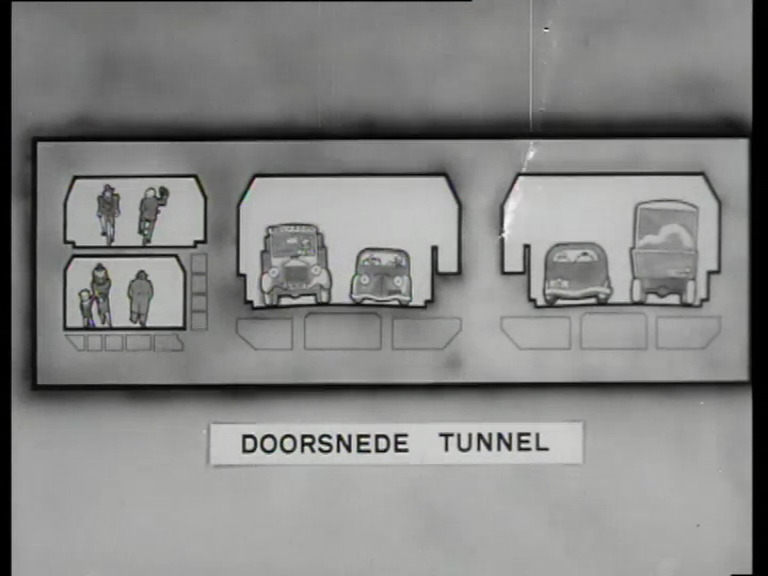
Cross-section of the tunnel from a 1938 video (full video on Commons)

The Maastunnel is a tunnel in Rotterdam, the Netherlands, connecting the banks of the Nieuwe Maas. About 75,000 motor vehicles and a large number of cyclists and pedestrians use the tunnel daily, making the Maastunnel an important part of Rotterdam's road network. Building commenced in 1937 and finished in 1942. There was no official opening ceremony, but the Dutch held an unofficial opening ceremony in secret without Nazi participation.

Construction of the tunnel was preceded by years of animated discussions. Although there was agreement as to the need for a new permanent connection between the two banks of the Nieuwe Maas, there was lack of agreement as to whether it should be a bridge or a tunnel. A tunnel proved to be more attractive financially than a bridge, largely because of the great height a bridge would have needed to avoid hindering the passage of ships from the port of Rotterdam, the largest port in Europe.

The Maastunnel was built using the sunken tube or immersed tube method. Separate parts of the Maastunnel were built elsewhere in a dry dock, and then floated into place and sunk into a trench dug in the river bottom, a technique used in many other Dutch tunnels after the Maastunnel. The Maastunnel was the world's first rectangular shaped underwater tunnel built in this way. Earlier tunnels were all of a circular design. Each of the nine parts of the tunnel has a length of over 60 metres, a height of 9 metres and a width of 25 metres. They contain two side-by-side tubes for motorised traffic, and, beside those, two vertically stacked tubes, one for cyclists and moped riders and the other for pedestrians. Cyclist and pedestrian access is by escalator, the wooden escalators are sized to fit bicycles. The tunnel can also be accessed via two elevators (one on each side) this is mostly used for heavier cargo bikes and mopeds, but accessible to anyone. At one time there was a laboratory in one of the ventilation buildings to examine the air quality in the tunnel.

The Maastunnel was opened to the public on 14 February 1942 and was the first car tunnel in the Netherlands. At the end of the Second World War overhead lines were installed to allow for the passage of trolleybuses. Although two buses were ready for these experimental rides, they were never used for public transportation in Rotterdam, as the overhead lines were removed from the tunnel and used to repair the Rotterdam tramway network overhead lines which had been destroyed during the bombing. In 1944 the German invaders placed explosives in the tunnel so they could destroy it at a moment's notice.

The length of the Maastunnel is 1373 metres (including access roads). The underground part is 1070 metres long. The lowest point of the tunnel is approximately 20 meters below sealevel. Above ground, the tunnel's location can be recognized by its characteristic ventilation buildings on both sides of the river. It can be seen from the nearby Euromast tower as well.
