= Standard penetration test =

Geotechnical engineering test of soil properties

Symbol used in drawings

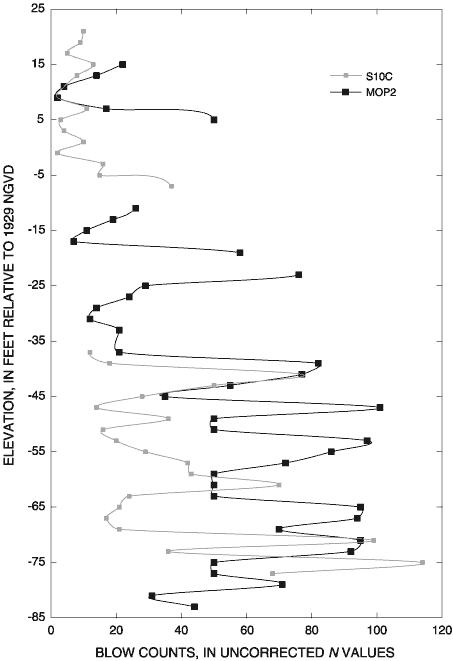
Standard penetration test N values from a surficial aquifer in south Florida.

The standard penetration test (SPT) is an in-situ dynamic penetration test designed to provide information on the geotechnical engineering properties of soil. This test is the most frequently used subsurface exploration drilling test performed worldwide. The test procedure is described in ISO 22476-3, ASTM D1586 and Australian Standards AS 1289.6.3.1. The test provides samples for identification purposes and provides a measure of penetration resistance which can be used for geotechnical design purposes. Various local and widely published international correlations that relate blow count, or N-value, to the engineering properties of soils are available for geotechnical engineering purposes.

== Test procedure ==
A borehole shall be advanced incrementally to permit intermittent or continuous sampling. Intervals are typically 1.5 m (5 ft) or less in homogeneous strata. Tests and sampling should be done at every change in strata.

After the borehole has been advanced to a desired depth and excess cuttings have been removed, testing and sampling can be conducted.

The test uses a thick-walled sampling tube, with an outside diameter of 5.01 cm (2 in) and an inside diameter of 3.5 cm (1.375 in), and a length of at least 60 cm (24 in). The sampling tube is driven into the ground at the bottom of a borehole by blows from a hammer with a mass of 63.5 kg (140 lb) falling a distance of 75 cm (30 in). The sample tube is driven a total of 45 cm into the ground and the number of blows needed for the tube to penetrate each 15 cm (6 in) interval up to a depth of 45 cm (18 in) is recorded. The sum of the number of blows required for the second and third 15 cm (6 in) intervals of penetration is termed the "standard penetration resistance" or the "N-value". N-value provides an indication of the density of the ground, and it is used in many empirical geotechnical engineering formulae.

The test may be stopped if any of the following conditions are met: (1) a total of 50 blows have been applied in any one of the 15 cm (6 in) intervals, (2) a total of 100 blows have been applied over the total 45 cm (18 in) depth, or (3) there is no observed advance of the sampling tube during 10 successive blows.

== Uses ==
The great merit of the test is that it is simple, inexpensive, and widely used. The soil strength parameters which can be inferred from SPT results are approximate, but may give a useful guide in ground conditions where more advanced laboratory testing is not practical or possible.

Another benefit of the test is the collection of a disturbed soil sample for moisture content determination, as well identification and classification purposes. While sample quality is generally not suitable for laboratory testing for engineering properties because of the disturbance of the soil causing changes in engineering properties, the use of a thin-walled tube sampler may result in less disturbance in soft soils.

When the test is carried out in granular soils below groundwater level, the soil may become loosened. In certain circumstances, it can be useful to continue driving the sampler beyond the distance specified, adding further drilling rods as necessary. Although this is not a standard penetration test, and should not be regarded as such, it may at least give an indication as to whether the deposit is really as loose as the standard test may indicate

SPT can also be used for empirical determination of a sand layer's susceptibility to soil liquefaction, based on research performed by Harry Seed, T. Leslie Youd, and others. When used for this purpose, the N-value should be normalized to a standard overburden stress level.

== Correlation with soil mechanical properties ==
Despite its many flaws, it is usual practice to correlate SPT results with soil properties relevant for geotechnical engineering design. SPT results are in-situ field measurements and are often the only test results available. As such, the use of correlations has become common practice in many countries.

One approximate relationship between SPT N-value, relative density, and bulk density for coarse-grained material can be seen in the table below. This is cited in the US Army Corps of Engineers engineering manual publication on sheet pile design developed after Terzaghi and Peck (1948) and Teng (1962).

Relative density	SPT N-value	Bulk density (kg/m^{3})
Very loose	0 - 4	< 1 600
Loose	4 - 10	1 530 - 2 000
Medium	10 - 30	1 750 - 2 100
Dense	30 - 50	1 750 - 2 245
Very dense	> 50	> 2 100

== Problems ==
The standard penetration test recovers a highly disturbed sample, which is generally not suitable for tests which measure properties of the in-situ soil structure, such as density, strength, and consolidation characteristics. To overcome this limitation, the test is often run with a larger sampler with a slightly different tip shape, so the disturbance of the sample is minimized, and testing of structural properties is meaningful for all but soft soils. However, this results in blow counts which are not easily converted to SPT N-values – many conversions have been proposed, some of which depend on the type of soil sampled, making reliance on blow counts with non-standard samplers problematic.

Standard penetration test blow counts do not represent a simple physical property of the soil, and thus must be correlated to soil properties of interest, such as strength or density. There exist multiple correlations, none of which are of very high quality. Use of SPT data for direct prediction of liquefaction potential suffers from roughness of correlations and from the need to "normalize" SPT data to account for overburden pressure, sampling technique, and other factors. Additionally, the method cannot collect accurate data for weak soil layers for several reasons:

1. The results are limited to whole numbers for a specific driving interval, but with very low blow counts, the granularity of the results, and the possibility of a zero result, makes handling the data cumbersome.
2. In loose sands and very soft clays, the act of driving the sampler will significantly disturb the soil, including by soil liquefaction of loose sands, giving results based on the disturbed soil properties rather than the intact soil properties.

A variety of techniques have been proposed to compensate for the deficiencies of the standard penetration testing, including the Cone penetration test, in-situ vane shear tests, and shear wave velocity measurements.

== See also ==
- Cone penetration test
- Geotechnical investigation
- Soil mechanics
