= Haringvlietdam =

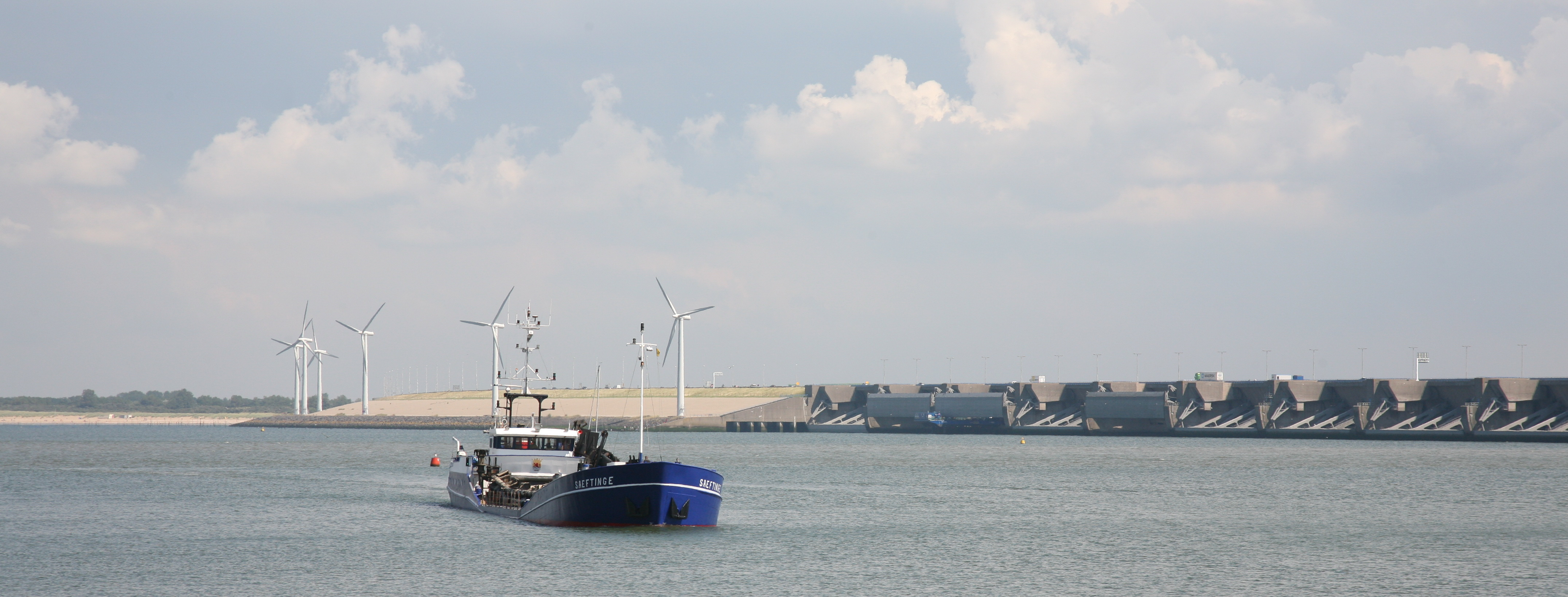
- Coordinates: 51°50′0″N 4°03′0″E
- Carries: N57
- Crosses: haringvliet
- Locale: Voorne-Putten, Goeree-Overflakkee
- Owner: Rijkswaterstaat

Characteristics
- Material: Concrete, steel
- Total length: 5 kilometres (3.1 mi)
- Width: 56 metres (184 ft)
- Longest span: 56.5 metres (185 ft)
- No. of spans: 17

History
- Construction start: 1958
- Construction end: 1971
- Inaugurated: 15 November 1971

The Haringvlietdam, incorporating the Haringvliet sluices, are hydraulic engineering structures which closed off the estuary of the Haringvliet, Netherlands, as part of the Delta Works. The structure consists of 17 sluices, several kilometres of dam and a shipping lock, and formed the sixth project of the Delta Works.

The northernmost of the Delta Works, it was supposed to be finished by 1968 as the first part of the project. Building started in 1957 and was finished in 1971. Instead of damming the estuary it was decided to build sluices in order to be able to let in salt water to prevent freezing of the rivers Meuse and Rhine and to drain these rivers in case of flood.

The height of the dam crest is 18.5m above Normaal Amsterdams Peil (NAP), and 17.3m above the water level in the Haringvliet. The width between piers is 56.5 metres, and the depth of the sill of the gates was partly determined by the need for ice breakers to pass through them at low tide, being fixed at 5.5 metres below NAP.

The sluice complex has 17 openings and an effective total aperture of about 6,000 square metres at half tide. The sluices have two doors each, of which the door on the sea side is the lowest. This was undertaken to mitigate the effect of waves on the doors. On the seaward side of the sluice complex, there is a 7m deep step to induce wave breaking against a concrete wall, thus reducing the strain on the gates by around 50%.

The subsoil consists of clay and soft sandy layers to depths ranging from 20 to 30 metres below NAP. The sluice structures are founded on pile foundations.

In 2011, Rijkswaterstaat implemented a ‘Kierbesluit’ policy, which directed that the Haringvliet sluices be opened slightly when the Haringvliet water level is lower than the sea water level, allowing limited saltwater intrusion and the migration of fish into the Haringvliet. The policy was implemented in order to improve the ecological situation in the Meuse and Rhine. The change has also resulted in a minor return of the tides in areas like Tiengemeten and the Biesbosch, both of which are important nature reserves.
