= Fascine mattress =

Large woven mat of brushwood used in river and coastal erosion control

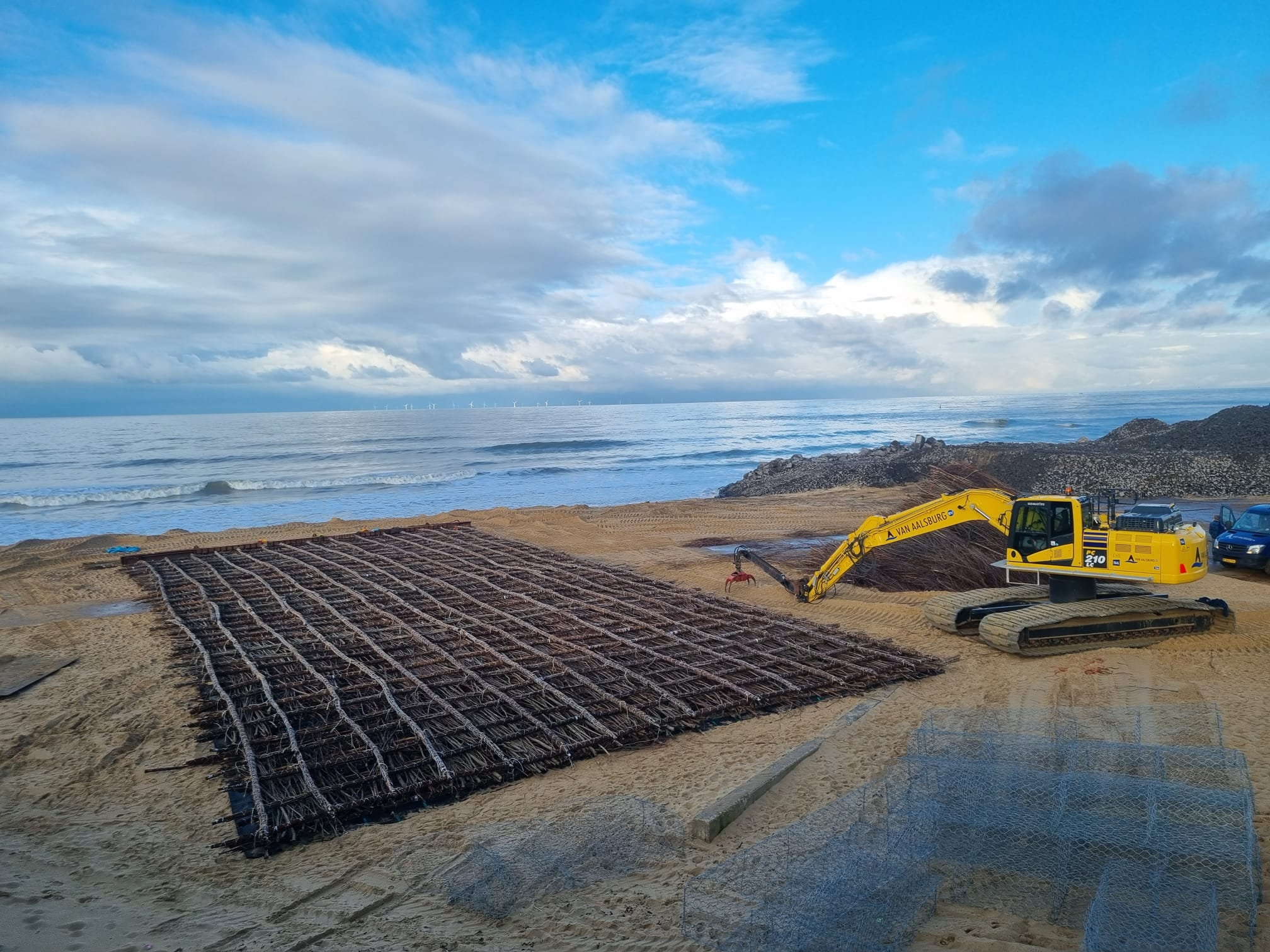
Preparation of a fascine mattress prior to immersion in Wenduine

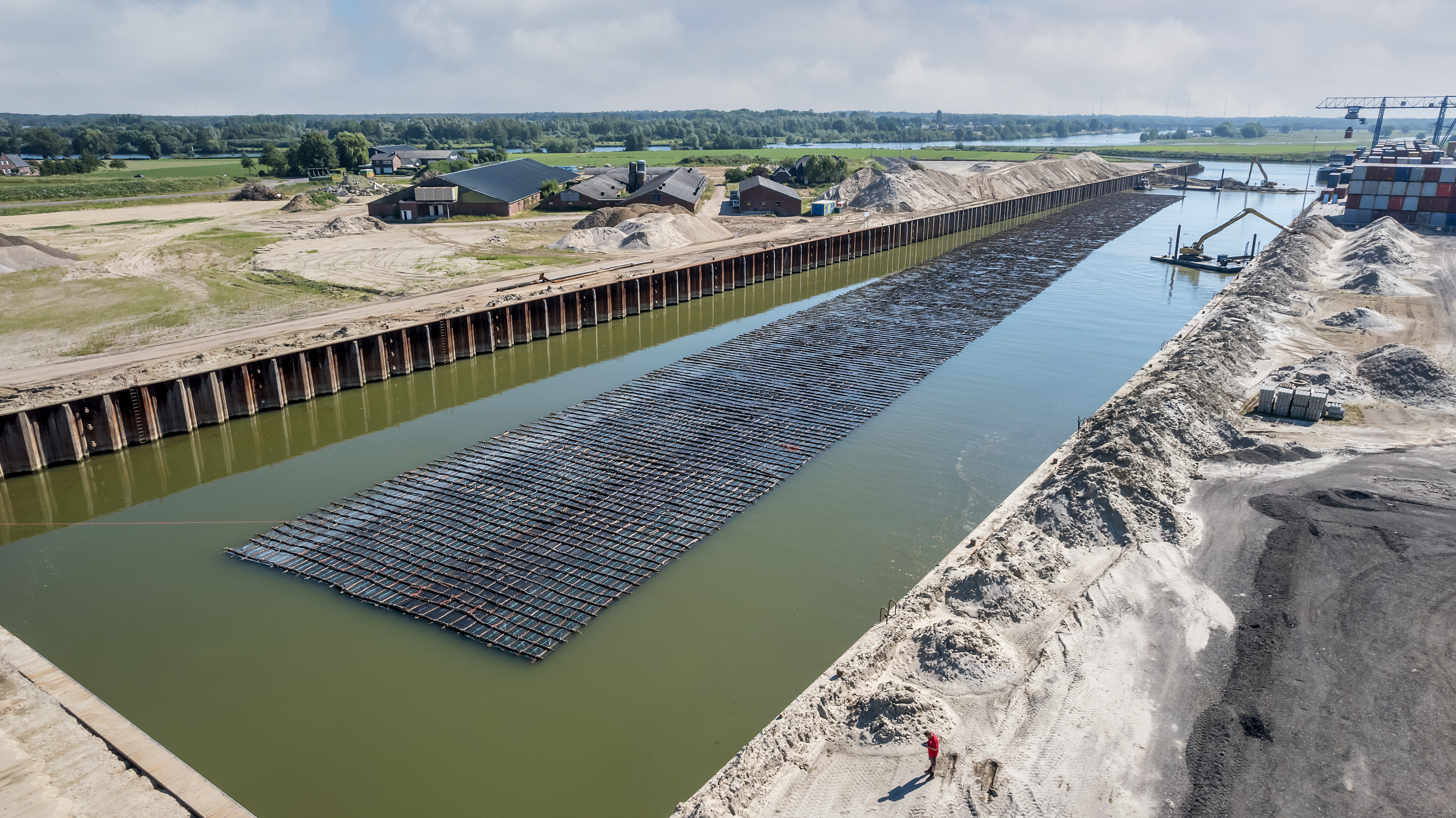
A fascine mattress being prepared for sinking in the port of Wanssum on the Maas

A fascine mattress (Dutch: Zinkstuk, literally sink piece), is a large woven mat made of brushwood, typically willow twigs and shoots, used to protect riverbeds and other underwater surfaces from scour and erosion. They are similar in construction to a fascine, but are primarily used for hydraulic engineering works, typically to strengthen the banks of rivers and streams, as well as coastal structures like revetments and groynes.

Modern fascine mattresses utilise a layer of geotextile in order to fulfill the competing requirements of water permeability balanced with the need to be impervious to sand. Prior to the advent of synthetic geotextiles in the 1960s, a layer formed from reeds was incorporated to make the fascine mattress sand-tight.

Fascine mattresses have been used worldwide, but are particularly common in The Netherlands, where significant expertise in their preparation and construction is available, and where the materials required for their construction are harvested in specially created plantations.

== Historical background ==
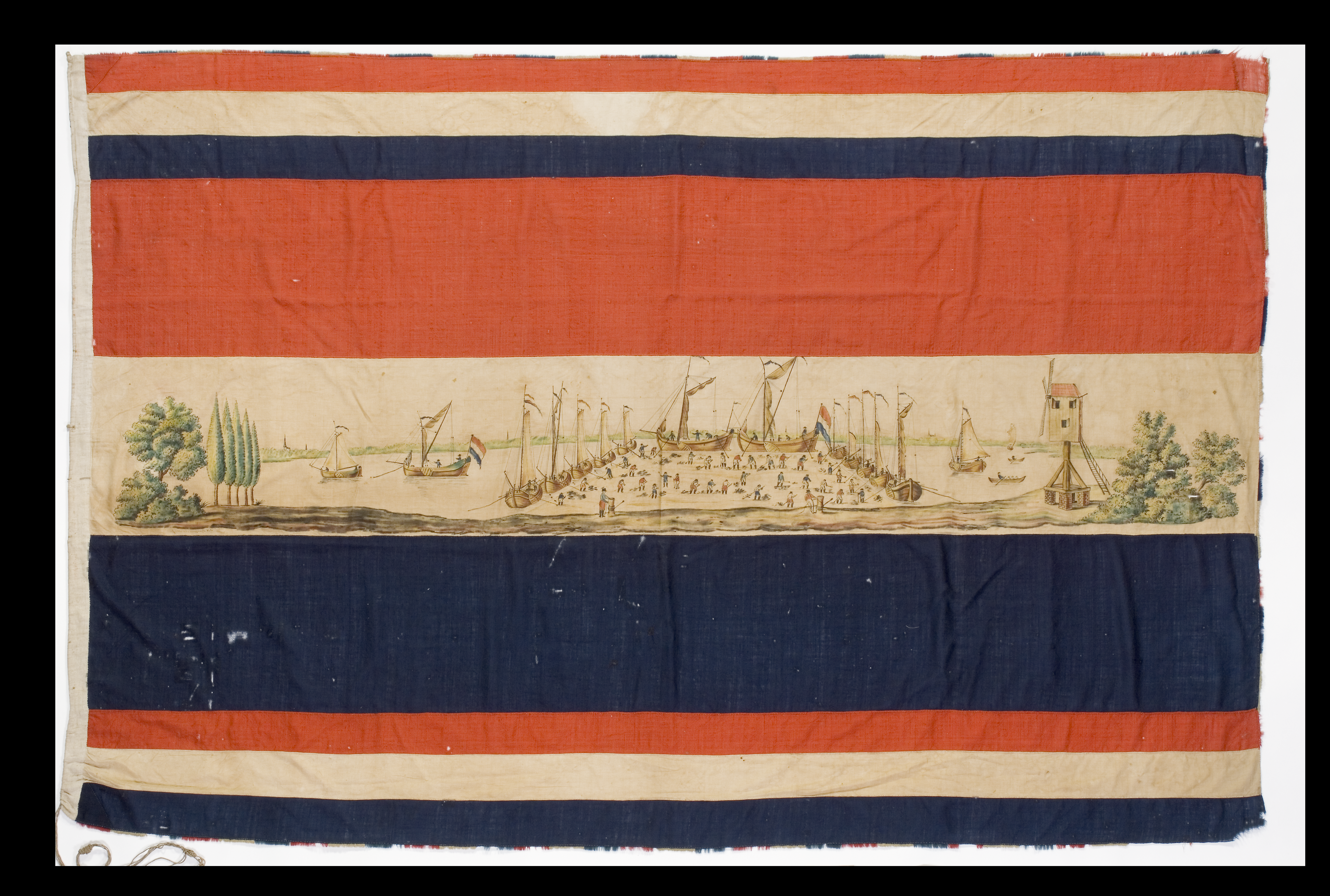
A flag painted with a depiction of fascine mattress construction, c. 1850

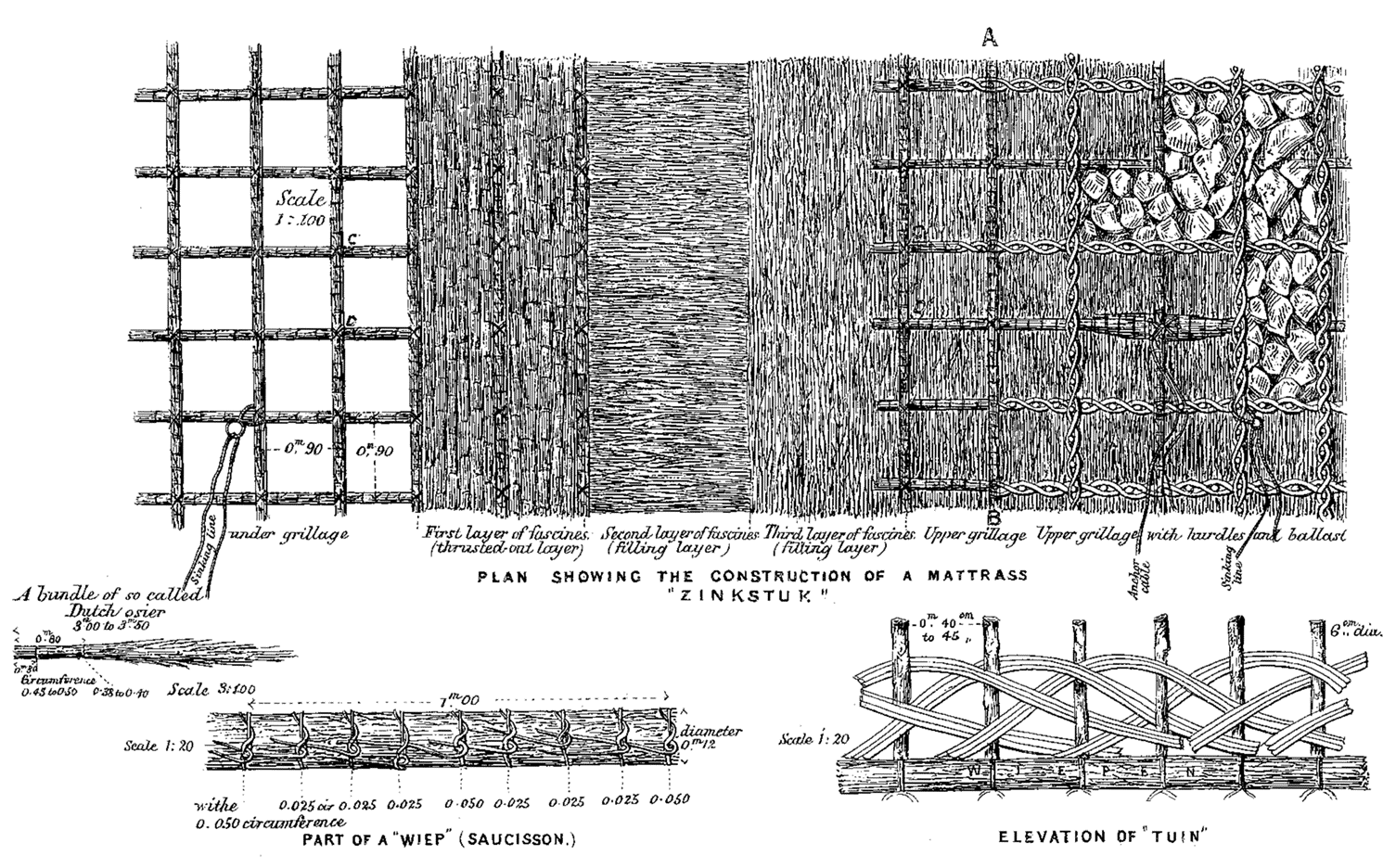
Plan showing construction of a traditional fascine mattress (zinkstuk) from 1875

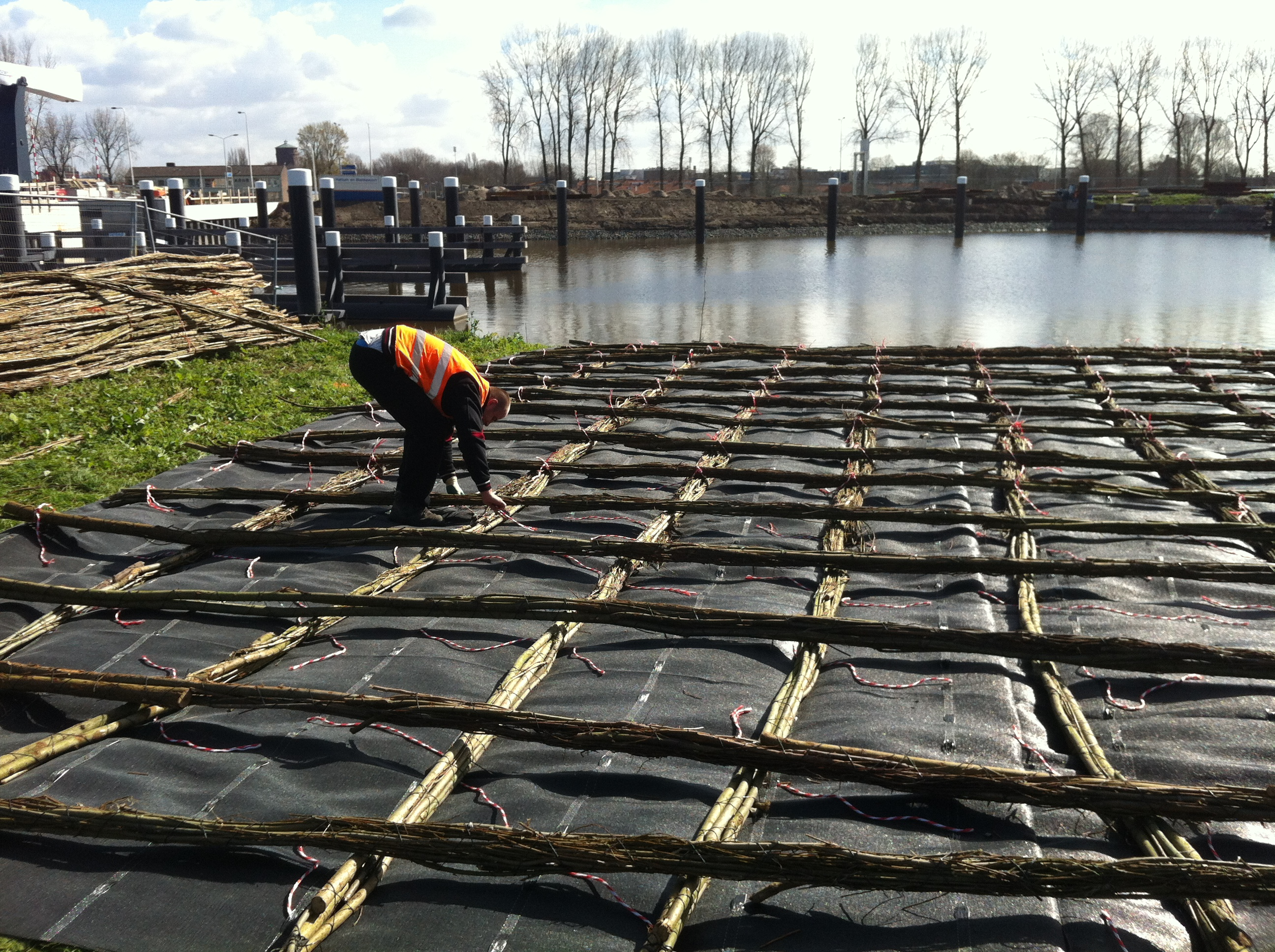
A modern fascine mattress being prepared for installation in Gouda. The synthetic geotextile underlayer can be clearly seen.

Zinkstuk have been used in the Netherlands for river and coastal engineering works since at least the 16th century, and were discussed extensively by Andries Vierlingh in his Tractaet van Dijckagie (English: Treatise on dike building), the manuscript of which was not published until 1920, and is now housed in the Nationaal Archief.

The materials for fascine mattresses in The Netherlands were traditionally harvested in osier beds along rivers such as The Merwede, particularly around the Biesbosch, where the materials were grown and coppiced in order to produce the mattresses. The towns of Werkendam and Sliedrecht are notable as centres of zinkstuk fabrication and construction expertise.

In the 16th century, dike workers in The Netherlands were often impoverished, taking on jobs under a day-rate contract. Dike building works were usually tendered in the month of March and often had to be completed by August, and fascine mattresses were a common feature of the work.

By the end of the 17th century, floating fascine mattresses had been introduced for closure works in the Netherlands, with the mattresses being assembled and then towed to the required location, where they were ballasted by rocks and then immersed by sinking. This technique was used as scour protection at the bed level, and the ability to stack layers of fascines on top of each other in the required location up to the level of low tide with this method made gradual closures possible.

In the mid to late 19th century, fascine mattresses were used across the Netherlands, including in works at Schellingwoude and the Sloedam, along with sections of embankments at the Hollands Diep and shore protection works in Westkapelle. Sections of the Rhine between Lobith and Pannerden were strengthened by fascine mattresses from 1851. Fascine mattresses were also used extensively in the construction of sections of the Amsterdam Ship Canal and the Port of Rotterdam. By the middle of the 1800s, engineering knowledge around fascine mattress installation had begun to be included in Dutch engineering textbooks.

By 1910, the town of Werkendam was home to 160 fascine mattress workers (rijswerkers), some of whom worked abroad. Their wages at the time ranged from 12 to 18 guilders per week. As Dutch dredging and hydraulic engineering contractors began to undertake works internationally, the workers earned up to 50 guilders per week overseas. Much of their income was spent on basic sustenance, with workers often living on the worksite in a hut or cabin. An average of eight months per year was spent at fascine mattress work, with the remaining four months (usually from November to March) spent on tasks such as coppicing and harvesting.

== Preparation and construction (traditional) ==
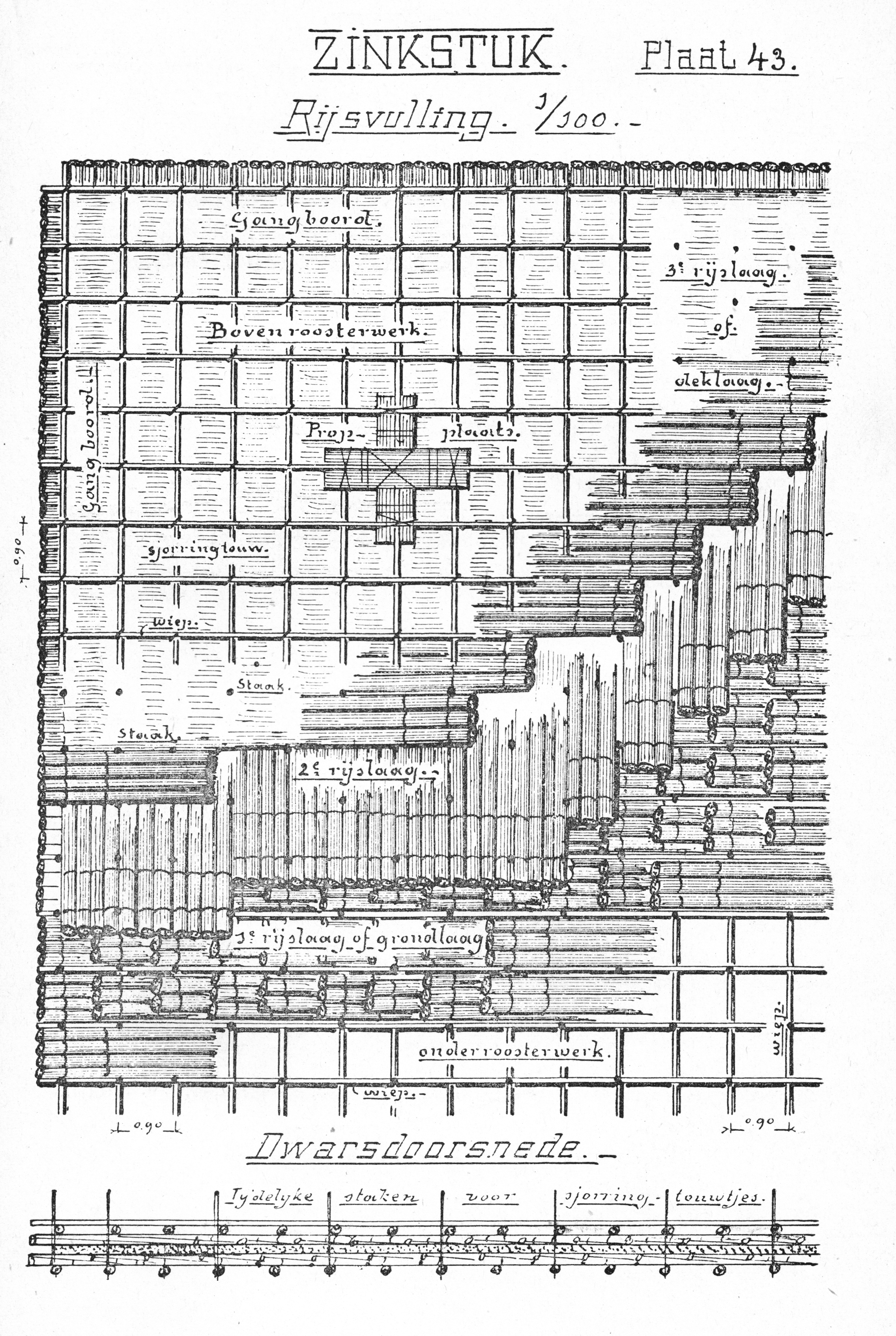
Technical details of a classic fascine mattress

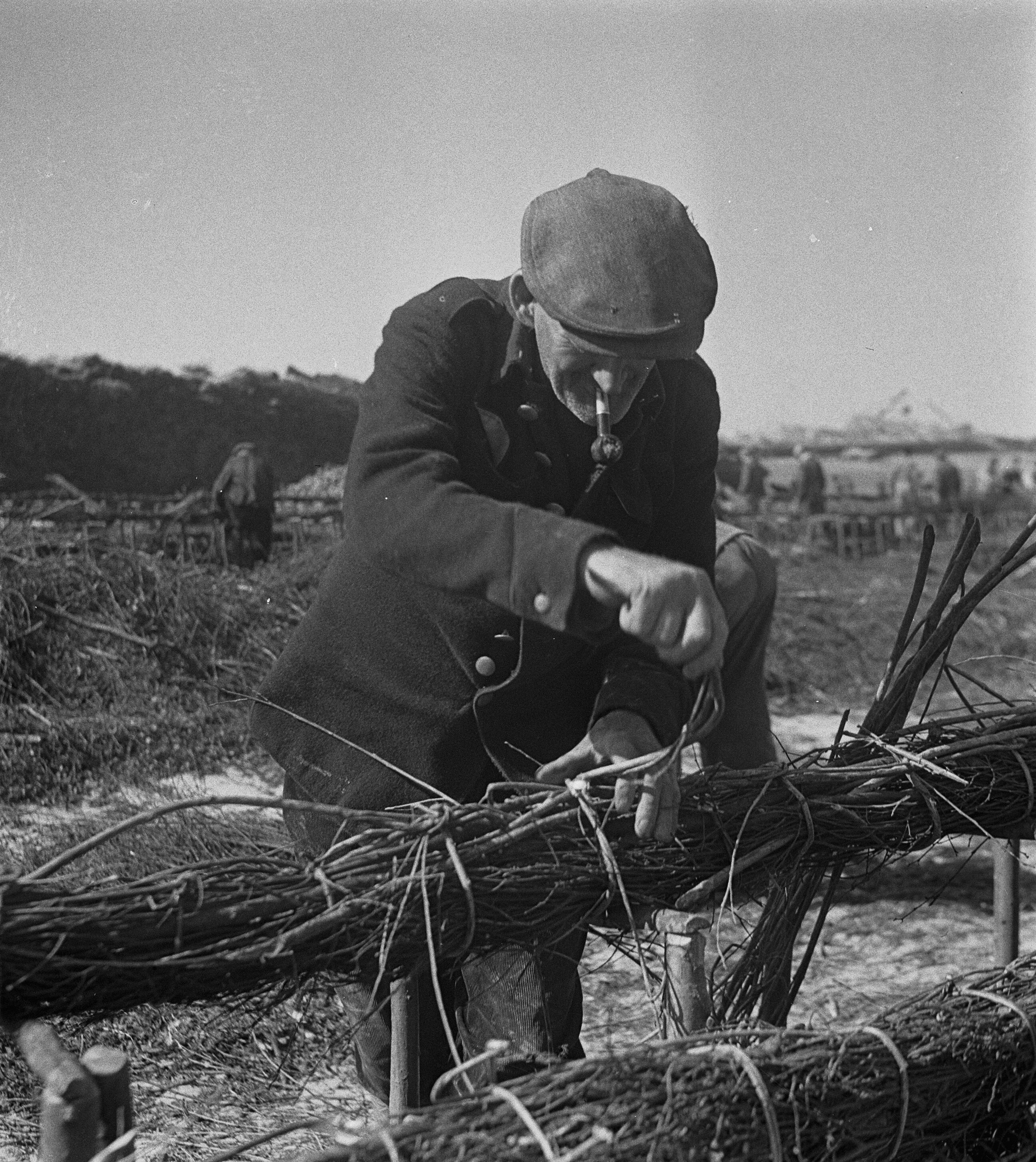
A Rijswerker engaged in the assembly of a fascine mattress

The main component of a traditional fascine mattress is willow twigs, which are formed into a wattle. Willow timber has several properties that are important throughout the process of creating and sinking a fascine mattress, being flexible, robust, and buoyant. The manufacturing process of a traditional fascine mattress begins by winding rope around the willow in both directions using a machine, resulting in a lengthy roll known as a wattle.

Historically, a considerable number of skilled workers, known in the Netherlands as rijswerkers, were required to create wattles at a proprietary stand. Nowadays, with the use of machinery, this process is more efficient and allows for adjustments to the thickness and length of the wattle as required.

The mattress is assembled on a patch of ground adjacent to the water, and once the wattle is complete, the mat is towed to the desired location and sunk to the bed using dumped stones. The bottom layer of a traditional fascine mattress is a lattice structure composed of wattle, spaced around one metre apart. On top of this base are arranged two crisscrossing layers of willow twigs, referred to as the first and second brush layers.

To ensure the fascine mattress is sand-tight, a layer of reed is inserted between these brush layers. Occasionally, for added stability, a third brush layer may be placed above the second. Following this, an upper lattice of wattle is installed to secure the entire structure.

The cohesion of the mattress is then reinforced by tightly binding the upper and lower lattices together using ropes. In The Netherlands, it is common to add tuinen, a type of fencing, to the top of the fascine mattress in order to prevent the stones dumped onto it from rolling off during underwater immersion.

Timber stakes are used to mark out a working grid, indicating the precise positions for the layout of the wattle. Then, the brushwood is layered between the wattles, followed by the addition of the second brush layer, before the top layer is positioned. By this stage, the fascine mattress is around half a metre thick. Finally, the bindings are tightened to create a coherent, unified structure ready for installation.

== Construction (modern) ==
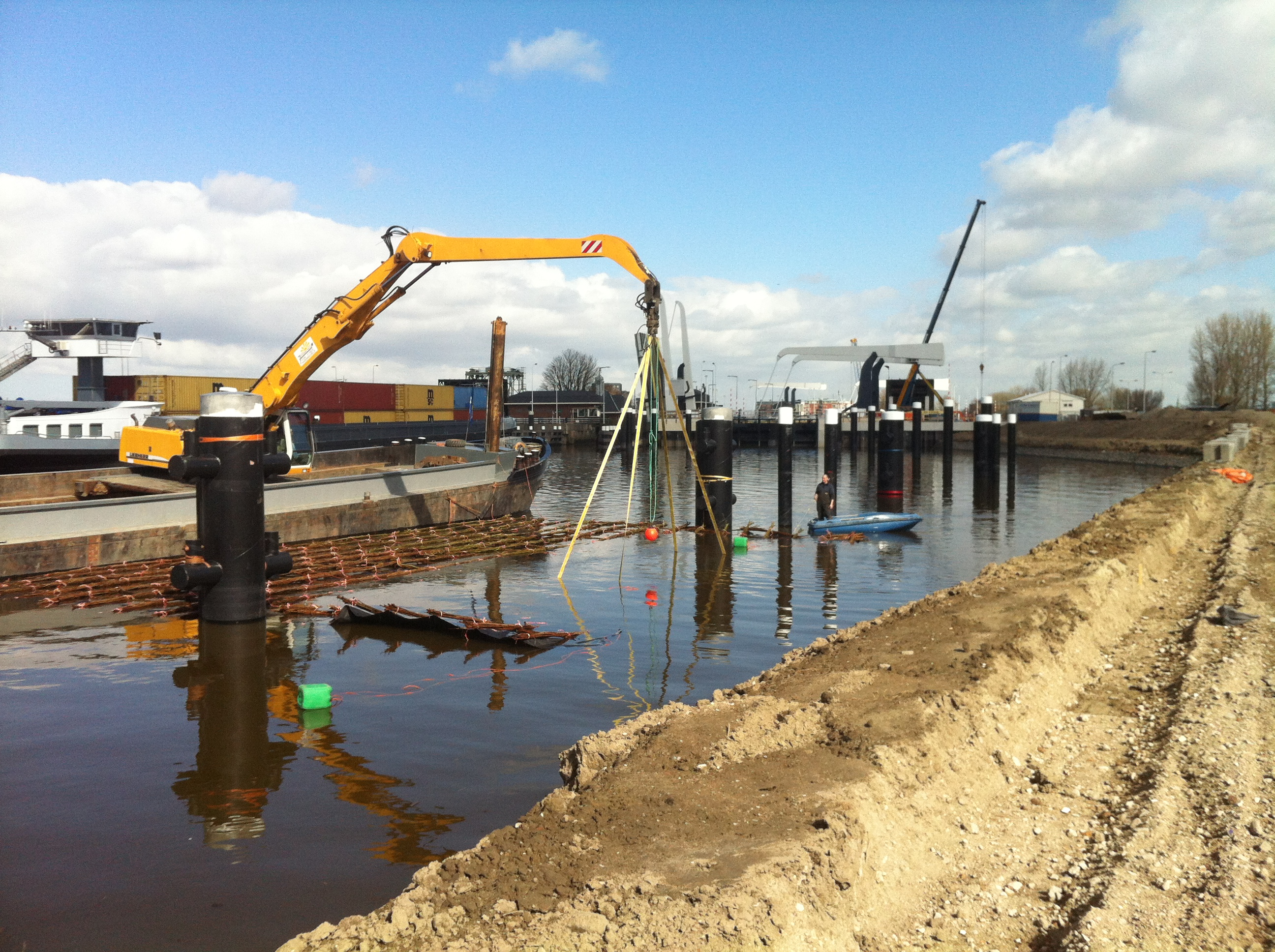
Installation of a fascine mattress

The construction of the Delta Works, prompted by the effects of the North Sea flood of 1953, was of such a vast scale that tremendous quantities of brushwood would have been required to utilise traditional fascine mattresses across all of the Delta Works projects. As a result, the Deltadienst department of Rijkswaterstaat decided to undertake research and experiments at the Waterloopkundig Laboratorium, to investigate the possibility of improving the traditional mattress and reducing the quantity of brushwood required.

This work coincided with the advent of synthetic geotextiles in the late 1950s and early 1960s, and traditional fascine mattresses began to reduce in popularity, with use being made of woven polypropylene fabrics in place of the reed underlayer. Traditional fascine mattresses are however still used, with their application often limited to locations where synthetic materials and plastics are discouraged or prohibited for environmental reasons.

For the Delta Works, 'block mat' fascine mattresses consisting of a fabric with concrete blocks attached were rolled up and immersed by unrolling the mat with a special ship, the Cardium, during the construction of the Oosterscheldekering. These mattresses were reinforced with steel cables to mitigate the effects of tension.

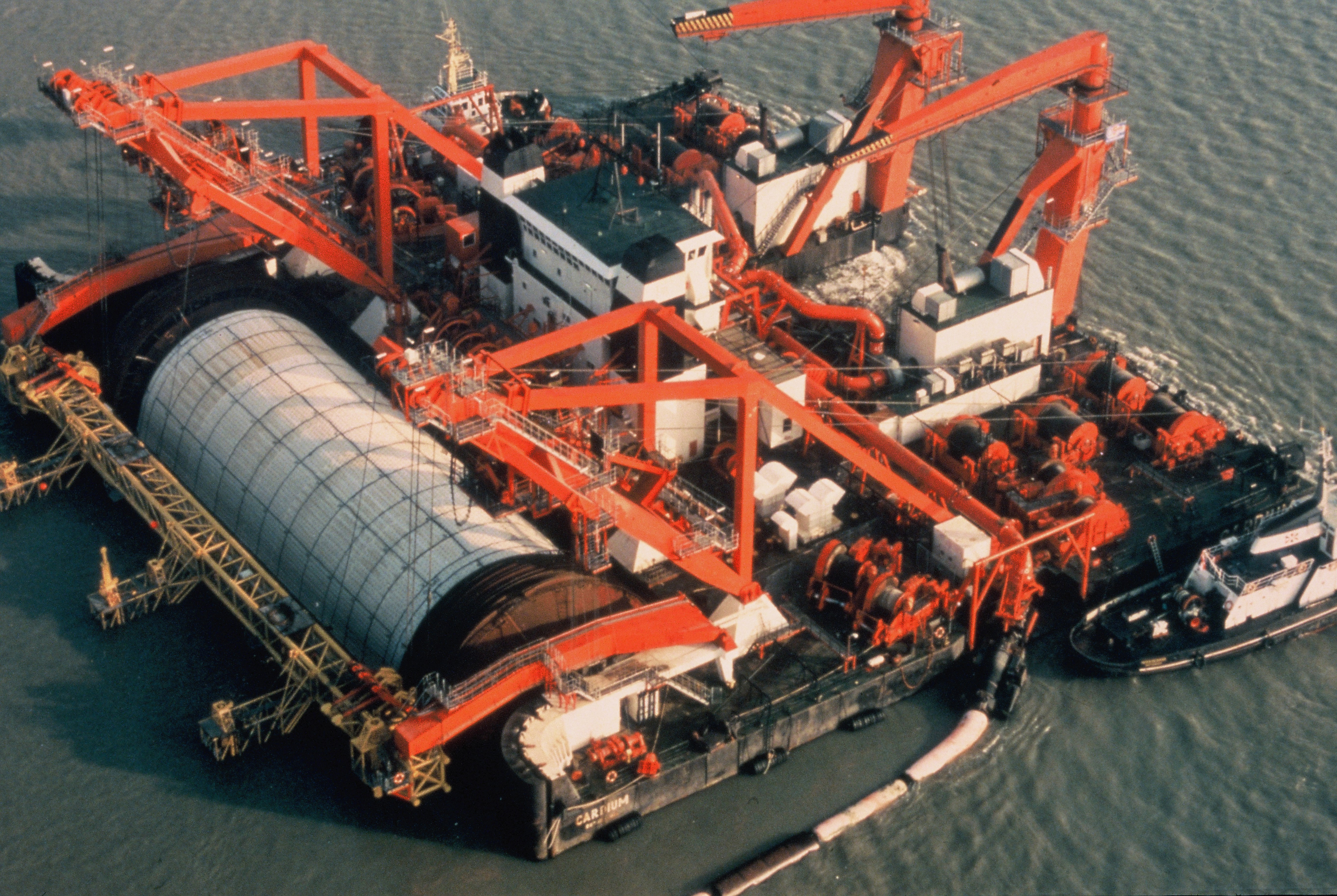
The Cardium, a purpose-built vessel used for the placement of concrete block mattresses during the construction of the Oosterscheldekering.

Modern fascine mattresses are made using a woven polypropylene fabric which is water-permeable, sand-tight and contains pre-woven loops. The loops allow the fabric to be attached to a wattle grid using a rope, without the need to create holes.

These modern mattresses are much thinner than traditional mattresses, with a longer design life. The function of the wattle grid is to provide sufficient buoyancy and rigidity to the fabric during the sinking process. The absence of a wattle grid precludes the underlayer fabric from being uniformly flat across the riverbed or underwater surface onto which it is placed. The grid also prevents broken stone from rolling off, particularly when used on revetments or sloping surfaces.

== Placement ==
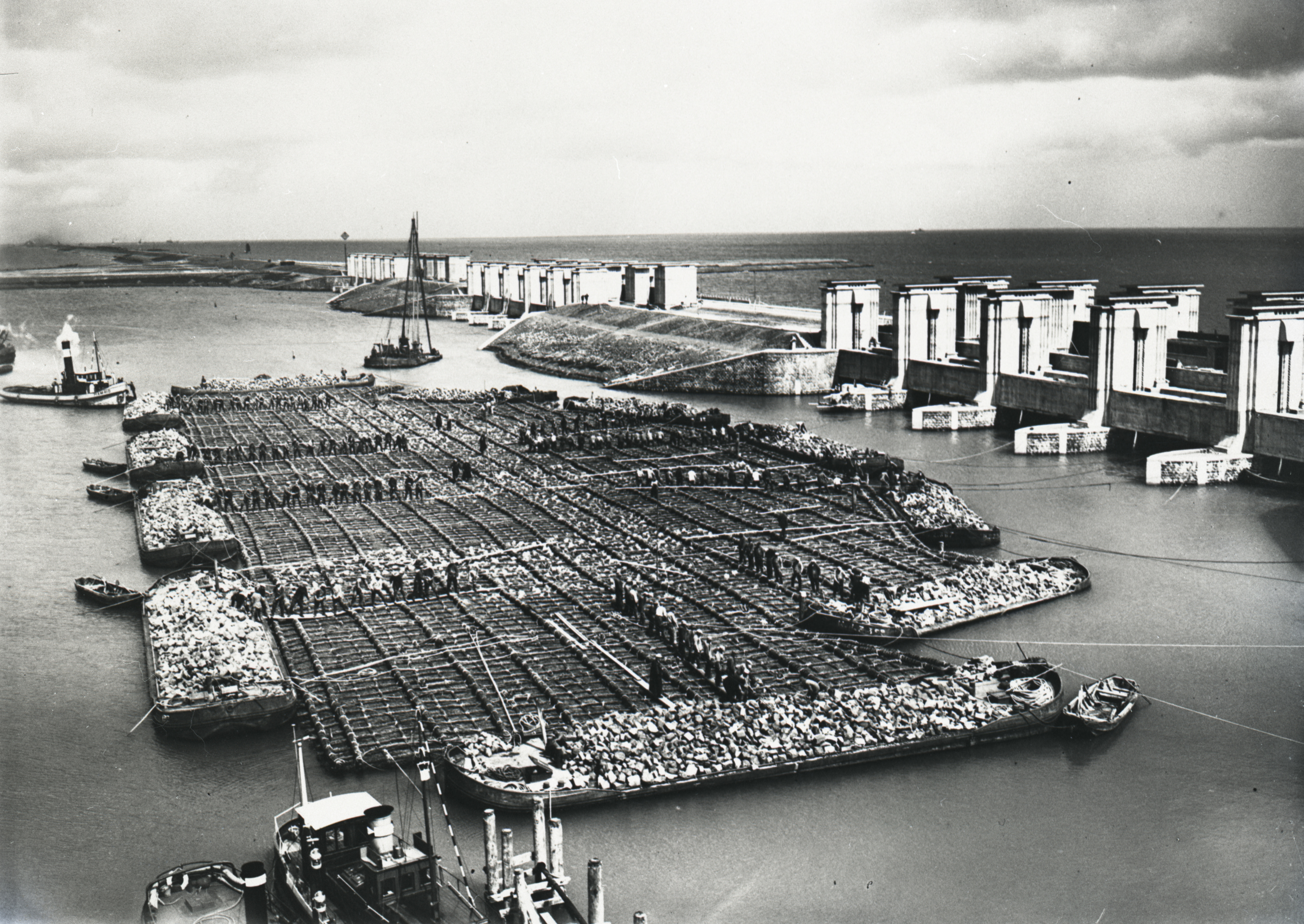
Installation of fascine mattresses at the Afsluitdijk in 1932

Fascine mattresses are immersed by dumping stone or rock onto the surface, causing it to sink to the bottom. In tidal waters, this must occur at a time when there are no (or very low) tidal currents, usually at slack water. Once the fascine mattress is in place, the underlying bed is protected from erosion by the flowing water and deformation of the riverbed or bank is negated.

The dumped stones ensure that the mattress remains in place and provides protection against wave action on banks. The design life of a fascine mattress can be as much as 100 years. In the past, a fascine mattress was immersed using skilled labour placing stones on it by hand, such as during the construction of the Afsluitdijk. It is important that the stones are applied evenly, and that everyone is clear of the fascine mattress at the time of sinking. Modern mattresses are placed using civil engineering plant such as crane barges, long reach excavators and, in deeper water, side stone-dumping vessels.

Placement of a mattress in conditions where there is a flowing current is nearly impossible with this method, however placement using a pair of pontoons and a side-stone dumping vessel is possible. In the latter situation, the mattress is connected to a pair of sinking beams (hollow tubes), which are filled with water at the appropriate time to sink the mattress. After immersion, these sinking beams are disconnected from the mattress, filled with air, and recovered.

== Examples of use ==
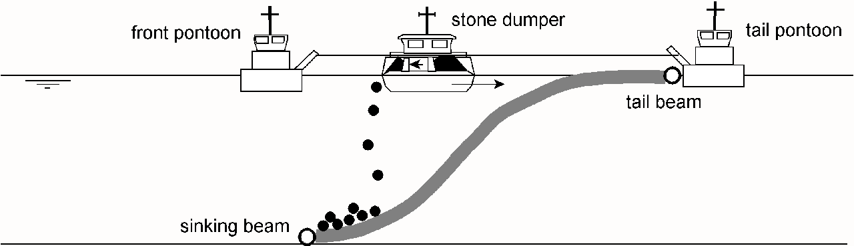
Sinking process of a fascine mattress with currents

Fascine mattresses have been used in projects across the world, and their use in The Netherlands has been extensive, including projects such as the Afsluitdijk and Delta Works projects such as the Zandkreekdam, Volkerakdam, Brouwersdam, and Grevelingendam. The technique was also used in Zeeland for dike reinforcements in the Eastern Scheldt and in the construction and extension of the piers of IJmuiden and the widening of the North Sea Canal.

Extensive use of fascine mattresses was made during the emergency recovery works following the Inundation of Walcheren, with the rijswerker Gerrit Visser of Van Oord decorated by the authorities in Zeeland for supervising the immersion of 36 fascine mattresses over a total area of 52,700 square metres during the works. Visser is portrayed as the character Klaas Otterkop in A. den Doolaard's non-fiction novel Het verjaagde water.

== Application outside the Netherlands ==
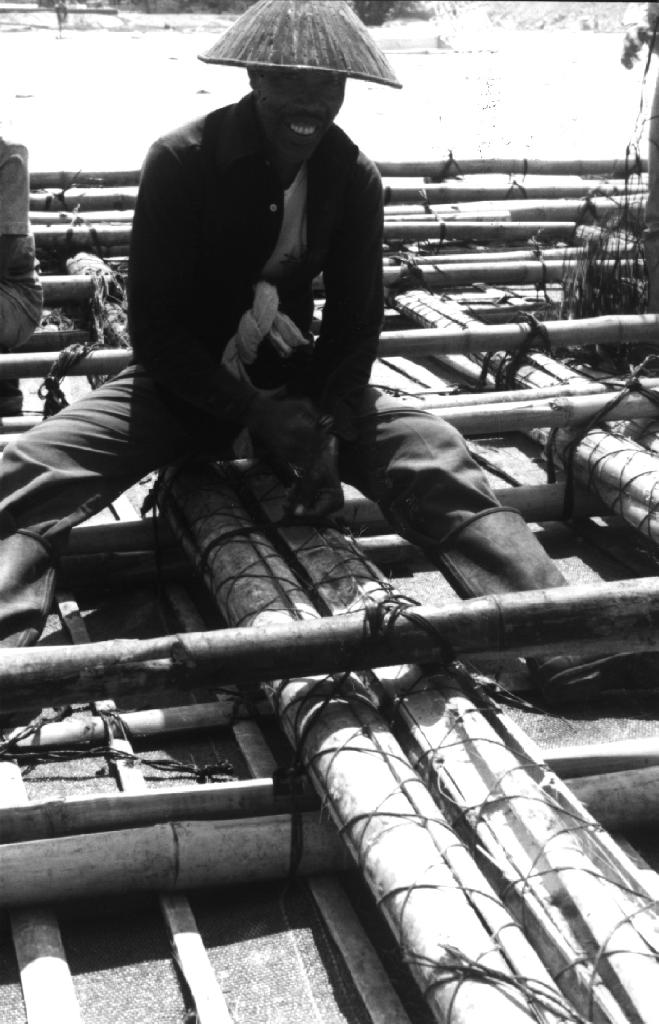
Mattress made of bamboo

The ideas of Andries Vierlingh, as set out in his Tractaet van Dijckagie, were used in the 16th century by Cornelius Vermuyden for his drainage works in England. Around 1750, the Dutch engineer Cornelis Janszoon Meijer introduced fascine mattresses for bed protection works in Italy.

At the request of the Japanese government in the 1870s, a number of Dutch hydraulic engineers were invited to improve hydraulic engineering works in Japan. These engineers included Cornelis Johannes van Doorn, who was in charge of renovation work on the Tone, Edo and Yodo Rivers, along with works on the Asaka Irrigation Canal in Fukushima Prefecture and the Nobiru Port in Sendai Bay.

Van Doorn introduced fascine mattresses and rijswerkers during the period 1872 – 1880, and the art and science of making fascine mattresses subsequently became known in Japan as the Westerwiel method, named for one of the Dutch rijswerkers, and is now known in Japan as the "Japanese traditional method".

In 1849, the British engineer Charles Blacker Vignoles visited Dutch contractors Aart Schram and Leendert Martinus Prins in Sliedrecht, and arranged for them to travel to Kyiv and install fascine mattresses as scour protection to the piers of the Nicholas Chain Bridge, which had suffered extensive damage during construction.

Other examples of the use of fascine mattresses outside the Netherlands in the 19th century include riverbank improvement works by James Buchanan Eads on the southern Mississippi, using fascines made from Poplar trees and shoots grown on the banks above Baton Rouge, and protection works using fascine mattresses made from mangroves on the coastline of British Guiana.

Fascine mattresses continue to be used internationally, including for bed protection works in Belgium, Germany, Bangladesh, Vietnam, India, and Laos, particularly in the framework of sustainable, nature-based, and development aid projects. One benefit of the method is that whilst these systems are labour intensive, they do not require significant capital expenditure, which is therefore an advantage in developing countries.

== See also ==
- Coastal engineering
- Fascine
