= Jetty =

Low bank or small wharf stretching from the shore into a water span

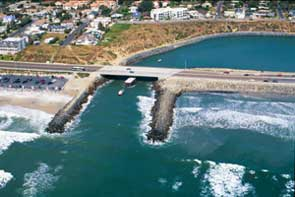
Coastal lagoons fronted by barrier spits typically have entrances that migrate over time. Here, the entrance has been fixed by jetty construction. Carlsbad, California, April 1998.

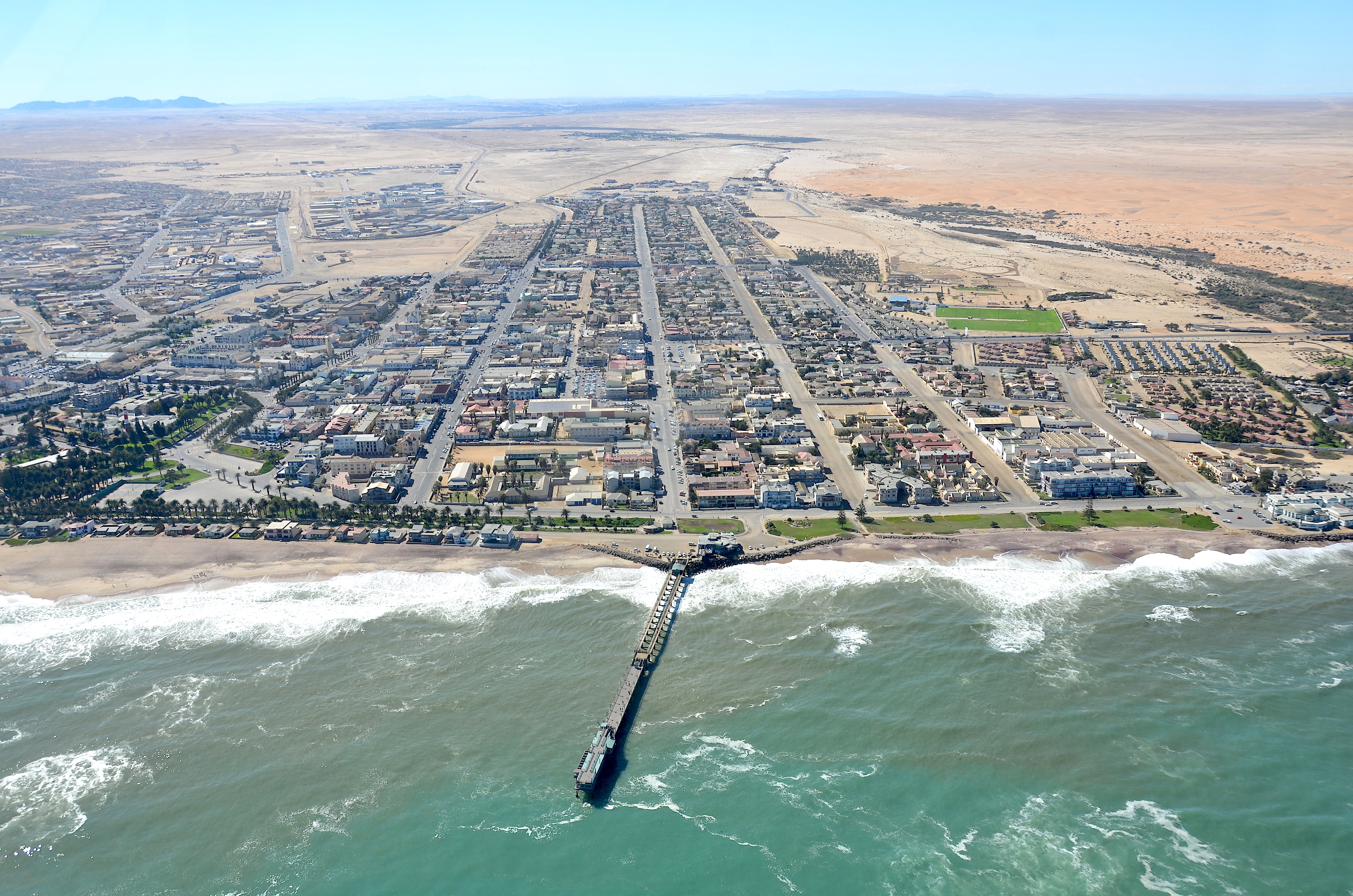
Aerial view of a jetty at Swakopmund, Namibia (2017)

A jetty is a man-made structure that protrudes from land out into water. A jetty may serve as a breakwater, as a walkway, or both; or, in pairs, as a means of constricting a channel. The term derives from the French word jetée, 'thrown', signifying something thrown out.

== For regulating rivers ==
=== Wing dams ===
Jetties of one form, wing dams, are extended out, opposite one another, from each bank of a river, at intervals, to contract a wide channel, and concentrate the current to deepen the channel.

=== At the outlet of tideless rivers ===
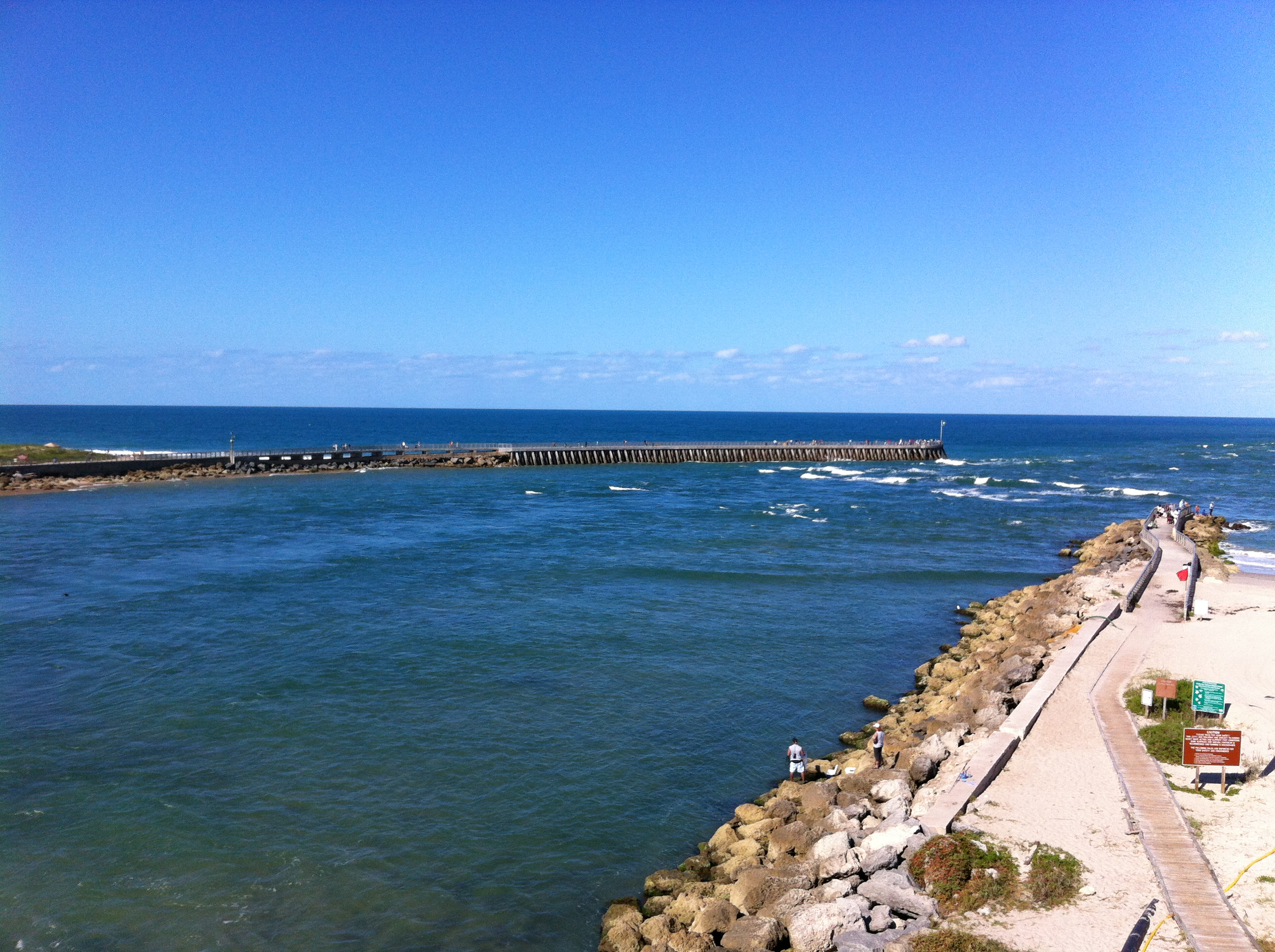
North Jetty on the left and South Jetty on the right at the mouth of Sebastian Inlet in Florida from the Indian River to the Atlantic Ocean.

Jetties have been constructed on each side of the outlet river of some of the rivers flowing into the Baltic, with the objective of prolonging the scour of the river and protecting the channel from being shoaled by the littoral drift along the shore. Another application of parallel jetties is in lowering the bar in front of one of the mouths of a deltaic river flowing into a tide — a virtual prolongation of its less sea, by extending the scour of the river out to the bar by banks.

Jetties prolonging the Sulina branch of the Danube into the Black Sea, and the south pass of the Mississippi River into the Gulf of Mexico, formed of rubble stone and concrete blocks respectively, have enabled the discharge of these rivers to scour away the bars obstructing the access to them; and they have also carried the sediment-bearing waters sufficiently far out to come under the influence of littoral currents, which, by conveying away some of the sediment, postpone the eventual formation of a fresh bar farther out (see river engineering).

=== At the mouth of tidal rivers ===
Where a river is narrow near its mouth, has a generally feeble discharge and a small tidal range, the sea is liable on an exposed coast to block up its outlet during severe storms. The river is thus forced to seek another exit at a weak spot of the beach, which along a low coast may be at some distance off; and this new outlet in its turn may be blocked up, so that the river from time to time shifts the position of its mouth. This inconvenient cycle of changes may be stopped by fixing the outlet of the river at a suitable site, by carrying a jetty on each side of this outlet across the beach, thereby concentrating its discharge in a definite channel and protecting the mouth from being blocked up by littoral drift. This system was long ago applied to the shifting outlet of the river Yare to the south of Yarmouth, and has also been successfully employed for fixing the wandering mouth of the Adur near Shoreham, and of the Adour flowing into the Bay of Biscay below Bayonne.

When a new channel was cut across the Hook of Holland to provide a straighter and deeper outlet channel for the river Meuse, forming the approach channel to Rotterdam, low, broad, parallel jetties, composed of fascine mattresses weighted with stone, were carried across the foreshore into the sea on either side of the new mouth of the river, to protect the jetty channel from littoral drift, and cause the discharge of the river to maintain it out to deep water. The channel, also, beyond the outlet of the river Nervion into the Bay of Biscay has been regulated by jetties; and by extending the south-west jetty out for nearly 0.5 miles (0.80 km) with a curve concave towards the channel the outlet has not only been protected to some extent from the easterly drift, but the bar in front has been lowered by the scour produced by the discharge of the river following the concave bend of the southwest jetty. As the outer portion of this jetty was exposed to westerly storms from the Bay of Biscay before the outer harbour was constructed, it has been given the form and strength of a breakwater situated in shallow water.

== For berthing at docks ==
Where docks are given sloping sides, openwork timber jetties are generally carried across the slope, at the ends of which vessels can lie in deep water or more solid structures are erected over the slope for supporting coal-tips. Pilework jetties are also constructed in the water outside the entrances to docks on each side, so as to form an enlarging trumpet-shaped channel between the entrance, lock or tidal basin and the approach channel, in order to guide vessels in entering or leaving the docks. Solid jetties, moreover, lined with quay walls, are sometimes carried out into a wide dock, at right angles to the line of quays at the side, to enlarge the accommodation; and they also serve, when extended on a large scale from the coast of a tideless sea under shelter of an outlying breakwater, to form the basins in which vessels lie when discharging and taking in cargoes in such a port as Marseille.

== At entrances to jetty harbors ==
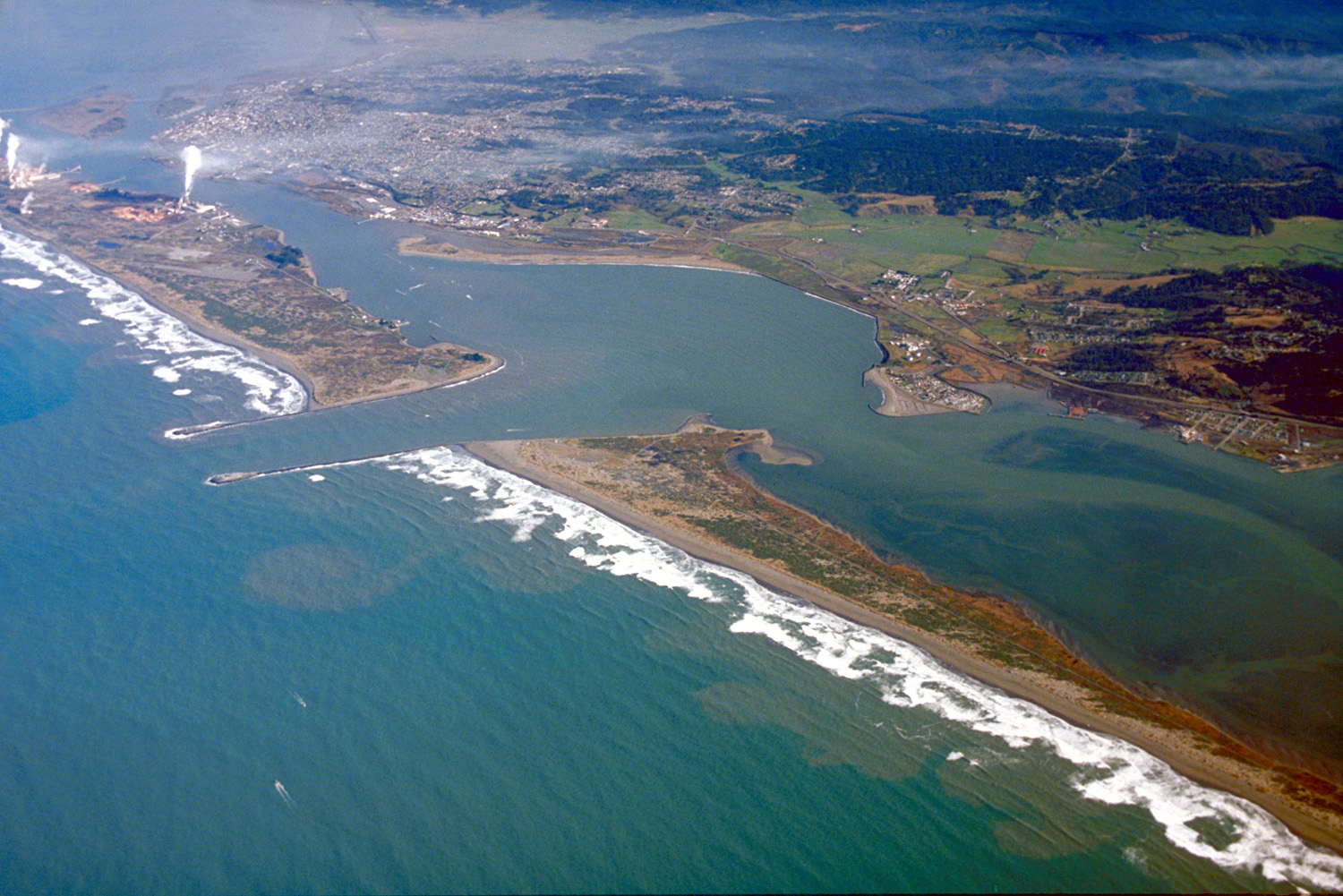
Aerial view of jetties, constructed of dolosse, at Humboldt Bay harbor entrance. These jetties mitigate unpredictable shifting sands.

The approach channel to some ports situated on sandy coasts is guided and protected across the beach by parallel jetties. In some cases, these are made solid up to a little above low water of neap tides, on which open timber-work is erected, provided with a planked platform at the top raised above the highest tides. In other cases, they consist entirely of solid material without timber-work. The channel between the jetties was originally maintained by tidal scour from low-lying areas close to the coast, and subsequently by the current from sluicing basins; but it is now often considerably deepened by sand-pump dredging. It is protected to some extent by the solid portion of the jetties from the inroad of sand from the adjacent beach, and from the levelling action of the waves; while the upper open portion serves to indicate the channel and to guide the vessels, if necessary (see harbor).

The bottom part of the older jetties, in such long-established jetty ports as Calais, Dunkirk and Ostend, was composed of clay or rubble stone, covered on the top by fascine-work or pitching, but the deepening of the jetty channel by dredging and the need that arose for its enlargement led to the reconstruction of the jetties at these ports. The new jetties at Dunkirk were founded in the sandy beach, by the aid of compressed air, at a depth of 22.75 feet (6.93 m) below low water of spring tides; and their solid masonry portion, on a concrete foundation was raised 50 feet (15 m). above low water of neap tides.

== At lagoon outlets ==
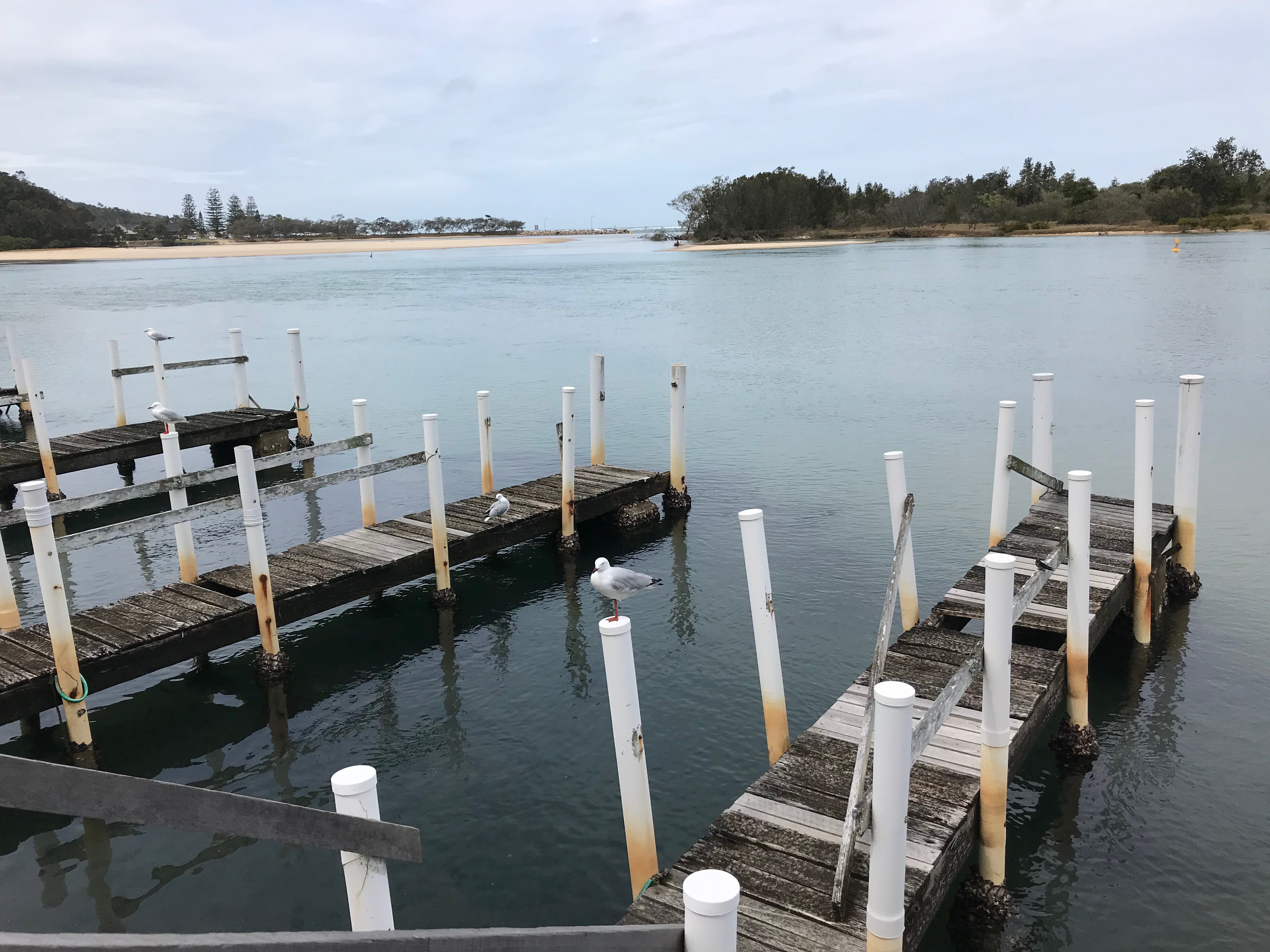
Private jetties near the mouth of the Nambucca River, New South Wales, Australia

A small tidal rise spreading tidal water over a large expanse of lagoon or inland backwater causes the influx and efflux of the tide to maintain a deep channel through a narrows no longer confined by a bank on each side, becomes dispersed, and owing to the reduction of its scouring force, is no longer able at a moderate distance from the shore effectually to resist the action of tending to form a continuous beach in front of the outlet. Hence a bar is produced that diminishes the available depth in the approach channel. By carrying out a solid jetty over the bar, however on each side of the outlet, the tidal currents are concentrated in the channel across the bar, and lower it by scour. Thus the available depth of the approach channels to Venice through the Malamocco and Lido outlets from the Venetian Lagoon have been deepened several feet (metres) over their bars by jetties of rubble, carried out across the foreshore into deep water on both sides of the channel.

Other examples are provided by the long jetties extended into the sea in front of the entrance to Charleston harbour, formerly constructed of fascines weighed down with stone and logs, but subsequently of rubble stone, and by the two converging rubble jetties carried out from each shore of Dublin Bay for deepening the approach to Dublin harbour.

Jetties have the adverse effect of endangering Surf Culture as a whole with their ability to destroy surf breaks.

== See also ==
- Breakwater
- Dock
- Groyne
- Jettied floors in medieval houses
- Mole
- Pier
- Port
- Spiral Jetty
- Wharf

== General references ==
- Humboldt Bay Management Plan: Section II–Chapter 2.0 • Humboldt Bay Harbor Setting (PDF) (Report). Humboldt Bay Harbor District. May 2007. pp. 71–88. Archived from the original (PDF) on 7 March 2008.
