= Cultura 365 =

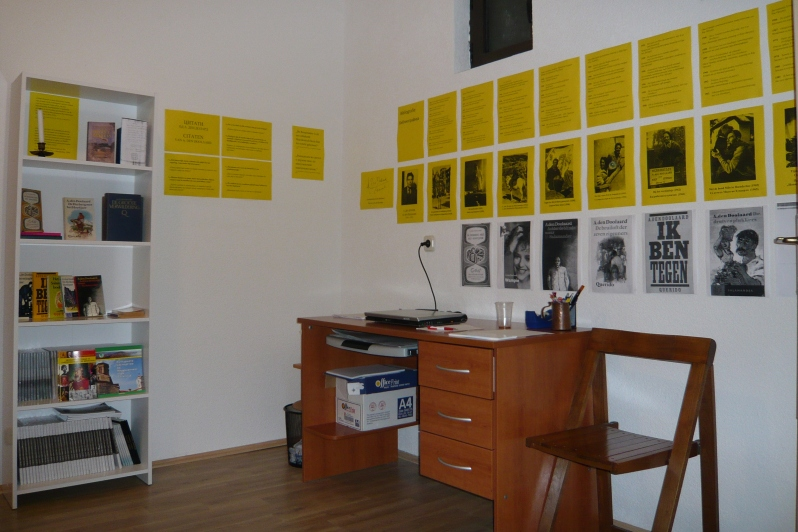
The Memorial Room for A. den Doolaard

Cultura 365 or Culture 365 (Macedonian: Култура 365) is a small cultural and information center in Ohrid, Republic of Macedonia.

== History ==
The center was established in 2011 by active participation of the Ohrid born writer and photographer Misho Yuzmeski. Very quickly the center becomes a cultural cult place of lovers of art and cultural figures from around the world. Guided by the principle "culture for all every day," the center is the only cultural institution in Ohrid which is open every day throughout the year, offering a wide range of cultural events.

Cultural and Information Center "Cultura 365" commenced operations on 19 June 2011, and the first cultural event is the opening of the memorial room for the Dutch writer and journalist A. den Doolaard.

== Activities ==
In "Cultura 365" are held various cultural events through which are promoted artists and other cultural figures.

"Cultura 365" has two exhibition rooms:

- Memorial Room (permanent exhibition of books and documents) for the Dutch writer A. den Doolaard
- Art gallery for displaying photos and other works by various authors

Basic activities of "Cultura 365" are:

- promotion of art (books, photographs, paintings, etc.).
- tourist information about the cultural heritage and cultural events in the city of Ohrid
- lectures on cultural heritage and other cultural topics
