= Henry Hay (writer) =

American journalist (1910–1985)

- Born: June Barrows; March 30, 1910
- Died: July 27, 1985 (aged 75)
- Occupations: Journalist and translator
- Known for: Writing about magic and sleight of hand

June Barrows Mussey (March 30, 1910 – July 27, 1985), who wrote under the pen name Henry Hay, was an American journalist and translator who is notable for his writing about magic, sleight of hand, and a large number of European authors including Lion Feuchtwanger.

He also was one of the anonymous translators of Hitler's Mein Kampf (1925–26) for an American edition by the publisher Stackpole Sons. Stackpole advertised that it paid "no royalties to Hitler" and later played up the fact that the publisher was donating a percentage of the proceeds to refugee relief. 12,000 copies were printed but Stackpole had to stop selling because of a legal battle with the publisher Houghton, Mifflin who had bought the American rights.

Mussey was born in New York and lived in West Germany after World War II. He was a friend of the famous coin manipulator Thomas Nelson Downs. His highly regarded The Amateur Magician's Handbook (1950) has gone through several editions and is still considered a standard reference work among magicians.

== Publications ==
- Magic (1942) as Barrows Mussey
- Learn Magic (1947) as Barrows Mussey
- Roll back the sea (1947, translator), as Barrows Mussey. The first English language edition of Het verjaagde water by A. den Doolaard.
- Mein Kampf: The First Complete and Unexpurgated Edition Published in the English Language by Adolf Hitler. Translated anonymously. Stackpole Sons, 1939.
- Cyclopedia of Magic (1949)
- The Amateur Magician's Handbook (1950)
- "The Devil in Boston: A Play about the Salem Witchcraft Trials in Three Acts (1948)" by Lion Feuchtwanger, translated by J. Barrows Mussey (ebook 2015)
