= Herman Arend Ferguson =

Dutch civil engineer and hydraulic engineer

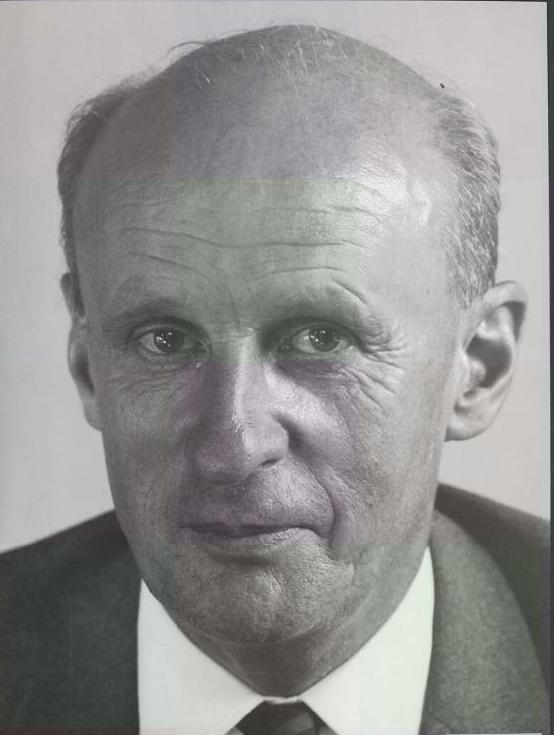
- Born: 25 February 1911; Voorburg, The Netherlands
- Died: 10 April 1997 (aged 86); Voorburg, The Netherlands
- Citizenship: Netherlands
- Education: Delft University of Technology
- Known for: Delta Works; Post-1953 flood recovery efforts Reclamation of Walcheren
- Awards: TU Delft honorary doctorate (1987); Order of the Netherlands Lion
- Scientific career
- Fields: Civil Engineering; Hydraulic Engineering
- Workplaces: Rijkswaterstaat

Herman Arend Ferguson (25 February 1911 – 10 April 1997) was a Dutch civil engineer and hydraulic engineer who contributed to water management in the Netherlands. He played a central role in the recovery efforts following the inundation of Walcheren in 1944, and the works to repair the significant damage caused by the North Sea flood of 1953. He held senior positions at Rijkswaterstaat, authored several key publications on hydraulic engineering, and was awarded the Order of the Netherlands Lion.

== Life and career ==
Herman Arend Ferguson was born on 25 February 1911 in Voorburg, the son of George Ferguson and Francesca Hermina van den Brandhof. He was of Scottish ancestry. He graduated in 1938 with a degree in Civil Engineering from Delft University of Technology. After graduation, he joined Rijkswaterstaat (the Dutch Directorate-General for Public Works and Water Management), where he was employed in the Studiedienst (Study Department) of the Directie Benedenrivieren (Directorate for the Lower Rivers).

During 1945–46, Ferguson was part of the Dienst Droogmaking Walcheren (Service for the Reclamation of Walcheren), which was established to oversee the reclamation of the island of Walcheren after the intentional inundation of the island during World War II. The character Rafelding in the non-fiction novel Het verjaagde water by A. den Doolaard is based on Ferguson.

Afterwards, Ferguson moved to Vlissingen and worked for Rijkswaterstaat's Dienst Dijkherstel Zeeland (Service for Dike Repair Zeeland) following the North Sea flood of 1953. He became head of the Waterloopkundige Afdeling (Hydraulic Engineering Division) of the Delta Service from 1956 to 1960, and subsequently headed the Rotterdamse Waterweg arrondissement (Rotterdam Waterway District). Ferguson was appointed Chief Engineering Director of the Directie Benedenrivieren (Directorate for the Lower Rivers, 1962–1969) and later of the Delta Service (1969–1976), where he contributed to significant water engineering projects, including the Delta Works and the improvement of the Nieuwe Waterweg.

Ferguson was deeply involved in the design and construction of the Haringvliet sluices, which were critical for water flow regulation and flood protection in the Rhine-Meuse-Scheldt Delta. He also contributed to the closure of tidal inlets including the Haringvliet and Brouwershavense Gat, major Delta Works schemes which were required to ensure that flood risks were mitigated.

== Publications ==
Ferguson authored and contributed to numerous technical reports and publications over his career, including:

- Benedenrivieren in de jaren zestig: persoonlijke herinneringen van een hoofdingenieur-directeur (Lower Rivers in the 1960s: Personal Memories of a Chief Engineer-Director, 1995)
- Dialoog met de Noordzee (Dialogue with the North Sea, 1991), an exploration of the influence of human intervention on the Dutch Delta.
- Delta-visie: een terugblik op veertig jaar natte waterbouw in Zuidwest Nederland (Delta Vision: A Retrospective on Forty Years of Hydraulic Engineering in Southwest Netherlands, 1988)
- De Nederlandse delta: een compromis tussen milieu en techniek in de strijd tegen het water (The Dutch Delta: A Compromise Between Environment and Technique in the Battle Against Water, 1983)
- Zes-baksduwvaart: een studie naar algemene en nautische aspekten (Six-Barge Push Towage: A Study of General and Nautical Aspects, 1983)
- The Netherlands Delta Project: Problems and lessons (1972)
- Nota over de concentratie van waterbouwkundige werken in een aparte dienst (Note on the Concentration of Hydraulic Engineering Works in a Separate Service, 1972)
- De waterstaatkundige veranderingen in Deltagebied en hun invloed op het Waterstaatsbeheer (Hydrological Changes in the Delta Region and Their Impact on Water Management, 1965)
- Golfonderzoek in het deltagebied (Wave Research in the Delta Region, 1959)
- Waterloopkundig onderzoek voor ontwerp en uitvoering der sluitgaten in de deltadammen (Hydraulic Research for the Design and Construction of Closure Gaps in the Delta Dams, 1958)
- De zoutbeweging op de Rotterdamsche Waterweg in het bijzonder bij geringe opperwater-afvoer (Salt Movement on the Rotterdam Waterway Especially During Low Surface Water Discharge, 1957)
- Herstellings- en verbeteringswerken na de ramp van 1 februari 1953 (Restoration and Improvement Works After the Disaster of 1 February 1953, 1954)
- Verslag over de toestand der oevers en stranden in Zeeland 1951 VI: oevers langs Keeten, Mastgat en Zijpe (Report on the Condition of Banks and Beaches in Zeeland 1951 VI: Banks Along Keeten, Mastgat, and Zijpe, 1953)
- Verslag over de waarnemingen met de "Oceaan" in het mondingsgebied van de Westerschelde (Report on Observations with the "Ocean" in the Mouth Area of the Western Scheldt, 1943)
- Inleiding tot de getijberekening (Introduction to Tide Calculation, 1943).

Most of these publications are maintained in electronic format by the Rijkswaterstaat archive.

== Awards ==
Ferguson was awarded the Order of the Netherlands Lion, and his contributions to the scientific underpinning of the Delta Works Plan earned him an honorary doctorate from Delft University of Technology in 1987.

== See also ==
- Delta Works
- Flood control in the Netherlands
- Rijkswaterstaat
