= Kees d'Angremond =

Dutch civil engineer and professor of coastal engineering

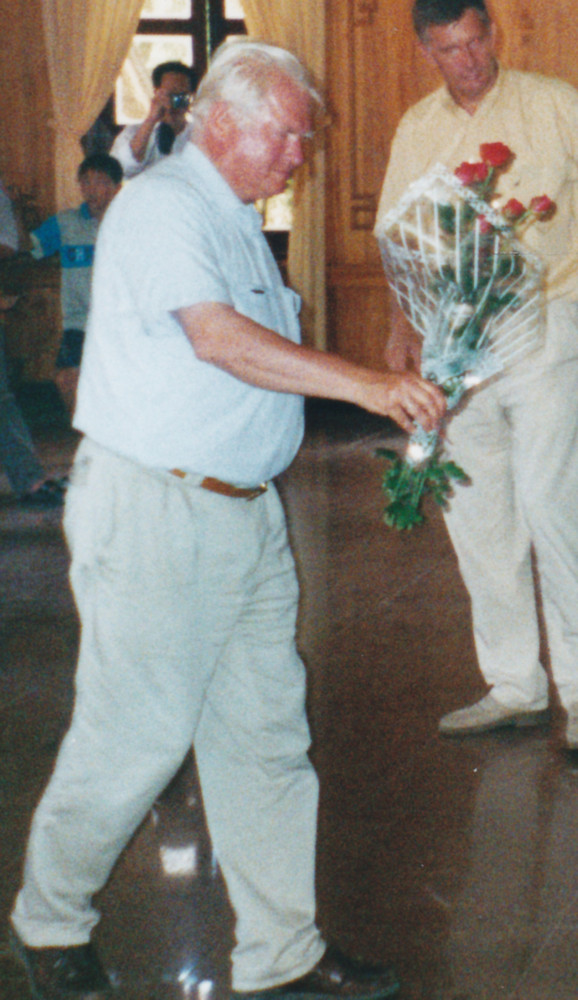
- d'Angremond in 2001
- Born: September 18, 1939; Amsterdam, Netherlands
- Died: August 15, 2024 (aged 84); Amstelveen, Netherlands
- Known for: Eastern Scheldt storm surge barrier; Singapore land reclamation (Pulau Tekong)

Academic work
- Discipline: Coastal engineering
- Institutions: Delft University of Technology

Kees d’Angremond (18 September 1939 – 15 August 2024) was a Dutch civil engineer and professor of coastal engineering at Delft University of Technology (1989–2001). He contributed to the design and execution of the Eastern Scheldt storm surge barrier, led the Department of Hydraulic Engineering and Geotechnics at TU Delft, and was Dean of the Faculty of Civil Engineering and Geosciences from 1996 to 1998. Internationally, he worked on dredging and reclamation projects in Asia, advised the government of Singapore on the polder reclamation of Pulau Tekong, and supervised training programmes in Vietnam. He was also a mentor to Crown Prince Willem-Alexander during his studies in water management.

D’Angremond published widely on dredging and coastal engineering, including articles in Terra et Aqua on the 1953 North Sea flood and on the challenges of megaprojects. He was decorated as an officer of the Order of Orange-Nassau, chaired the National Dredging Museum in Sliedrecht, and in 2024 a navigation buoy at the Port of Singapore was named in his honour.

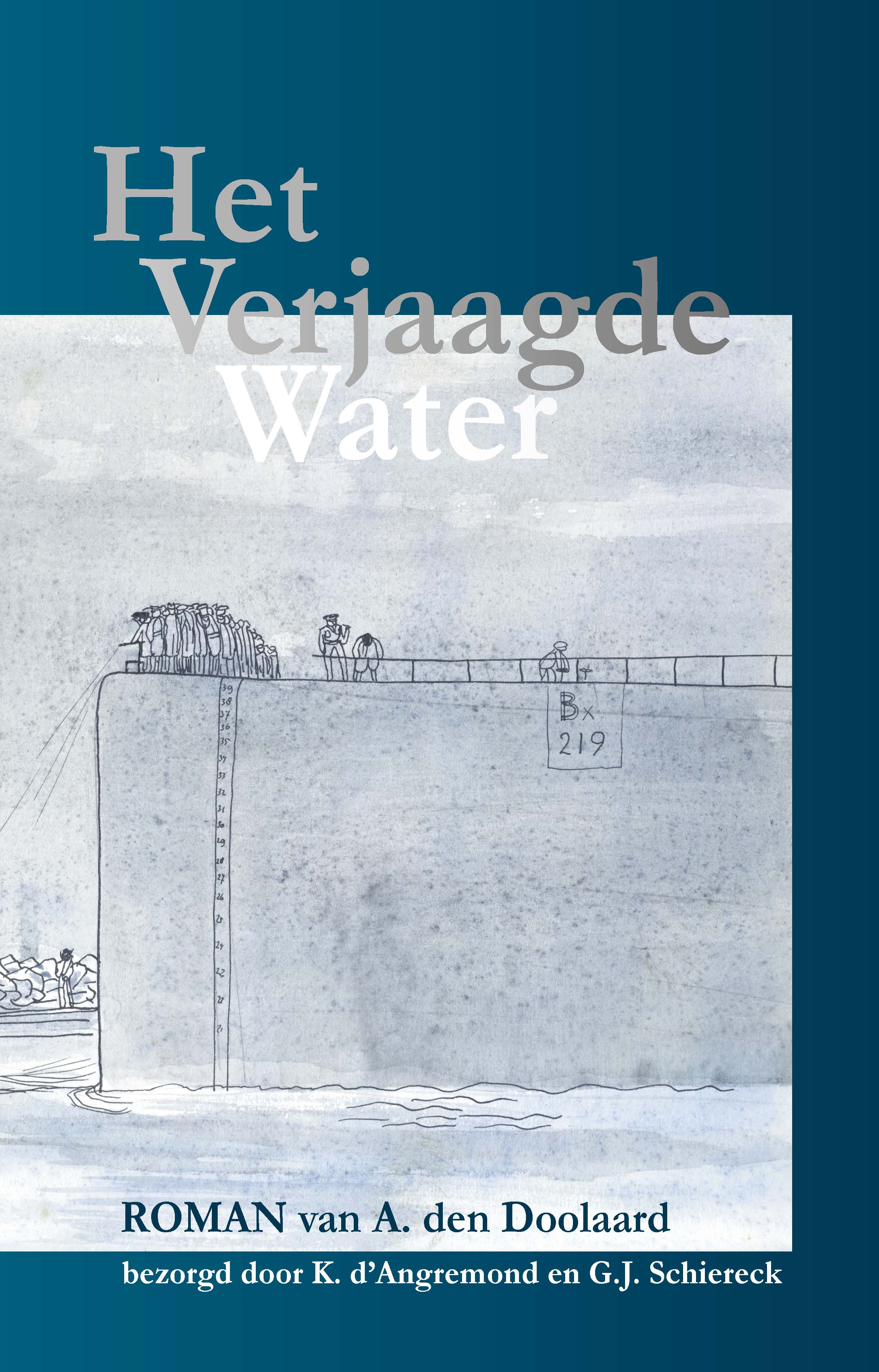
Cover of the 2001 edition of Het Verjaagde Water

== Early life and education ==
D’Angremond was born in Amsterdam in 1939. He originally hoped to become a pilot but was not accepted for training and instead studied civil engineering at TU Delft, graduating as a hydraulic engineer in 1963.

== Career ==
=== Delft Hydraulics and Volker Stevin ===
After graduation he joined the Waterloopkundig Laboratorium (now Deltares), working on projects including the construction of the Eastern Scheldt barrier. Through the Dutch organisation Nedeco he also participated in international assignments, including irrigation projects in India.

From 1975 to 1987 he was employed by dredging company Volker Stevin, where he directed projects in India, Burma and Singapore and helped establish the engineering consultancy Aveco. He became Director for Europe and the Far East in 1980 and worked on the Oosterschelde storm surge barrier through the Dosbouw construction consortium.

=== Port of Amsterdam and TU Delft ===
Between 1987 and 1989 d’Angremond was managing director of the Municipal Port Authority of Amsterdam. In 1989 he returned to TU Delft as professor of coastal engineering, succeeding Eco Bijker. He chaired the Department of Hydraulic Engineering and Geotechnics and was dean of the faculty from 1996 to 1998. His teaching emphasised practical design skills and he co-authored revised course materials on coastal structures, including breakwaters. He retired in 2001 but remained active as emeritus professor and consultant.

== International work ==
=== Vietnam ===
At the request of the Vietnamese government, d’Angremond led a training programme in coastal engineering for Vietnamese engineers. Conducted with IHE Delft under the Nuffic framework, the project trained many students from Hanoi Water Resources University (later Thuyloi University) and contributed to the establishment of a faculty of coastal engineering there.

=== Singapore ===
From the 1990s d’Angremond advised the Singapore government on dredging and reclamation. He was a member of a joint expert panel that mediated disputes between Singapore and Malaysia over land reclamation and later guided the Pulau Tekong polder project, which avoided the need for sand imports from neighbouring states. He continued in this role until his death, and in March 2024 delivered a lecture on the project at the National Dredging Museum in Sliedrecht.

== Public service ==
In 1984 d’Angremond was appointed to the Dutch committee on soil subsidence caused by gas extraction in the north of the Netherlands. He also studied subsidence in the Groot-Mijdrecht polder.

He acted as a mentor to Crown Prince Willem-Alexander during his studies in water management at IHE Delft in the late 1990s, and the prince attended his farewell symposium in 2001. D'Angremond also played a leading role in the Koninklijk Instituut van Ingenieurs (Royal Netherlands Society of Engineers), chairing its Construction and Hydraulic Engineering section and co-founding the annual Waterbouwdag (Hydraulic Engineering Day).

== Publications ==
D’Angremond authored and co-authored numerous books and articles on coastal engineering and dredging. He prepared, with G. J. Schiereck, an annotated TU Delft edition of Het verjaagde water by A. den Doolaard, showing from archival and technical evidence that the novel closely tracks the real-life events and people involved in the 1944–46 Walcheren dike closures. The updated edition was issued by Delft Academic Press (2001) and later VSSD (2010).

Some of his selected works include:

- d’Angremond, Kees (2004). Breakwaters and Closure Dams. Spon. ISBN 9780415332569.
- Den Doolaard, A. (2010). d’Angremond, Kees; Schiereck, G.J. (eds.). Het verjaagde water [The chased water] (in Dutch) (Annotated ed.). VSSD.
- d'Angremond, Kees (March 2003). "From Disaster to Delta Project: The Storm Flood of 1953" (PDF). Terra et Aqua (90).
- d'Angremond, Kees (September 2010). "The Changing Maritime Industry: The Impact of Megaprojects on the Workforce" (PDF). Terra et Aqua (120).

== Honours ==
D’Angremond was appointed an officer in the Order of Orange-Nassau. A navigation buoy at the entrance of Singapore harbour was named after him in 2024 in recognition of his contributions to coastal engineering.
