= Mišo Juzmeski =

Macedonian writer (1966–2021)

Misho Yuzmeski
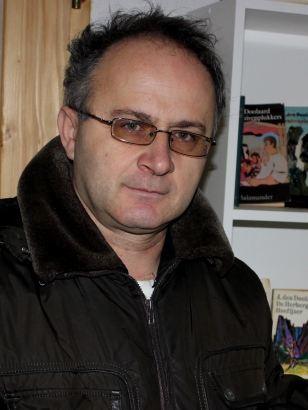
- Born: 7 April 1966; Ohrid; Republic of Macedonia
- Died: 30 April 2021 (aged 55); Ohrid; North Macedonia
- Occupations: Author, photographer

Misho Yuzmeski (Macedonian: Мишо Јузмески / Misho Juzmeski or (older form) Mišo Juzmeski), (Ohrid, Republic of Macedonia, 7 April 1966 – 30 April 2021) was a Macedonian writer, publisher and photographer.

== Biography ==
Misho Yuzmeski worked as a guide, travel agent and interpreter. Besides his native Macedonian, he speaks several European languages: Bulgarian, Dutch, German, English, French, Italian, Serbian, and Spanish.

In 1992 he participated in the work of the first private radio station in Ohrid. In the radio, he worked nearly two years as editor and presenter of shows. In the same year he had an encounter with the photographer Atanas Talevski. Their meeting led to an intensive long-term cooperation in the field of photographic art. Both in 2007 founded the first photo gallery in Elšani. Moreover, Talevski's photos can be seen in printed publications authored by Yuzmeski who for many years was the organizer of his photo exhibitions. The experience from this cooperation helps Yuzmeski to develop his own photographic career.

Besides photography, Yuzmeski has been involved in writing and publishing. He writes short stories, essays and criticism. He is author of several books of prose, as well as publications in the fields of tourism and culture. Yuzmeski is member of the editorial boards of Narodna Volya (issued by the Macedonian community in Bulgaria) and Branuvanya (published in Struga, Republic of Macedonia). His short stories and essays have appeared in a number Macedonian (Sovremenost, Veles, Ohridski Novini, Branuvanya) and foreign periodicals.

In June 2011 in Ohrid, Yuzmeski founded the Cultural Centre "Cultura 365". Here he actively supports other photographers in the promotion of their art work, and keeps from oblivion the names and the work of other Macedonian authors.

On 19 June 2011, in "Cultura 365", a memorial room was opened, dedicated to the Dutch writer A. den Doolaard with an exhibition of books and documents, organized by Yuzmeski. He has also published articles on the role of den Doolaard in the development of the Dutch-Macedonian relations.

== Prizes ==
- 2020 – OhridNews Recognition for Cultural and Tourist Promotion of Ohrid for the book Explore Ohrid

== Bibliography ==
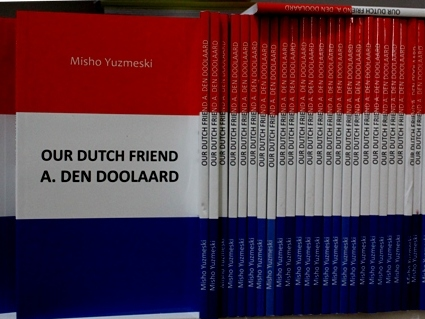
Our Dutch Friend A. den Doolaard on sale in a bookstore in Ohrid, Macedonia

- Premin vo maglata (Skopje, 2005) ISBN 9989-9744-5-4
  - English translation: A Passage through the Fog, (Ohrid, 2009) ISBN 978-9989-911-01-9
  - Bulgarian translation: Проход в мъглата (Melnik, 2010) ISBN 978-954-447-016-6
- Neka bide svetlina (Let there be light) – essays (Blagoevgrad, 2005)
- Pofalni slova (Words of praise) – essays (Blagoevgrad, 2006)
- Ohridskite biseri / The Pearls of Ohrid – coauthor with Nikola Pavleski (Ohrid, 2007) ISBN 978-9989-2688-0-9
- Elshani – zhivot megu kamenot i vodata (Elshani – Life between rocks and water) – monograph (Elshani, 2009)
- Nashiot holandski prijatel A. den Dolard – monograph (Ohrid, 2012) ISBN 978-9989-911-41-5
  - English translation:Our Dutch friend A. den Doolaard (Ohrid, 2012) ISBN 978-9989-911-49-1
  - Dutch translation: Onze Nederlandse vriend A. den Doolaard (Ohrid, 2013) ISBN 978-9989-911-56-9
- Sto godini kopnezh (One Hundred Years of Yearning) – short stories (Ohrid, 2013) ISBN 978-9989-911-62-0
- Makedontsi, A. den Dolard i drugi Holangyani (Macedonians, A. den Doolaard and other Dutch People) – monograph (Ohrid, 2016) – ISBN 978-9989-911-93-4
  - Dutch translation: Macedoniërs, A. den Doolaard en andere Nederlanders (Ohrid, 2016) ISBN 978-9989-911-95-8
- Explore Ohrid – travel guide (Ohrid, 2020) – ISBN 978-608-4836-40-7

== Exhibitions ==
- Group Exhibitions
  - Ohrid (Macedonia), 2000 – group exhibition at Cultural Center "Grigor Prlichev"
- Individual exhibitions
  - Elshani (Macedonia), July 2008 – January 2010 – individual exhibition in the Elshani Photo Gallery
  - Melnik (Bulgaria), 03 – 13. 10. 2008 – individual exhibition in the "Kordopulovata" house
  - Burgas (Bulgaria), 11 – 27. 05 2011 – individual exhibition at the Regional Library "P. K. Yavorov"
  - Ohrid (Macedonia), 2011 – individual exhibition at Cultural Centre "Cultura 365"
  - Ohrid (Macedonia), 2012 – individual exhibition at Cultural Centre "Cultura 365"
  - Bitola (Macedonia), 2013 – individual exhibition in The Bitola Cultural Centre
  - Ohrid (Macedonia), 2013 – individual exhibition at Cultural Centre "Cultura 365"
  - Prilep (Macedonia), 2014 – individual exhibition
