= Het verjaagde water =

1947 Dutch book about the reclamation of Walcheren

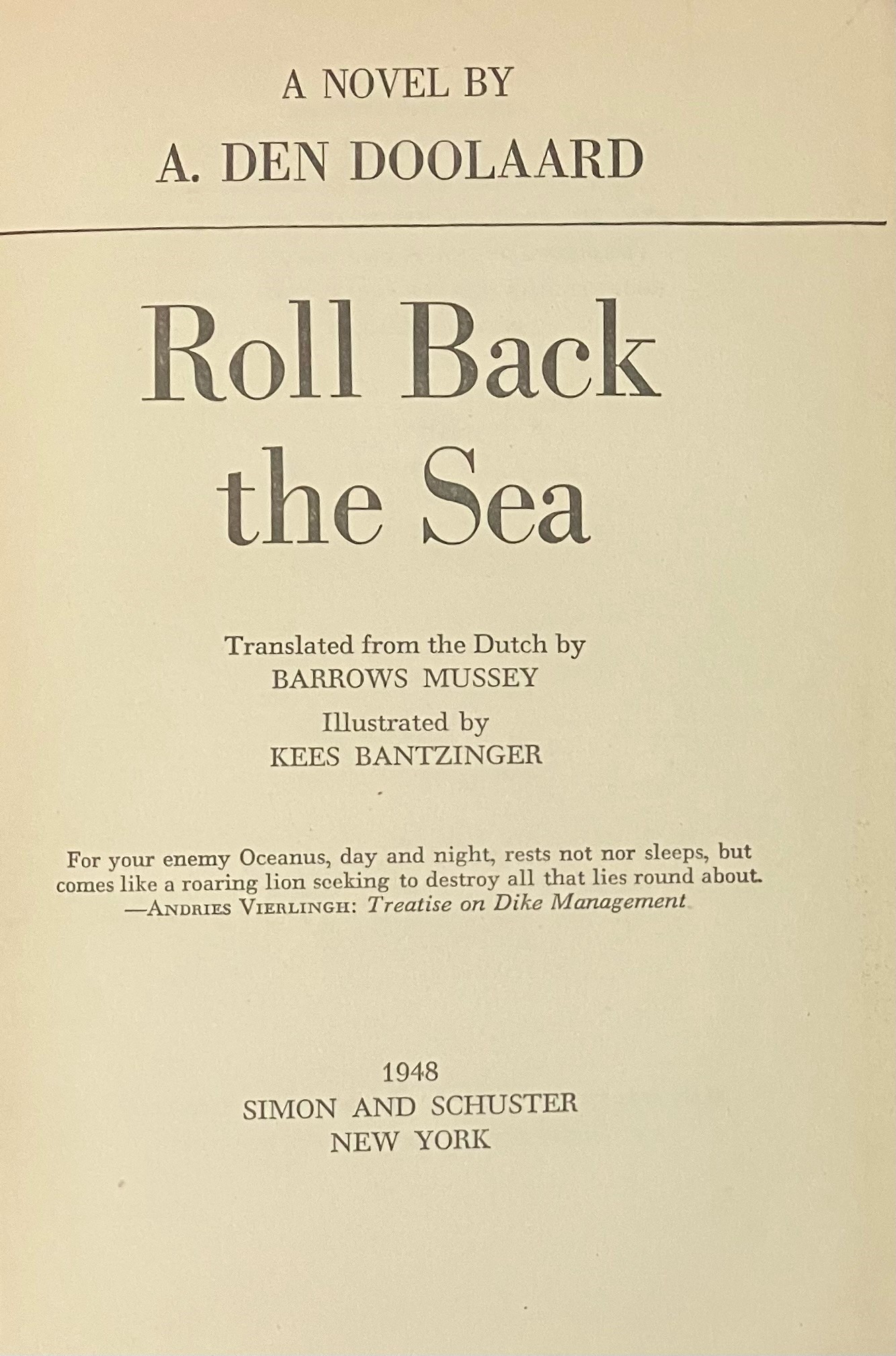
- Inside cover of the first English translation by June Barrows Mussey (Henry Hay), published as Roll back the sea by Simon and Schuster in 1948
- Author: A. den Doolaard
- Language: Dutch
- Genre: Non-fiction novel
- Publisher: N.V. Em. Querido Uitgeversmaatschappij, Amsterdam
- Publication date: 1947
- Publication place: Netherlands
- Media type: Hardback
- Pages: 526 pages

Het verjaagde water (The chased water) is a 1947 Dutch non-fiction novel written by A. den Doolaard, which gives an account of the recovery works to repair dike breaches after the October 1944 Inundation of Walcheren as part of operations by The Allies of World War II during Operation Infatuate. Researchers from Delft University of Technology have found high levels of historical accuracy in den Doolaard's descriptions of the events that took place, the methods used to close the dikes and the key people involved. Den Doolaard assigned pseudonyms to most of the main characters and organisations. The name A. den Doolaard is also a pseudonym, the author’s real name being Cornelis Johannes George Spoelstra Jr.

== Context ==
In October 1944, several dikes surrounding the Dutch island of Walcheren were bombed by the Allies at strategic locations including Westkapelle, Vlissingen, and Fort Rammekens in order to deliberately flood the island. The bombings created major gaps in the dikes at four primary locations, breaching the coastal defences against The North Sea and allowing seawater to flow unchecked into inhabited areas of land. Whilst the bombings achieved the immediate military objective of forcing a retreat of the occupying forces of Nazi Germany, who had used Walcheren to control the Western Scheldt and access to The Port of Antwerp, the subsequent flooding caused by the breaches had profound effects on the island infrastructure and local population.

The novel describes the subsequent efforts to repair the breaches in the dikes and reclaim Walcheren from the sea. The works were completed by a number of Dutch contractors, including some contractors from the Maatschappij tot Uitvoering van Zuiderzeewerken who had gained appropriate previous experience whilst constructing the Zuiderzee works.

Difficulties in commencing the rehabilitation works included the fact that many dredgers were still located in areas of the occupied Netherlands, and around 25% of the Dutch dredging fleet had been confiscated and transported to Germany. Works at the main breach locations were divided up between four contractors as shown in the table below.

Contractors appointed to the Walcheren reclamation works
Dike breach site	Contractor
The Nolledijk	Bos en Kalis
Westkapelle	Hollandse Aanneming Maatschappij (HAM)
Veere	Adriaan Volker
Rammekens	Van Hattum en Blankevoort

By October 1945, the contractors and Rijkswaterstaat had managed to assemble a fleet of 14 suction dredgers and bucket dredgers, 135 barges, 61 tugboats, 73 landing craft, 19 floating cranes, 52 bulldozers and draglines along with motor vehicles and other equipment. Difficulties in sourcing adequate materials and the sheer scale of the works during an emergency wartime situation led to innovative use of improvised materials and equipment, such as the Phoenix caissons used in the closure of the dike gaps, which had previously been used as Mulberry harbours during the Allied invasion of Normandy. Den Doolaard describes the initial reluctance of some of the contractors to use these units; however, their implementation was so successful that similar units would later be used on the closure of the Brielse Maasdam in 1950 and the Braakman in 1952.

Den Doolaard drew on his experiences as a liaison officer with the Dienst Droogmaking Walcheren (Service for Reclamation of Walcheren) to write the novel.

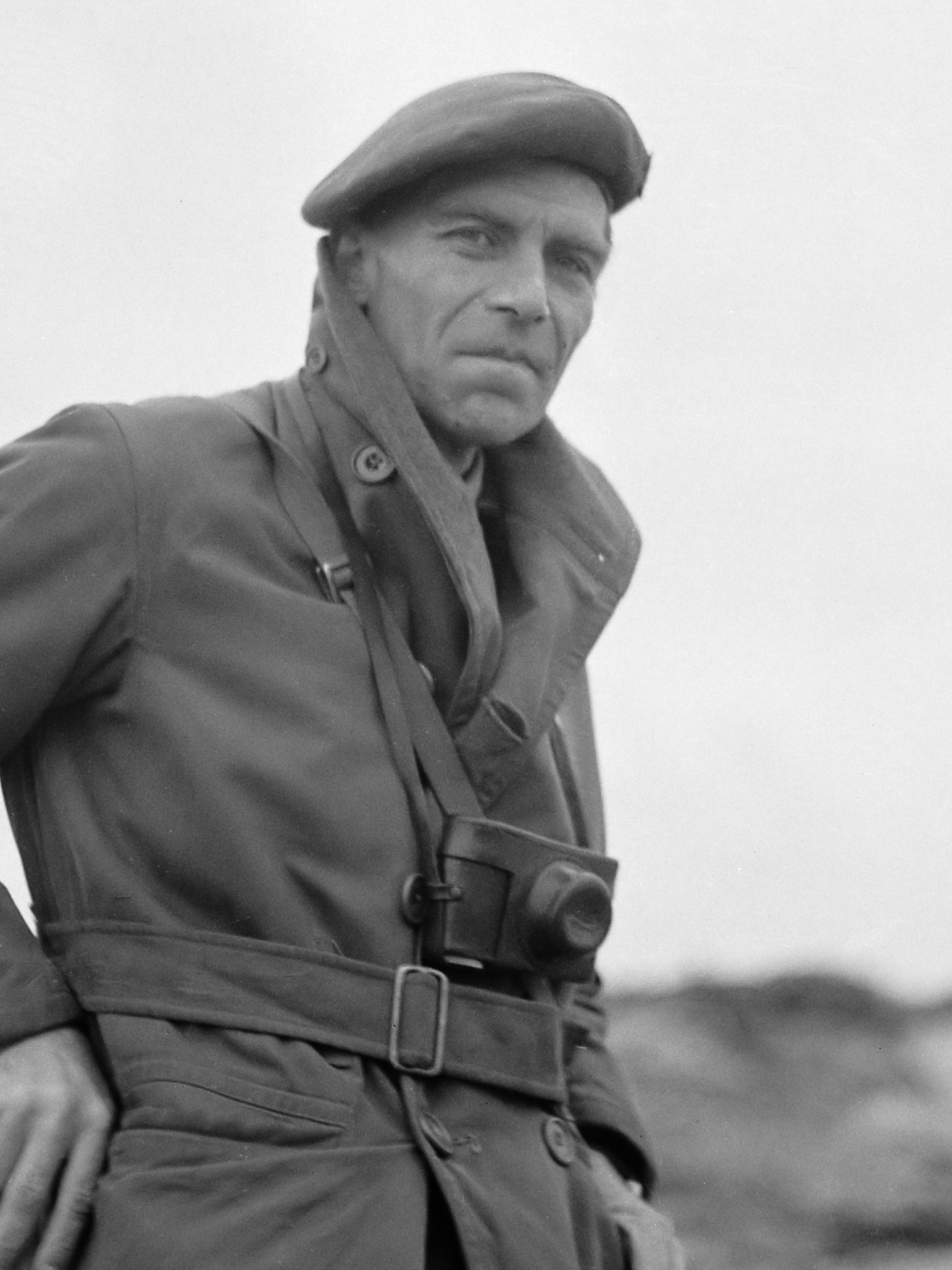
A. Den Doolaard (Cornelis Johannes George Spoelstra Jr.) pictured at the works to close the Nolle dike gap in Vlissingen in 1945.

== Editions ==
The original Dutch edition of Het verjaagde water appeared in 1947, published by Em. Querido's Uitgeverij in Amsterdam. It was reprinted in 1958 by the same publisher. An updated edition with annotations by Professor K. d'Angremond and GJ Schiereck was published by Delft Academic Press in 2001. The book has also been translated into a number of languages, including German, Danish, Swedish, Norwegian, Serbian, French, Czech and Hungarian.

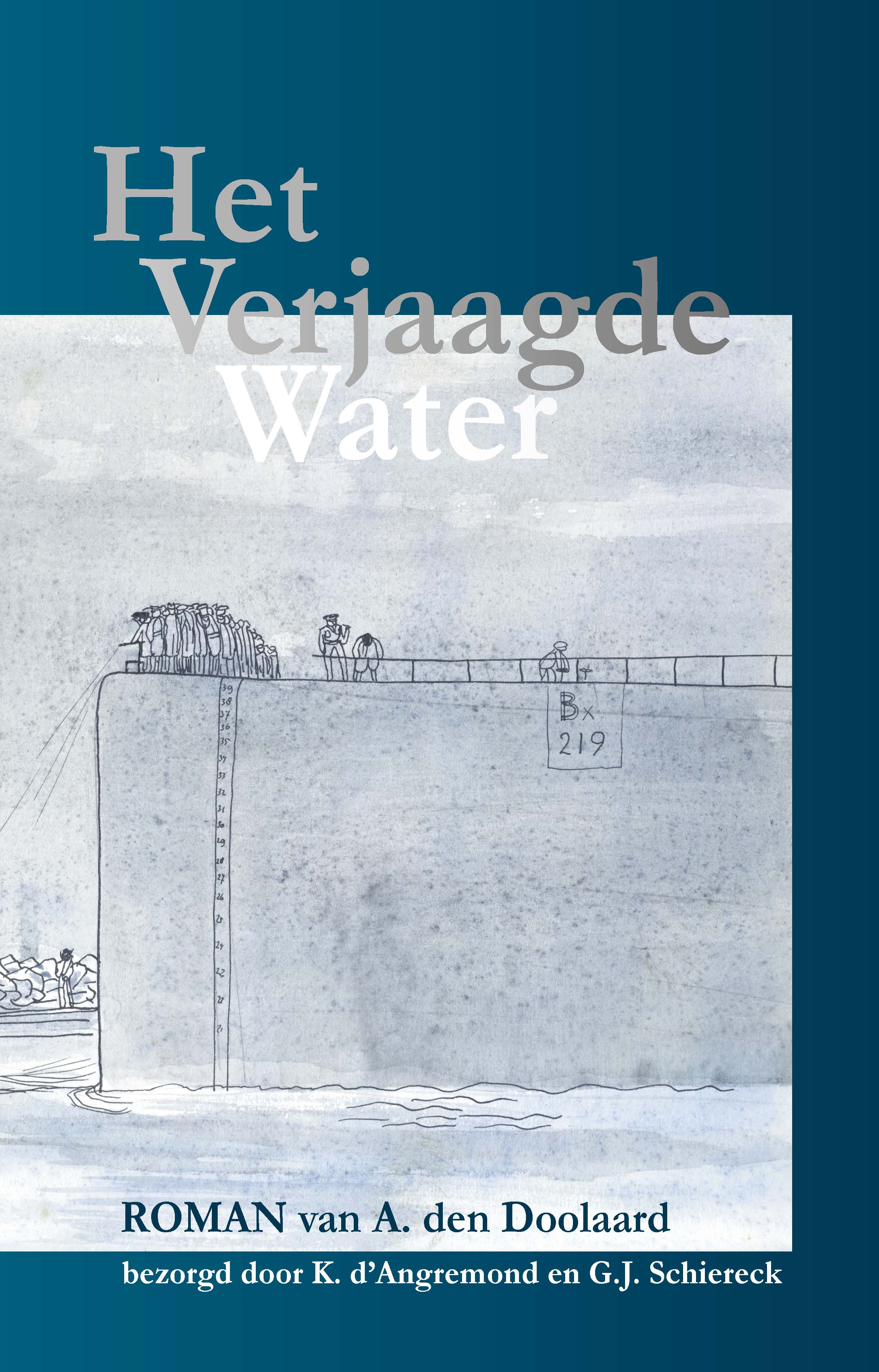
Cover page of the 2001 Dutch edition, which was published with annotations by Professor K. d'Angremond and G.J. Schiereck of Delft University of Technology

An English translation entitled Roll back the sea by June Barrows Mussey, with original illustrations by Cees Bantzinger, was published in New York in 1948 by Simon and Schuster and in London and Melbourne in 1949 by Heinemann (publisher).

== Content ==
Both the original 1947 publication and the subsequent 1948 English translation by Barrows Mussey consist of five books and twenty-five chapters. The table below gives the title of each chapter, from both the Dutch and English versions.

Books and chapters in Het verjaagde water/Roll back the sea
Book (Chapter)	1947 Dutch edition (Het verjaagde water)	1948 English translation (Roll back the sea)
1 (1)	De watertovenaars	The water wizards
1 (2)	Zuidzee en Noordzee	South Sea and North Sea
1 (3)	Het water komt	The water comes
1 (4)	De preek	The sermon
1 (5)	Het spookeiland	The ghost islands
1 (6)	Doen of niet doen?	To do or not to do
2 (7)	Wie een boot heeft, heeft de wereld	The man that has a boat has the world
2 (8)	Van Hummel's zwarte boekje	Van Hummel's little black book
2 (9)	Anton Hijnssen gaat uit roeien	Anton Hynssen goes rowing
2 (10)	Van Hummel's zwarte boekje (ii)	Van Hummel's little black book II
2 (11)	De baggervloot vaart uit	The dredging fleet puts out
2 (12)	De rijswerkers	The fascine workers
3 (13)	Walcheren omhoog	Up with Walcheren!
3 (14)	Klei tegen water	Clay against water
3 (15)	Kraan zeven	Crane 7
3 (16)	Beton tegen klei	Concrete against clay
3 (17)	Anton Hijnssen verovert Vlissingen	Anton Hynssen conquers Flushing
4 (18)	Westkapelle	Westkapelle
4 (19)	De scharesliep	The joker with the idea
4 (20)	De brug over de afgrond	The bridge over the chasm
5 (21)	De vuist van de reus	The giant's fist
5 (22)	Het water loopt weg	The water runs away
5 (23)	Het boze gat van Rammekens	The wicked gap at Rammekens
5 (24)	Phoenix	Phoenix
5 (25)	De eeuwige strijd	The everlasting battle

Barrows Mussey's 1948 English translation uses literal translations of each chapter from the original Dutch, with the exception of chapter 19 which uses The joker with the idea as a translation of the Dutch term de scharesliep, a term used to describe a peddler tradesperson who sharpens knives. Den Doolaard uses scharesliep in a pejorative sense. The chapter title refers to the character Berend Bonkelaar's use of the term to express his incredulity at a particular method put forward for carrying out the dike repair works by an officer of Supreme Headquarters Allied Expeditionary Force.

In chapters 9 and 17, Anton Hijnssen's surname is translated as Hynssen, with the Dutch IJ (digraph) being anglicised to Y.

== Historical accuracy ==
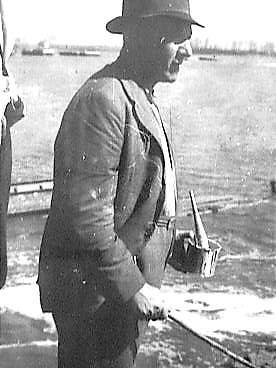
J.J. 'Kobus' Kalis, director and part owner of the Bos & Kalis company, photographed by den Doolaard. In the novel, the character of Berend Bonkelaar is based on Kalis.

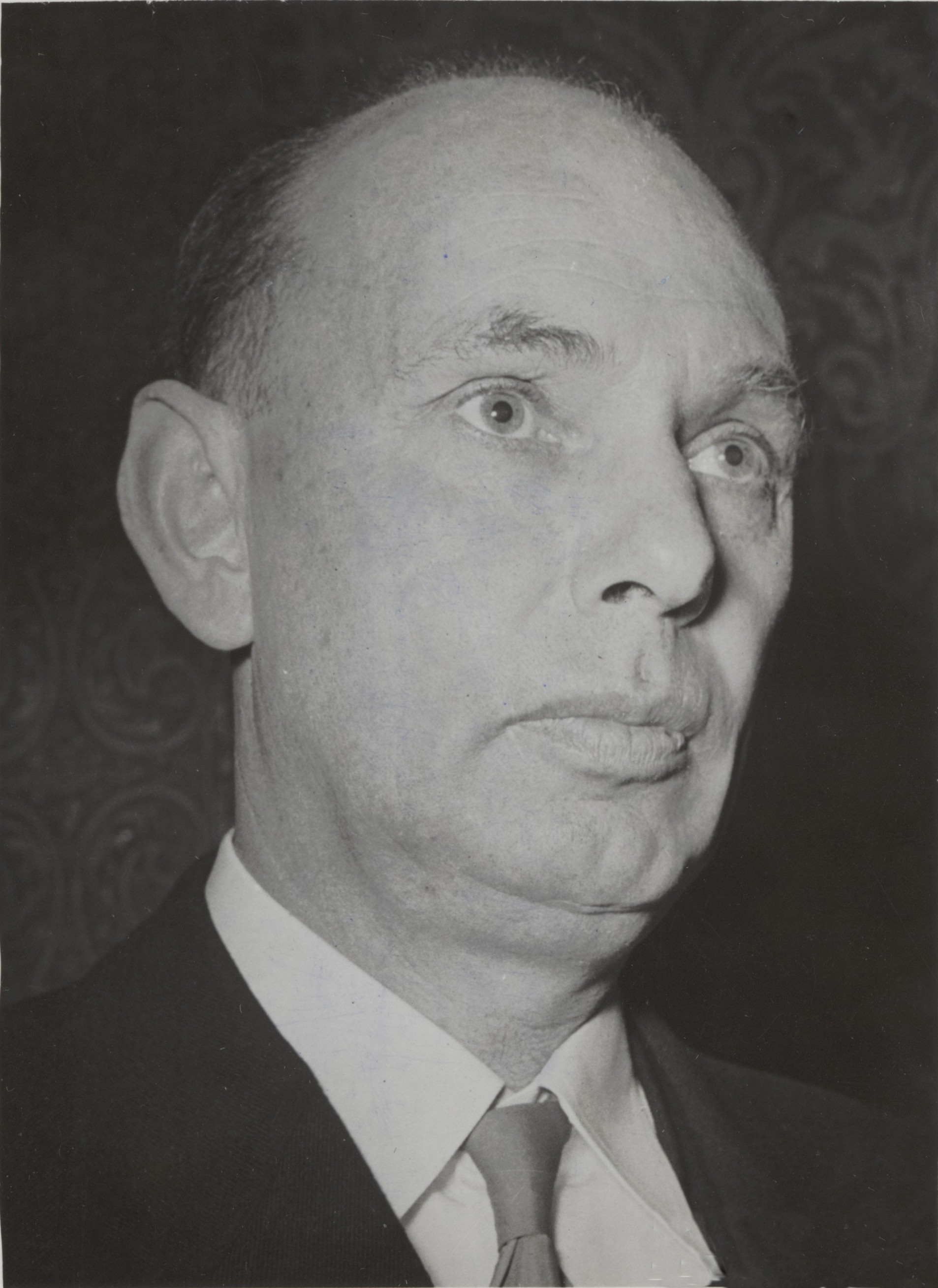
Professor P. Ph. Jansen (van Hummel).

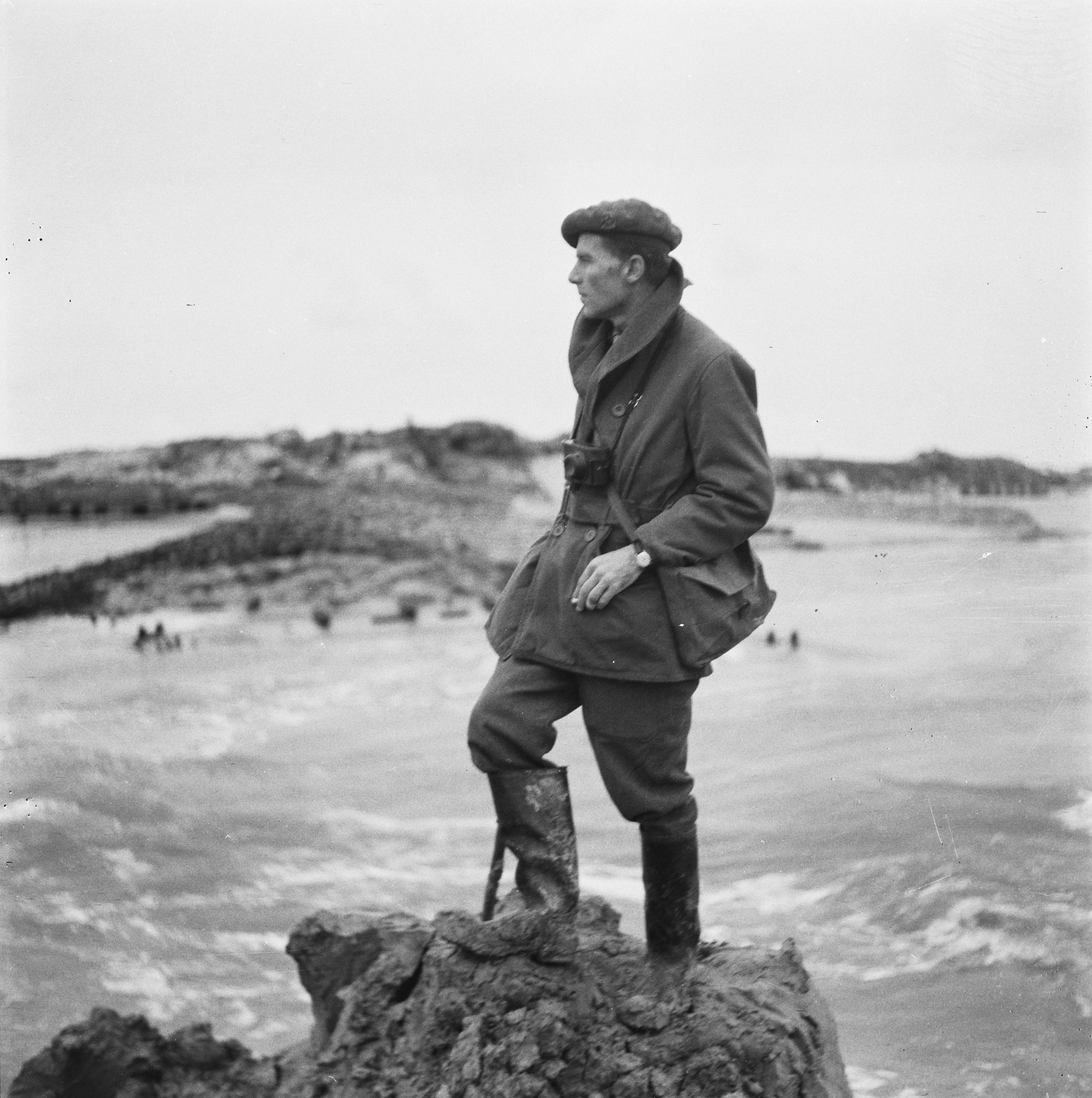
Den Doolaard at the closure of the Nolledijk.

For the 2001 reissue of the book, professor Kees D'Angremond and his colleague Gerrit-Jan Schiereck from Delft University of Technology undertook eight years of research around the characters in the book and the events described in it, with two of their graduate students investigating the accuracy of den Doolaard's representation of the technical aspects of the Walcheren reclamation. Their findings were included as annotations in the book and confirmed the high levels of accuracy in den Doolaard's descriptions of the people, events and technical aspects of the hydraulic engineering methods implemented, including the use of caissons, Phoenix breakwaters and torpedo nets.

The true identities of many of the characters in the novel were revealed by the research, with biographical details added as appendices to the 2001 edition. The characters included den Doolard's depiction of protagonists such as the distinguished civil engineer and professor, Pieter Philippus Jansen (represented by the character Van Hummel), many senior Rijkswaterstaat officials, the charismatic dredging boss Berend Bonkelaar (den Doolaard's pseudonym for J.J. 'Kobus' Kalis, a founding director of the Boskalis company), and Klaas Otterkop, the pseudonym of fascine mattress construction foreman Gerrit Visser of Gebroeders Van Oord, who supervised the installation of 36 fascine mattresses over a total area of 52,700 square metres during the work.

The table below provides information on many of the characters and organisations in the novel arising from d'Angremond and Schiereck's research.

Identities of the real-life characters and organisations in the novel
Name in the novel	Real name	Note
Berend Bonkelaar	Jacobus Johannis (J.J.) Kalis (Kobus Kalis)	Director and part owner of the Bos & Kalis dredging company.
Dankers	J.A.A. Mol	Supervisor for the water board of Walcheren.
Destrooper	Ackermans & van Haaren	Belgian contractor. In the novel, they sign a contract to provide a bucket dredger early in the works, which van Hummel laments is subsequently delayed for lack of a tugboat.
Brigadier Fowles	Brigadier E.E. Read CBE MC	Senior officer with SHAEF.
Glimmelmans	W. Metzelaar	Became a member of the Public Relations staff at Rijkswaterstaat.
Goedemans	B. van Schijndel	Supervisor at Rijkswaterstaat.
Guldental	ir. Johann Pieter Adolf (J.P.A.) van Scherpenberg	Engineer at the contractor Van Hattum & Blankevoort, who worked also with the consortium of contractors who built the Zuiderzee Works known as Maatschappij tot Uitvoering van Zuiderzeewerken (MUZ), (English: Society for the implementation of the Zuiderzee works).
Jongbloed	G.P. Sturm	Representative of the water board of Walcheren.
Hermsen	Steehouwer	Assistant contractor.
Anton Hynssen (Hijnnsen)	H. Onderddijk	Chairman of the Commissie Walcheren moet droog (Dry Walcheren Committee).
Heikes	Don	Vicar in Westkapelle.
Klagemans	Gerardus Adrianus (G.A.) van Hattem	Worked for the contractor Hollandsche Aannemings Maatschappij (HAM), gaining experience with harbour caissons and later became a director of the company. In charge of the dike closure works in Westkapelle.
Lorenz	ir. Cornelis Josephus (C.J.) Witteveen	Graduated from the Technische Hogeschool Delft in 1905. Between 1914 and 1919 he was the Director of Public Works in Suriname. From 1933 until 1948, he was Director of Rijkswaterstaat in Limburg, overseeing works on the Juliana Canal and the canalization of The Meuse.
The Mathematician	Jo Johannis Dronkers	A mathematician who devised methods for calculating tides and tidal currents in sea inlets and estuaries. His 1964 paper Tidal computations in rivers and coastal waters is regarded as a standard work in the theory of tidal calculations. His work became the mathematical basis for the design of the Delta Works. In the original Dutch edition of the novel, Dronkers’ character is represented by the pseudonym ‘de Rekenmeester’. In the English translations of the novel, he is referred to as the "mathematician from The Hague, a doctor of science" whose calculations help support the decision on the order of dike closures.
Maartje & Klaartje	Martina and Wilhelmina de Vos	Evacuees from Westkapelle.
Naerebout	Ir. M.A. van Noorden	Civil engineer, who worked in the Netherlands with HAM before becoming a director of the company in South Africa.
Notekauwer	N.N. Dijkstra	After Walcheren, he became involved in the Delta Works.
Onrust	ir. G. van der Rest	Civil Engineer at Boskalis, with whom he was working in Abidjan when World War II broke out. In 1945 he was summoned by the Dutch Government in exile to the Dutch Ministry of Public Works in London.
Klaas Otterkop	Gerrit Visser	Foreman for Gebroeders Van Oord, supervising installation of fascine mattresses at Walcheren.
Rafelding	Ir. Herman Arend (H.A.) Ferguson	Employee of Rijkswaterstaat. After Walcheren, he became head of the Rijkswaterstaat research department in Vlissingen. He was subsequently appointed Director of Deltadienst, the Rijkswaterstaat department which designed and supervised the Delta Works.
Rens	Lous	Cook in the canteen at Westkapelle.
Roberts	Captain Ily	Military Captain with SHAEF (Supreme Headquarters Allied Expeditionary Force), under the command of Major Allan Beckett.
Rommel	J. Jonker	Supervisor for Rijkswaterstaat.
Roosje	B. van Groot	Trainee from the technical school in Dordrecht.
Rossiger	D.J. Blom	Rijkswaterstaat supervisor.
Scherp	A. Smit Jr.	Director of the De Schelde shipyard in Vlissingen, and military captain.
Schoonebloem	Pieter Abraham van de Velde	Worked in the tidal rivers section of Rijkswaterstaat from 1938. After Walcheren, he was involved in repair works to dikes in The Netherlands after The North Sea flood of 1953. He made major contributions to the Delta Works. In 1966, he succeeded P. Ph. Jansen as Professor of Civil Engineering at Delft University of Technology.
Smit	Dirk Pijl	Harbourmaster from Vlissingen, later employed by Boskalis.
Steengracht	ir. de Lindt	Engineer with Hollandse Aanneming Maatschappij (HAM).
(Kapitein) Tazelaar	P. Bakkeren	Tug boat captain in Rotterdam.
Teuntje	Mrs. Nel Berghuis	Wife of J.J. 'Kobus' Kalis.
(Gebroeders) van Buuren	Van Oord (Brothers)	Family who owned different companies based in Werkendam, the predecessors of the modern Van Oord company. They were mainly involved in bed protection works such as fascine mattresses.
Van der Molen	Jo Thijsse	Director of the Waterloopkundig Laboratorium, and from 1936 a professor at Delft University of Technology.
Kees van der Stoep	C.J. (Gommert) Visser	Construction foreman with Bos & Kalis.
Van Hengel	A. van Toor	Supervisor at Rijkswaterstaat.
Van Hummel	Professor Ir. Pieter Philippus (P.Ph.) Jansen	Worked after graduation for Rijkswaterstaat, mainly in river works. Became head of the Dienst Droogmaking Walcheren (the Service for the Reclamation of Walcheren, the temporary department of Rijkswaterstaat for the Walcheren closures). He was Professor of Civil Engineering at Delft University of Technology from 1946 until 1966 when he was succeeded by P.A. van de Velde. Amongst other publications, he was a contributing editor to a major book on river engineering.
Irma van Hummel	Mrs. I.L. Jansen-Mustert	Wife of professor P.Ph. Jansen.
Jolanda van Hummel	Mrs. J.I. Zeper-Jansen	Daughter of professor P.Ph. Jansen.
Irma van Hummel	Ms. I.P. Jansen	Daughter of professor P.Ph. Jansen.
Van Noorden	De Moor	Machine operator, Vlissingen harbour.
Van Regteren	C. van Westen	Banker in Middelburg, treasurer of the Commissie Walcheren moet droog (Dry Walcheren Committee).
Van Roffel	R. van der Pol	Supervisor at Rijkswaterstaat.
Van Zeurzeutel	Egbertus Dingeman (E.D.) Kalis (Bertus Kalis)	Director and part owner of the Bos & Kalis dredging company. He was working in the United Kingdom during World War II, and therefore formally dismissed from the company in 1940 to avoid problems with the occupying German forces in the Netherlands.
Wappervaan	ir. J.H. Verheij	Worked for Rijkswaterstaat from 1928, after Walcheren he became a representative of the Netherlands in the Central Commission for Navigation on the Rhine.
Waterschoot	Ir. N. Biezeveld	Worked for a contractor in the Dutch East Indies until 1939, then from 1940 with Rijkswaterstaat. Was at Walcheren between 1944 and 1946, thereafter he worked on the closure of The Brielse Maasdam, The Botlek, The Braakman and the Delta Works.
Major Young	Allan Beckett MBE	Civil Engineer with the Royal Engineers, in Walcheren with SHAEF. His memoirs provided further corroboration of the accuracy of den Doolaard's book.
Ziftelaar	J.M. de Haas	Financial administrator for Rijkswaterstaat, which he joined in 1933.

== Bibliography ==
- Het verjaagde water (1947) Netherlands: Em. Querido's Uitgeverij, Amsterdam.

--- (1958) Em. Querido's Uitgeverij, Amsterdam.
--- (2001) VSSD/Delft Academic Press, with new research and annotations by Prof. ir. K. d'Angremond and ir. G.J. Schiereck.

=== Selected editions in translation ===
- Roll back the sea (1948) United States: Simon and Schuster, New York. Translated by Barrows Mussey.
- Det beeegrade havet (English: The besieged sea) (1948) Sweden: av Buster Nyström. Translated by Sauna Fultor.
- Besiegtes Wasser Roman (English: Defeated water) (1949) Switzerland: Amerbach-Verl, Basel. Translated by Irma Silzer.
- Spoutaná voda (English: Tamed water) (1964) Czechoslovakia: Lidová demokracie, Prague.
- Akik a tengerrel csatáznak (English: Those who battle with the sea) (1981) Hungary: Európa, Budapest. Translated by Vámosi Pál.

== See also ==
- Netherlands in World War II
- Operation Infatuate
- Flood control in the Netherlands
- Zuiderzee Works
- Rijkswaterstaat
- Henry Hay (writer)
