= Sendai Bay =

Bay in Miyagi, Japan

Coordinates: 38°03′N 141°03′E

Location of Sendai Bay

Sendai Bay (Japanese: 仙台湾) is a bay from the Oshika Peninsula of Miyagi Prefecture to Cape Unoo of Fukushima Prefecture.
