= A. den Doolaard =

Pseudonym of the Dutch writer and journalist Bob Spoelstra, Jr

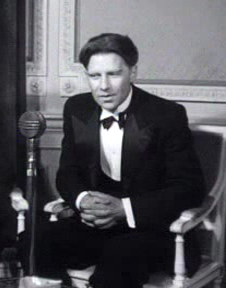
- Born: Cornelis Johannes George Spoelstra; 7 February 1901; Zwolle, Netherlands
- Died: 26 June 1994 (aged 93); Hoenderloo, Netherlands
- Occupations: Author, journalist
- Writing career
- Movement: Vitalism

A. den Doolaard (Dutch: [ˈaː dɛn ˈdoːlaːrt]; Macedonian: А. ден Долард, romanized: A. den Dolard, IPA: [ˈa dɛn ˈdɔɫart]; 7 February 1901 – 26 June 1994) is the pseudonym of the Dutch writer and journalist Cornelis Johannes George (Bob) Spoelstra Jr.

== Biography ==
Den Doolaard went to high school in The Hague. After the death of his father he worked as an accountant with the Batavian Petroleum Company (from 1920 to 1928). In 1926 he made his debut with a collection of poems. In 1928 he terminated his job and started a number of wanderings through the Balkans and France, where he had several jobs such as mason, grape picker, farm worker and longshoreman. He incorporated the experiences gained during his wanderings in novels and newspaper articles.

In 1939, the Dutch magazine Wij published as a serial his historical novella Dolken en rozenkransen (Daggers and rosaries), about the murder of the Yugoslav king Alexander in October 1934 in Marseille.

Very early, den Doolaard published warning articles against the rising fascism. A number of critical articles that he wrote for the Dutch daily newspaper Het Volk about totalitarian countries was bundled in 1937 in Swastika over Europa - een grote reportage (The Swastika over Europe - a major report). These anti-Nazi articles resulted in his expulsion from Italy, Austria and Germany. The German daily Völkische Beobachter accused Den Doolaard of "libelous reporting".

From the edition of a thousand copies, the approximately 500 unsold copies were destroyed by publisher Querido in May 1940, when the German army invaded the Netherlands and he and his wife fled to the south. They eventually succeeded in reaching England as Engelandvaarder, after spending nearly a year in France. In London he worked for the Dutch radio broadcasting station Radio Oranje and often delivered speeches to the Dutch people under German occupation, encouraging resistance.

After the Second World War, den Doolaard returned to the Netherlands. From 1954 he lived in Hoenderloo.

== Recognition in Macedonia ==
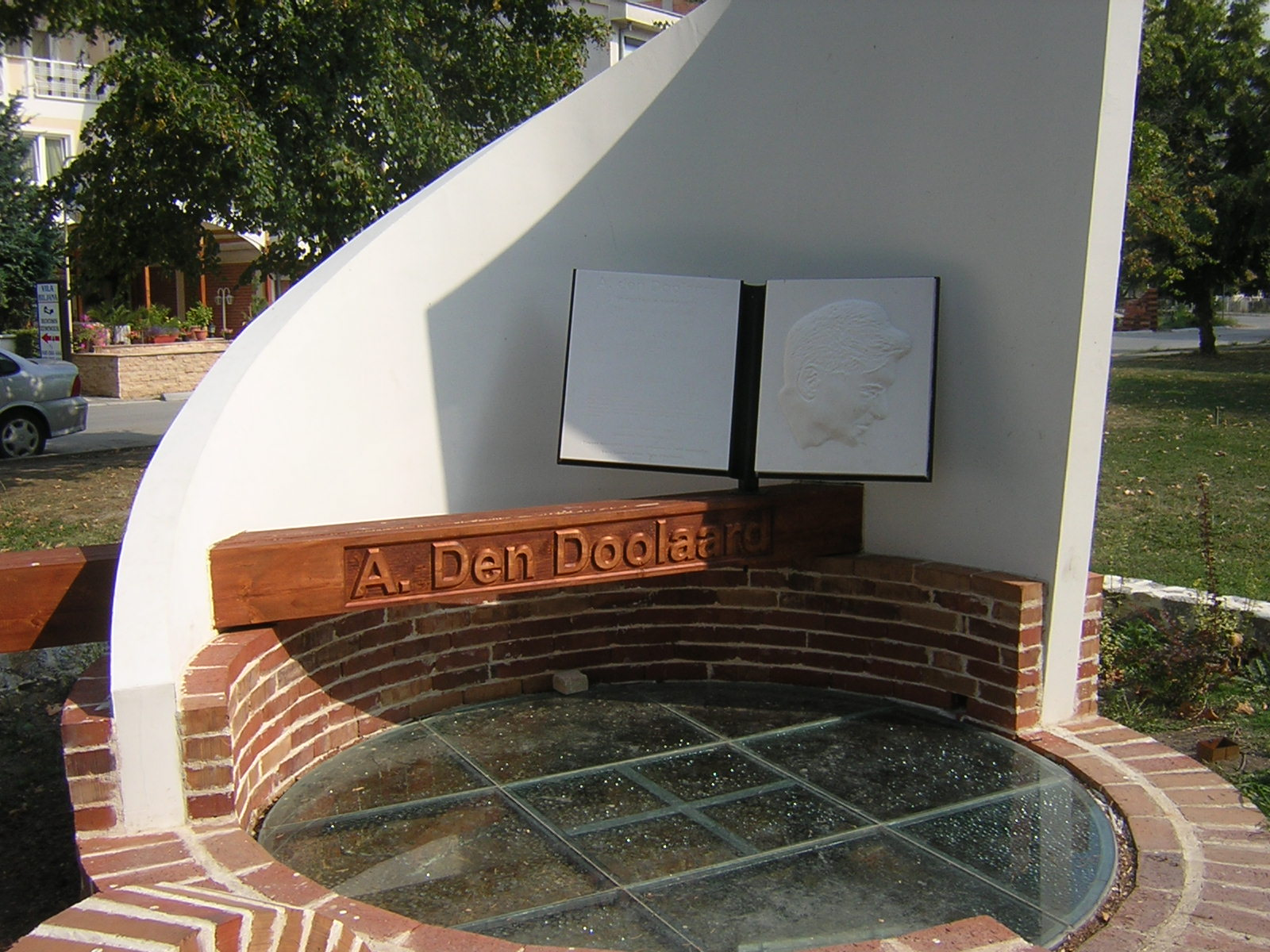
The Monument for A. den Doolaard in Ohrid

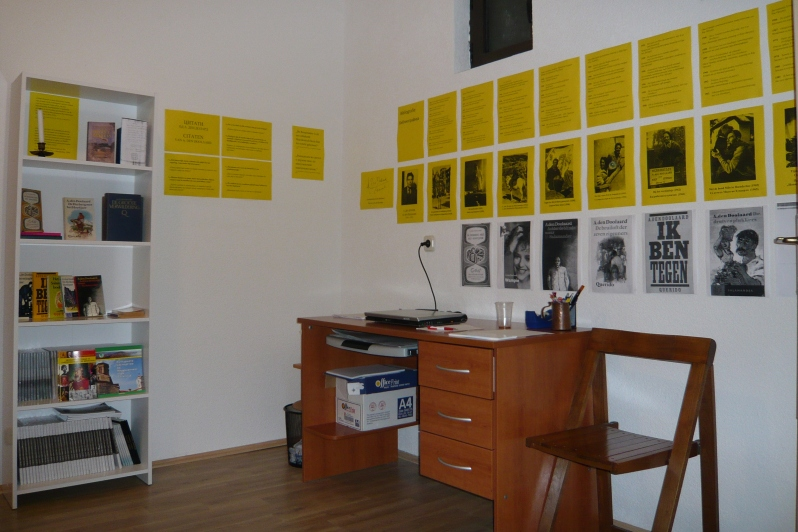
The Memorial Room for A. den Doolaard in Ohrid

With the publication of his novels "Oriënt-Express" in 1934 and "The Wedding of the Seven Gypsies" in 1939, den Doolaard generated interest in Macedonia. For decades, the Dutch have been among the most numerous tourists in Macedonia, and this has led to cooperation between Macedonia and the Netherlands in different fields. Macedonians express respect for the Dutch writer.

In 2006, the Macedonian town of Ohrid erected a monument in honor of A. den Doolaard and renamed a square to commemorate him. The monument was designed by the Macedonian architect, Vladimir Toić, based on an idea conceived by Peter John Bosse, president and founder of the Dutch Chamber of Commerce in Macedonia. In 2011, a memorial room opened in Ohrid with an exhibition of books and documents explaining the life and work of the author. The exhibition was organized by the Macedonian writer and photographer Mišo Juzmeski, who also has published articles on the meaning of den Doolaard for the development of the Dutch-Macedonian relations.

== Prizes ==
- 1934 – Meiprijs for the novel "De herberg met het hoefijzer" (The Inn with the Horseshoe)
- 1980 – Edo Bergsma – ANWB Award for lifetime achievement

== Bibliography ==
- 1926 – De verliefde betonwerker (poems), publ. A.A.M. Stols, Maastricht
- 1928 – De wilde vaart (poems), publ. De Gemeenschap, Utrecht
- 1928 - Vier balladen, publ. A.A.M.Stols, Maastricht
- 1928 - Ballade du jeune marin, publ. De Gemeenschap, Utrecht
- 1929 – De laatste ronde - roman van liefde en andere noodlottigheden (novel), publ. Strengholt, Amsterdam
- 1930 – Van camera, ski en propeller. Film-avonturen en ski-onderricht in het Mont-Blancgebied, publ. De Spieghel, Amsterdam
- 1931 – De druivenplukkers (novel), publ. Querido, Amsterdam
- 1932 – De witte stilte (novel), uitg. Strengholt, Amsterdam
- 1932 – De wilden van Europa, publ. Querido, Amsterdam
- 1932 – Quatre mois chez les comitadjis, meurtriers patentés, publ. Bossuet, Paris
- 1933 – De herberg met het hoefijzer (novel) (The Inn with the Horseshoe)
- 1934 – Oriënt-Express (novel)
- 1934 – Hooge hoeden en pantserplaten (manifesto)
- 1935 – Oostenrijk (Austria)
- 1935 – Van vrijheid en dood (Of freedom and death)
- 1936 – Wapen tegen wapen. Over het werk van socialistische journalisten in de fascistische landen (brochure) (met L.J. van Looi)
- 1936 – De grote verwildering (historical novel on the first climb of Mont Blanc)
- 1938 – Het hakenkruis over Europa (Swastika over Europe) - publ. Querido
- 1938 – Wampie. De roman van een zorgeloze zomer (novel)
- 1938 – Door het land der lemen torens
- 1939 – De bruiloft der zeven zigeuners (novel)
- 1939 – Dolken en rozenkransen (novel, published as feuilleton)
- 1944 – Oranjehotel (sonnet)
- 1944 – De partizanen en andere gedichten (poems)
- 1944 – De vier ruiters (poems)
- 1944 – Vooravond kerstmis 1944 (poem)
- 1945 – Nederland herdenkt 1940–1945: Drama der bezetting (The Netherlands remember 1940–1945: Epic of the occupation)
- 1946 – Dit is Walcheren (This is the island of Walcheren)
- 1946 – Europa tegen de Moffen (some radio speeches)
- 1946 – Walcheren komt boven water (Walcheren emerges again from the water)
- 1946 – Het spel der bevrijding (The game of the liberation)
- 1947 – Het verjaagde water (novel)
- 1949 – De gouden ploeg (play)
- 1953 – Kleine mensen in de grote wereld (novel)
- 1955 – De toekomst in uw handen (manifesto)
- 1956 – Joegoslavië, kaleidoscopisch reisland (Travels in Yugoslavia)
- 1956 – Het land achter Gods rug (novel)
- 1956 – Dit is Joegoslavië (This is Yugoslavia)
- 1958 – Dit is Griekenland; het vasteland (This is Greece; the mainland)
- 1958 – Dit is Venetië (This is Venice)
- 1958 – Het leven van een landloper (autobiography)
- 1959 – Dit is Griekenland; het vasteland
- 1960 – Grieken zijn geen goden (Greeks are no gods)
- 1962 – Prinsen, priesters en paria's (Princes, priests and pariahs)
- 1963 – Vakantieland Joegoslavië
- 1966 – De goden gaan naar huis (novel)
- 1967 – Ontsporingen (narratives)
- 1967 – Achter de blinde muur (narratives)
- 1971 – Ogen op de rug; Terugkijkend naar boeken en tijdgenoten (autobiography)
- 1976 – Samen is twee keer alleen (novel)
- 1980 – Londen en de zaak Van 't Sant (pamphlet)
- 1983 – Ik ben tegen (essays)

=== Translations ===
- 1948 - Roll back the sea
- 1949 - Besieftes Wasser
- 1954 - Nazad, more! (Serbo-Croatian)
- 1955 - Vaincre la mer (in French)
- 1981 - Akik a tengerrel csatáznak (in Hungarian)

=== Published posthumously ===
- 2004 - Het hakenkruis over Europa (Swastika over Europe) - re-edition with an added epilogue, publ. Uitgeverij De Prom
- 2017 - Het verjaagde water - re-edition, edited by K. d' Angremond and G.J. Schiereck, publ. VSSD
