= Jo Thijsse =

Dutch civil engineer

Johannes Theodoor Thijsse
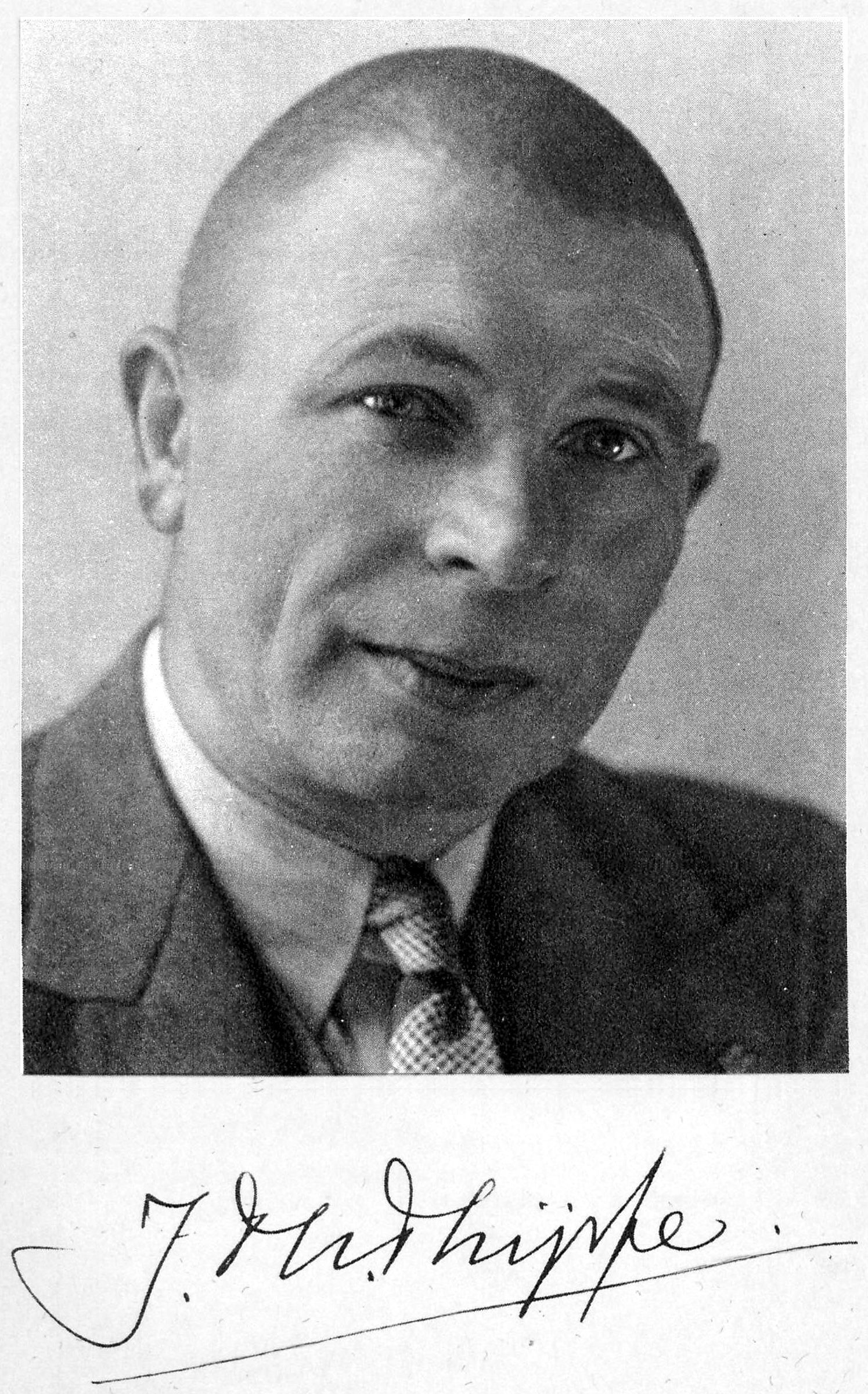
- Thijsse, pictured in 1939
- Born: 11 April 1893; Amsterdam, The Netherlands
- Died: 30 April 1984 (aged 91); Leiderdorp, The Netherlands
- Citizenship: Netherlands
- Education: Delft University of Technology
- Known for: Major contributor to the Zuiderzee Works and Delta Works; Establishment of the IHE Delft Institute for Water Education; De Eieren van Thijsse (Thijsse's eggs)
- Scientific career
- Fields: Civil Engineering; Hydraulic Engineering
- Workplaces: Rijkswaterstaat; Waterloopkundig Laboratorium; Staatscommissie Zuiderzee

Johannes Theodoor Thijsse (11 April 1893 – 30 April 1984) was a Dutch hydraulic engineer who made significant contributions to hydraulic engineering both in The Netherlands and internationally. In addition to having a major involvement in the design and planning of both the Zuiderzee Works and the Delta Works, he published widely and played a key role in the establishment of the IHE Delft Institute for Water Education.

He served as the first director of the Waterloopkundig Laboratorium (Delft Hydraulic Research Laboratory), a position he held from 1927 until 1960. Under Thijsse's leadership, the laboratory became a leading international centre for hydraulic, river and coastal engineering research. The laboratory came to be officially known by its English name, Delft Hydraulics, and continues today as a major research institute and the cornerstone of the international nonprofit knowledge institute for water and the subsurface, Deltares.

== Life and career ==
Thijsse was born in Amsterdam on 11 April 1893. His father was the notable botanist and educator Dr. Jacobus Pieter Thijsse. After completing his higher education at HBS in Bloemendaal, he attended Delft University of Technology to study civil engineering, where he graduated with a distinction in 1917.

=== The Zuiderzee Works and State Commission ===
In 1918, Thijsse joined the Staatscommissie Zuiderzee (Zuiderzee State Commission), a Dutch State Commission set up to investigate high water levels and make recommendations on the closure of the Zuiderzee, chaired by physicist Hendrik Lorentz. This marked the beginning of his professional journey, a year ahead of Johan van Veen, another notable figure later regarded as the father of the Delta Plan, and a man with whom Thijsse would experience several professional disputes.

Lorentz's fundamental and theoretical approach based on the laws of hydrodynamics greatly impacted Thijsse, influencing much of his subsequent work. The commission's main mandate was to investigate how the closure of the Zuiderzee would impact storm-induced water levels. The findings of the commission's report in 1926 marked the first significant milestone in Thijsse's career, leading to his appointment as an Officer in the Order of Orange-Nassau in 1927.

Thijsse's involvement with the Zuiderzee Works extended throughout his life. Initially, he was appointed an engineer at the Zuiderzee Works Service in 1920. In 1948, he was promoted to Chief Engineer-Director, a position he held until 1958. He continued to serve as an advisor until 1963. His extensive knowledge on the Zuiderzee Works was encapsulated in the book Een halve eeuw Zuiderzeewerken (Half a century of the Zuiderzee Works), which he published in 1972 at the age of 80.

=== Delft Hydraulic Research Laboratory ===
Thijsse's role on the Zuiderzee State Commission introduced him to hydrodynamic model research, an innovative approach to understanding the dynamics of water. In 1927, both Rijkswaterstaat and Delft University of Technology began incorporating this research methodology, prompting the establishment of the Waterloopkundig Laboratorium Delft (Delft Hydraulic Research Laboratory), with Thijsse appointed as its head.

The impetus for the formation of the laboratory began in the 1920s, and lay in the design of the sluices for the Afsluitdijk, a significant project requiring extensive research and experimentation. The task was initially assigned to Professor Rehbock at the Flussbaulaboratorium (river construction laboratory) at the Technical University of Karlsruhe, a major institute in the field of hydraulic engineering research at the time. The results of this investigation were documented in a report which was published in 1931.

This report was subject to review by Thijsse, who advised the Dutch authorities on the need for additional research of this type, not just for the Zuiderzee Works, but also for other projects across the Netherlands. This recommendation precipitated the decision to establish a laboratory similar to that in Karlsruhe, to serve the Netherlands. Thijsse spearheaded the initial research at the newly formed laboratory and documented the findings in a follow-up report to Rehbock's original study.

To facilitate third-party contract research, such as work for Rijkswaterstaat and international schemes, it was decided that the laboratory would operate independently from the Delft University of Technology, and be established as a financially autonomous foundation, with its board appointed from university staff, major consultants, and representatives from Rijkswaterstaat.

Thijsse served as director of the laboratory until 1960. Through this work, he made significant contributions to the study of a variety of hydraulic engineering issues, including tides, storm surges, waves, sediment transport, as well as river and coastal morphodynamics. In 1973, the laboratory moved from its location in the centre of Delft to a new location at the most southerly end of the Delft Technological University campus, becoming known locally as the Thijsse erf (Thijsse yard). The laboratory continues to operate today as part of Deltares.

=== Teaching, involvement in the Delta Works, and international recognition ===
In 1938, Thijsse received an additional appointment as a professor in theoretical and experimental hydraulics at Delft, succeeding Gerard Henri de Vries Broekman.

As with other branches of science, the ideal in hydraulics is to describe phenomena with the help of as few general formulae, rules or laws as possible, each of which is as general as possible. Preferably, these rules should be based on theoretical considerations; they are therefore suitable for predicting unobserved phenomena. When deriving laws, one must rely on perceptions. Experiment therefore precedes theory, and not for nothing was the motto of Kamerlingh Onnes "Through measurement to knowledge".

— Prof. ir. Jo Thijsse, Public address on the occasion of his professorship, Theorie en experiment in de hydraulica (Theory and experiment in hydraulics) (1938)

Thijsse played a key role in the hydraulic engineering works in the delta area in south-west Netherlands, including the Delta Works and remedial works following the inundation of Walcheren. After his involvement at Walcheren, Thijsse was portrayed as the character van der Molen in the non-fiction novel Het verjaagde water by A. den Doolaard. Immediately after the disastrous effects of the North Sea Flood of 1953, Thijsse was immediately recalled by the Dutch Government from a lecture tour of the United States to work with the Deltacommissie overseeing the Delta Works.

He was also actively involved in research organisation, co-founding the IAHR (International Association for Hydraulic Research) in 1935 and serving as its secretary-treasurer until 1959. He also served as the president of IAHS (International Association of Hydrological Sciences) from 1951 to 1958.

== Later life, legacy and death ==
In 1958, he received the William Bowie Medal of the American Geophysical Union. Thijsse was only the second foreigner to receive the honour since its inception in 1933. In 1963, he was awarded an honorary doctorate from the University of Liège. When the Royal Netherlands Institute for Sea Research was established in 1960, Thijsse became its first chairman, serving until 1967.

An important facet of Thijsse's career was his dedication to education, both nationally and internationally. In 1936, he was assigned a teaching role at Delft in theoretical and practical hydraulics. He was appointed an Extraordinary Professor in 1938 and ascended to a full professorship in 1946. In 1963, he was presented with a Liber Amicorum.

Thijsse was a key figure behind the establishment of the IHE Delft Institute for Water Education, where he developed postgraduate courses designed to share Dutch expertise and experience with international students, particularly those from developing countries. The initiative was hugely successful. From the inception of these courses until 1968, Thijsse was a key lecturer. From 1961 to 1963, he also served as chairman of the Administrative Council of the Dutch educational organisation, Nuffic. He died in 1984 at the age of 91.

== Gallery ==
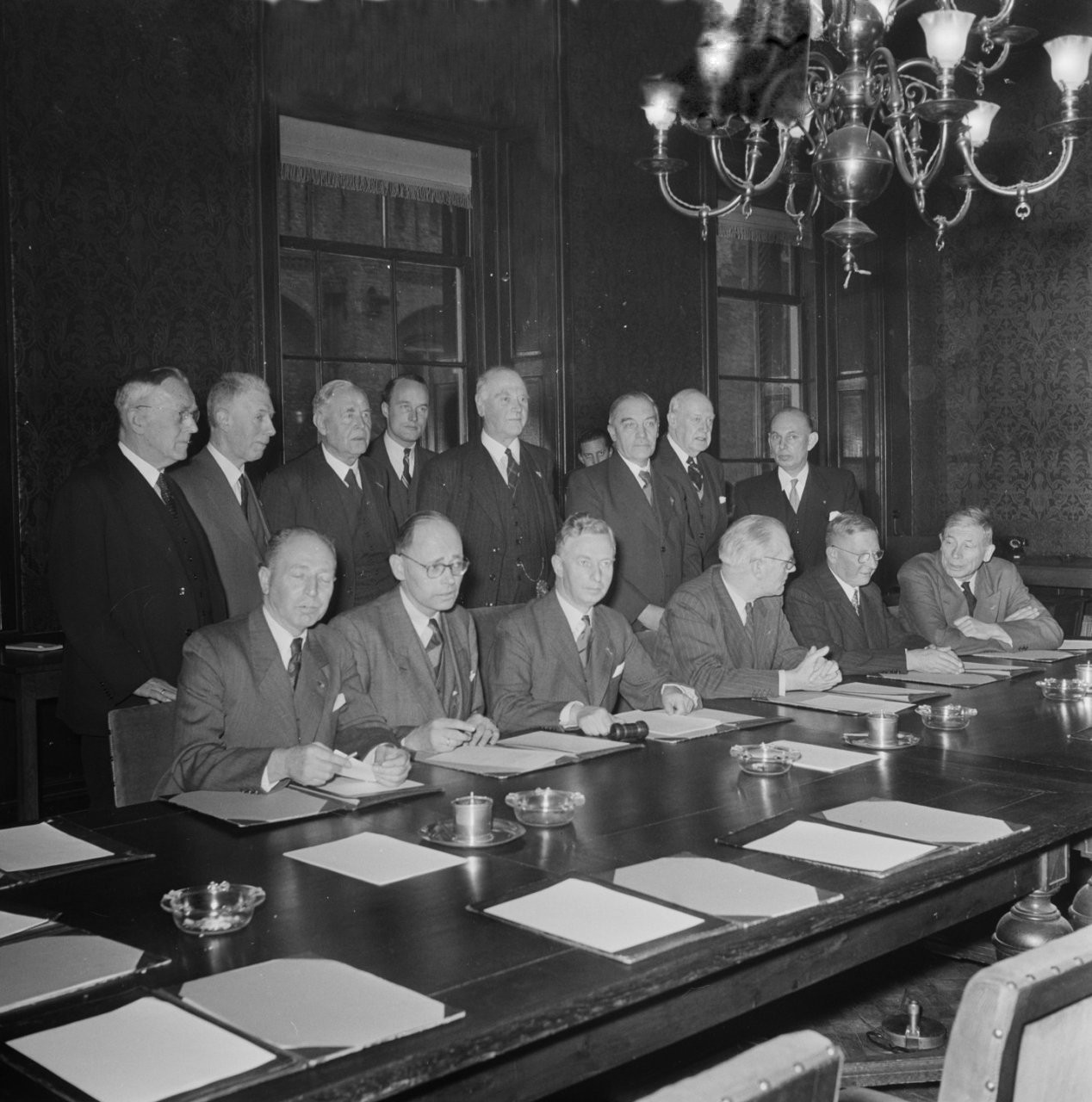
Installation of the Delta Committee, 21 February 1953

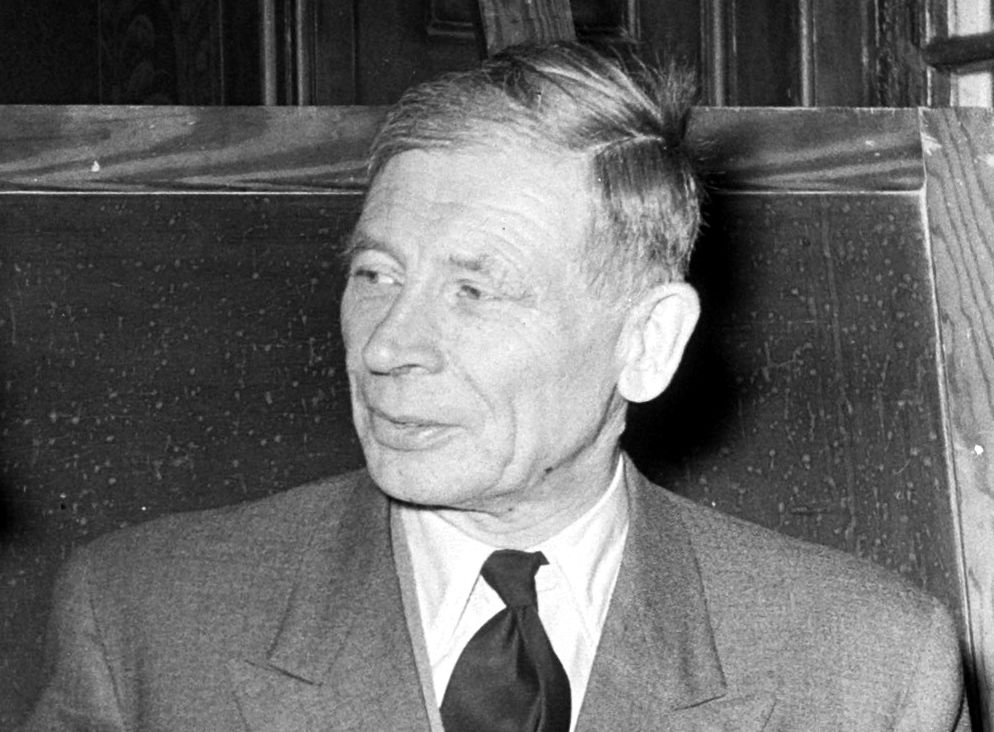
Thijsse in 1953

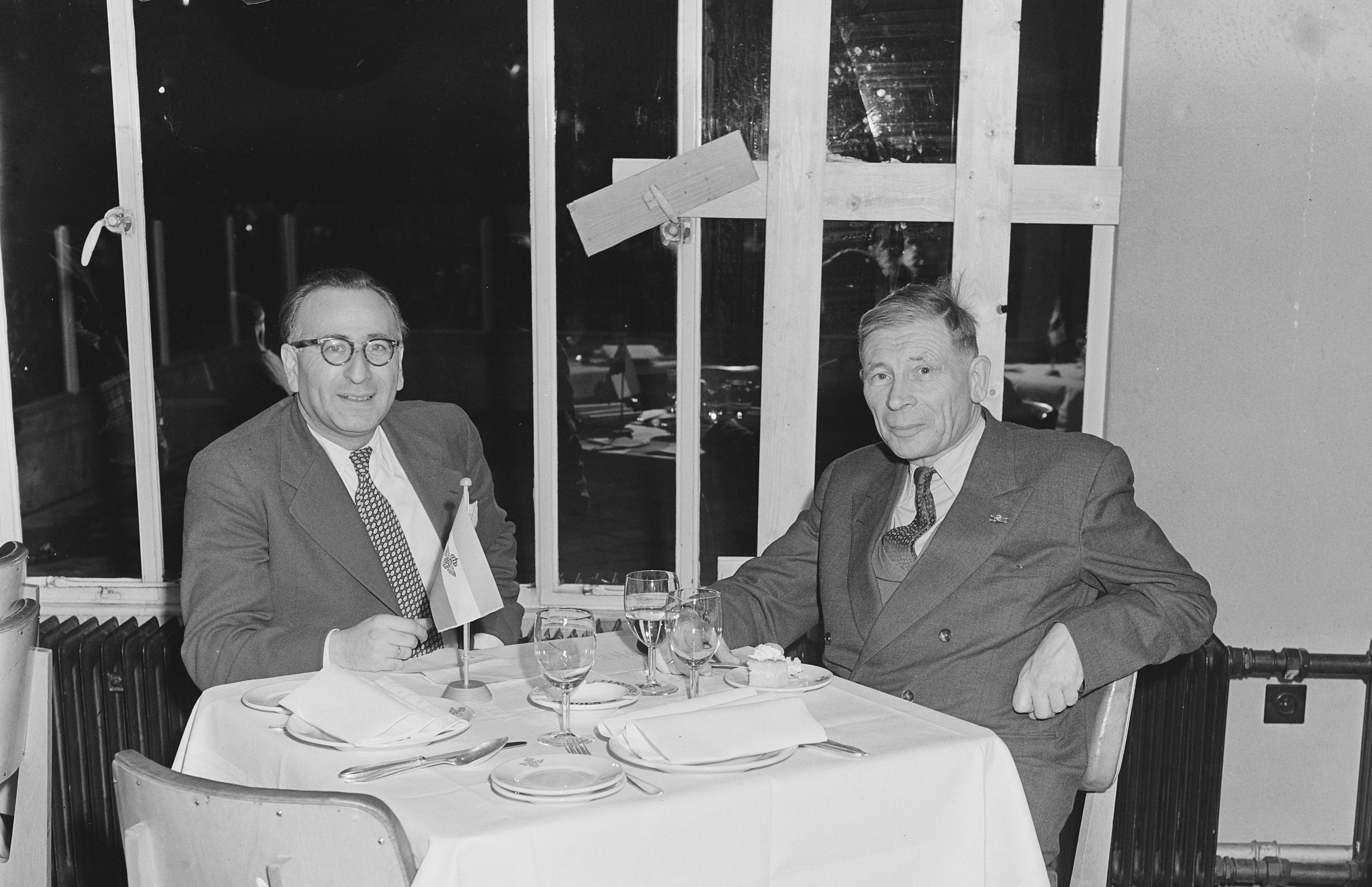
Thijsse departs for India, 1954

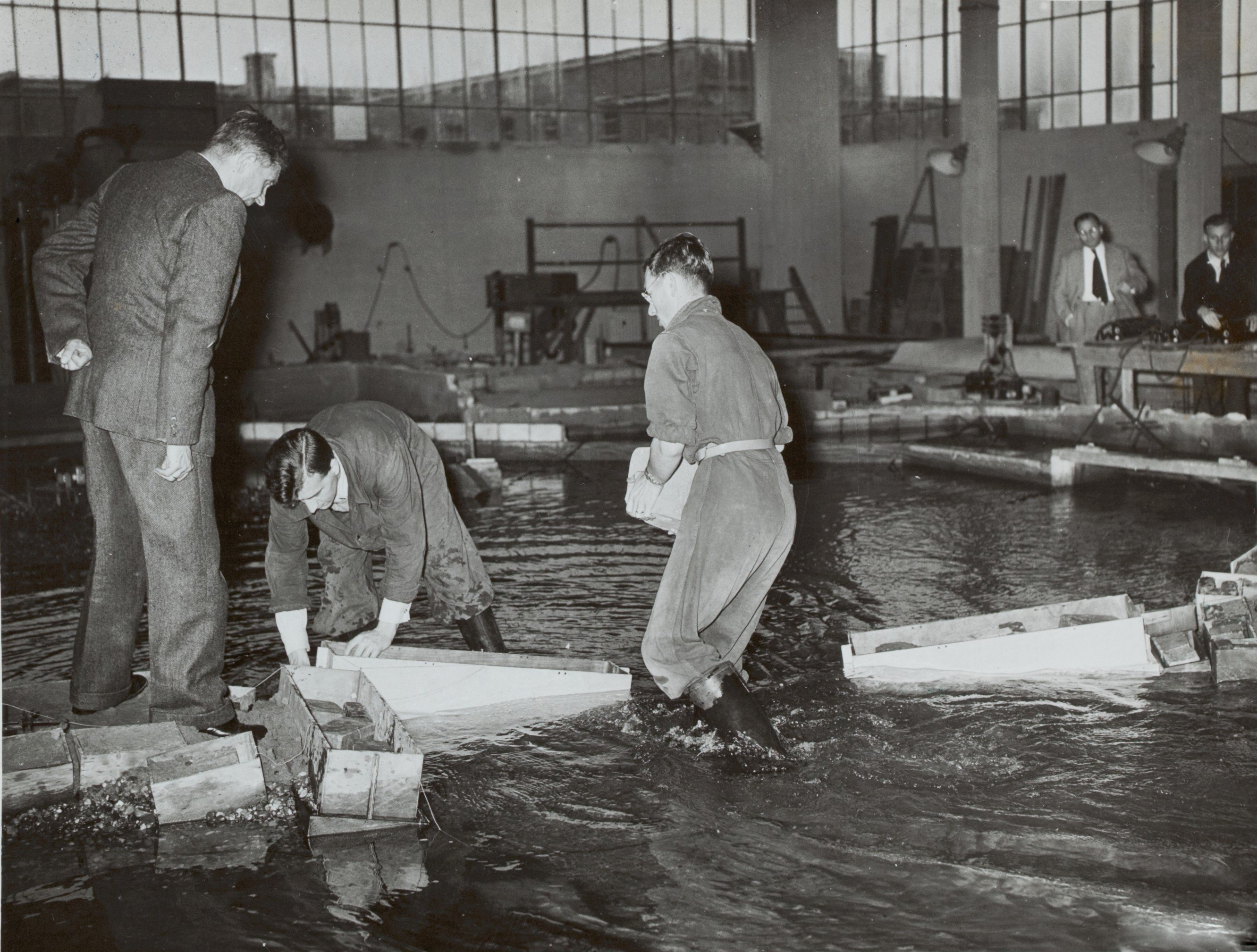
Thijsse in the Hydraulics Research Laboratory in Delft

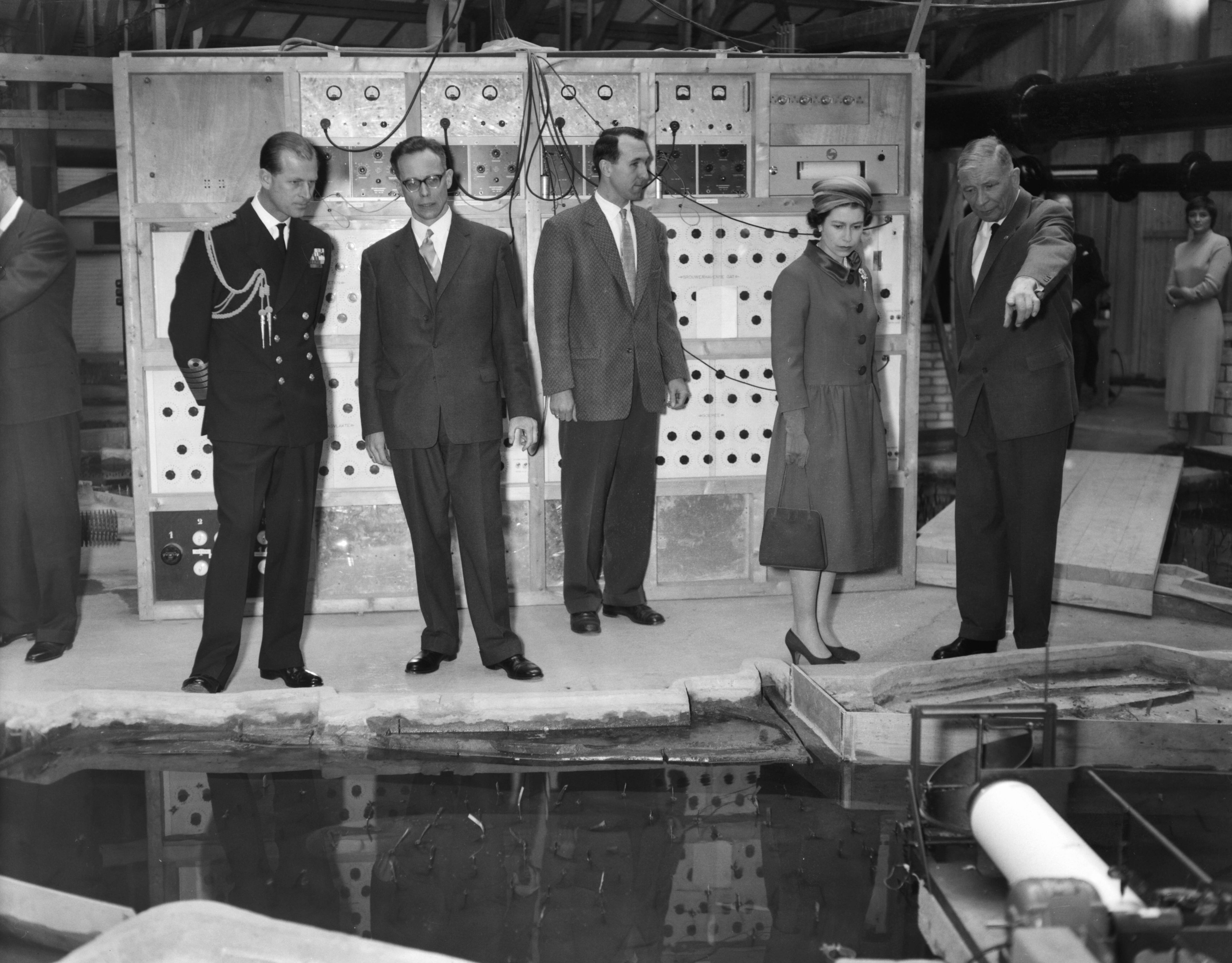
Thijsse (on the right) during the visit of Elizabeth II and Prince Philip, Duke of Edinburgh to the Hydraulics Research Laboratory in Delft, 1958

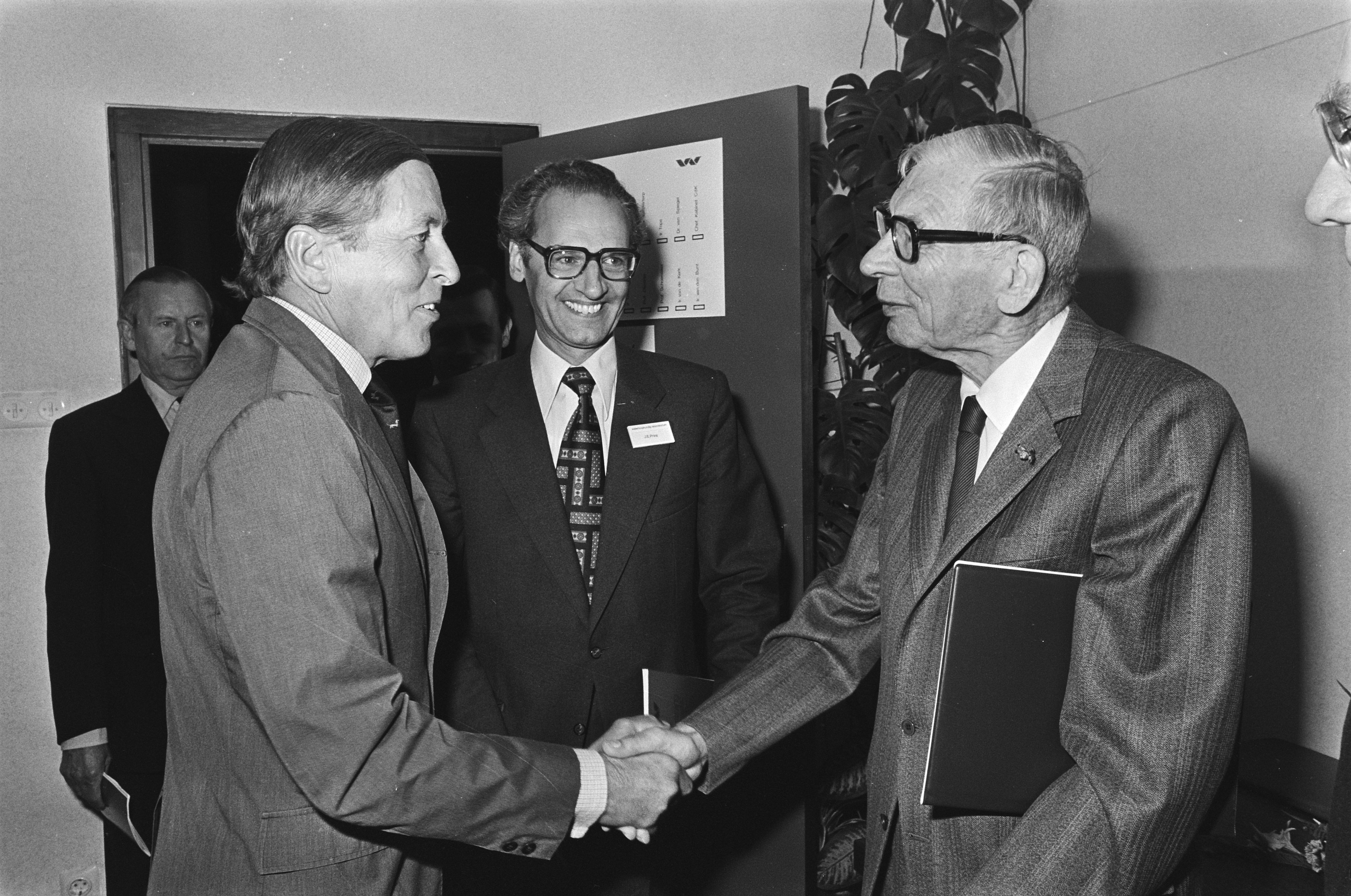
Prince Claus of the Netherlands greets Thijsse at the opening of a colloquium at the Hydraulics Research Laboratory, Delft, 1977

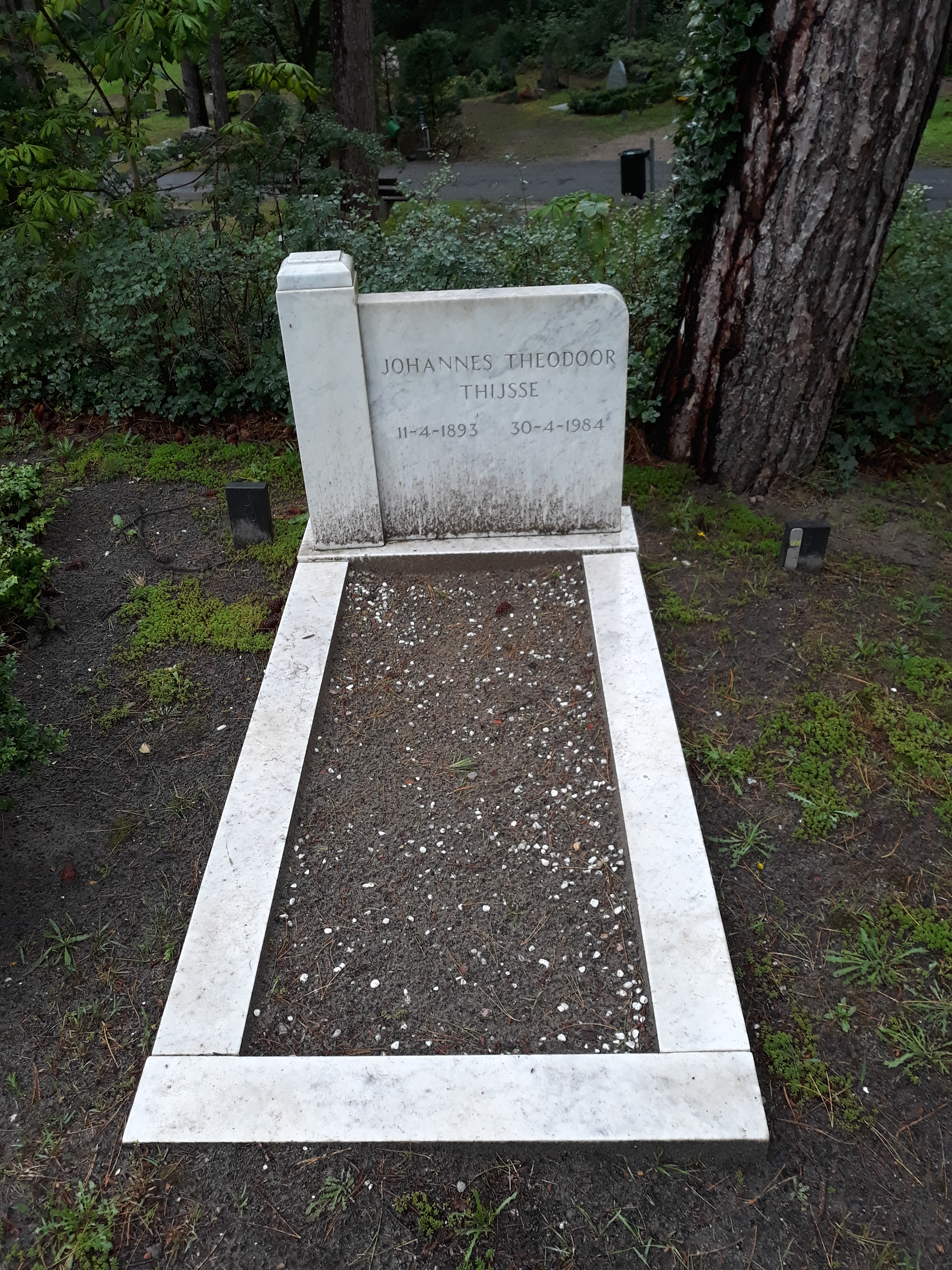
Thijsse's grave in Bloemendaal

== See also ==
- Flood control in the Netherlands
- Delta Works
- Zuiderzee Works
- Rijkswaterstaat
- Johan van Veen
- Hendrik Lorentz
