= Waterloopkundig Laboratorium =

Dutch hydraulic research laboratory

Hydraulic Laboratory
- Waterloopkundig Laboratorium
- WL Delft Hydraulics
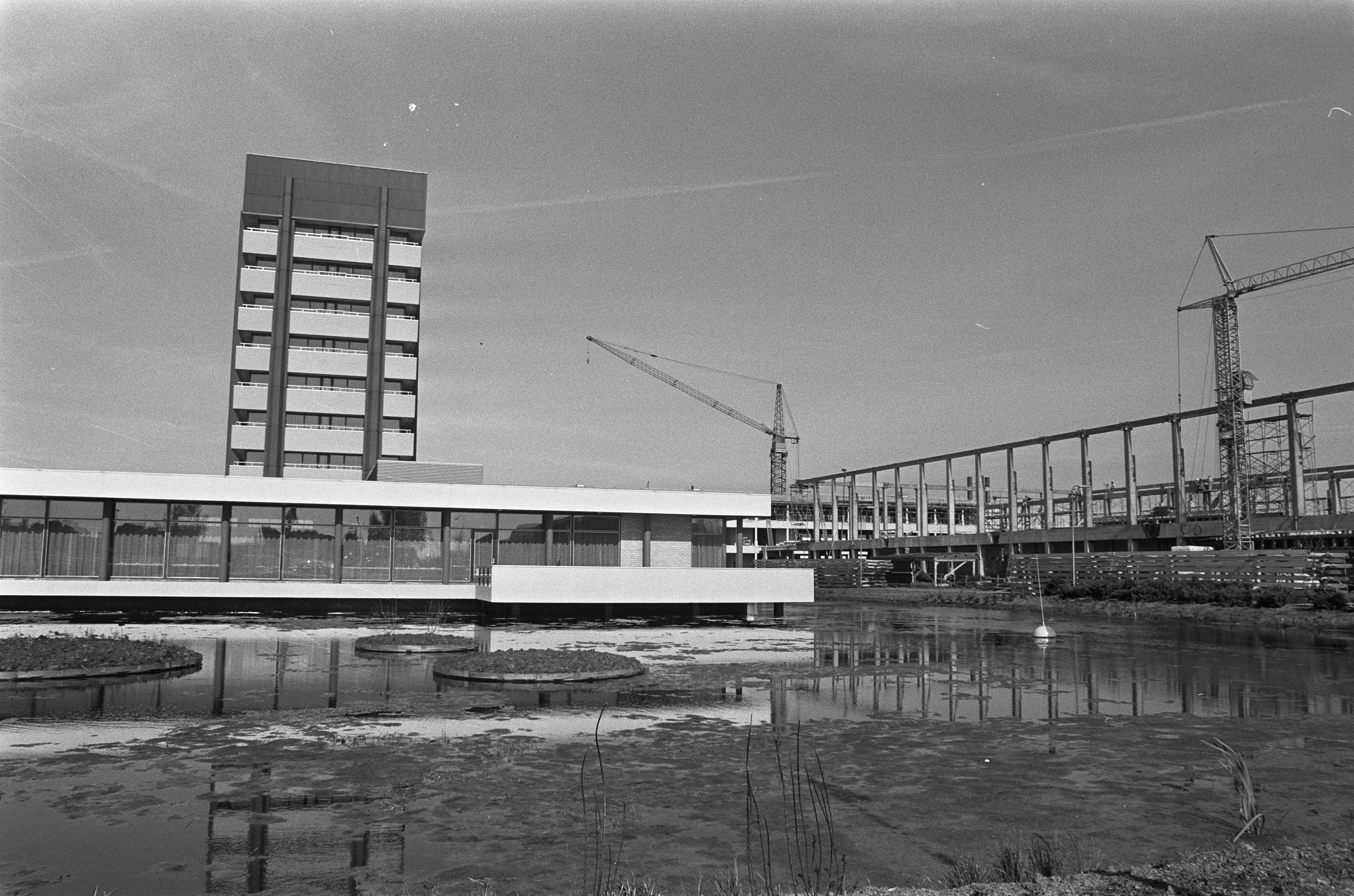
- Established: 1927
- Laboratory type: Hydraulic Engineering Research Laboratory
- Location: Delft, The Netherlands

The Waterloopkundig Laboratorium (Hydraulic Research Laboratory) was an independent Dutch scientific institute specialising in hydraulics and hydraulic engineering. The laboratory was established in Delft from 1927, moving to a new location in the city in 1973. The institute later became known as WL | Delft Hydraulics. In 2008, the laboratory was incorporated into the international nonprofit Deltares institute.

== Purpose ==
The Hydraulic Laboratory was classified by the Dutch Government as a major technological institute and was tasked with acquiring, generating, and disseminating knowledge on hydraulics and hydraulic engineering.

The laboratory conducted research into the causes of changes in the course of rivers, estuaries, and coasts, and the possible influences on them due to hydraulic engineering activities, along with a range of studies on topics such as dredging, wave action and coastal morphodynamics. The laboratory played a significant advisory role in the conception, design, and implementation of the Zuiderzee Works and the Delta Works, along with several international projects.

== History ==
The laboratory was established in 1927 by Rijkswaterstaat, under the directorship of Professor ir. J.Th. Thijsse (1893–1984). It was initially located in the basement of the Civil Engineering Department building at Delft University of Technology.

Thijsse's role on the Zuiderzee State Commission had introduced him to hydrodynamic model research, an innovative approach to understanding the dynamics of water. In 1927, both Rijkswaterstaat and Delft University of Technology began incorporating this research methodology, prompting the establishment of the laboratory.

The impetus for the formation of the laboratory began in the 1920s, and lay in the design of the sluices for the Afsluitdijk, a significant project requiring extensive research and experimentation. The task was initially assigned to Professor Theodor Rehbock at the Flussbaulaboratorium (river construction laboratory) at the Technical University of Karlsruhe, a major institute in the field of hydraulic engineering research at the time. The results of this investigation were documented in a report which was published in 1931.

This report was subject to review by Thijsse, who advised the Dutch authorities on the need for additional research of this type, not just for the Zuiderzee Works, but also for other projects across the Netherlands. This recommendation precipitated the decision to establish a laboratory similar to that in Karlsruhe, to serve the Netherlands. Thijsse spearheaded the initial research at the newly formed laboratory and documented the findings in a follow-up report to Rehbock's original study.

To facilitate third-party contract research, such as work for Rijkswaterstaat and international schemes, it was decided that the laboratory would operate independently from the Delft University of Technology, and be established as a financially autonomous foundation, with its board appointed from university staff, major consultants, and representatives from Rijkswaterstaat.

Experiments into the behaviour of irregular waves had been undertaken in the Netherlands since 1920, with initial experiments on irregular wave behaviour in wind tunnels. This pioneering research, including investigations into wave run-up, led to the construction of a specialised wind wave flume at the laboratory in 1933. Unprecedented at the time of construction, the flume boasted dimensions of 25 metres in length, 4 metres in width, and a maximum water depth of 0.45 metres.

Subsequently, in order to better satisfy the necessary conditions for wave height and period, the flume was extended to 50 metres in length, and fitted with a monochromatic wave generator. These enhancements enabled a wider variety of research projects, including studies on wave overtopping, the stability of rubble-mound breakwaters, wave impact forces, and the stability of floating structures. By the time of World War II, research had extended into model investigations of wave generation, with outcomes corroborating prototype data collected by Harald Sverdrup and Walter Munk.

In 1969, new wave flumes with typical widths of 8 metres were installed in the laboratory in order to permit modelling and testing of breakwaters and dikes whilst simulating arbitrary angles of wave attack. The previously available flume widths of 4 metres had proved too small for this purpose, and the new flumes therefore provided the laboratory with the ability to model and test the performance of significant coastal and river engineering structures.

In 1973, the laboratory moved from its location in the centre of Delft to a new location at the most southern end of the Delft Technological University campus, becoming known locally as the Thijsse-erf (Thijsse yard).

Throughout its history, the laboratory undertook national and international research on numerous civil and hydraulic engineering subjects including dredging technology, density issues, pumps, and detailed structural studies on locks and weirs. International projects included the Belgian Port of Zeebrugge (1933–36), the cut-off of the Abidjan lagoon (1933–46), and flood prevention works in Nottingham (1946–51).

== The Waterloopkundig Laboratorium "de Voorst" ==
From 1951 to 1996, a second location known as the Waterloopkundig Laboratorium de Voorst (WLV) (Hydraulic Laboratory "de Voorst") was located in Noordoostpolder, between Marknesse, Kraggenburg, and Vollenhove. The establishment of a second laboratory at de Voorst was prompted by the lack of space in Delft for large outdoor models. Utilising land on the outskirts of Delft was not feasible due to the damp peat soil, which made it difficult to construct large models without soil settlement. In an environment where water levels are measured on a millimetric scale, even minute settlements were unacceptable.

Additional benefits of the de Voorst location included its location within a low-lying polder, eliminating the need for an additional pumping system, and its availability due to the heavy boulder clay composition of the soil making it unsuitable for farming. Since the land was government-owned, no financial acquisition was required. From 1951, the Waterloopkundig Laboratorium therefore operated two facilities: an indoor modelling laboratory in Delft, and an outdoor model facility in De Voorst. In the 1970s, indoor laboratory facilities were added to the de Voorst location.

A significant advantage of the de Voorst location was the ability to construct large-scale models of estuaries and ports, enabling model tests to predict the influence of hydraulic works on the watercourses, making use of the large differences in water levels from the surrounding surface water. These models were pivotal during the planning and construction phase of the Delta Works in Zeeland, and also allowed research works to be undertaken for international projects such as the reconstruction of the Port of Lagos.

Other international projects where research was carried out at the laboratory to inform the design and construction included the construction of the Eider Barrage, and works at the mouth of the Volta River in Ghana.

The scale of the physical models in the laboratory were often substantial, with many being large enough to permit model ships which necessitated pilotage by helmsmen, an example being the model created for Jo Thijsse's design for the junction of the Amsterdam–Rhine Canal and the Lek, a large structure which came to be known as De Eieren van Thijsse (Thijsse's eggs).

From the 1980s, computer-assisted mathematical modelling began to be useful in mapping potential water flows, reducing the need for very large-scale physical water models. Consequently, the decision was made in 1995 to concentrate activities at the Delft location and close the de Voorst facilities. The site was purchased by Natuurmonumenten and renamed the Waterloopbos, where visitors can view the models and associated infrastructure via a walking route through the woods.

== Consolidation into Deltares ==
By 2008, the Delft laboratory had become known by the English name WL | Delft Hydraulics, and in an effort to consolidate knowledge with similar institutes, it was merged with other research institutes and sections of Rijkswaterstaat to form the Deltares Institute. The laboratory continues to operate today as part of Deltares.

== Directors and notable figures ==
The following people were directors of the laboratory from its foundation in 1927 until it merged with Deltares in 2008.

Directors of the Waterloopkundig Laboratorium, 1927 - 2008
Year from	Year to	Name
1927	1960	ir. Johannes Theodoor Thijsse
1960	1971	ir. Harold Jan Schoemaker
1971	1986	ir. Jacob Egbert Prins
1986	1996	ir. Henk Jan Overbeek
1997	2007	ir. Jan Groen
2008	2008	Merged with Deltares

The following personnel served as Heads of the de Voorst facility.

Heads of the Waterloopkundig Laboratorium "de Voorst"
Year from	Year to	Name
1960	1968	ir. Abe Hoekstra
1968	1990	ir. Joannes Jacobus Vinjé

Significant engineering figures who undertook research or served in senior positions with the Waterloopkundig Laboratorium included Eco Bijker (various roles including head of department, head of the de Voorst Laboratory, and deputy director), Pieter Abraham van de Velde, Frank Spaargaren (interim general director, 1995–1997), Krystian Pilarczyk (research engineer, 1966–1968), Johan Ringers (vice chairman), and PJ Wemelsfelder, who undertook research at the facility and served as head of the Hydrometric Department.

== The Waterbouwkundig Laboratorium (Belgium) ==
A similar institution known as the Waterbouwkundig Laboratorium (Hydraulic Engineering Research Laboratory) is located in Borgerhout, Belgium. It was established in 1933.

== Gallery ==
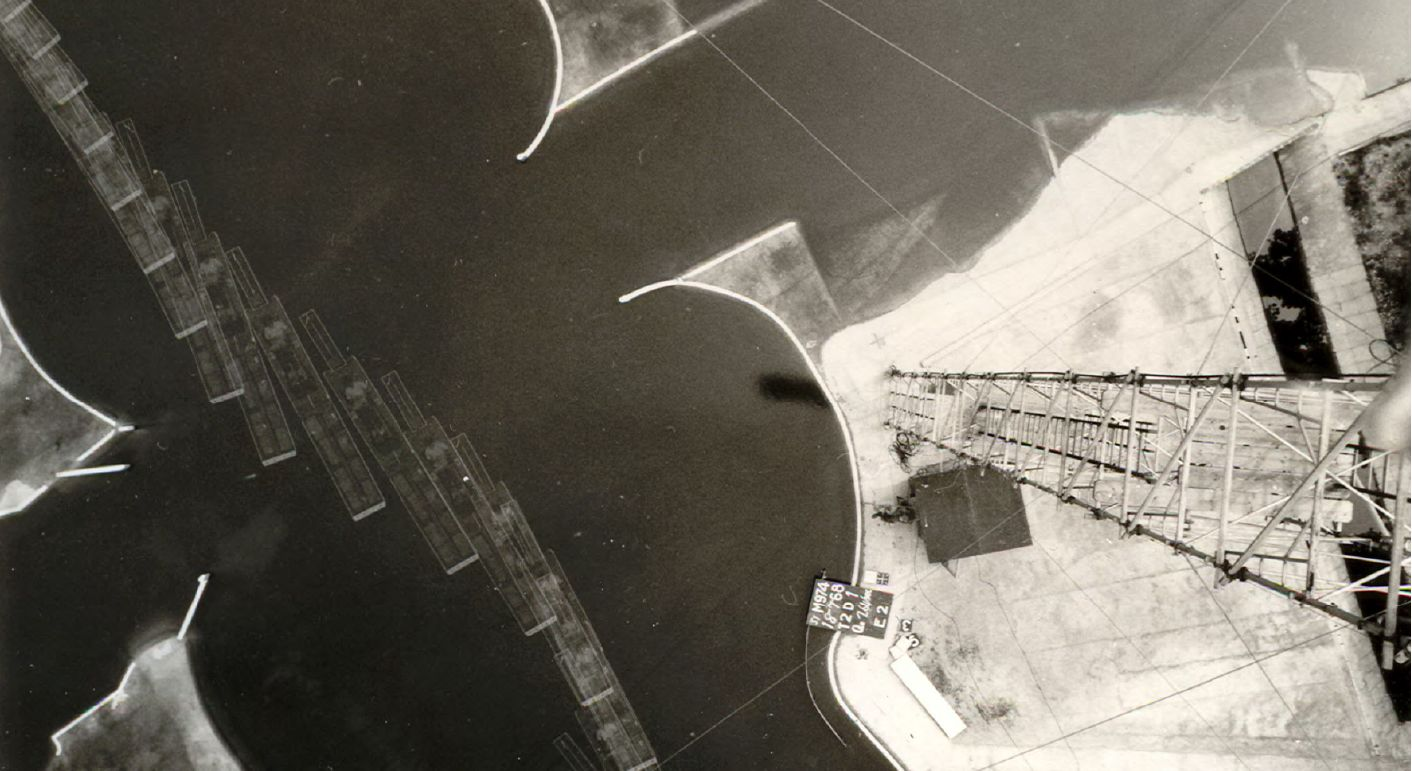
Model at the Waterloopkundig Laboratorium de Voorst used in the design of a section of the Amsterdam-Rhine Canal.

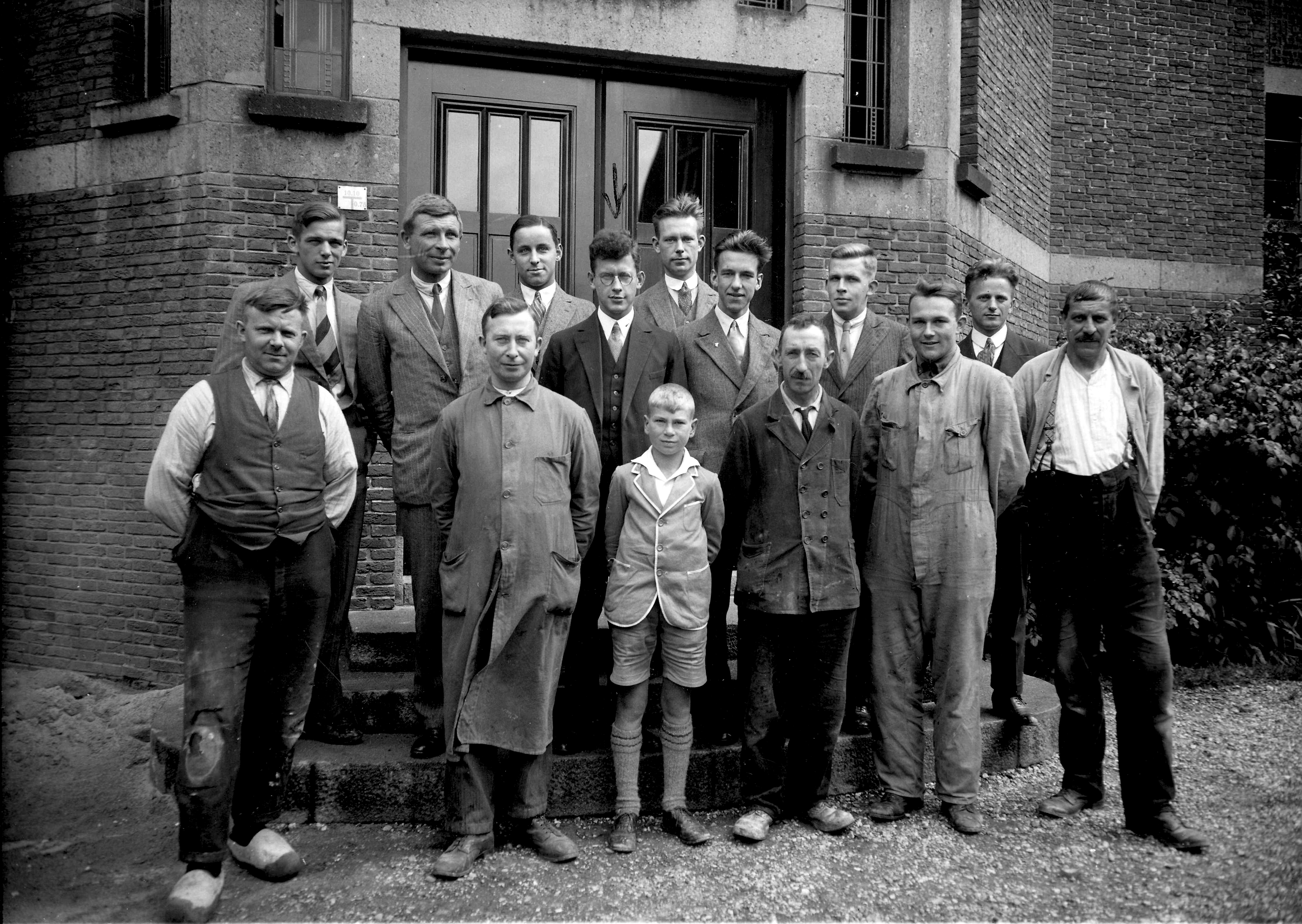
Staff of the Waterloopkundig Laboratorium in front of the Civil Engineering Department building at Delft University of Technology, 1931. PJ Wemelsfelder is fourth from the left in the back row. Jo Thijsse is second from left in the back row.

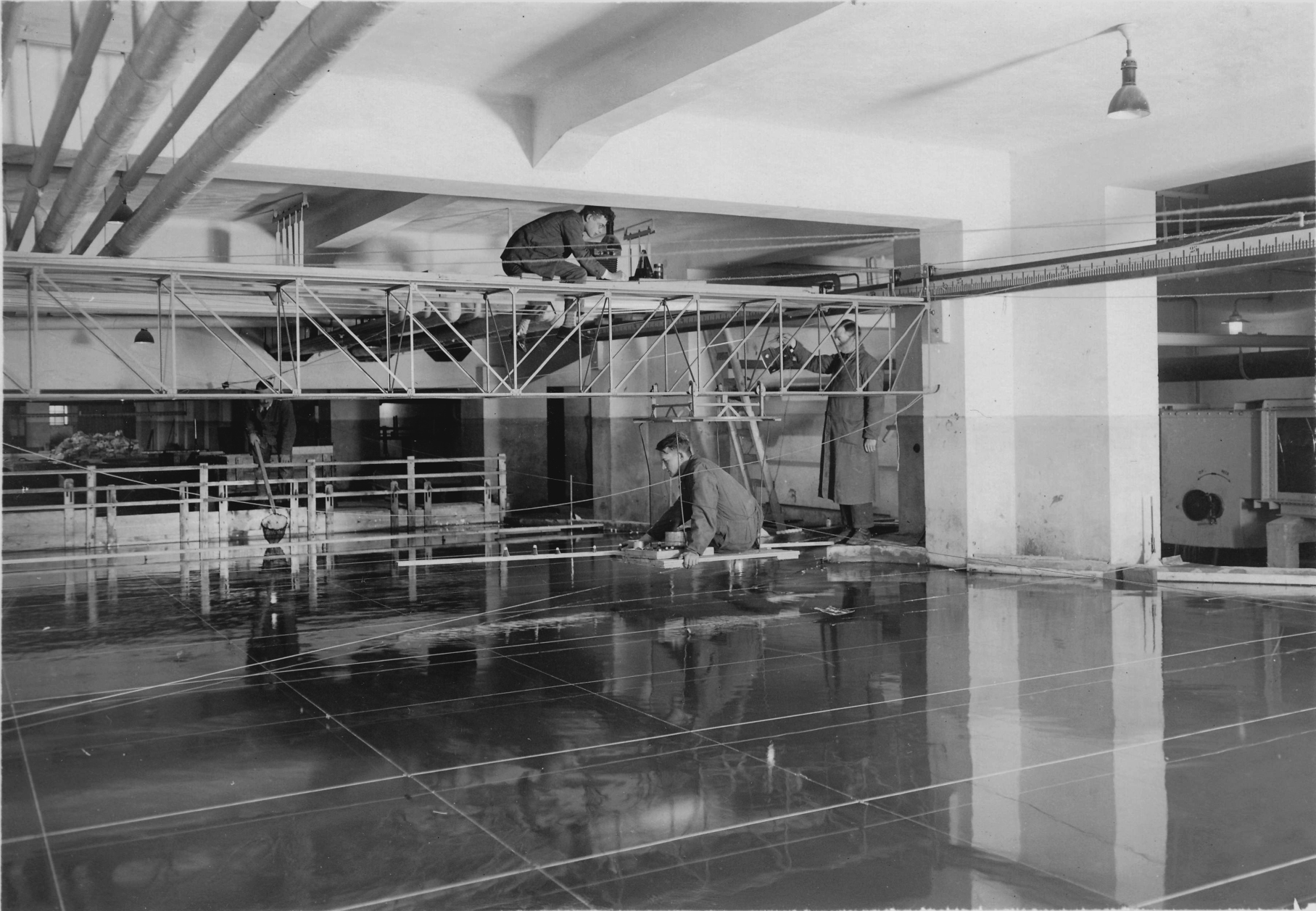
PJ Wemelsfelder and an assistant at work in the Waterloopkundig Laboratorium (Hydraulic Research Laboratory), 1931.

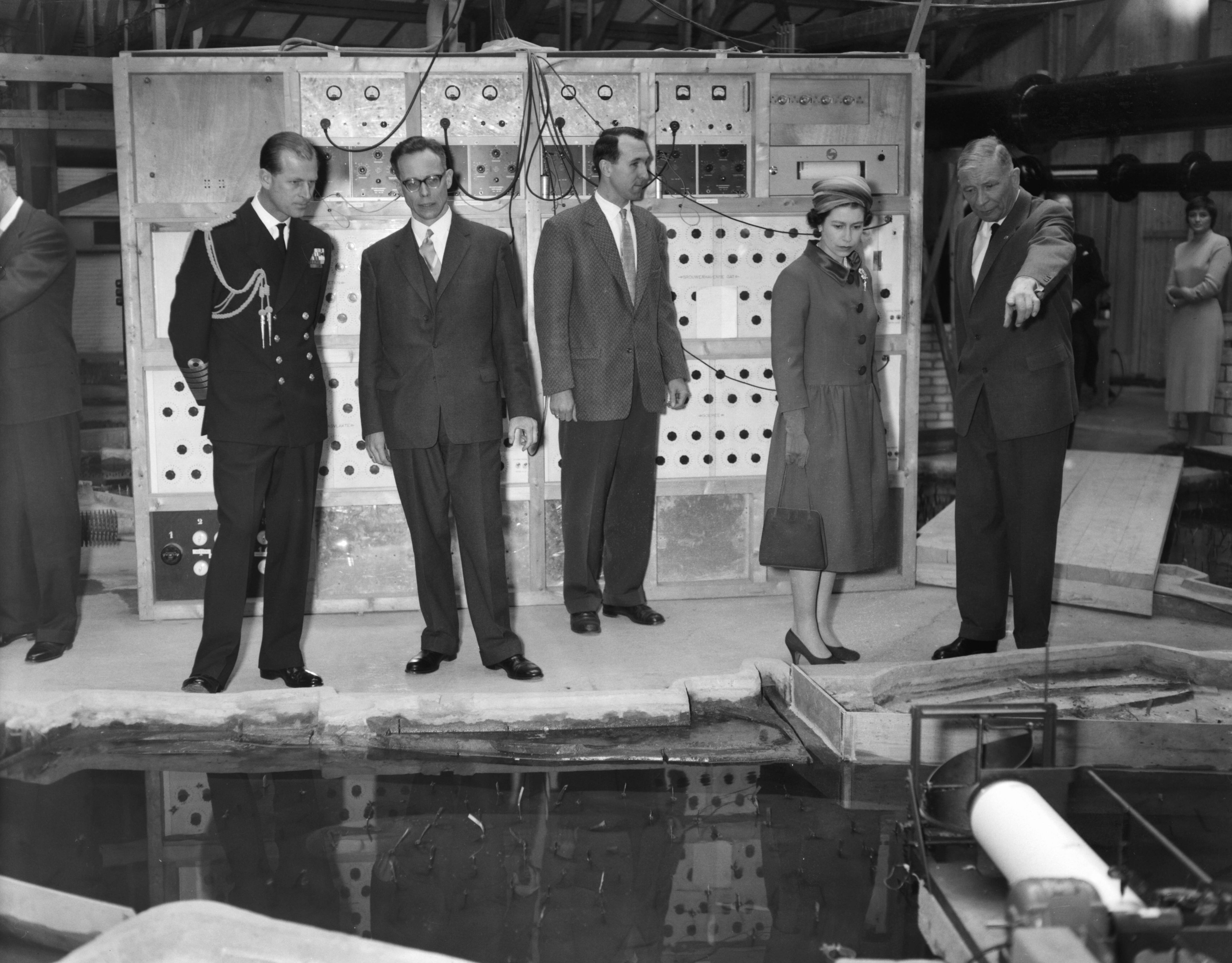
Jo Thijsse (on the right) during the visit of Elizabeth II and Prince Philip, Duke of Edinburgh to the Waterloopkundig Laboratorium in Delft, 1958.

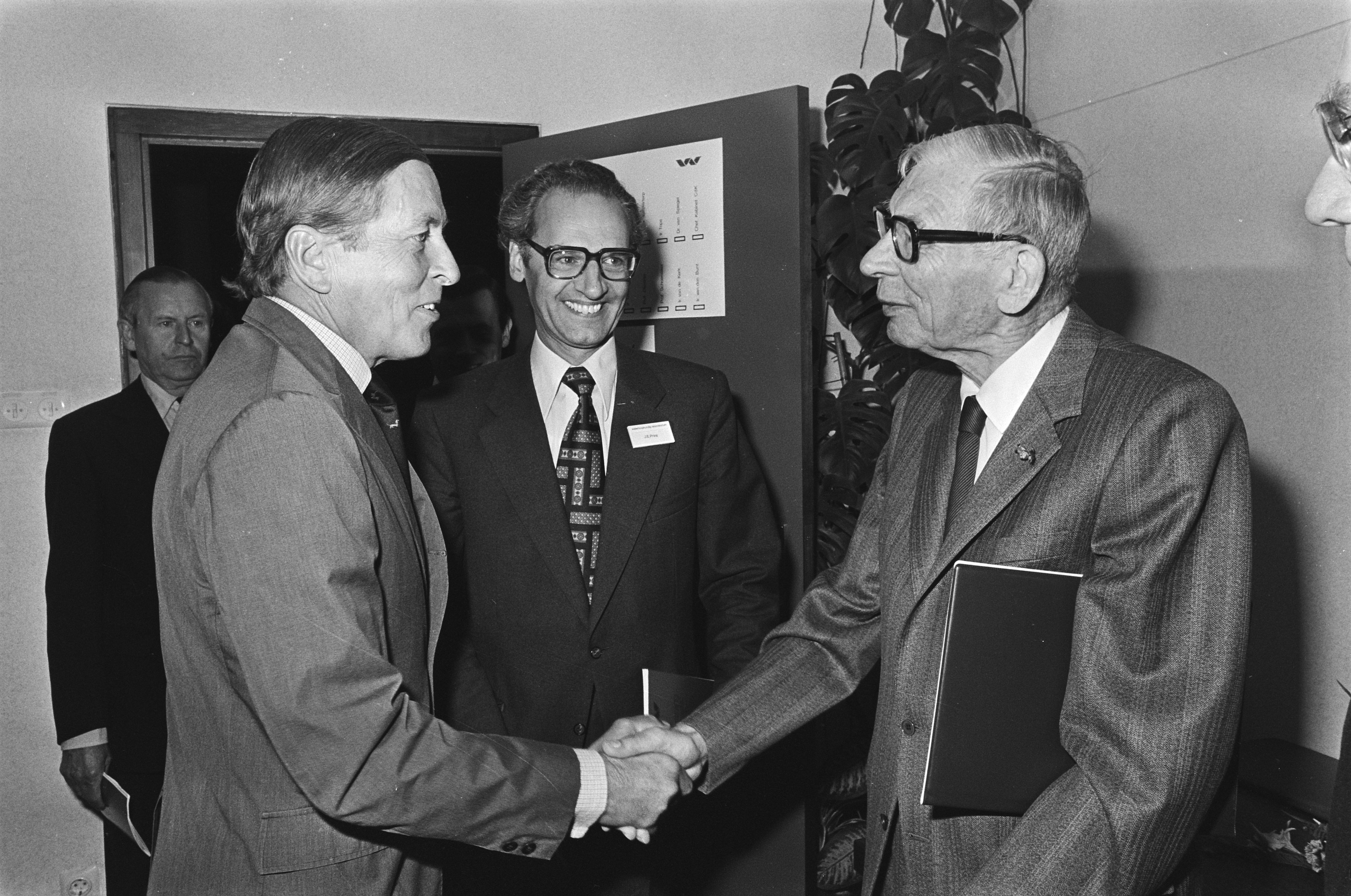
Prince Claus of the Netherlands greets Jo Thijsse at the opening of a colloquium at the Waterloopkundig Laboratorium, Delft, 1977.

The Delft laboratory in 1941

Modelling undertaken during the design and preparations for the construction of the Volkerakdam, at the de Voorst facility.

== See also ==
- Flood control in the Netherlands
- Zuiderzee Works
- Rijkswaterstaat
- Delta Works
