= IJkdijk =

Coordinates: 53.149499°N 7.189865°E

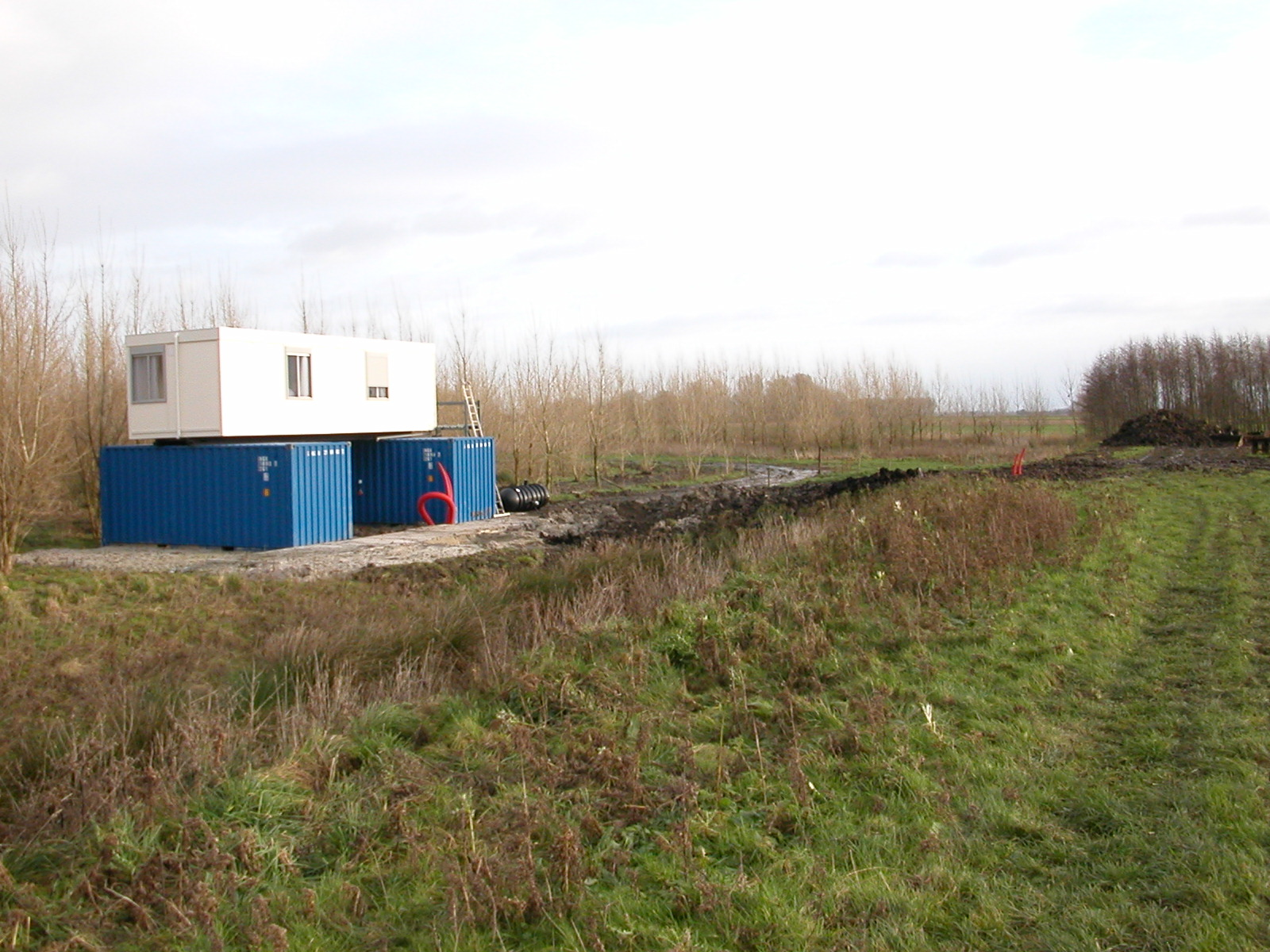
Observation post at the IJkdijk dike field lab

The IJkdijk is a facility in the Netherlands to test dikes and to develop sensor network technologies for early warning systems. Furthermore, the sensor network will be able to detect many water-related environmental factors that affect the health of humans such as pollution and biological changes. Disasters on rivers and coastal waters are also detected.

In studies of dike stability, about eighty dikes will be destroyed and establish, ultimately, a relation between the sensor readings and the future of the dike. Hence the (in Dutch) good-sounding name IJkdijk: dijk=dike and ijk is from the Dutch word ijken=to calibrate (models). Clearly the most urgent goal here is to forecast dike failures. In contrast to popular belief, most disasters with dikes occur because they are too wet and not because they are too low. Another major source of dike failures are streams of water flowing through the dike, ultimately destroying, through erosion, the dike from the inside. A detection system for these failure mechanisms might be cheaper, and safer than the alternative: over-dimensioning by adding more clay. As dike improvements are very costly, e.g. 500 euros per meter, there is ample financial room to pay for the sensor system. The IJkdijk will also increase the geophysical understanding of dike behavior. A better understanding of dikes, expressed in a sensor-based early warning system in dikes, prevents unnecessary and costly over-dimensioning. That is good news for the owners of millions of kilometers of dikes that exist nowadays and the developers of millions of kilometers of dikes that will be constructed in the future.

== Driving forces ==
Failed section of peat levee at Wilnis, August 2003

Dike innovations are no luxury. With the expected climate changes, the land subsidence, the increased economic value of the low-lying areas as a result of economic prosperity, and the declining acceptance of calamities by the general public, many countries of world need to invest substantially in flood protection to keep the risk of flooding at an acceptable level. Especially developing countries seek new lands for housing and industry which are frequently found close(r) to rivers. Here building dikes is equivalent to economic growth. As investments in dikes are in the same order of magnitude as investments in economic development, developing countries will benefit most from smarter, cheaper and safer dikes.

== Design goals ==
River embankment at Bergambacht after field test, November 2001

In many cases, protection against flooding is not only determined by the height of the embankments, but merely by the strength of the embankments. Most of the weak spots in the embankments collapse because of a lack of strength with regard to stability or internal erosion rather than be flooded. The key to a better utilization of the existing embankments and thereby reduction of the flood risks is to find ways to determine the very processes which undermine the strength of embankments with a high degree of certainty. The system must ultimately be able to sense weaknesses in tens of thousands of kilometers of embankments.

Determining failure processes of embankments is still a research field in development. It is clear that the strength of embankments depends on a large number of parameters which are hard to determine. Calculation methods for embankment strengths are available, but there seems to be a significant uncertainty, or gap, between the calculated strengths and the actual ones. Because of the huge investments involved and the increasing costs of maintenance and management for the regional water boards this is a very unsatisfactory situation. Systematic experiments are needed to calibrate the models. This enables the design of correctly sized embankments. Furthermore, a primary design goal are models, when fed by real time data from sensors in dikes, calculate the short and long time future of the embankment system. Most importantly they can report if immediate safety issues are at stake.

== IJkdijk consortium ==
The IJkdijk (‘Calibration dike’ (or embankment, levee)) is an initiative of the research institutes TNO ICT and Deltares, the Dutch national water board research foundation STOWA (Stichting Toegepast Onderzoek Waterschappen), regional development agencies NOM (Investerings- en Ontwikkelingsmaatschappij voor Noord-Nederland) and IDL. The plan emerged to build test embankments to enable the systematic testing of various types of new sensor, actuator and communication technologies, both during construction and the entire lifetime of an embankment. The embankments and the corresponding data infrastructure are set up in such a way that ensures that any future technologies can be tested. Furthermore, the IJkdijk is an open innovation environment where companies have been invited to join the experiments. About 50 companies are enlisted now.

== IJkdijk results ==
The IJkdijk enables to overstress embankments to failure using diverse and realistic methods in a controlled and reproducible manner. This will provide knowledge of:

- sensor, actuator and communication technology for embankment monitoring;
- enhanced geophysical knowledge of failure mechanisms and computer models that forecast these failure mechanisms;
- the practical and economical feasibility of systems tested for use in large-scale applications;
- technologies for large scale sensor, actuator and communication technology that support GEOSS technologies;

Thus, the IJkdijk project provides practical technologies for organizations dealing with water management everywhere in the world.

== New technologies ==
Several new (sensor) technologies may contribute to a more accurate, cheaper and/or faster determination of the relevant parameters in the various processes which may lead to embankment failure, resulting in a better picture of the actual strength and the current protection level of the embankment and enabling measures in a more timely and location-specific manner. This is of great importance. Intensive monitoring of the strength:

- reduces costly over-dimensioning of embankment reinforcements, or the alternative, widening and deepening of the river system;
- enables transparent and reproducible decision-making during imminent calamities;
- enables improved determination of the effectiveness of innovative reinforcement technologies;
- increases the accuracy of the results of periodical safety assessments of embankments, such as the five-yearly safety assessment in the Netherlands enforced by the Dutch law, providing a continuously up-to-date picture of the actual safety situation;
- may contribute to establish the priorities and effectiveness of measures such as the river realignment works currently in preparation for the Lower Rhine river system in the Netherlands.

There is a growing need for new methods to measure the various key parameters related to embankment safety. But solutions exist, while new solutions are under development.

== Testing new technologies ==
Although there is a growing need for a more continuous and objective manner of measuring and monitoring, at the same time there is too little knowledge to evaluate the favourability of current technologies. There are a number of reasons for this:

- There are no generally accepted selection criteria for applying a specific technology;
- Most available technologies may have a proven track record in laboratory conditions or in fields different from those in which the regional water boards operate, but they have no track record in real field situations relevant to the water boards;
- Often, there is insufficient clarity for the district water boards about the profitability of the different technologies and systems in practice: what will this investment yield?
- There is general need among the regional water boards, but the actual need has not yet crystallized.

In view of the gap between the suppliers for embankment technologies on the one hand, and the regional water boards with their questions on the other hand, the test facility of IJkdijk is being set up. The fieldlab shows and evaluates technologies for an audience of water management bodies. Furthermore, the new insights in the geophysical processes of dikes and their monitor systems can be translated to well-considered actions, embankment designs and accurate maintenance planning.

Sensor technology in and around embankments to forecast future failures

== Project objectives ==
The first IJkdijk, built in December 2006, destroyed by wave overtopping experiments in November 2007. It is 14 meters long, 4 meters high and wide

The objectives of the IJkdijk project are:

1. To study the applicability of sensor technologies in controlled field situations for the inspection and monitoring of flood defences as performed by the water boards;
2. To develop know-how on the development of embankment failure mechanisms with the use of applicable sensor technologies to develop a warning system for embankments, levees and dams;
3. To use sensor technologies to investigate the current state of embankments in greatest detail over thousands of kilometers.
4. To stimulate the business prospects of those companies who are involved with the project.

The commercial parties will focus on development of the technologies, while the research institutions will concentrate on development of knowledge. The failure mechanisms which are to be monitored will be central in the project.

In a brainstorm session with several experts from regional water boards, the department of public works and the inspecting authorities, the following questions have been formulated from the point of view of the water management bodies:

- What processes occur within embankments and what are their effects on potential failure mechanisms?
- What are the indicative parameters and what is the relation between these parameters and the occurrence of a failure mechanism?
- Which decisive actions can be distinguished when a calamity is imminent?
- Which technologies are suitable to measure the indicative parameters in existing embankments? How to choose from the technologies offered? What should be the spatial intensity and the frequency of the measurements?
- What are the costs and benefits for the implementation of new monitoring technologies?

In the initial phase of the project these questions will be addressed and converted into experiments to be conducted.

== Technical facilities ==
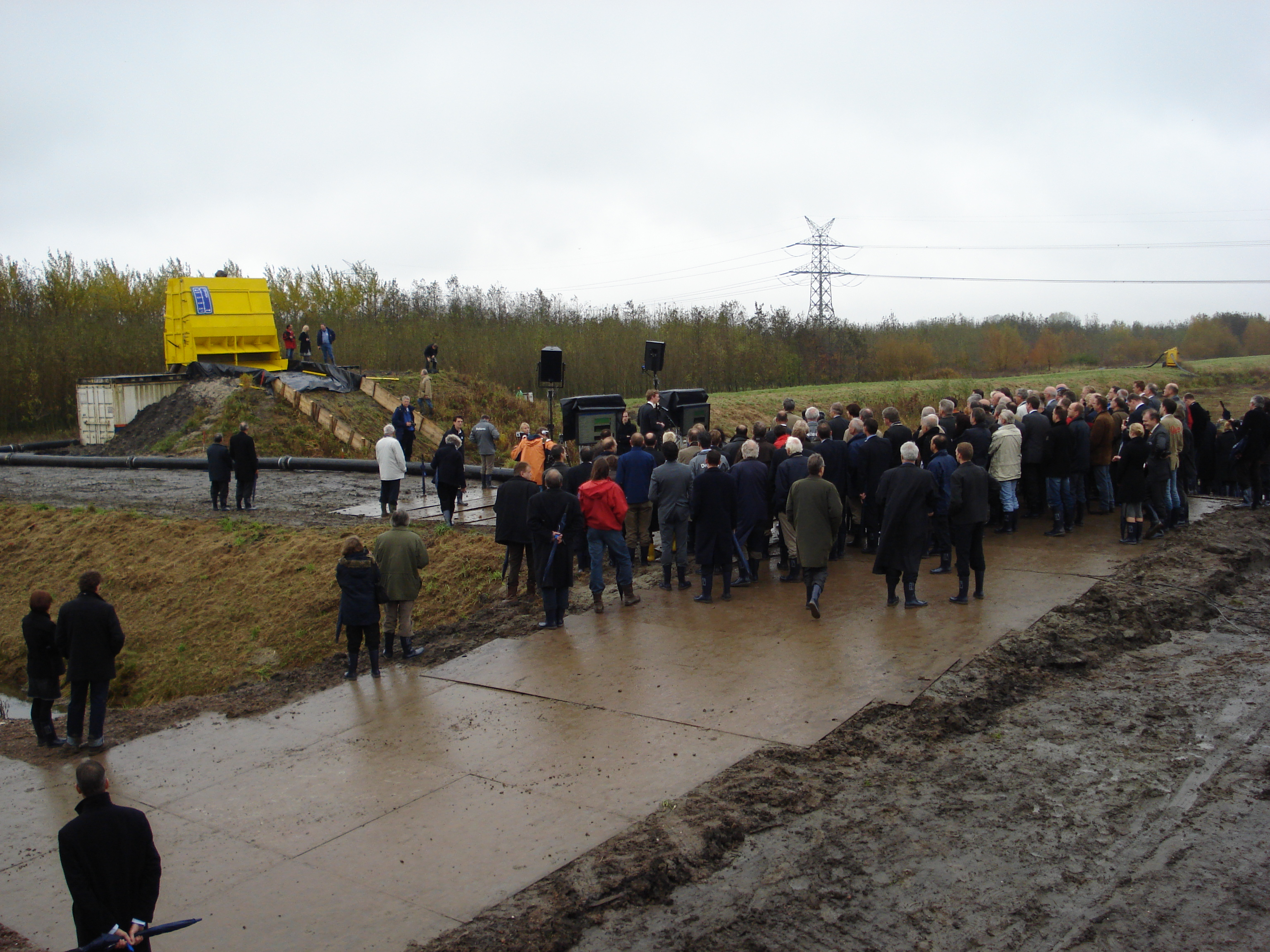
The first dike at the opening of the IJkdijk facility on November 2, 2007. The yellow construction is a wave over topping simulator that is able to flood the land side of a dike with 14m^{3} waves.

The IJkdijk provides an infrastructure for to connect various sensor and actuator systems. It supplies them with energy and fixed and wireless communication means. Furthermore, a camera system and weather monitor is present to augment any other observations.

The infrastructure is developed in several phases, allowing flexibility and, above all, the possibility to learn and improve. Initially, only the infrastructure to conduct the first experiments and the reference measurements will be implemented, and the network infrastructure required for the connection of the sensors for subsequent experiments. The following are considered:

- An application platform with a number of basic applications (GIS visualization, command and control facilities, ...);
- A multiparty data acquisition, data publishing and analysis infrastructure;
- A regular network for the permanent sensors;
- The permanent sensors;
- Access points to the network for the experiment-specific sensors. These will be based on both cable and wireless network technology;
- A power source.

Over time, the infrastructure will grow based on the demands and requirements of the experiments to be conducted. The next figure shows a plan view of the location with the spatial planning of the larger elements planned so far.

== Experiments ==
A movie that shows the last wave thrown over a dike at the opening of the IJkdijk facility on November 2, 2007

The intention is to study systematically a wide range of geophysical processes in embankments. At first, a series of experiments is conducted in which previously applied technologies such as CTD divers, flux meters and humidity meters are used. These will be read continuously via remote (wireless) network monitoring. As stated in the table above, experiments are always combinations of a failure mechanism to be studied, a loading scheme, and several measuring methods. At present, experiments are in preparation related to stability, erosion due to wave over-topping, sliding due to steady state overflow and internal erosion (piping).

Apart from experiments to increase the knowledge of failure mechanisms, there will also be experiments that aim more specifically at testing new sensor technologies and their relevance to flood defence management. Together, both types of experiments will contribute substantially to the effectiveness and efficiency of embankments both in the Netherlands and abroad.

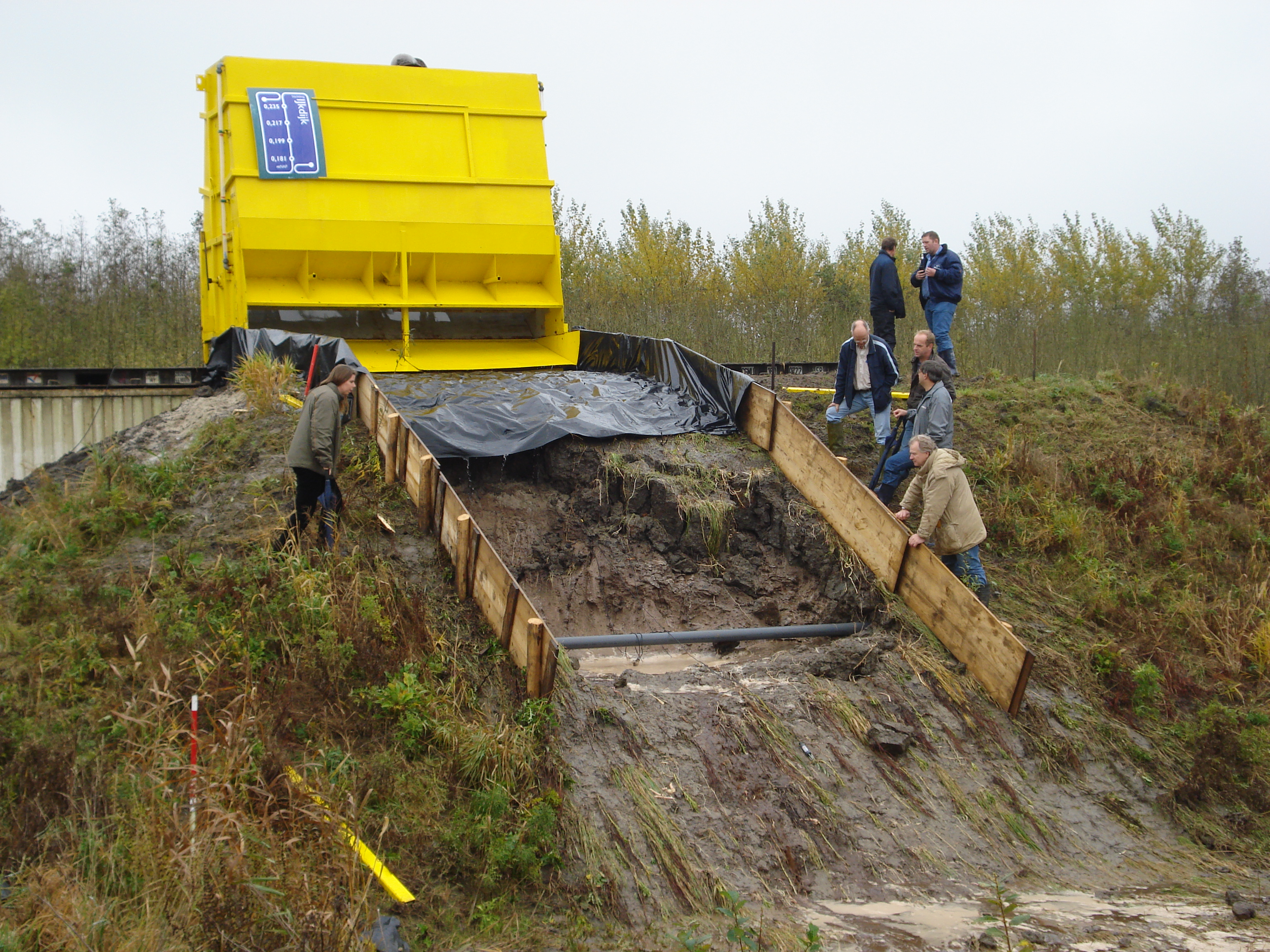
A gaping hole was created by the wave over topping experiment on November 2, 2007.

== The Macrostability Experiment ==
The dike that collapsed on Saturday September the 27th at 16.02h was part of an experiment that gathered data about the stability of dikes. Furthermore, several sensor systems were tested in the experiment. More than a terabyte of data was obtained, a globally unique data set. The experiment was the first scientific success of the IJkdijk.

The dike was roughly 100m long, 30m wide and 6m high and consisted of a nucleus of white sand and a shell of clay. A drainage system was placed at the bottom of the sand nucleus, allowing the addition or removal of water. Containers were placed on top of the dike, eventually to be filled with water. The subsoil was charted carefully, whilst the dike contained numerous proven and experimental sensor systems. In addition to that, the dike was carefully monitored from the outside by lidar and visual and infrared camera systems, and, of course, numerous people. When the dike was completed, on Friday September 26, a ditch was cut in the soil and subsoil. After 16 hours, at 08.00h on Saturday 27 of September 2008, the water level in the dike was raised. At 16.02h, the dike collapsed.

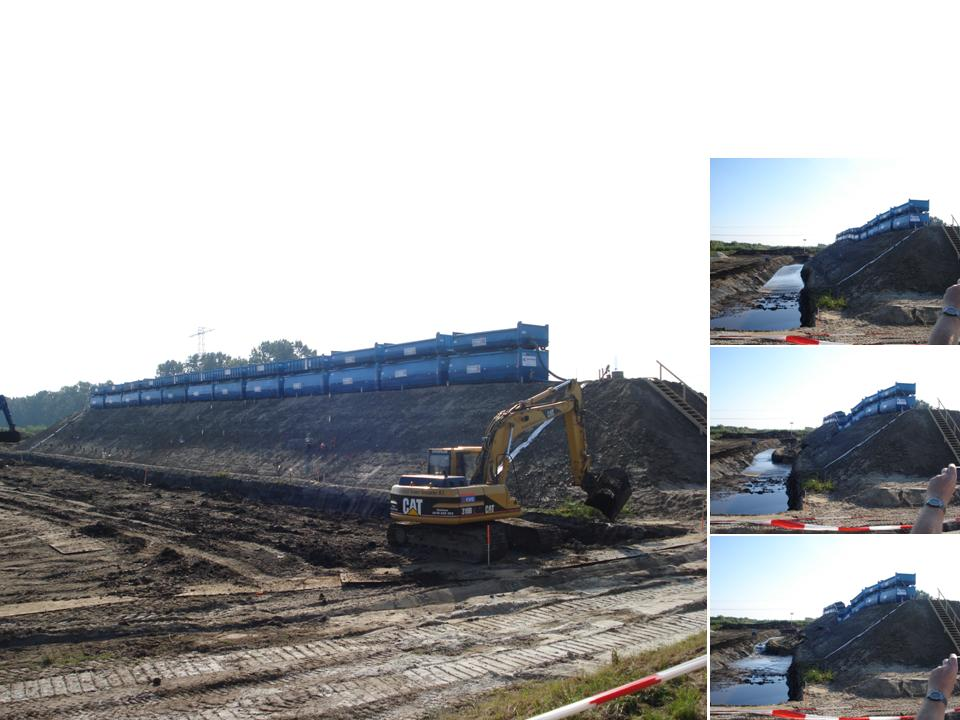
The dike built and destroyed in the Macrostability Experiment that was conducted in September 2008
