= Pieter Jacobus Wemelsfelder =

Dutch civil engineer

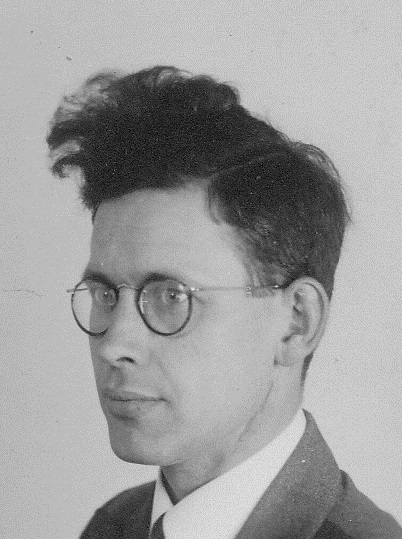
- Pieter Jacobus Wemelsfelder (1907-1995), pictured in 1943
- Born: 18 November 1907; Goes, The Netherlands
- Died: 1 July 1995 (aged 87); Almen, The Netherlands
- Citizenship: Netherlands
- Education: Delft University of Technology
- Known for: Probabilistic approach to determining flood levels for storm surges
- Scientific career
- Fields: Civil Engineering; Hydraulic Engineering; Hydrometry
- Workplaces: Rijkswaterstaat; Waterloopkundig Laboratorium

Pieter Jacobus (P.J.) Wemelsfelder (18 November 1907 – 1 July 1995) was a Dutch hydraulic engineer who made significant contributions to the field of hydrometry in the Netherlands, and in hydraulic engineering internationally. In addition to his involvement in the design and planning of the Delta Works, he published widely and is notable for the first use of probability theory in the design of flood levels.

Wemelsfelder introduced a systematic approach to understanding and predicting the occurrence of storm floods, considering both the characteristics of the sea's probable and possible heights and the human and economic interests at stake. His methodology involved creating frequency curves for storm floods, using a standard frequency curve applicable to different gauges worldwide, and classifying storm floods based on their probability of exceedance. This classification system helped in understanding the variability of maximum storm floods over different time periods.

Wemelsfelder emphasised the importance of considering both the period and risk when determining design levels, advocating for a two-dimensional approach to flood protection. His approach required establishing a frequency curve for each gauge, determining the period during which the risk is present, and choosing an acceptable total risk value for serious damage, generally not exceeding 10%, and as low as 0.1% for critical areas. He noted the need to balance the costs of safety measures with the economic and human values they protect, and recognised the importance of incorporating contingency in design to account for uncertainties.

The body set up by the Dutch Government in response to the 1953 North Sea Flood, the Delta Commission, adopted Wemelsfelder's probabilistic methods, setting design levels based on a risk of total loss of 1 in 1,000 years for critical areas, ensuring a high level of safety. His contributions have had a lasting impact on coastal engineering and continue to inform the design and implementation of flood defences in the Netherlands and beyond.

== Life ==
Wemelsfelder was born in Goes, the son of Jacob Abraham Wemelsfelder and Jannigje Verschoor, in 1907. After completing his studies at the Delft University of Technology, Wemelsfelder worked at the Waterloopkundig Laboratorium and later at Rijkswaterstaat, where he served as the head of the Hydrometric Department of the Water Management and Movement Directorate. One of his major accomplishments was the development of methods and instruments for hydrometry in the Netherlands.

Wemelsfelder introduced a probabilistic approach to determining design flood levels for storm surges in the Netherlands. Prior to his work, flood protection measures were based on a deterministic approach that relied on the highest previously recorded water levels, along with some estimation. For example, the height of the Afsluitdijk was determined based on the highest observed storm surge, with the height of the crest determined based on insufficient data about wave run-up. This became apparent soon after the first significant storm surge following the completion of the dike in December 1936, when water in the Wadden Sea reached to around half a metre below the dike.

In 1938, Wemelsfelder introduced a significant change in the design approach through a brief note on the frequency of storm surges, in which he carried out a statistical analysis of water levels measured between 1888 and 1937 at Hoek van Holland to derive the probability distribution of such events. Wemelsfelder determined a statistical estimate of the cumulative distribution of sea-level heights during high tide, and determined that the exceedance frequencies $n(h)/n$, where $n(h)$ represents the number of times the level $h$ was exceeded during $n$ years, closely followed a straight line when plotted on logarithmic paper.

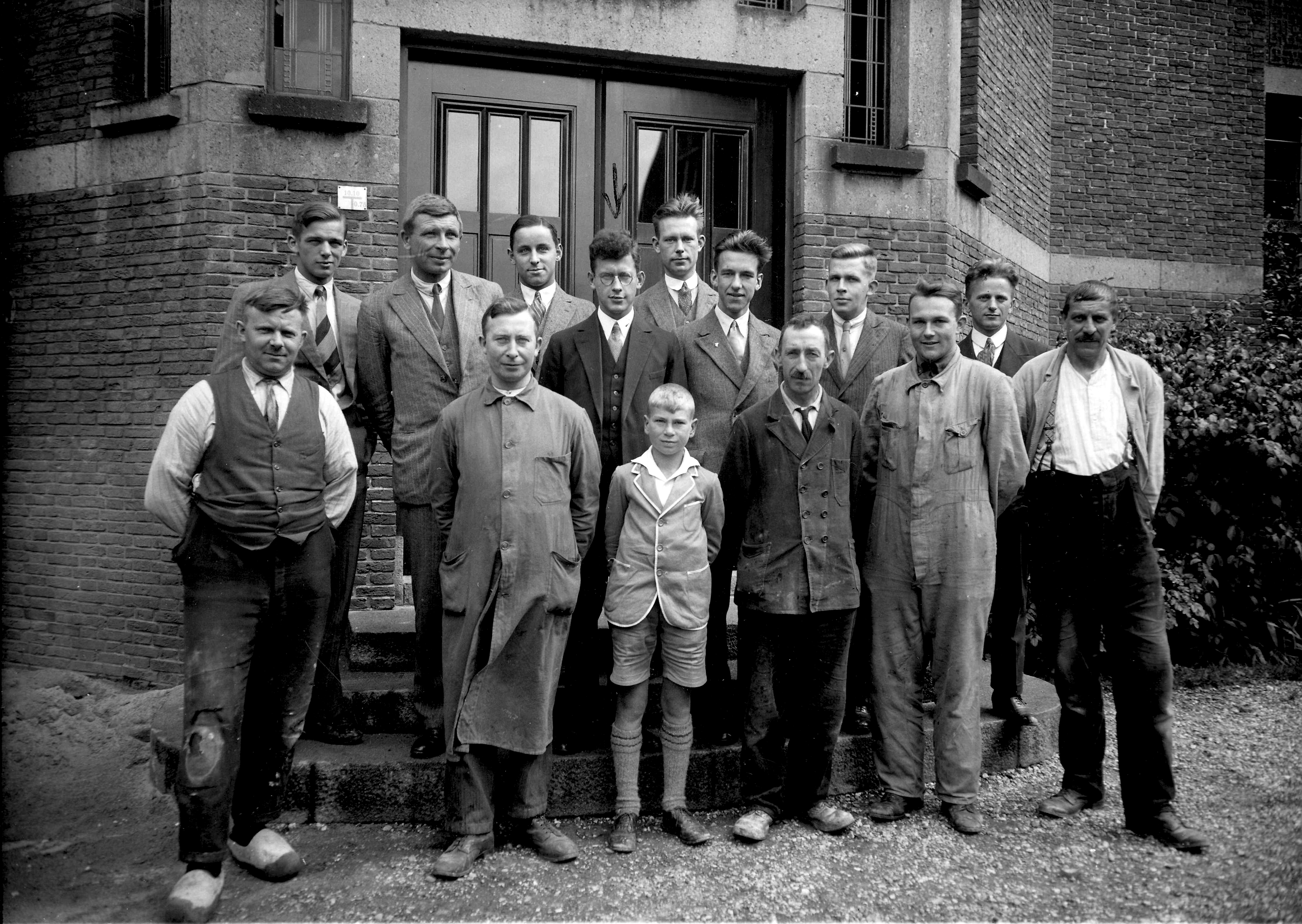
Waterloopkundig Laboratorium (Hydraulic Research Laboratory) staff in Delft, 1931. Wemelsfelder is fourth from the left in the back row.

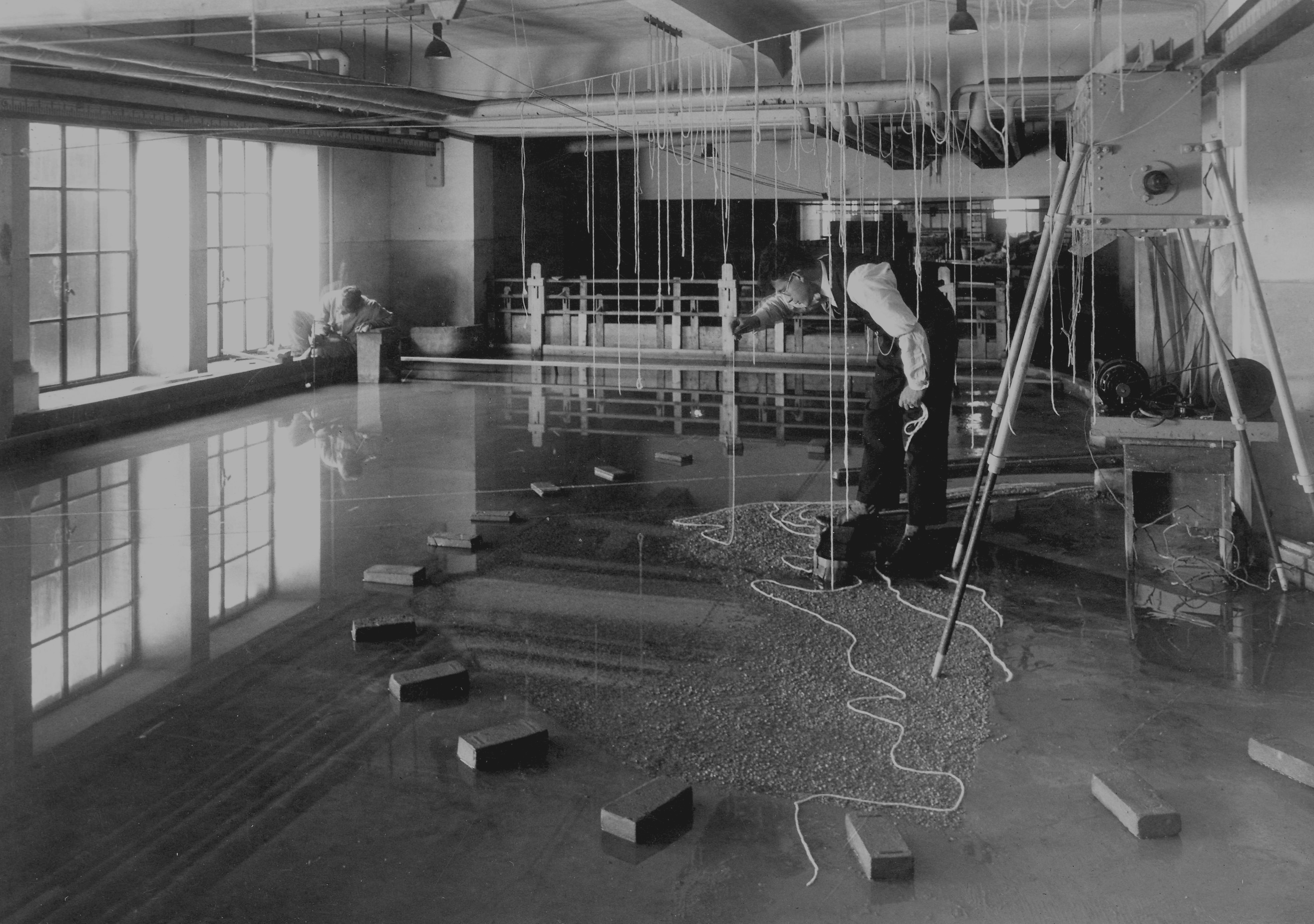
Wemelsfelder at work in the Waterloopkundig Laboratorium (Hydraulic Research Laboratory), 1931.

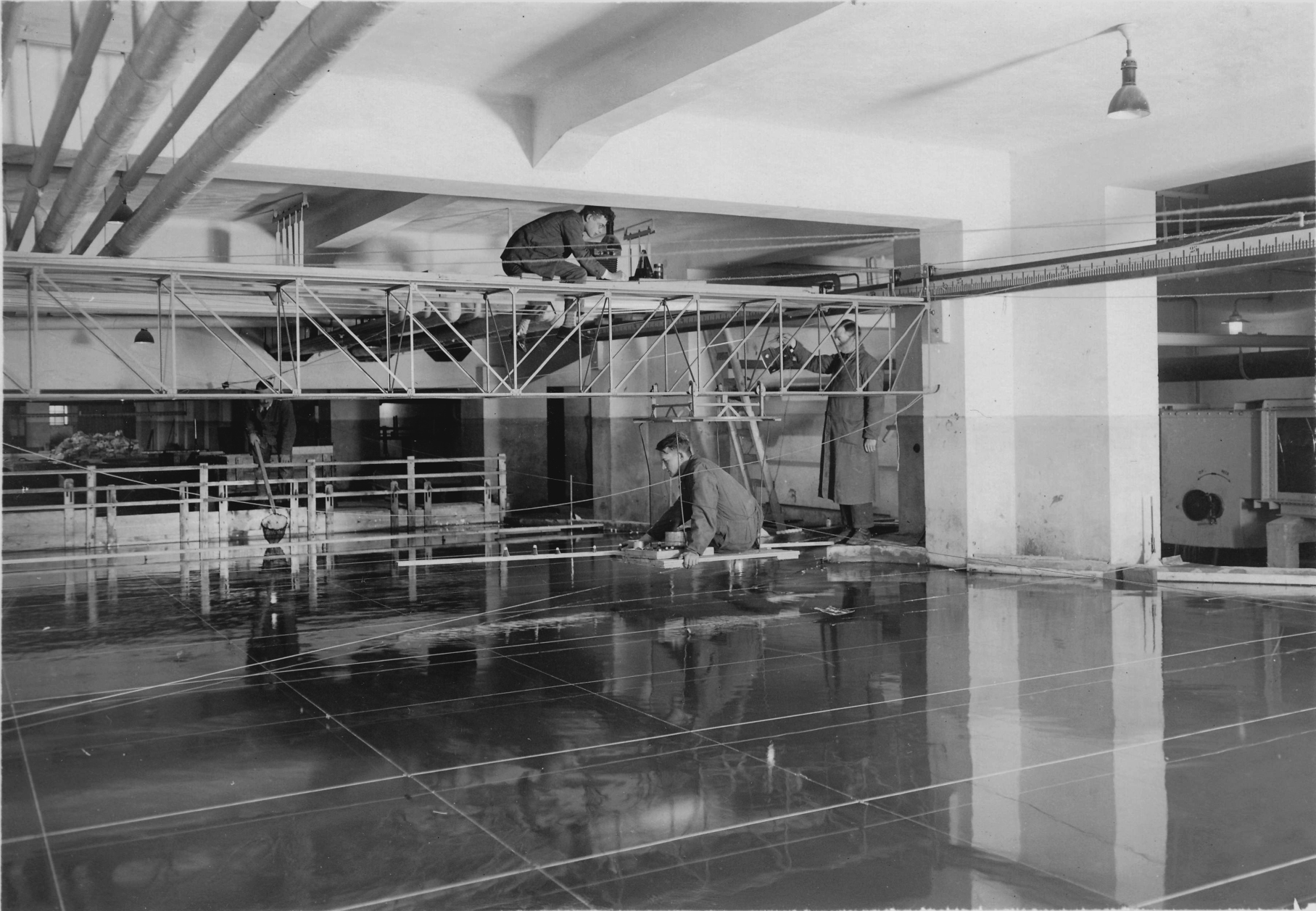
Wemelsfelder and an assistant at work in the Waterloopkundig Laboratorium (Hydraulic Research Laboratory), 1931.

Prior to Wemelsfelder's work, S.H.A. Begemann had applied statistical methods to hydrological aspects such as precipitation and runoff for irrigation. In the United States, publications on stochastic hydrology such as those by Allen Hazen and others had been appearing since the early twentieth century. However, Wemelsfelder's statistical analysis of water levels measured between 1888 and 1937 at Hoek van Holland enabled the derivation of a probability distribution of storm surges. He published his findings in the Dutch journal de Ingenieur in March 1939, which revolutionised the way flood protection measures were designed in the country.

By using a frequency curve on a logarithmic scale, Wemelsfelder showed that an effective statistical overview of storm surges could be obtained. His 1939 paper demonstrated that the structure of the distribution of storm surges over the years, both in terms of strength and frequency, can be accurately represented by a probability law.

In 1939, the establishment of the Stormvloedcommissie (Storm Surge Commission) was prompted by concerns regarding the state of many dikes in Zeeland. Under the leadership of Johan van Veen, the commission adopted Wemelsfelder's probabilistic approach as the basis for determining the probability of water level exceedance and the calculation of dike heights. This was a departure from the earlier approach of relying solely on previously recorded high water levels.

Despite the commission's recommendation to raise the levels of the dikes, the Government of The Netherlands did not take action, and the dike system remained vulnerable throughout World War II. After the war, attention turned to rebuilding efforts, and this was exacerbated in 1953 further to a catastrophic flood that claimed 1,836 lives in The Netherlands, and caused billions of guilders in infrastructural damage.

The storm surge associated with the 1953 flood saw water levels reach 3.85 metres above Normaal Amsterdams Peil (NAP) at Hoek van Holland, higher than the crest height of the dikes which had been determined based on previously recorded highest water levels (3.28 metres above NAP) at the same location.

In response, the Dutch Government formed the Deltacommissie (Delta Commission), which was charged with making recommendations for reducing the risk of such disasters. The commission relied heavily on the analysis and solutions put forth by the Storm Surge Commission, which had already adopted Wemelsfelder's probabilistic approach for determining dike heights.

The Delta Commission recommended a target exceedance frequency of 10^{−4} per year as the basis for design levels in central Holland, and its work led to the enactment of the 1958 Delta Act. Wemelsfelder's work actually considered a factor of safety that increased the exceedance frequency to that which corresponds to m=10^{−5}, where m is the acceptable risk. This corresponds to a total loss figure of 1% in a 1000-year period.

Wemelsfelder made significant contributions to the Delta Commission's analysis and recommendations, and was active in research throughout his career, publishing a number of technical papers in Dutch and English. His findings continue to inform flood protection measures in the Netherlands today.

== Activities outside hydraulic engineering ==
In 1946, Wemelsfelder published a 358-page monograph focused on topics such as cultural development, societal change, the structure of an organic society, governance, legislation, and international order, entitled Plan voor een redelijke Nederlandse samenleving (English: Plan for a reasonable Dutch society).

The book set out Wemelsfelder's thoughts on how The Netherlands could organise society in political and economic fields in the immediate aftermath of the Second World War and dealt with issues including combating unemployment, the establishment of a savings credit bank, reorganisation of banking and industry, pensions, the introduction of child allowance and the introduction of a separate income for married women.

== Selected publications ==
- 1938: Wemelsfelder, P.J. "Beknopte Nota over de Frequenties van Stormvloeden" (Brief Note on the Frequencies of Storm Surges). Link.
- 1939: Wemelsfelder, P.J. "Wetmatigheden in het optreden van stormvloeden" (Regularities in the Occurrence of Storm Surges). Link.
- 1946: Wemelsfelder, P.J. "Plan voor een redelijke nederlandse samenleving" (Plan for a reasonable Dutch society). Link.
- 1948: Wemelsfelder, P.J. "Verslag metingen Voedingsduiker Zuid-Willemsvaart" (Report on Measurements of the Feeding Culvert of the Zuid-Willemsvaart). Link.
- 1948: Wemelsfelder, P.J. "Verslag metingen Voedingsduiker Maastricht: 2de serie" (Report on Measurements of the Maastricht Feeding Culvert: 2nd Series). Link.
- 1954: Edelman, T. "Doorbraakvrije zeedijken" (Breakthrough-Free Sea Dikes), with comments by Wemelsfelder, P.J. Link.
- 1960: Wemelsfelder, P.J. "On the use of frequency curves of stormfloods." Coastal Engineering Proceedings, 7(33), 617–632. Link.
- 1965: Jelgersma, S., Smits, H. & Wemelsfelder, P.J. "Zeespiegelbeweging en bodemdaling: voordrachten gehouden voor de algemene vergadering van de Nederlandse Vereniging voor Landaanwinning, gehouden op 1 mei 1963" (Level Movement and Land Subsidence: lectures given at the general meeting of the Dutch Association for Land Reclamation, held on 1 May 1963). Link.

Between 1965 and 1972, Wemelsfelder prepared reports on various storm surges which occurred in the Netherlands. All reports from this period are available at TU Delft Repository: Link:

- 1965: "De stormvloed van 13 februari 1965" (The Storm Surge of 13 February 1965).
- 1965: "De stormvloed van 2 november 1965" (The Storm Surge of 2 November 1965).
- 1966: "De stormvloed van 16 november 1966" (The Storm Surge of 16 November 1966).
- 1966: "De stormvloed van 30 november 1966" (The Storm Surge of 30 November 1966).
- 1967: "De stormvloed van 23 februari 1967" (The Storm Surge of 23 February 1967).
- 1967: "De stormvloed van 28 februari 1967" (The Storm Surge of 28 February 1967).
- 1967: "De stormvloed van 5 oktober 1967" (The Storm Surge of 5 October 1967).
- 1969: "De stormvloed van 2 februari 1969" (The Storm Surge of 2 February 1969).
- 1969: "De stormvloed van 10 november 1969" (The Storm Surge of 10 November 1969).
- 1970: "De stormvloed van 20 februari 1970" (The Storm Surge of 20 February 1970).
- 1970: "De stormvloed van 3 oktober 1970" (The Storm Surge of 3 October 1970).
- 1970: "De stormvloed van 3 en 4 november 1970" (The Storm Surge of 3 and 4 November 1970).
- 1971: "De stormvloed van 21 en 22 november 1971" (The Storm Surge of 21 and 22 November 1971).
- 1972: "De stormvloed van 13 november 1972" (The Storm Surge of 13 November 1972).

== See also ==
- Flood control in the Netherlands
- Delta Works
- Rijkswaterstaat
- Johan van Veen
