= O. H. Hinsdale Wave Research Laboratory =

Research facility in Oregon, US

Coordinates: 44.563842°N 123.291042°W

- Established: 1972
- Research type: Wave, tsunami
- Director: Pedro Lomonaco
- Location: Corvallis, Oregon, USA
- Operating agency: Oregon State University
- Website: wave.oregonstate.edu

O. H. Hinsdale Wave Research Laboratory is a research facility in Corvallis, Oregon, United States. Operated by Oregon State University’s Coastal & Ocean Engineering Program within the Department of Civil, Construction, and Environmental Engineering. Built in 1972, the laboratory was designated as a tsunami research location by the National Science Foundation in 2001. It contains two wave basins and a long wave flume. The Tsunami Wave Basin is the largest tsunami simulator in the world.

== History ==
Construction on the laboratory began in 1972. In 1973, the facility opened with the wave flume used to simulate the ocean waves. The circular wave and rectangular wave basins were both finished in 1990. That year the lab received a grant from the United States’ Office of Naval Research for $8.6 million to examine wave structures, which helped to pay for the two new wave basins.

In 2001, the Wave Research Laboratory was awarded a $4.8 million grant to study tsunamis by the National Science Foundation. The remodeled portion of the facility, the Tsunami Wave Basin, was completed in 2003. In 2007, the foundation granted the laboratory $1.1 million to study storm surges and other waves related to hurricanes.

== Facility ==
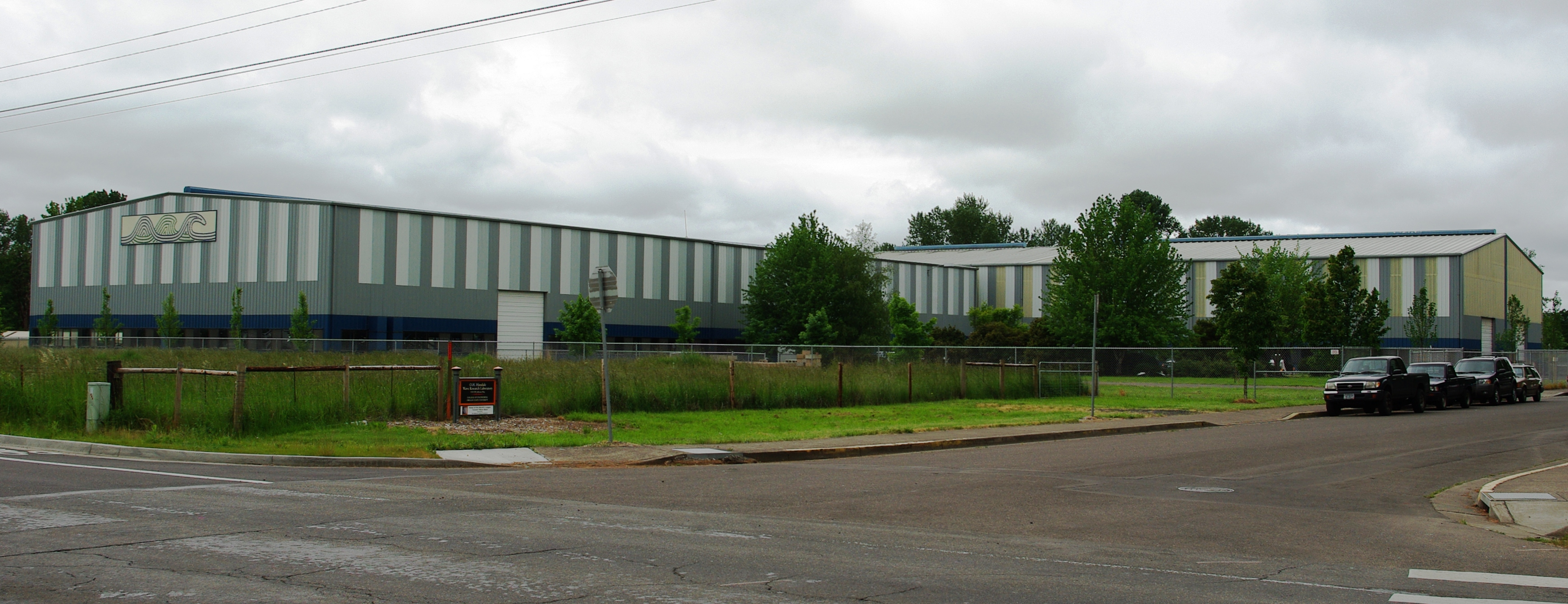
Exterior of the lab

The first wave research equipment was the wave flume. It is 360 feet (110 m) long, 12 feet (3.7 m) wide, and 15 feet (4.6 m) deep. It is used to simulate the waves of the ocean, and creates 5-foot-high (1.5 m) waves with currents strong enough to surf on. The wave flume holds up to 350,000 gallons of water. It can create both regular and irregular waves at intervals as short as .5 seconds apart. Research is mainly on the effect of waves on structures such as breakers. As the largest of this type of wave flume in North America, it can also be used to study the transport of sediment in the ocean. In 2022, a removable flap wave generator was supplied to the laboratory for use anywhere in the wave flume. The wave maker, built by Edinburgh Designs Ltd., is comprised by six electrically actuated dry-back paddles, self contained in a single steel box and capable of generating mid-scale regular, irregular and user defined waves in a typical range of periods from 0.5 to 4 s at a maximum depth of 4 m.

A circular basin was added in 1990 to research the movement of sediment along beaches, among other research topics. It is also used to study ocean currents. The Circular Wave Basin can create waves up to 2 feet (0.61 m) in height in the 5 feet (1.5 m) deep structure that is 50 feet (15 m) in diameter.

The rectangular basin has 30 wave generators that can be used to simulate a storm in the controlled environment of the lab. In 2001, it was expanded to a size of 87 feet (27 m) by 160 feet (49 m) with a depth of 6.5 feet (2.0 m) to facilitate tsunami research. Research includes the effects of a tsunami on coastal population centers and possible survival options. The Tsunami Wave Basin was the first in the world dedicated to tsunami research, and is the largest and most advanced facility in the world. Additionally, the tsunami laboratory has a variety of above and below the water cameras, wave gauges, and microphones. They also operate a Tsunami Experimental Databank that allows other researchers to access video and data over the internet. Scientists work in collaboration with the Pacific Marine Environmental Laboratory operated by the National Oceanic and Atmospheric Administration. Researchers from universities around the United States use the basin for tsunami wave simulations.

== See also ==
- Delta Flume
- Neptune Wave Power
