= Neptune Wave Power =

Electricity company in Texas, United States

Neptune Wave Power, LLC
- Company type: Limited liability company
- Industry: Electricity
- Headquarters: Dallas, Texas, United States
- Products: Electrical power
- Website: www.neptunewavepower.com

Neptune Wave Power, headquartered in Dallas, Texas, United States, is a company that produces electricity using wave power harnessed via floating buoys. Small scale prototype testing of the buoy has taken place at the Hinsdale Wave Research Laboratory at Oregon State University.

In 2011, Neptune Wave Power received a grant from Oregon Wave Energy Trust Commercialization Grant Program. The company held US Patent 8046108 (System and method for converting ocean wave energy into electricity) and US Patent 8004104 (Method and apparatus for converting ocean wave energy into electricity).
