= Deltares =

Dutch research institute

Animation of the wave generator at Deltares

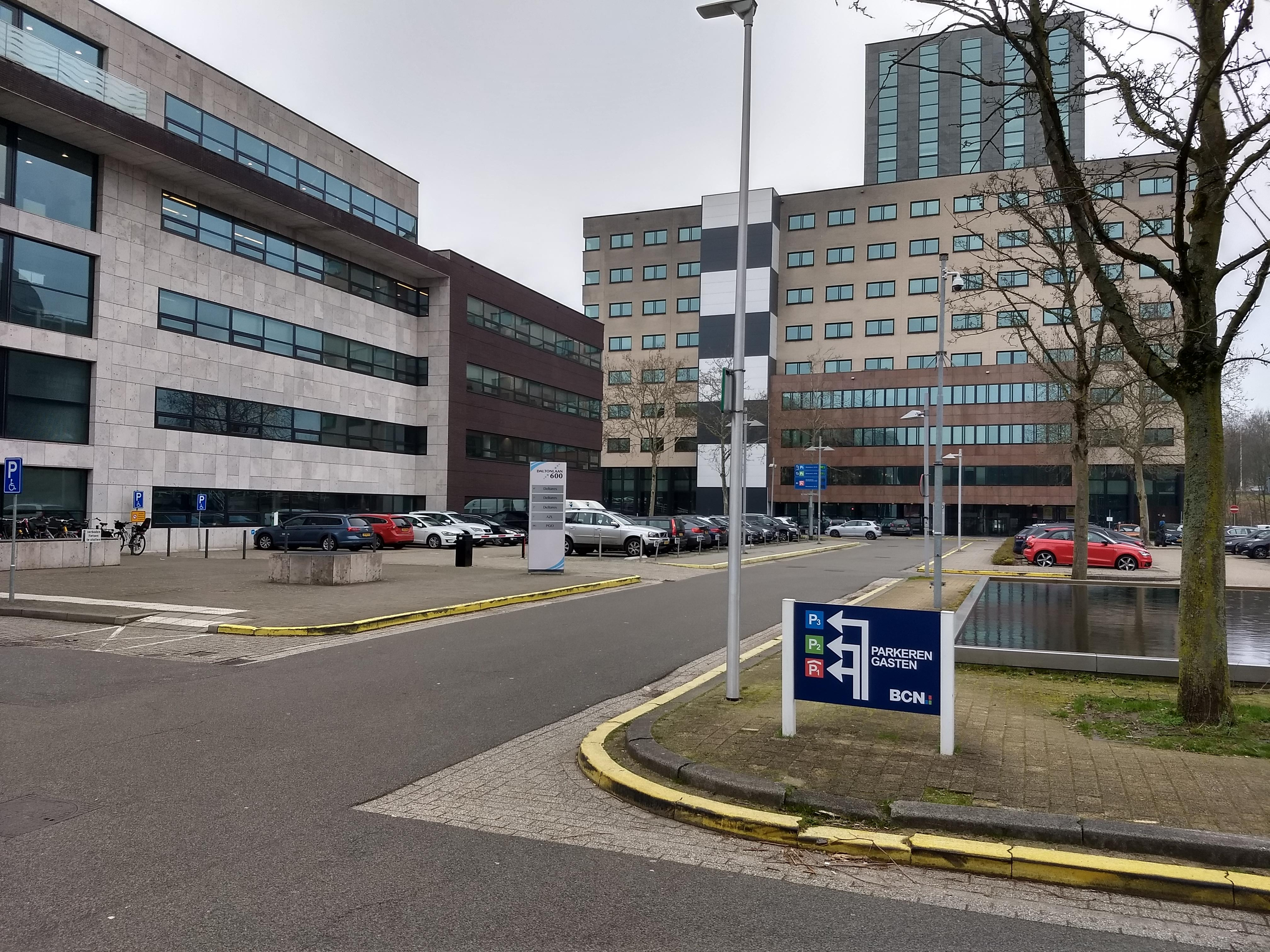
Office in Utrecht

Deltares is a major technological institute in the Netherlands specialising in hydraulic engineering research and consulting, along with water management, geotechnics, and infrastructure. The organisation's research mainly focuses on rivers and river deltas, coastal regions, and offshore engineering. As of 2020, Deltares employed over 750 full-time equivalent (FTE) staff members from 42 nationalities, located in Delft and Utrecht. The turnover in 2020 was €112 million.

== Areas of expertise ==
Deltares operations focus on, among other things:

- Water management;
- Water safety;
- Hydraulic engineering;
- Groundwater;
- Soil management;
- Geology;
- Ecology;
- Water quality;
- River and coastal morphology.

== Facilities ==
In addition to desk study research, Deltares undertakes physical model research and development of computer applications. For physical model research, Deltares has several wave flumes (including the Delta Flume), wave basins, and lock facilities. Facilities are also available for research on pumps and pipelines.

For geotechnical research, Deltares provides facilities such as the geocentrifuge, a water and soil flume (for dredging research), and a geotechnical laboratory.

== History ==
Deltares was established on January 1, 2008, following the findings of the Wijffels Committee, from the merger of:

- GeoDelft
- Delft Hydraulics, previously known as the Waterloopkundig Laboratorium (Hydraulic Research Laboratory)
- Parts of TNO–Building and Underground
- Parts of the specialized services RIZA, RIKZ, and DWW from Rijkswaterstaat.

Initially, the name Delta Institute was considered. However, this name had been used until 1992 by another organization: the Delta Institute for Hydrobiological Research. This organization is now part of the Netherlands Institute of Ecology (NIOO-KNAW).By 2008, the Delft laboratory had become known by the English name WL | Delft Hydraulics, and in an effort to consolidate knowledge with similar institutes, it was merged with other research institutes and sections of Rijkswaterstaat, becoming known by its present name.

== See also ==
- Delta Works
- Flood control in the Netherlands
- Rijkswaterstaat
- Waterloopkundig Laboratorium
- Zuiderzee Works
