= Delta Flume =

Coordinates: 51°59′2.66″N 4°22′56.69″E

animation of the Delta Flume

Delta Flume is a 300 meter long man-made flume with a wave generator that is capable of producing waves as tall as five meters, the world's largest artificial waves. It is located at the Deltares Research Institute outside the city of Delft, Netherlands. It is used to simulate forces generated by natural waves in order to test materials used in the construction of dykes. Especially for testing the effect of vegetation the full scale testing is essential.

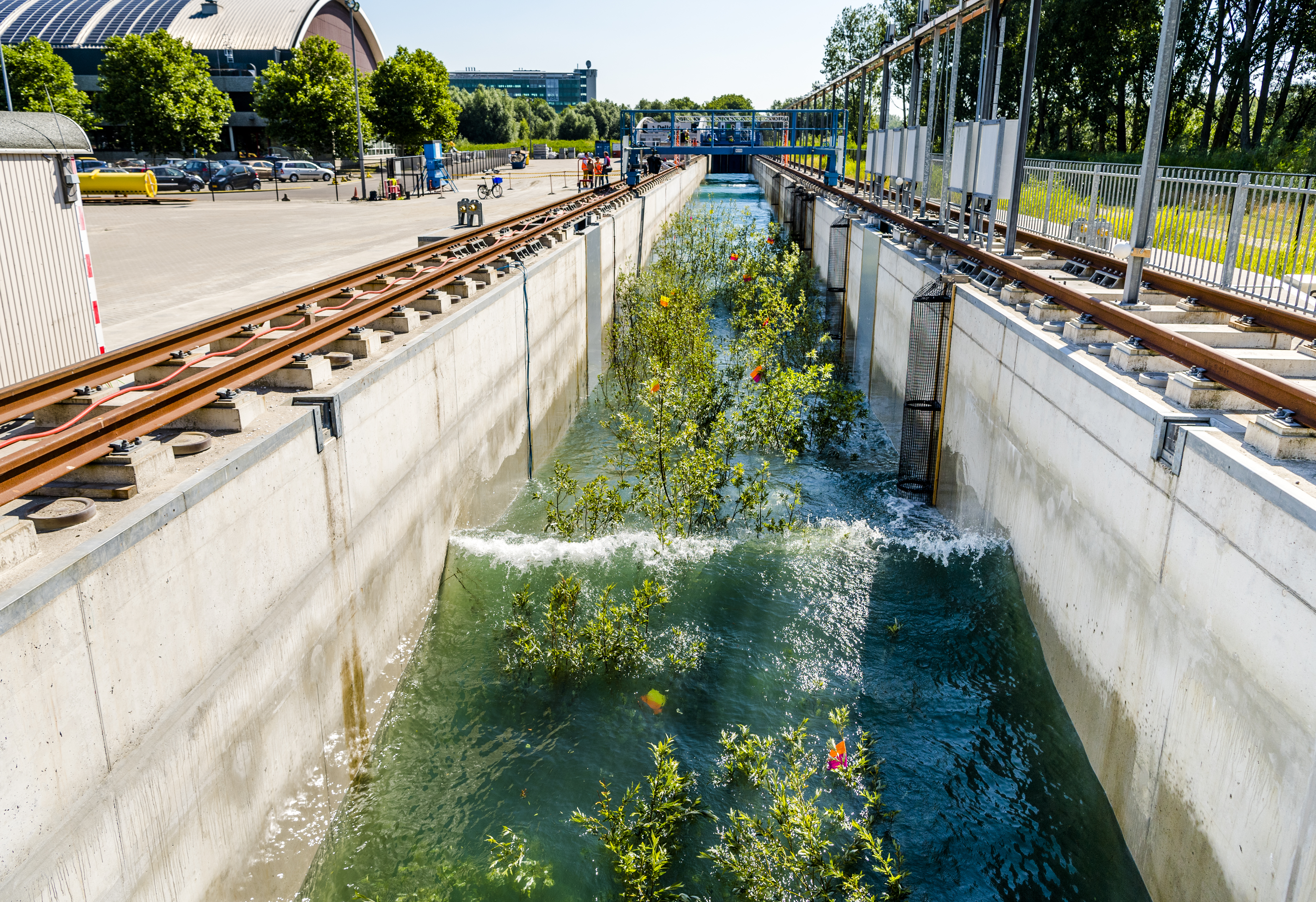
Research on the wave damping effect of willow trees

== See also ==
O. H. Hinsdale Wave Research Laboratory
