= Theodor Rehbock =

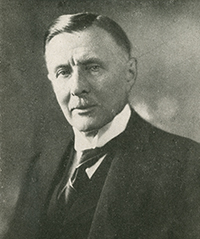
- Theodor Rehbock, ca. 1920
- Born: 12 April 1864; Amsterdam
- Died: 17 August 1950 (aged 86); Baden-Baden
- Education: • Technical University of Munich • Technische Universität Berlin
- Known for: Rehbock weir Rehbock dentated sill
- Scientific career
- Fields: Fluid dynamics
- Workplaces: University of Karlsruhe

Theodor Christoph Heinrich Rehbock (12 April 1864 in Amsterdam – 17 August 1950 in Baden-Baden) was a German hydraulics engineer, and professor at the University of Karlsruhe.

Theodor Rehbock's father was an overseas merchant. Rehbock studied at the Technische Hochschule München (now Technical University of Munich) and the Technische Hochschule Charlottenburg (now Technische Universität Berlin) during 1884–90, receiving his degree in 1892.

Rehbock performed studies on water supply and hydraulic engineering in many countries. Further, he built a hydroelectric power station in the Murg river in Baden. In 1899, Rehbock became professor of hydraulics at the University of Karlsruhe. Where he started a hydraulics laboratory, in 1901, of which he was the director until 1934. The hydraulics aspects of most large projects in Germany – as well as in many other countries in the world – were tested here. For instance the Afsluitdijk for the separation of the Zuiderzee (Dutch for South Sea) from the Wadden Sea in the Netherlands. After his retirement, the laboratory has been named the "Theodor Rehbock Laboratory".

Rehbock was rector (university president) of the University of Karlsruhe three times: in 1907–08, 1917–18 and 1925–26.

In 1935, an initiative of Theodor Rehbock, Wolmar Fellenius and Rudolf Seifert lead to the establishment of the International Association for Hydro-Environment Engineering and Research (IAHR).

In 1901 Rehbock married Margarete Küster. She gave birth to four sons and one daughter.

== Honours ==
- Rehbock weir – a device to accurately measure the discharge in open channel flows.
- Rehbock dentated sill – for kinetic energy dissipation at the end of a stilling basin, into which the spillway of a large dam ends. This, in order to prevent or reduce scour.
- Theodor Rehbock Medal – of the Deutsche Vereinigung für Wasserwirtschaft, Abwasser und Abfall (DWA; German Association for Water, Wastewater and Waste), to honour members who made outstanding innovations within the fields covered by the association. This award has been established in 2007.
- Honorary doctorates from the Technical University of Munich and the Palatine Joseph University of Technology and Economics in Budapest.
- Honorary member of the Dutch Royal Institution of Engineers (KIvI) in The Hague.
- A street in Karlsruhe has been named after him.
