= Hydrometry =

Monitoring the components of the hydrological cycle

Hydrometry, sometimes called hydrometrics, is the measurement of the components of the hydrological cycle including rainfall, groundwater characteristics, as well as water quality and flow characteristics of surface waters. The etymology of the term hydrometry is from Greek: ὕδωρ (hydor) 'water' + μέτρον (metron) 'measure'. The International Organization for Standardization Tecnical Committee on Hydrometry (ISO/TC 113) formally defines the topic as "science of the measurement of water including the methods, techniques and instrumentation used".

Hydrometrics is a topic in applied science and engineering dealing with Hydrometry. It is an engineering discipline encompassing several different areas. This discipline is primarily related to hydrology but specializing in the measurement of components of the hydrological cycle particularly the bulk quantification of water resources. It encompasses several areas of traditional engineering practices including hydrology, structures, control systems, computer sciences, data management and communications.

== See also ==
- Environmental science – Study of the environment
- Stream gauge – Location used to monitor surface water flow
- Hydrology – Science of the movement, distribution, and quality of water on Earth
- Water pollution – Contamination of water bodies
- Environment Agency – Non-departmental public body in the UK
