= Frank Spaargaren =

Dutch civil engineer

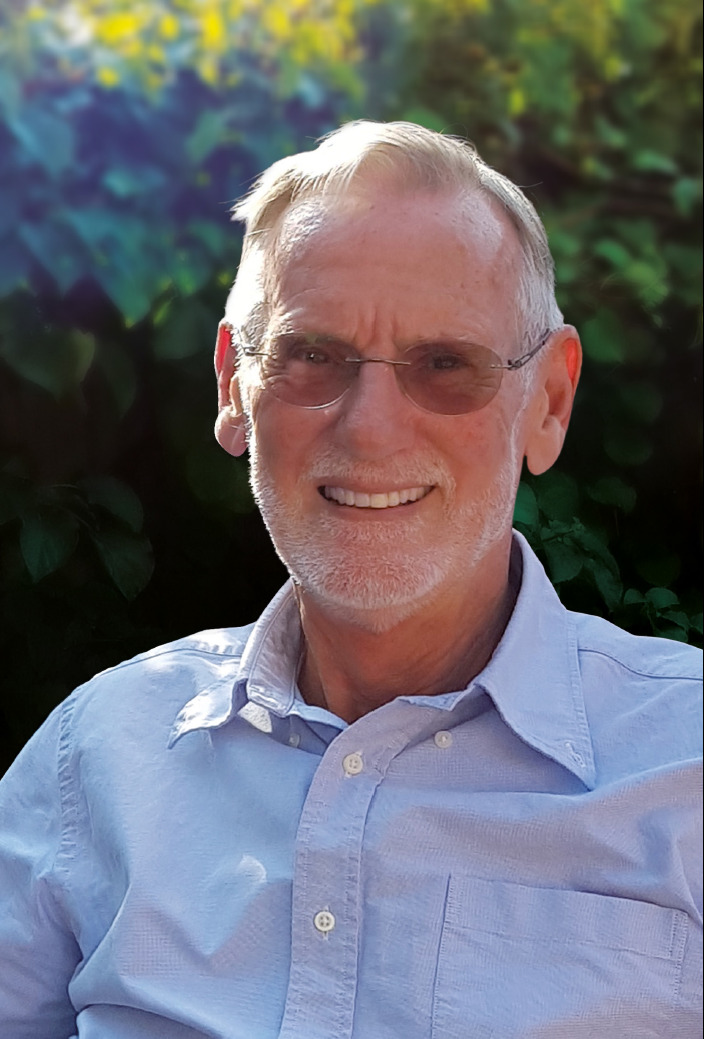
- Frank Spaargaren (1940-2020)
- Born: 20 December 1940; Haarlem, The Netherlands
- Died: 4 October 2020 (aged 79); Oosterbeek, The Netherlands
- Citizenship: Netherlands
- Education: Delft University of Technology
- Employer(s): Volker Stevin; Royal HaskoningDHV
- Known for: Oosterscheldekering
- Scientific career
- Fields: Civil Engineering; Hydraulic Engineering
- Workplaces: Rijkswaterstaat; Waterloopkundig Laboratorium

Frank Spaargaren (20 December 1940 – 4 October 2020) was a Dutch hydraulic engineer who was one of the main designers of the Oosterscheldekering and served as a director of the Waterloopkundig Laboratorium in Delft.

== Graduation and early career ==
After graduating in civil engineering from Delft University of Technology in 1964, he joined the Delta service of Rijkswaterstaat, in the hydraulic department. He supervised experiments at the Waterloopkundig Laboratorium (Hydraulic Research Laboratory).

Beginning in the early 1970s, Spaargaren became involved in the Delta Works, principally with the works to close the Eastern Scheldt, and in 1971, he took charge of the project as Head of Service Execution.

== The Oosterscheldekering ==
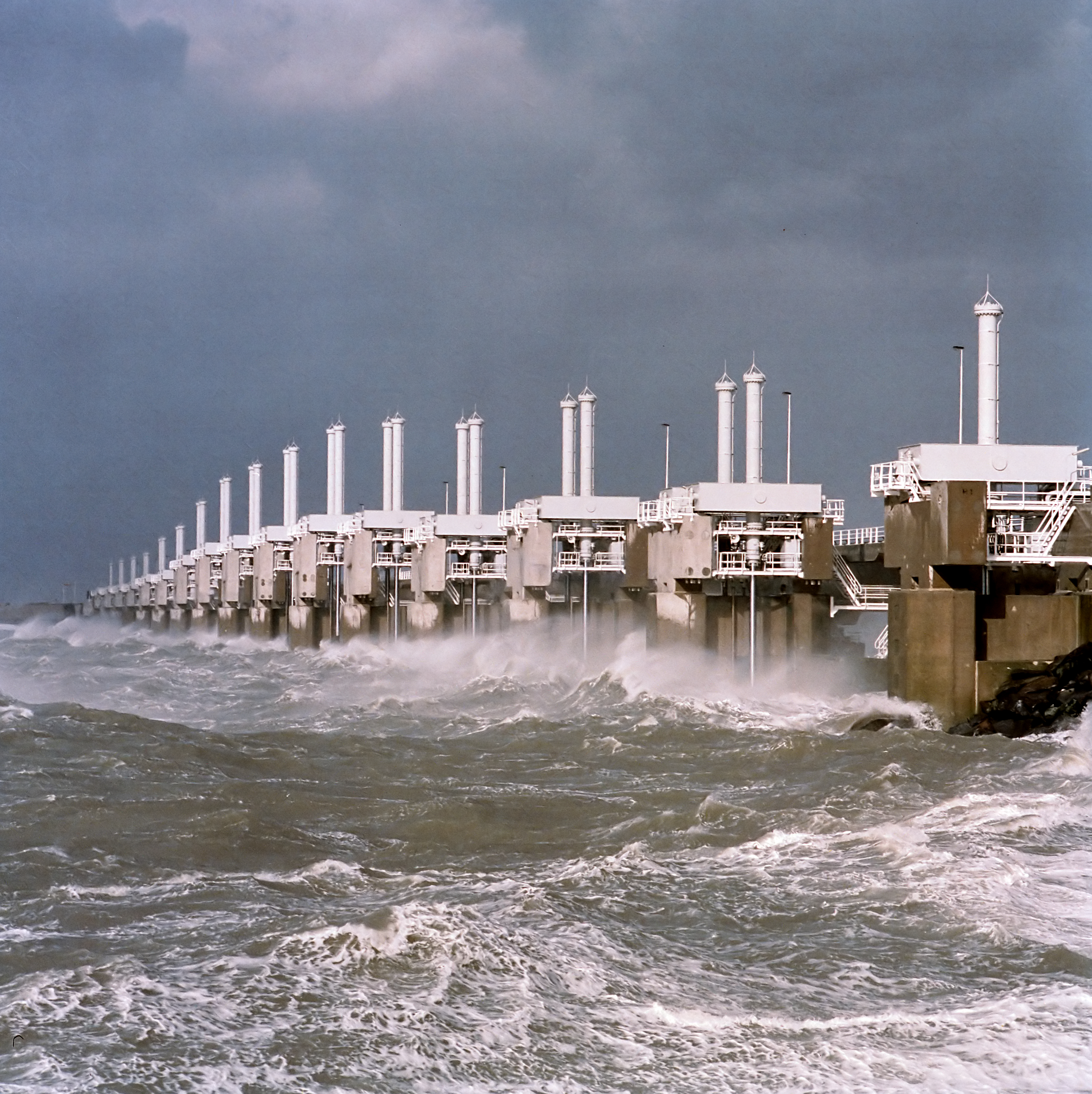
The Oosterscheldekering during a storm

The closure of the Eastern Scheldt was achieved by the construction of the Oosterscheldekering (Eastern Scheldt Storm Surge Barrier), between the islands of Schouwen-Duiveland and Noord-Beveland. At nine kilometres in length, the dam was the largest project of the entire Delta Works.

The dam had originally been designed, and partially constructed, as a fully closed structure. However, following public protests from environmental campaigners and fisheries groups, the Den Uyl cabinet decided in 1974 to make significant changes to the project and the requirements were changed to mandate a partially open dam. There was no precedent for such a structure anywhere in the world, and therefore no design codes to follow or construction experience from which to draw ideas.

Spaargaren was charged by Rijkswaterstaat with leading the design and delivery of the project from 1976, and an innovative design comprising substantial sluice-gate doors was implemented, being fitted along the final four kilometres of the dam. Ordinarily, these gates remain open, permitting natural tidal movement, but can be securely closed during inclement weather conditions.

The innovative design of the dam, led by Spaargaren and involving other key hydraulic engineers such as Jan Agema, thus ensured the preservation of the saltwater marine ecosystem, enabled continued fishing activity, and provided flood control for the land beyond the dam.

The Oosterscheldekering was successfully completed in 1986 and Beatrix of the Netherlands officially opened the dam on 4 October 1986.

De stormvloedkering is gesloten. De Deltawerken zijn voltooid. Zeeland is veilig. (The flood barrier is closed. The Delta Works are complete. Zeeland is safe).

— Queen Beatrix of The Netherlands, Public address on the occasion of the opening of the Oosterscheldekering, 4 October 1986, as noted in Delta-visie: Een terugblik op 40 jaar natte waterbouw in Zuidwest-Nederland (Delta-vision: Looking back at 40 years of wet civil engineering in the South-West Netherlands) (1986)

== Career in the private sector ==
From the early 1980s, Rijkswaterstaat began to shift away from being a technical, engineer-led organisation and began outsourcing more of the technical work and engineering design associated with its projects to consultants in the private sector. Spaargaren decided to leave the organisation and moved into contracting in 1979 by joining Volker Stevin, a company primarily engaged in dredging and hydraulic contracting.

Beginning as a contracts manager, Spaargaren later ascended to the position of head of corporate strategy. He served as a director of the company until 1987. He then moved to the engineering firm DHV, where he became the chairman of the board of directors.

In 1995, Spaargaren returned to the Waterloopkundig Laboratorium (Hydraulic Research Laboratory) in Delft, where he served as interim general director until his retirement in 1997.

== Research, publications and retirement ==
Spaargaren published a number of research reports and technical publications throughout his career, including collaborations with other notable engineers and mathematicians such as Jo Johannis Dronkers. Spaargaren published primarily on subjects related to the closure of estuaries and tidal basins, particularly up until 1979 when he left Rijkswaterstaat.

Despite retiring in 1997, he remained involved in civil and hydraulic engineering. In 2013, alongside a few of his former colleagues, he expressed concerns regarding insufficient maintenance of the bottom protections around the Oosterscheldekering. Along with other engineers, Spaargaren had expressed opposition to elements of the Dutch Government's Delta Programme Strategy, warning that it was insufficient to cope with the threat of climate change, specifically sea level rise.

He also played an instrumental role in the decision-making process pertaining to reinforcement of the Markermeer dikes. In a 2018 letter to the Dutch House of Representatives, he noted, "The dikes have proven capable of withstanding significantly higher water levels than those currently anticipated. There is a dearth of experienced design and implementation knowledge within the ministry, Rijkswaterstaat, and the water board. Experts in sub-fields and researchers are exerting too much influence on the design process".

== See also ==
- Flood control in the Netherlands
- Delta Works
- Rijkswaterstaat
- Oosterscheldekering
