= Van Oord =

Dutch maritime contracting company

Royal Van Oord
- Company type: Private
- Industry: Dredging, Land reclamation, Offshore construction
- Founded: 1868 (158 years ago)
- Founder: Govert van Oord
- Headquarters: Rotterdam, Netherlands
- Number of locations: 56
- Area served: Worldwide
- Key people: Govert van Oord (CEO); Katja Otten (CFO); Meike Salvadó-De Reede (CPO)
- Products: Palm Islands, The World, IJsselmeer, Gemini
- Revenue: ▲€2,866 million (2023)
- Net income: ▲€127 million (2023)
- Number of employees: 5,766 (2023)
- Website: Vanoord.com

Royal Van Oord is a Dutch maritime contracting company that specializes in dredging, land reclamation and constructing man made islands. Royal Van Oord has undertaken many projects throughout the world, including land reclamation, dredging and beach nourishment. The company has one of the world's largest dredging fleets.

== History ==
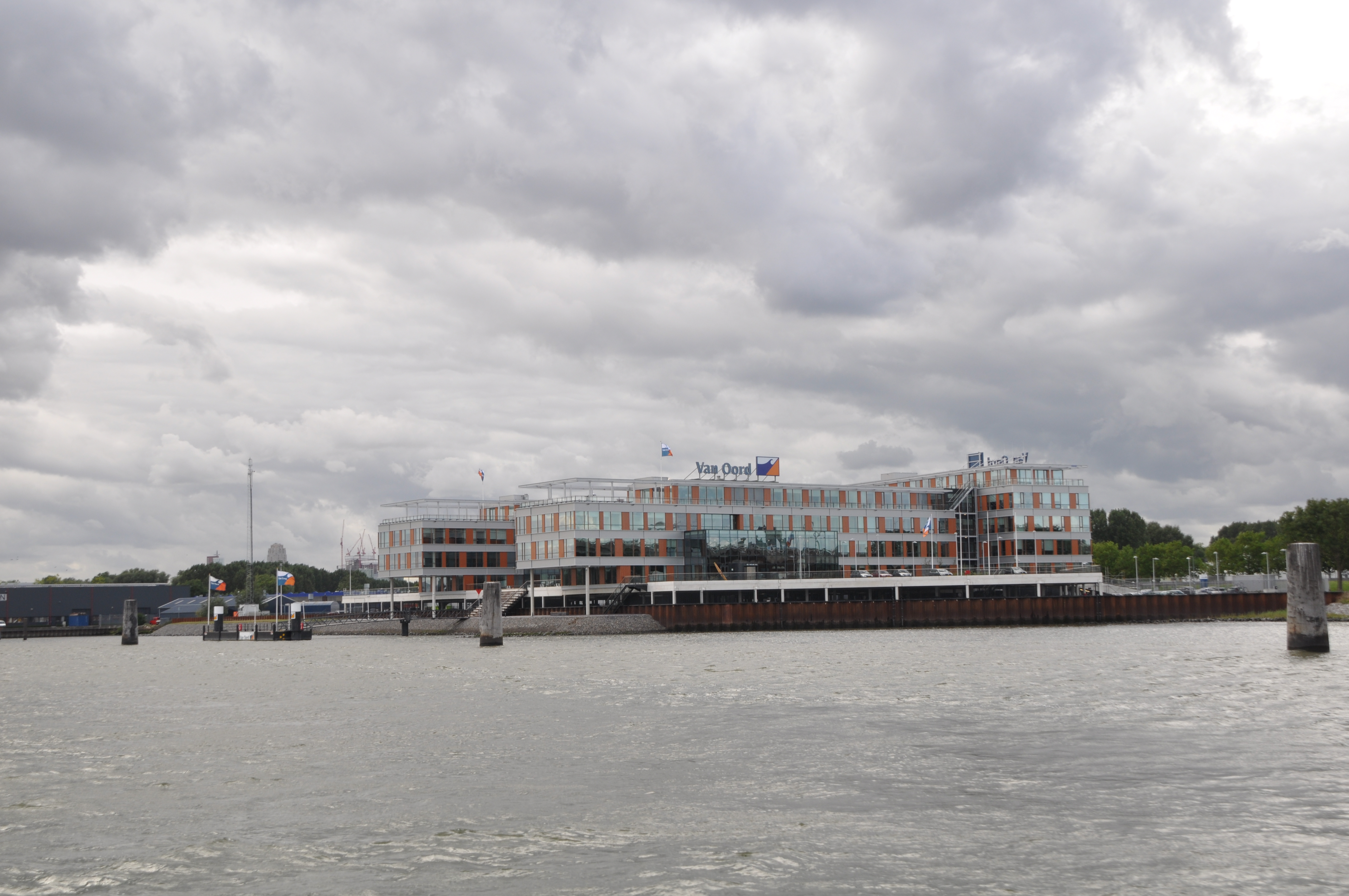
Van Oord head office in Rotterdam

The company was founded by Govert van Oord in 1868. In 1990 it acquired Aannemers Combinatie Zinkwerken ('ACZ') and in 2003 it acquired Ballast HAM Dredging (formed from the merger of Ballast Nedam's dredging division with Hollandse Aanneming Maatschappij ('HAM') two years earlier). King Willem-Alexander of the Netherlands awarded Van Oord the right to use the designation "Koninklijk" (Royal) on 23 November 2018.

== Major projects ==
Projects undertaken by the company include the Oosterscheldekering between Schouwen-Duiveland and Noord-Beveland completed in 1986, the Palm Jumeirah in Dubai completed in 2003, the IJsselmeer pipeline in the Netherlands completed in 2006 and the World in Dubai completed in 2008. A US sales and support office was opened in Houston, Texas in 2010.

In December 2016, the company entered a consortium with partners Shell, Eneco, and Mitsubishi/DGE and was awarded the Borssele III & IV project. It was obtained for the strike price of 54.50 euro cents per megawatt-hour, the Netherlands’ lowest-ever strike price at that time.

In mid-2018, Van Oord announced the acquisition of MPI Offshore from the Vroon Group. MPI Offshore has specialized in offshore wind installations since 2003 as a contractor. Van Oord also takes over the two ships and crew. The transaction is subject to antitrust clearance, but is expected to close by the end of September 2018. Van Oord is mainly strengthening its position in the British offshore wind energy market.

== Offices ==
Offices	Country	Area
Van Oord Dredging and Marine Contractors	Azerbaijan	Europe
Van Oord UK Ltd	England	Europe
Mackley	England	Europe
Sodranord SARL	France	Europe
Van Oord Deutschland GmbH	Germany	Europe
Van Oord Offshore Wind Germany GmbH	Germany	Europe
Van Oord (Gibraltar) Ltd	Gibraltar	Europe
Dravo S.A. - Italia	Italy	Europe
Caspian Dredging and Marine Contractors LLP	Kazakhstan	Europe
Van Oord Dredging and Marine Contractors	Romania	Europe
Van Oord Dredging and Marine Contractors - OOO Ballast Ham Dredging	Russia	Europe
Dravo S.A. - Spain	Spain	Europe
Van Oord Dredging and Marine Contractors	Turkmenistan	Europe
Van Oord Ukraine	Ukraine	Europe
Van Oord Dredging and Marine Contractors	Angola	Africa
Van Oord Nigeria Ltd	Nigeria	Africa
Van Oord Dredging and Marine Contractors	Argentina	Americas
Van Oord Serviços de Operações Marítimas Ltda.	Brazil	Americas
Van Oord Dredging and Marine Contractors BV	Colombia	Americas
Van Oord de México, S.A. de CV.	Mexico	Americas
Van Oord Panama S.A.	Panama	Americas
Van Oord Dredging and Marine Contractors BV	Peru	Americas
Van Oord Offshore USA	United States	Americas
Van Oord Australia Pty Ltd	Australia	Australia
Van Oord (Shanghai) Dredging Co., Ltd	China	Asia
Van Oord Dredging and Marine Contractors bv	Hongkong	Asia
Van Oord India Private Limited	India	Asia
PT Van Oord Indonesia	Indonesia	Asia
Van Oord Dredging and Marine Contractors bv	Korea	Asia
Van Oord (Malaysia) Sdn Bhd	Malaysia	Asia
Van Oord Dredging and Marine Contractors bv	Philippines	Asia
Van Oord Singapore	Singapore	Asia
Van Oord Middle East Limited	Saudi Arabia	Middle East
Van Oord Gulf FZE	United Arab Emirates	Middle East
Van Oord Middle East Limited - Abu Dhabi Branch	United Arab Emirates	Middle East
Van Oord Middle East Limited - Dubai Branch	United Arab Emirates	Middle East
Van Oord RMC FZE	United Arab Emirates	Middle East
Van Oord Nederland bv	Netherlands	Netherlands
Van Oord Offshore bv	Netherlands	Netherlands
Van Oord Offshore Wind bv	Netherlands	Netherlands
Van Oord Grondstoffen	Netherlands	Netherlands
Paans Van Oord bv	Netherlands	Netherlands
Wicks bv	Netherlands	Netherlands
Wicks bv – Operations / Workshop	Netherlands	Netherlands
Yard Moerdijk	Netherlands	Netherlands
Yard Zuilichem	Netherlands	Netherlands
