= Economic and financial standing =

Economic and financial standing refers to a business organisation's scale, financial resources and insurance, especially when these are assessed by a public body when determining whether the business may be considered as a potential supplier.

Under European Union public procurement law, public contracting authorities are permitted to take account of a business's suitability as a potential supplier, before inviting or evaluating tenders in order to assess the best candidate to whom to award a contract. After eliminating any potential suppliers who are in breach of specified legislation, authorities may only treat certain businesses as inappropriate to consider for the award of a specific contract with a value above certain thresholds by reference to their:

- suitability to pursue a professional activity;
- economic and financial standing; or
- technical and professional ability.

In law, economic and financial standing may be ascertained by reference to a company's annual turnover measured against a relevant minimum amount, financial ratios such as the ratio of their assets to liabilities, and their level of professional risk indemnity insurance. In accordance with a new requirement introduced into the 2014 Directive, the minimum yearly turnover that economic operators are required to have may not exceed twice the estimated contract value unless there are specific circumstances which justify a higher level. This turnover cap has been introduced 'to facilitate SME (small and medium enterprise) participation'

Article 47 of the previous directive on public procurement (2004), also entitled "Economic and financial standing", provided that proof of the economic operator's economic and financial standing could, as a general rule, be furnished by one or more of the following references:

(a) appropriate statements from banks or, where appropriate, evidence of relevant professional risk indemnity insurance;

(b) the presentation of balance-sheets or extracts from the balance-sheets, where publication of the balance-sheet is required under the law of the country in which the economic operator is established;

(c) a statement of the undertaking’s overall turnover and, where appropriate, of turnover in the area covered by the contract for a maximum of the last three financial years available, depending on the date on which the undertaking was set up or the economic operator started trading, as far as the information on these turnovers is available.

== Case law ==
Court cases where contractors' economic and financial standing has been an issue raised in proceedings include:

- Ballast Nedam Groep NV v Belgian State, Court of Justice of the European Communities, judgment issued on 14 April 1994
- Harmon CFEM Facades (UK) Ltd. v. The Corporate Officer of the House of Commons [1999], Technology and Construction Court (EWHC 199) (28 October 1999)
- Észak-dunántúli Környezetvédelmi és Vízügyi Igazgatóság (Édukövízig) and Hochtief Construction AG Magyarországi Fióktelepe (now Hochtief Solutions AG Magyarországi Fióktelepe) v. Közbeszerzések Tanácsa Közbeszerzési Döntőbizottság, Court of Justice of the European Communities, judgment issued on 11 October 2012.
