= Jan Agema =

Dutch hydraulic engineer and professor

Jan Fokke Agema
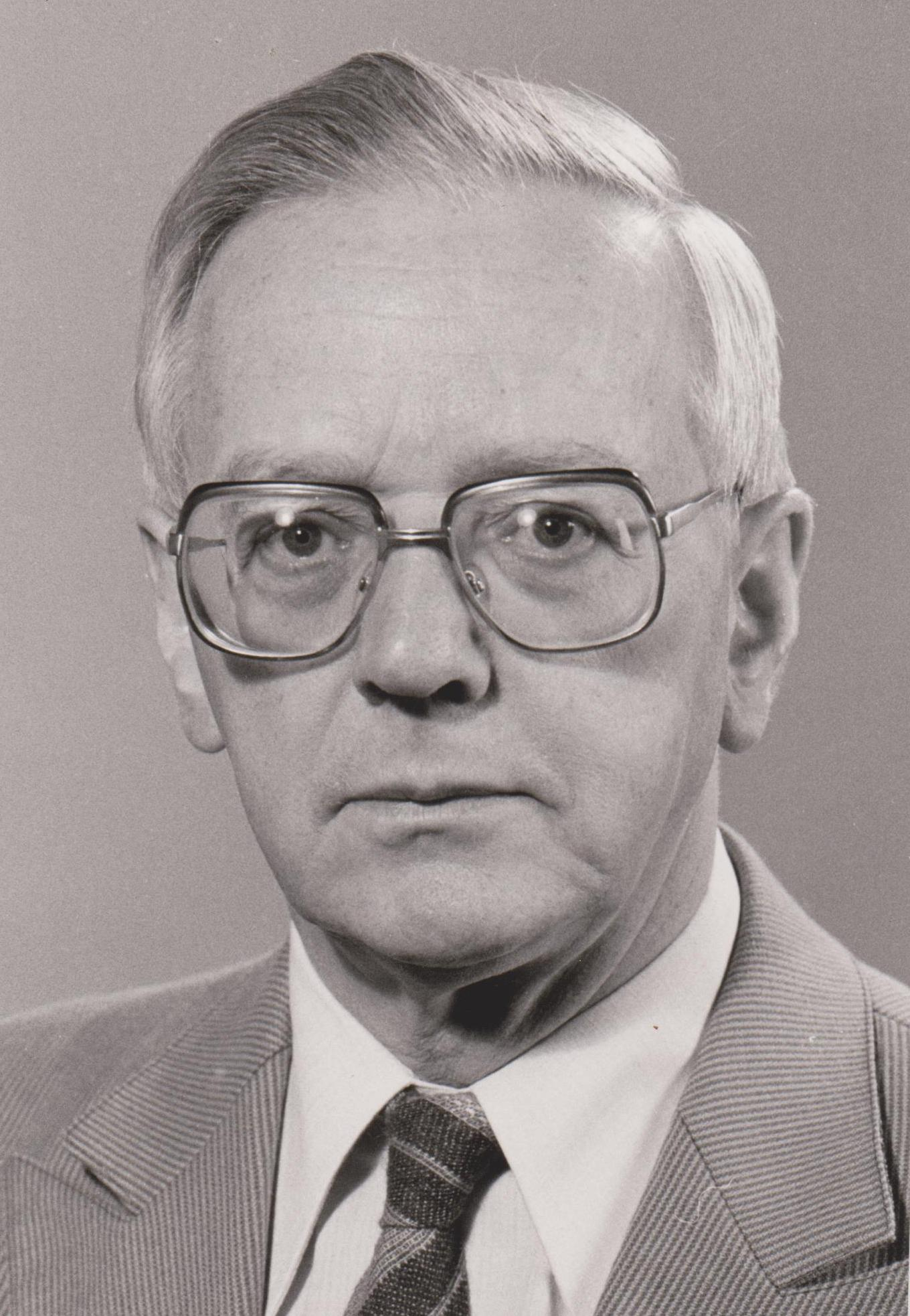
- Prof. dr. ir. J.F. Agema, c. 1970
- Born: 12 September 1919; Opmeer
- Died: 23 April 2011 (aged 91); Zeist
- Citizenship: Netherlands
- Education: Delft University of Technology
- Employers: Rijkswaterstaat; Delft University of Technology
- Known for: prof. dr.ir. J.F. Agemaprijs (English: The Professor ir. J.F. Agema Prize)
- Notable work: Hoek van Holland harbour entrance The Delta Works; The Jamuna Bridge in Bangladesh
- Awards: Order of the Dutch Lion 1977
- Scientific career
- Fields: Civil Engineering; Hydraulic Engineering
- Academic advisors: Professor Eco Bijker

Jan Fokke Agema (12 September 1919 – 23 April 2011) was a Dutch hydraulic engineer and professor at Delft University of Technology. He is notable for his design of the harbour entrance at Hoek van Holland and involvement in the construction of the Oosterscheldekering. The prof. dr.ir. J.F. Agemaprijs (English: the Professor ir. J.F. Agema Prize) is named for him, and has been awarded every five years since 2000.

== Family, early life and education ==
Agema was born in Opmeer in 1919, the eldest of three brothers in a working class family. His father, Sibbele Agema, was born in Wirdum, and met his mother, Johanna Catharina Agema (née van Dolder), when he was billeted in her family's farmhouse in Gouwsluis, near Alphen aan den Rijn whilst he was mobilised with the Royal Netherlands Army during World War I.

In 1932, Agema attended the vocational school in Hoorn, choosing to study carpentry. At this school, he also studied technical drawing, statics, projective geometry, mathematics, and materials science, graduating in 1935.

Agema displayed exemplary academic performance at the school, and in 1935 the school board chairman Johan van der Burgt, who had an additional role as the head of the Hoorn district of Rijkswaterstaat, arranged for the then 15-year-old Agema to commence as a trainee draftsman at the Hoorn district service. During summer breaks, he was involved in Rijkswaterstaat's measurement and morphological studies in the Wadden Sea and the coastlines of the Wadden Islands.

In 1938, Agema was transferred as an assistant draftsman to Johan van Veen at the Rijkswaterstaat Lower Rivers study service in The Hague, living in a boarding house in Scheveningen. He spent the money that remained after paying rent on evening class lessons in mathematics, hydraulic engineering, and other subjects in preparation for the Rijkswaterstaat Technisch Ambtenaar (English: Technical Official) exams.

== Activities during World War II ==
In 1940, Agema was mobilised with the Netherlands Armed Forces and stationed in Schoonhoven with the Pontonniers (English: pontoon engineers). Following the German bombing of Rotterdam in May 1940, he moved to Grave, where his company were ambushed by German troops in the early morning of 10 May 1940.

I must have seen the city smoking after that dreadful bombardment, but I don't remember any image of it. Perhaps the devastated city of Rotterdam made such an overwhelming impression on me that I locked everything away. I only know that we had to lay down our weapons, became prisoners of war, and returned to our base in Schoonhoven. We were released there at the beginning of June and were demobilised.

— Jan Fokke Agema, "Jan Fokke Agema (pp. 9 -42)", Building from the ground up: The life of a Civil Engineer (1999)

By June 1940, he had managed to resume his work at Rijkswaterstaat, avoiding Arbeitseinsatz as a result of the organisation convincing the Germans that all their employees were essential to prevent The Netherlands from flooding. In early 1941, he earned a diploma as Waterbouwkundig Opzichter Zeeland (English: Zeeland Hydraulic Engineering Overseer), and in April 1941 he was transferred to Bergen op Zoom as a 3rd class overseer at the harbour works office, where he earned a PBNA Concrete Technician diploma.

In 1942, he was transferred back to Hoorn, but in April 1943, the Wehrmacht commander in the Netherlands announced that all members of the former Dutch army had to report to be taken back into captivity as prisoners of war. Agema was one of the thousands of ex-soldiers who ignored this order, going into hiding at a farm near his parents' house in Opmeer, where he was given shelter and food in exchange for doing odd jobs.

However, it was arranged that he would occasionally receive documents from Rijkswaterstaat by courier, so that he could continue his calculations. During this time, he managed to sit the Technical Official of Rijkswaterstaat exam whilst still in hiding. This resulted in his promotion to Technical Officer in permanent service in 1946.

== Post-War period ==
In February 1947, he was transferred by Rijkswaterstaat to Roermond. On 1 November 1948, he was again transferred, this time to the service in Vlissingen under the supervision of ir. H.A. Ferguson. Following the North Sea flood of 1953 he was tasked with sealing a number of breaches in dikes and flood defences. He was able to make the first assessment of the damage and the initial restoration plan by helicopter, and as part of the recovery operations, he led the works to close breaches at Hansweert and Kruiningen.

== Works for Rijkswaterstaat, the Delta Works and continuing academic education ==
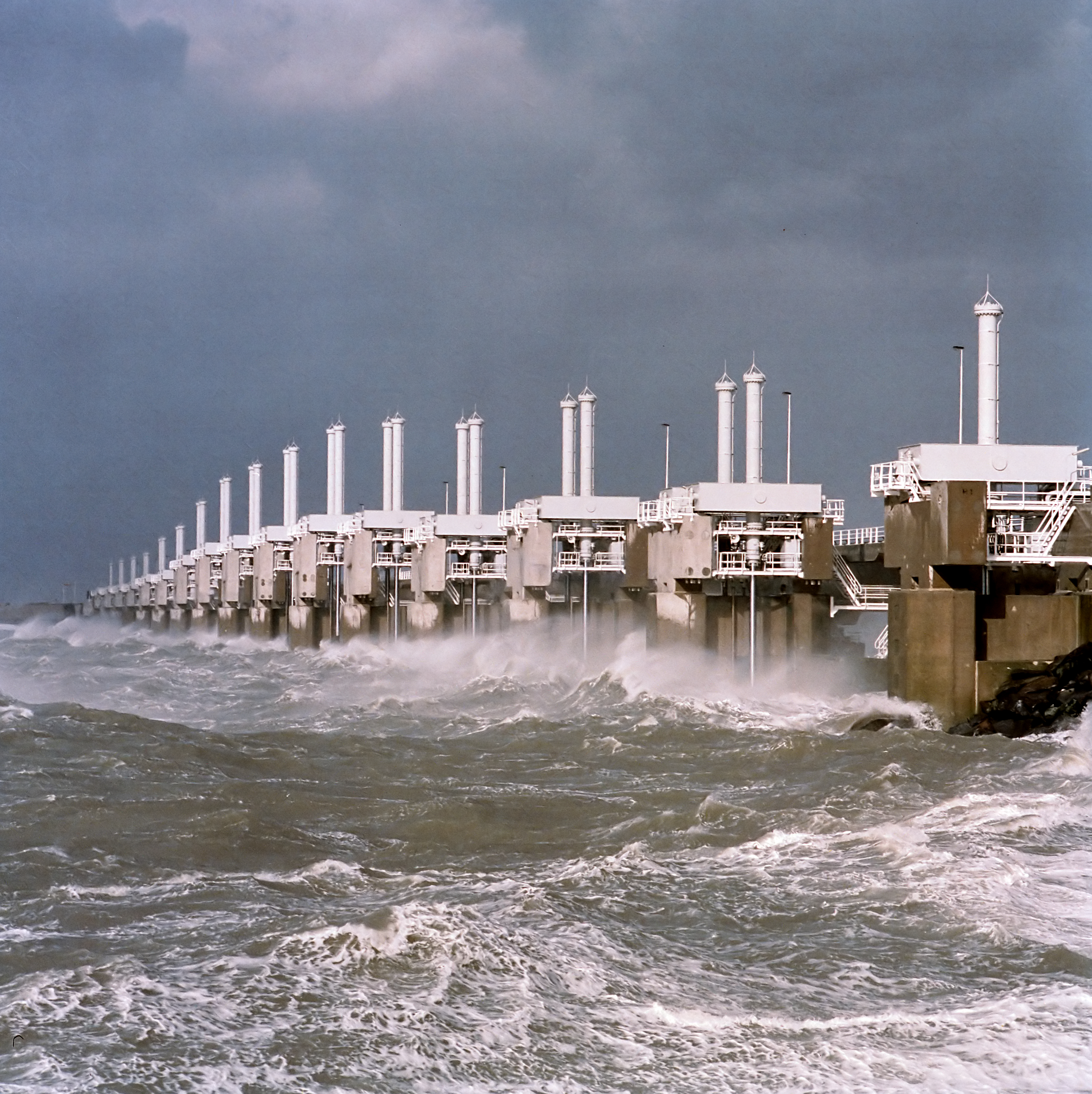
The Oosterscheldekering during a storm

On 1 July 1957, Agema was transferred to the Rijkswaterstaat office in The Hague as a hydraulic engineering senior official. In 1959, he decided to enrol as a working student of hydraulic engineering at Delft University of Technology, being accepted on the course due to the fact that the Rijkswaterstaat Technical Officer diploma was equivalent to a Hogere technische school (English: Higher Technical School) diploma.

From 1960, Agema was employed in the Rotterdam district, where he was assigned the responsibility of designing a new harbour mouth for Hoek van Holland. His place of work shifted to Hoek van Holland in 1966, where under the guidance of engineer Jacobus 'Co' van Dixhoorn, he contributed to the construction of new harbour dams.

Agema's combination of study whilst working full-time for Rijkswaterstaat meant that he did not graduate until 1970, when he was fifty years of age, and therefore older than his graduation professor, Eco Bijker. He was subsequently promoted to Chief Engineer at Rijkswaterstaat.

=== The Oosterscheldekering ===
In 1973, Agema took on the role of Principal Engineer at the Rijkswaterstaat Delta Service, leading the hydrological department. Initially, his assignment was to work on the closure of the Oosterschelde (English: Eastern Scheldt) with a dam. The dam, known as the Oosterscheldekering (English: Eastern Scheldt storm surge barrier), had originally been designed as a fully closed structure.

Following public protests from environmental campaigners and fisheries groups, the Den Uyl cabinet decided in 1974 to make significant changes to the project and the requirements were changed to mandate a partially open dam. There was no precedent for such a structure anywhere in the world, and therefore no design codes to follow or construction experience from which to draw ideas.

By 1976, the requirements for the design and execution of the works were fully established, creating a formidable challenge for Agema's hydrological department, which included the development of mathematical models for water movement, among other tasks. The Oosterscheldekering was successfully completed in 1986.

== Academic career at Delft University of Technology and later works ==
From 1972, Agema served as a part-time lecturer at Delft University of Technology. In September 1979, he was appointed full professor of Hydraulic Engineering. He was a strong advocate of quality assurance, and was particularly concerned with improving civil engineering execution processes to ensure the completed work met design specifications, extending the scope of quality assurance into operational management and maintenance of constructed projects.

Agema also strongly promoted the use of probabilistic methods in design, and encouraged Professor Han Vrijling, Professor in Probabilistic Design and Hydraulic Structures at Delft, to develop this into a major part of the chair. His work with Vrijling in this period included the development of probabilistic methods for analysis of the failure risk of armour layers in breakwaters. He retired from the university in October 1985, and joined Ballast Nedam as a consultant until 1990, when he became an independent consultant. In 1992, Delft University of Technology awarded him an honorary doctorate.

== The Agema Prize ==
In 2000, the Dutch Koninklijk Instituut van Ingenieurs (English: Royal Institute of Engineers) established the prof. dr.ir. J.F. Agemaprijs (English: Professor Dr. J.F. Agema Prize) to recognise innovative hydraulic engineering projects completed within the preceding five years. This award is made to the entire project team of client, designer and contractor. From the entries, five projects are nominated, from which a jury ultimately chooses the winner.

The following are the award winners since inception:

- 2000: The construction of the Bangabandhu Bridge (awarded in 2001)
- 2005: The Balgstuw inflatable dam at Ramspol, in Overijssel
- 2010: The Busan–Geoje Fixed Link
- 2015: Maasvlakte 2. The book "Building the Delta" provides an overview of all nominated projects from 2015.
- 2020: The Marker Wadden. This award was presented at the Dutch Waterbouwdag (Hydraulic Engineering Day) in 2021 as a result of the COVID-19 pandemic.
- 2025: The Borselle Wind Energy Project. 2nd prize: Afsluitdijk Dike Reinforcement project.

== International work ==
Agema was involved in works in Bangladesh, including the closure of the Feni River in 1986, and served on the panel to assess a river crossing over the Jamuna River in 1985, as an adviser to the World Bank. He was then responsible for the implementation of the hydraulic engineering elements of the project, which accounted for approximately 50% of the total costs. In addition, he was involved in the design of the MOSE storm surge barrier in Venice, and the Cardiff Bay Barrage, where he served as the adviser to the design team for the closure and embankment works.

== Personal life ==
Agema married Lien Koot from Rotterdam in 1960. The couple moved to Hoek van Holland after their wedding and had three children. In 1977, he was appointed officer in the Order of the Dutch Lion, in recognition of his works as Chief Engineer for special services at Rijkswaterstaat. In 1979, Agema and his family moved to 's-Gravenzande before settling in Zeist in 2010, where Agema died in 2011, at the age of 91.

== See also ==
- Flood control in the Netherlands
- Delta Works
- Rijkswaterstaat
- Oosterscheldekering
