= Jo Johannis Dronkers =

Dutch mathematician

dr. Jo Johannis Dronkers
- Born: 24 May 1910; Poortvliet, Zeeland, The Netherlands
- Died: 20 February 1973 (aged 62); The Hague, The Netherlands
- Education: Leiden University
- Known for: Theory of tides Delta Works
- Awards: Order of Orange-Nassau; Conrad medal of the Koninklijk Instituut van Ingenieurs (Netherlands Royal Institute of Engineers)
- Scientific career
- Fields: Mathematics; Hydraulic engineering
- Workplaces: Rijkswaterstaat
- Thesis: Over stratifieerbare congruenties (On stratifiable congruencies) (1939)
- Academic advisors: Willem van der Woude

Jo Johannis Dronkers (24 May 1910 – 20 February 1973) was a Dutch mathematician who is notable for the development of mathematical methods for the calculation of tides and tidal currents in estuaries. His work formed much of the mathematical basis for the design of the Delta Works. He attended the 1954 International Congress of Mathematicians in Amsterdam, where his work was discussed by David van Dantzig.

== Life and career ==
=== Education and early work ===
Jo Johannis Dronkers was born in Poortvliet, the son of Willem Dronkers, a mayor, and Cornelia Pieternella van der Slikke. He had a twin brother, Johannis Jo Dronkers (1910-1993). He attended the State High School in Bergen op Zoom and then studied mathematics and physics at Leiden University. He completed his dissertation entitled "On stratifiable congruences" in 1939 under the supervision of Professor Willem van der Woude.

Although his work dealt with a problem in pure mathematics, it was notable for containing eleven propositions, five of which concerned tides. Three of these five propositions contained fundamental criticism of the work of Jannis Pieter Mazure, who at that time was one of the most influential people in the field of tidal calculations in the Netherlands. Amongst other propositions, Dronkers proposed a solution to the problem caused by the influence of upstream discharge on the calculation of tidal motion in downstream rivers.

Another of Dronkers' propositions concerned an inaccuracy in the work of Hendrik Lorentz contained in Lorentz's report on tidal movements as a consequence of the Zuiderzee Works.

=== Rijkswaterstaat and the Delta Works ===
In 1934, Dronkers commenced his career at Rijkswaterstaat, a Dutch governmental agency responsible for water management and civil engineering works. He was assigned to the Sea Arms, Lower Rivers and Coasts service, a division directed by Dr. Johan van Veen, where Dronkers focused on the mathematical study of tides and related hydrodynamic phenomena. His expertise contributed significantly to the post-war restoration efforts associated with the aftermath of the Inundation of Walcheren in 1945. Dronkers' role during this period is vividly described in A. den Doolaard's non-fiction novel Het verjaagde water, in which he is described as "The Calculator."

Dronkers' collaborative work with notable engineers like Frank Spaargaren led to several key publications in hydraulic engineering, particularly on topics such as tidal basin closures. His work gained further prominence following the devastating North Sea Flood of 1953, as he became deeply involved in the Delta Works project, a series of major civil engineering projects built to protect the Netherlands from sea flooding. Between 1949 and 1963, Dronkers served at the Central Study Service of RIjkswaterstaat, later renamed the Directorate for Water Management and Water Movement, under the leadership of Ir. J.B. Schijf. Here, as the chief mathematician, he played an integral role in the early studies that shaped the Delta Plan.

In 1963, Dronkers took over as head of the hydrological department of the Delta Service, succeeding H.A. Ferguson. His mathematical acumen was crucial in devising tidal calculations for the Delta Works. The earlier Delta Commission Report of 1961, to which Dronkers contributed, focused extensively on storm surges and tidal motion, and included work by other notable Dutch engineers like Pieter Jacobus Wemelsfelder. Dronkers' work was pivotal in transitioning from empirical approaches to more scientifically robust computational methodologies in hydraulic engineering. His analytical techniques allowed for a proactive assessment of hydraulic interventions, thereby laying the groundwork for evidence-based strategic planning in the field. This approach continues to influence much of hydraulic engineering.

Dronkers published his magnum opus, Tidal computations in rivers and coastal waters, in 1964. It remains a benchmark in the field of tidal calculation theory, and led to the award of the Conrad Medal by the Royal Netherlands Institute of Engineers to Dronkers in 1965. However, the book’s reception was not without controversy in the hydraulic engineering community. Dronkers' computational approach, though rigorous, was criticized by Johan van Veen for its complexity and computational demands, which he believed could hinder timely practical applications. Instead, van Veen proposed the use of an electrical analogue, which led to the use of the Deltar analogue computer. Conversely, the notable Dutch civil engineer Johannes Theodoor Thijsse advocated for a physical model-based approach.

== Bibliography ==
- Dronkers, J.J. (1975). "Tidal Theory and Computations". Advances in Hydroscience. 10: 145–230. Archived from the original on 17 June 2023.
- Dronkers, Jo Johannis (1939). Over stratifieerbare congruenties [On Stratifiable Congruences] (in Dutch). Amsterdam: H.J. Paris. p. 76.
- Dronkers, J.J. (1964). Tidal Computations in Rivers and Coastal Waters. North Holland Publishing Company.
- Dronkers, J.J.; Schönfeld, J.C.; Waalewijn, A. (1959). Tidal Computations in Shallow Water - Report on Hydrostatic Levelling across the Westerschelde (Rijkswaterstaat Communications 01 ed.). Rijkswaterstaat.
- Dronkers, J.J.; Breusers, H.N.C.; Vinjé, J.J.; Venis, W.A.; Spaargaren, F. (1968). "Closure of Estuarine Channels in Tidal Regions". De Ingenieur.

A list of many of Dronkers' reports is available at the website of the Trésor der Hollandse Waterbouw.
