= 2023 Jersey tornado =

T6 (IF3) tornado in the United Kingdom

Meteorological history
- Date: November 1, 2023
- Duration: 14 minutes

IF3 tornado
- on the International Fujita scale

T6 tornado
- on the TORRO scale

Overall effects
- Fatalities: 0
- Injuries: 3
- Areas affected: Jersey, Channel Islands
- Part of the tornadoes of 2023

Just before midnight on Wednesday, November 1, 2023, a tornado impacted the Isle of Jersey in the Channel Islands, a crown dependency of the United Kingdom. Associated with powerful extratropical cyclone Storm Ciarán, the tornado was subsequently rated T6 on the TORRO scale or IF3 on the International Fujita scale, which is broadly analogous to the Enhanced Fujita scale commonly used in the United States, making it the strongest tornado to hit the British Isles since the Birmingham Tornado in 2005.

== Meteorological synopsis ==
The tornado was associated with a broader storm system, Storm Ciarán, an extremely powerful extratropical cyclone named by the UK's Met Office on the October 29, 2023. Red weather warnings for non-tornadic wind gusts in excess of 100 mph were already in force for the Channel Islands with schools closed and people told to stay at home. By 18:00 GMT, the leading edge of the storm's precipitation in the form of a warm front had reached Jersey, bringing mainly heavy rain produced by nimbostratus clouds.

At around 22:00 GMT, a cluster of showers formed over western Brittany in response to the storm's rapidly advancing cold front, which then intensified into a cluster of thunderstorms. The cluster was quickly advected northeast back into the storm's warm sector by the extremely strong south-westerly winds where it evolved into a persistent and severe single-cell thunderstorm known as a supercell. This cell left the northern coast of France near Saint-Brieuc, and reanalysis of detected lightning strikes produced by the cell shows that at least three cloud-to-ground strikes with a positive charge and a current exceeding 100kA affected mainland France and the English Channel as the storm tracked northeast towards Jersey.

Thunder and lightning was initially reported in St Helier by 23:40 GMT, and by 23:50 GMT, very large hail up to 85 mm (3.3 in) in diameter was reported in the northern and Western suburbs of St Helier as well as scattered reports having been received in the more rural north-eastern parishes, which is comparable to some of the largest hail ever recorded in the British Isles since at least 1950. At around 23:55 GMT, the tornado touched down just to the east of Havre des Pas bathing pool, on the island's south-south-eastern coastline, inflicting moderate-to-severe damage to coastal and seafront properties.

A classic hook echo was present on the island's Doppler radar that indicated tornadic rotation to the east of the forward-flank downdraft.

== Tornado summary ==
The tornado developed as it approached the island from the South, making landfall at St Clement. At this point, the tornado was around 550 m in width. The tornado then continued to travel north-north-east, inflicting severe damage to Florence Boot Playing Fields, where metal fence posts were bent and deformed with other metal structures being torn and twisted. A metal recycling bank was rolled into a car before being tossed into the road 40 m from where it originally stood. This damage was rated T4 and T5, respectively. A sports center sustained severe damage as the roof was torn off, and wooden beams from the building were lofted over 150 m. This damage was rated T6.

The tornado continued north/north-eastward, inflicting further damage to an industrial estate at T5 intensity, displacing sheet metal debris over 1 km away. Continuing into Le Boulivot, more T6 damage was inflicted upon several properties, one of which suffered structural collapse and a car was displaced by 25 metres.

Further T5+ damage was found at a farmhouse and barn along Rue St Julien, with severe roof damage noted. Strong tornado damage continued into Beuvelande Campsite where several caravans were completely destroyed.

In Fliquet, several homes had their roofs completely removed at T5 intensity, with debris being lofted and embedded into other structures, warranting a T6 rating. The tornado continued snapping trees as it approached the coastline, finally exiting the island at Fliquet.
