= Oosterscheldekering =

Dutch storm surge barrier in the North Sea

Coordinates: 51°38′01″N 3°42′16″E

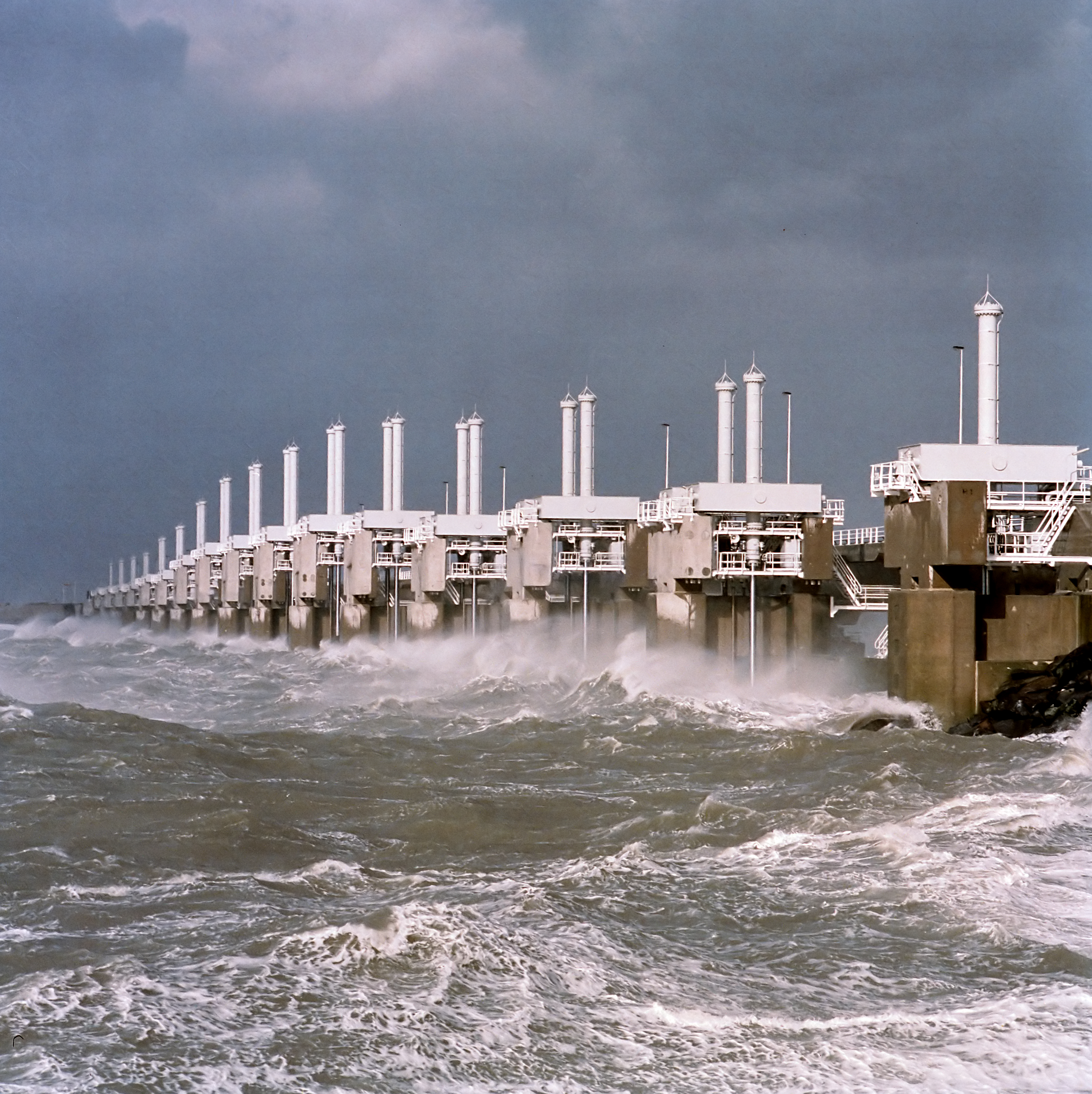
One of the three movable barrier sections of the Oosterscheldekering during a storm

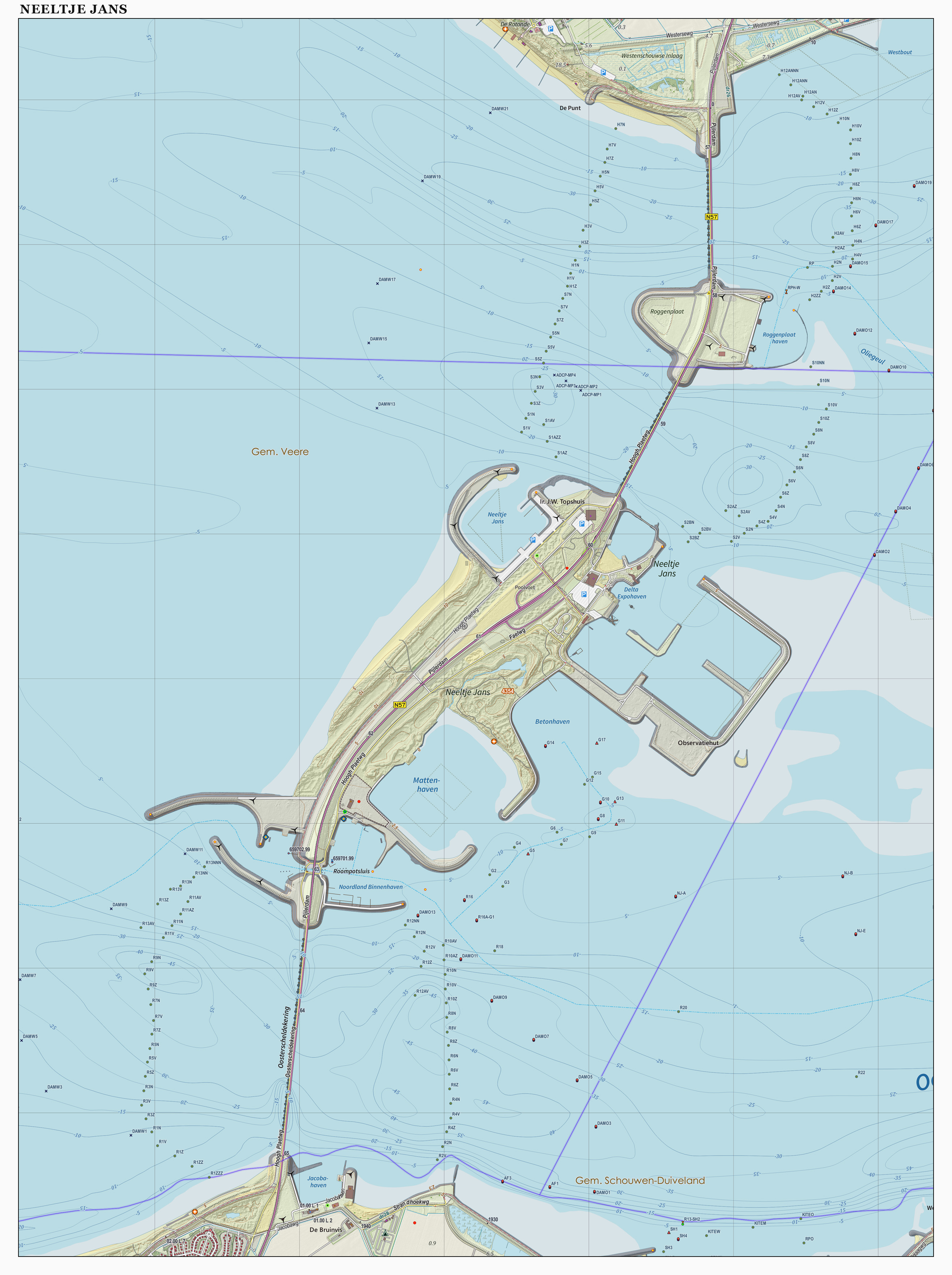
Topographical map of the Oosterscheldedam. Alternatingly it consists of five sections: three movable flood barriers and two artificial islands.

The Oosterscheldekering (pronounced [oːstərˌsxɛldəˈkeːrɪŋ] English: Eastern Scheldt barrier), between the islands Schouwen-Duiveland and Noord-Beveland, is the largest of the Delta Works, a series of dams and storm surge barriers designed to protect the Netherlands from flooding from the North Sea. The construction of the Delta Works was a response to the widespread damage and loss of life in the North Sea flood of 1953.

== Surge barrier ==
The second longest dam in the Delta Works, after the 10.5-kilometre-long Oesterdam, the nine-kilometre-long Oosterscheldekering (kering meaning barrier) was initially designed, and partly built, as a closed dam, but after public protests, huge sluice-gate-type doors were installed in the remaining four kilometres. These doors are normally open, but can be closed under adverse weather conditions. In this way, the saltwater marine life behind the dam is preserved and fishing can continue, while the land behind the dam is safe from the water. Notable figures involved in the design of the Oosterscheldekering included Jan Agema, and from 1976 the design of the project was led by Frank Spaargaren.

On 4 October 1986, Queen Beatrix officially opened the dam for use by saying the well-known words: "De stormvloedkering is gesloten. De Deltawerken zijn voltooid. Zeeland is veilig." (The flood barrier is closed. The Delta Works are completed. Zeeland is safe.)

At the artificial island Neeltje-Jans, at one end of the barrier, a plaque is installed with the words: "Hier gaan over het tij, de maan, de wind en wij" ("Here, ruling of the tide of the sea, is done by the moon, the wind and we").

== Construction ==
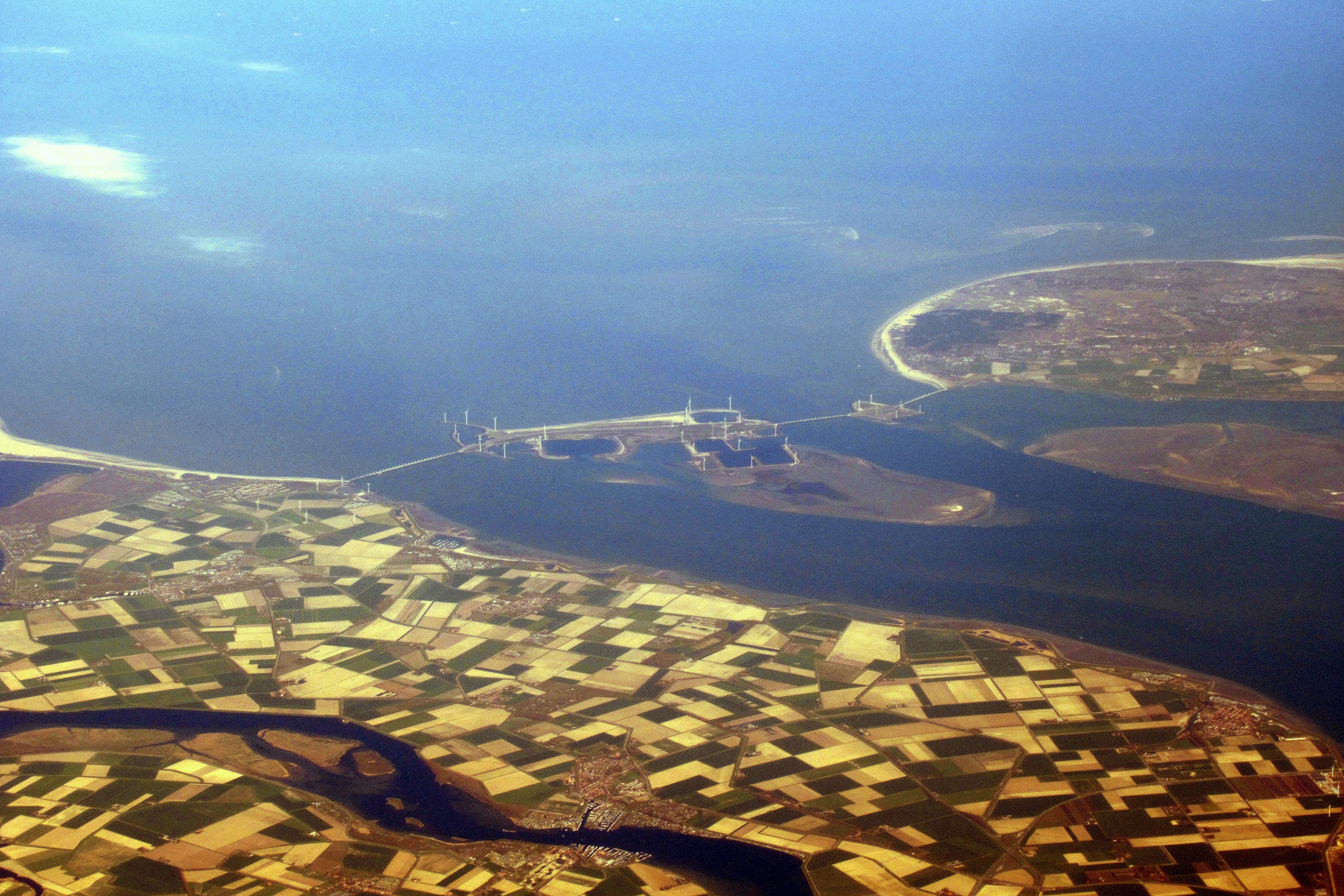
Oosterscheldekering (center)

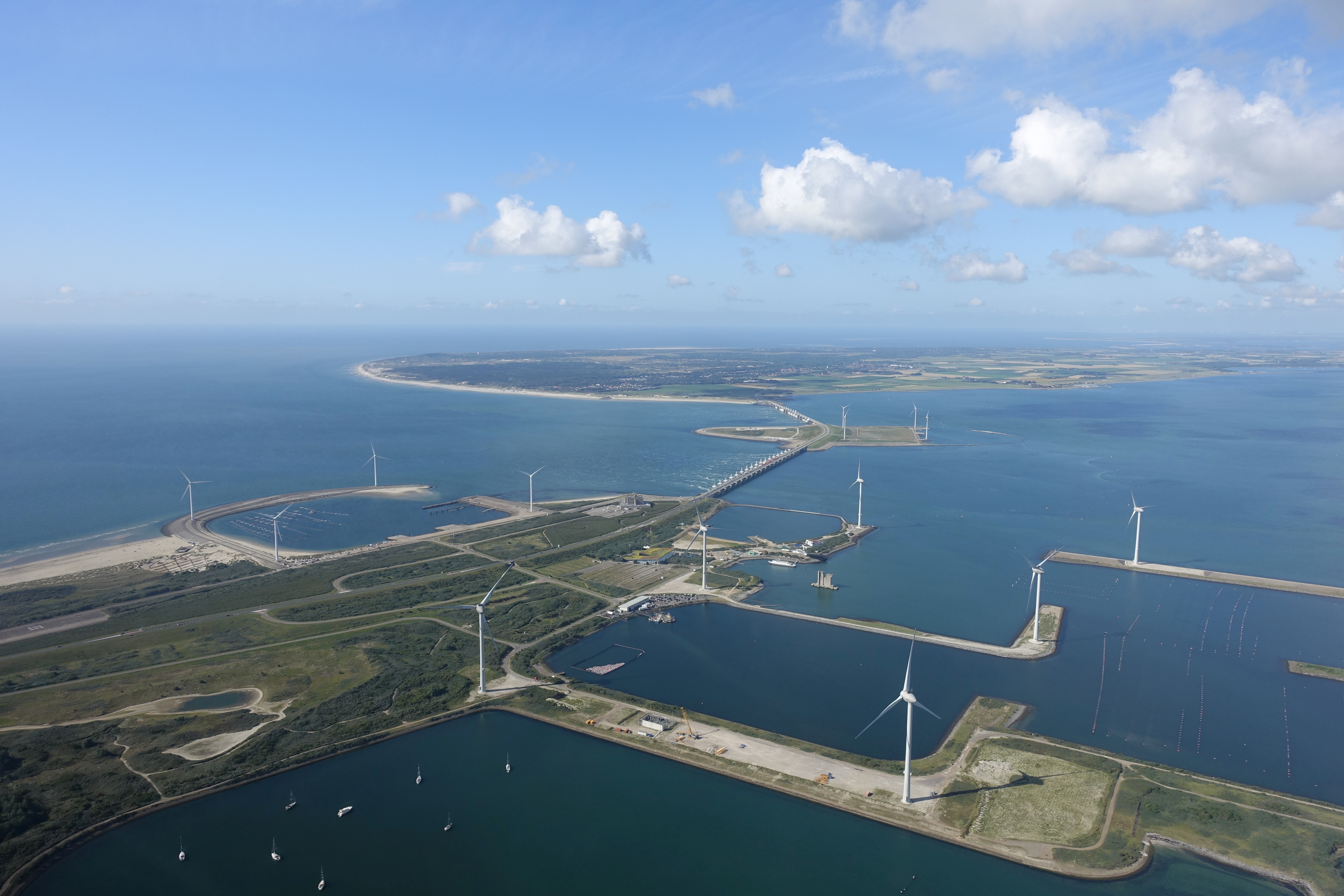
North-eastern section of Oosterscheldekering

The Oosterscheldekering was the most difficult to build and most expensive part of the Delta works. Work on the dam took more than a decade. It was constructed by a consortium of contractors comprising Ballast Nedam, Royal Boskalis, Baggermaatschappij Breejenhout, Hollandse Aanneming Maatschappij, Hollandse Beton Maatschappij, Van Oord-Utrecht, Stevin Baggeren, Stevin Beton en Waterbouw, Adriaan Volker Baggermaatschappij, Adriaan Volker Beton en Waterbouw and Aannemerscombinatie Zinkwerken. Construction started in April 1976 and was completed in June 1986. The road over the dam was ready for use in November 1987.

The road was opened by Princess Juliana of the Netherlands on 5 November 1987, exactly 457 years after the St Felix Day's flood of 1530, which had washed away a large chunk of Zeeland, upstream of the new barrier's position.

To facilitate the building, an artificial island, Neeltje-Jans, was created in the middle of the estuary. When the construction was finished, the island was rebuilt to be used as education centre for visitors and as a base for maintenance works.

The dam is based on 65 concrete pillars with 62 steel doors, each 42 meters wide. The parts were constructed in a dry dock. The area was flooded and a small fleet of special construction ships lifted the pillars and placed them in their final positions. Each pillar is between 35 and 38.75 metres high and weighs 18000 tonnes. The dam is designed to last more than 200 years.

The Oosterscheldekering is sometimes referred to as the eighth Wonder of the World. It has been declared one of the modern Seven Wonders of the World by the American Society of Civil Engineers.

== Construction fleet ==
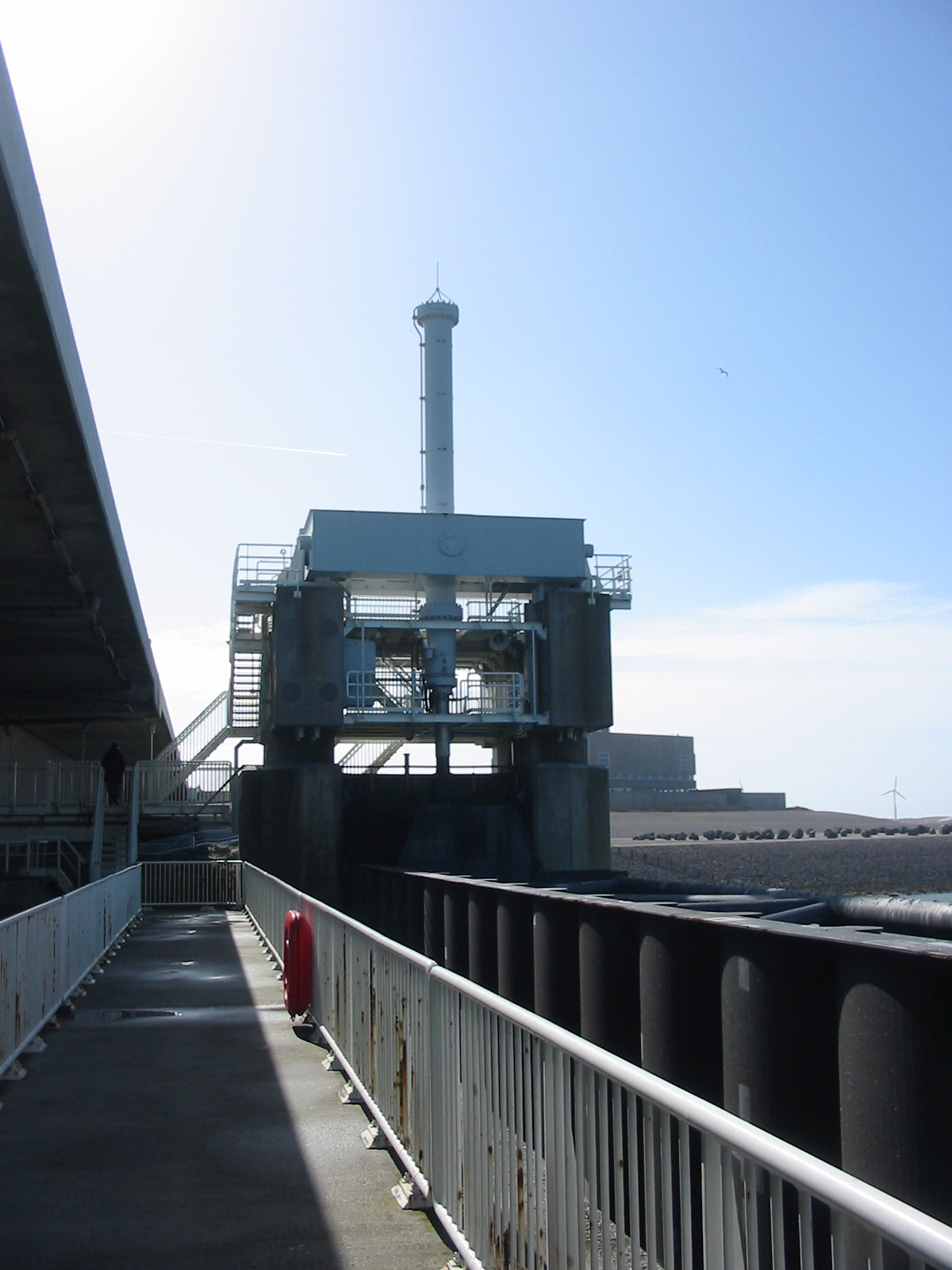
Detailed view of the Oosterscheldekering

Four ships were custom designed and built for this project:

- Mytilus, a ship equipped with various ground working tools, such as needles to make the seabed denser and more stable.
- Cardium, a ship to transport and lay a special foil carpet on the seabed for the pillars to rest on.
- Ostrea, a ship capable of lifting a concrete pillar from the dry dock and placing it accurately on a special foil on the seabed. The ship is 85 metres long and has a portal 50 metres high. The ship can only lift 10,000 tonnes, but as a large part of the pillar is underwater, it is not necessary for the ship to be able to lift the full 18,000 tonnes. This ship is considered the flagship of the construction fleet, mainly because of its larger size and power in comparison to the other ships.
- Macoma, a ship that works closely with the Ostrea, cleaning the foil assisting in placing the pillars accurately in their final position.

The ships are named after various types of shellfish.

== Operation ==
The dam is manually operated but if human control fails, an electronic security system acts as a backup. A Dutch law regulates the conditions under which the dam is allowed to close. The water levels must be at least three meters above regular sea level before the doors can be completely shut. Each sluice gate is closed once a month for testing. Emergency procedures are tested on pre-scheduled dates. Once the test is passed, the shutters are quickly opened again to create a minimum amount of effect on tidal movements and the local marine ecosystem. It takes approximately one hour to close a door. The cost of operation is €17 million per year.

The full dam has been closed twenty-eight times since 1986, due to water levels exceeding or being predicted to exceed three metres. The last time was on January 31 2022, because of Storm Corrie.

== Tidal power generation ==
In 2015, five Tocardo T2 tidal turbines were installed on the barrier, mounted on a 50 m long frame supported by the road bridge, which could rotate to lift all of the turbines out the water simultaneously. The turbines were installed in the eighth sluice channel from the southern end of the barrier, and started generating electricity to the Dutch grid in 2016. The installation was reported to have cost around US$12.4 million, and was the largest tidal power project in the Netherlands. Each turbine was 5.26 m in diameter (87 m² swept area) and rated at 250 kW for a total power of 1.25 MW. The project was decommissioned after eight years of operation in 2023.

== See also ==
- Flood control in the Netherlands
- Delta Works
- Rijkswaterstaat
- Jan Agema
- Frank Spaargaren
- Dutch Headwind Cycling Championships, which take place on the Oosterscheldekering
