= Eco Bijker =

Dutch civil engineer

Eco Wiebe Bijker
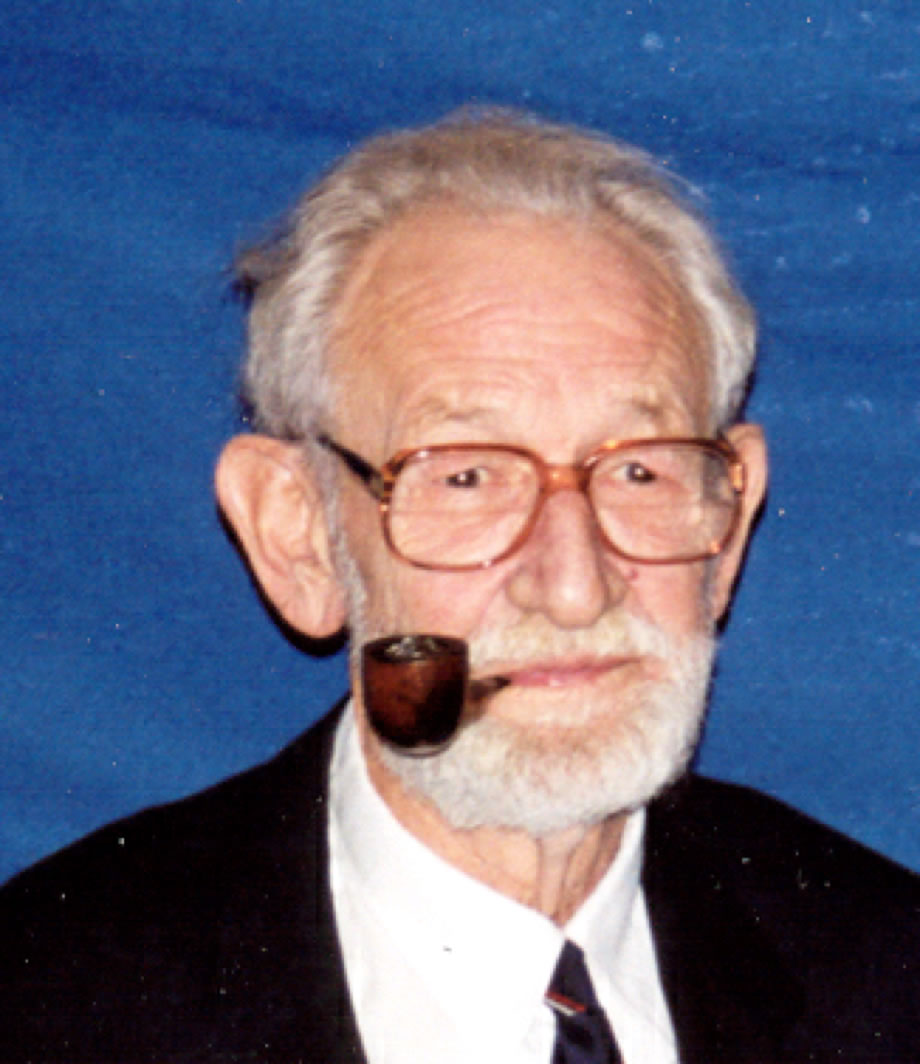
- Born: Utrecht, Netherlands
- Died: February 27, 2012 (aged 87); Bilthoven, Netherlands
- Education: Delft University of Technology
- Occupations: Professor in Coastal Engineering at Delft University of Technology; Editor-in-Chief of Coastal Engineering Journal
- Known for: Foundation of the Coastal Engineering Journal; Equation for wave-driven longitudinal sediment transport on sandy coasts
- Awards: ASCE International Coastal Engineering Award (1986); Order of the Dannebrog
- Scientific career
- Thesis: Some considerations about scales for coastal models with movable bed (1967)
- Doctoral advisor: H.J. Schoemaker
- Notable students: Jan Agema

Eco Wiebe Bijker (29 June 1924 – 27 February 2012) was a Dutch civil engineer and Professor of coastal engineering at Delft University of Technology from 1968 until his retirement in 1989. His research focused on coastal morphology, sediment transport, and the modelling of coastal dynamics. Bijker is particularly known for formulating a sediment transport model which quantifies the combined effects of waves and currents on sediment movement and remains widely applied in coastal engineering practice. Through his research and work at the Waterloopkundig Laboratorium, Bijker contributed to the development of methods that linked physical experiments, field observations, and numerical models.

In addition to a 21 year-long teaching career at Delft, he undertook international collaboration, published widely, and was recognised with awards from bodies including the American Society of Civil Engineers and the Order of the Dannebrog from the Danish government. His research and published work often focused on the transition form empirical to computational approaches in coastal engineering, and in the establishment of integrated coastal management as a scientific and technical field.

== Career ==
=== Early life and studies ===
Bijker was born in Utrecht in 1924, and undertook civil engineering studies at the Polytechnic School of Utrecht in 1944. He graduated with honours from the Delft University of Technology in 1949. Following his studies in Delft, he joined the Waterloopkundig Laboratorium (Hydraulic Research Laboratory), and primarily worked at the "de Voorst" laboratory located in the Noordoostpolder.

=== The Waterloopkundig Laboratorium ===
During his tenure at the Waterloopkundig Laboratorium, Bijker held various roles including head of department, head of the de Voorst Laboratory, and deputy director. Whilst in this role, his significant contributions to coastal and hydraulic engineering gained him international acclaim. In 1977, Bijker initiated the specialist journal Coastal Engineering, and was its editor-in-chief until 1993.

He undertook key research on the scaling rules for coastal models and formulated his equation for wave-driven longitudinal transport along sandy coasts. His work ultimately culminated in a PhD in Technical Sciences, which he obtained for his dissertation titled Some considerations about scales for coastal models with movable bed, supervised by Professor H.J. Schoemaker, which focused on scaling considerations in movable-bed models, a type of physical coastal model in which the bathymetry is not fixed but is subject to change. This type of model has particular application in hydraulic engineering problems where sediment transport is important. The thesis described a transport formula for waves and currents, taking the increase of the bed shear of a uniform flow due to wave motion as a starting point. From this, Bijker derived scale relationships for modelling of sediment transport under the combined effects of waves and currents. The thesis was also published separately as a technical report.

=== Teaching ===
As early as 1957, Bijker became involved in education as a teacher at the then International Course (now UNESCO-IHE). He fulfilled this task for 40 years and thus contributed significantly to establishing the name of the Netherlands as a leading player in (coastal) hydraulic engineering. Through his international students, his approach, which was always based on a combination of theory and practice, was accepted and propagated all over the world. His involvement in education was greatly intensified after his appointment as professor of coastal engineering at TU Delft. He accepted this professorship with the inaugural address Varen is noodzakelijk, leven...? (English: Sailing is necessary, living...?) in 1969.

Among his notables students was Jan Agema. Bijker was popular with his students, noted as a passionate and inspiring teacher who contributed significantly to the formation of generations of Dutch coastal hydraulic engineers for more than twenty years. He retired in 1989, and gave a valedictory address, De kust in een PC? (English: The coast in a PC?), in which he examined the growing role of numerical modelling in coastal engineering. Bijker argued that advances in computing made it possible to simulate complex coastal systems, but emphasised that such models depend critically on a sound understanding of the underlying physical processes. He discussed the importance of preserving coastlines, both for their recreational value and for the survival of the local populations, and suggested alternative methods for preserving them, including breakwaters and sand nourishment.

He also acknowledged the importance of industry partnerships and student contributions to research, and emphasised the need for holistic understanding and planning in coastal management, with an appreciation for both the natural coastal dynamics and the human use of coastal areas. Bijker also acknowledged the possibility of a future in which numerical modelling could fully capture the development of a coast, but warned that significant fundamental research was needed to reach this point. He promoted the benefits of research with institutions such as the Waterloopkundig Laboratorium, and advocated for the expansion of international cooperation.

=== Research, consultancy and international work ===
In addition to his work at TU Delft, Bijker was also closely involved in the work of the Technische Adviescommissie voor de Waterkeringen (TAW - Technical Advisory Committee for Flood Defences), the Civieltechnisch Centrum Uitvoering Research en Regelgeving (CUR - Centre for Civil Engineering Research and Codes) and the Subsidence Committee.

He published widely in Dutch and English, and presented at national and international civil and hydraulic engineering conferences. Shortly before his retirement, Bijker organized the International Conference of Coastal Engineering in Delft in 1990. Bijker received international recognition and awards on several occasions, including the International Coastal Engineering Award from the ASCE in 1986, and the Knight in the Danebrog Order (Denmark) award.

Bijker consistently demonstrated a robust commitment to international collaboration. His involvement in the International Conference on Coastal Engineering (ICCE) was a testament to this dedication. However, when the American Society of Civil Engineers (ASCE) elected to host the ICCE in South Africa in 1982, during Apartheid, Bijker emerged as a prominent force advocating for the boycott of this conference. In response to the situation, the Conference on Coastal and Port Engineering in Developing Countries (COPEDEC) was inaugurated, with the leadership and funding of the Netherlands, Denmark, Germany, and the United Kingdom. It established its secretariat in Colombo, Sri Lanka. To this day, the conference is still organised quadrennially, now under the aegis of PIANC.

Although this stance led to tension with a handful of American engineers in 1982, Bijker was subsequently honoured with the International Coastal Engineering Award by the ASCE in 1986. Early in his career, Bijker began instructing at the UNESCO-IHE and continued to do so far into his retirement, until the year 2000.

== Personal life ==
Bijker died in 2012. His son, Wiebe E. Bijker, is an engineer and sociologist who taught at Maastricht University.

== Selected bibliography ==
- Bijker, E.W. (1992). Mechanics of Sediment Transport by the Combination of Waves and Current. Report.
- Bijker, E.W. (1989). De kust in een PC? (English: The coast in a PC?). Public lecture.
- Bijker, E.W., De Bruyn, C.A. (1988). Erosion around a pile due to current and breaking waves. In: Coastal Engineering 1988, 1368-1381.
- Bijker, E.W. (1986). Scour around structures. In: Coastal Engineering 1986, 1754-1768.
- Bijker, E.W., Leeuwestein, W. (1984). "Interaction between pipelines and the seabed under the influence of waves and currents." In: Seabed Mechanics: Edited Proceedings of a Symposium, sponsored jointly by the International Union of Theoretical and Applied Mechanics (IUTAM) and the International Union of Geodesy and Geophysics (IUGG), and held at the University of Newcastle upon Tyne, 5--9 September 1983, 235-242. Springer.
- Bijker, E.W., Van De Graaff, J. (1983). Littoral drift in relation to shoreline protection. In: Shoreline Protection, 81-86. Thomas Telford Publishing.
- Bijker, E.W., Van der Leijé, J.P., Pilon, J.J., Svasek, J.N., In 't Veld, J.K., Verhagen, H.J. (1981). Coastal Changes due to the Construction of Artificial Harbour Entrances and Practical Solutions, including Beach Replenishment. Conference paper.
- Agema, J.F., Glerum, A., Bijker, E.W. (1980). Inleiding in de waterbouwkunde f1. (English: Introduction to Hydraulic Engineering Volume 1). Lecture notes.
- Bijker, E.W., Van Hijum, E., Vellinga, P. (1976). Sand transport by waves. In: Coastal Engineering 1976, 1149-1167.
- Bijker, E.W., Kalkwijk, J.P.Th., Pieters, T. (1975). Mass transport in gravity waves on a sloping bottom. Report.
- Bijker, E.W. (1972). Introduction to Coastal Engineering and Breakwaters. Lecture notes.
- Bijker, E.W. (1972). Topics in coastal engineering. Lecture notes.
- Bijker, E.W. (1971). "Longshore transport computations." Journal of the Waterways, Harbors and Coastal Engineering Division, 97(4), 687-701. American Society of Civil Engineers.
- Bijker, E.W. (1971). Littoral drift computations on mutual wave and current influence. Report.
- De Best, A., Bijker, E.W. (1971). Scouring of a sand bed in front of a vertical breakwater. Report.
- Bijker, E.W. (1970). Coastal Engineering. Lecture notes.
- Battjes, J.A., Bijker, E.W. (1969). Symposium "Research on wave action": Proceedings, Delft Hydraulics Laboratory, Delft, The Netherlands, July 1969. Book.
- Bijker, E.W. (1969). "Littoral drift as function of waves and current." In: Coastal Engineering 1968, 415-435.
- Bijker, E.W. (1969). Varen is noodzakelijk, leven...? (English: Sailing is Necessary, Living...?). Public lecture.
- Bijker, E.W. (1968). Kustwaterbouwkunde (English: Coastal Hydraulic Engineering). Lecture notes.
- Bijker, E.W. (1967). Some considerations about scales for coastal models with movable bed. Doctoral thesis.
- Bijker, E.W. (1967). Some considerations about scales for coastal models with movable bed. Report.
- Bijker, E.W. (1965). Increase of bottom shear stress of a current due to wave motion. Report.
- Bijker, E.W. (1963). Developments in model investigations of coasts and harbours. Chapter in the book Selected aspects of hydraulic engineering, Liber Amicorum dedicated to Johannes Theodoor Thijsse, on the occasion of his retirement as professor of Theoretical and Applied Hydraulics at the Technological University of Delft.
- Bijker, E.W. (1960). Summary of model tests on impact forces on Hanstholm breakwaters. Report.
- Bijker, E.W. (1960). Kustvormen (English: Coastal forms). Lecture notes.
- Vinckers, J.B., Bijker, E.W., Schijf, J.B. (1953). Bed-load transportmeter for fine sand "Sphinx". Conference paper.

The institutional repository of TU Delft gives access to many of the above publications.
