= Willem van der Woude =

Dutch mathematician (1876–1974)

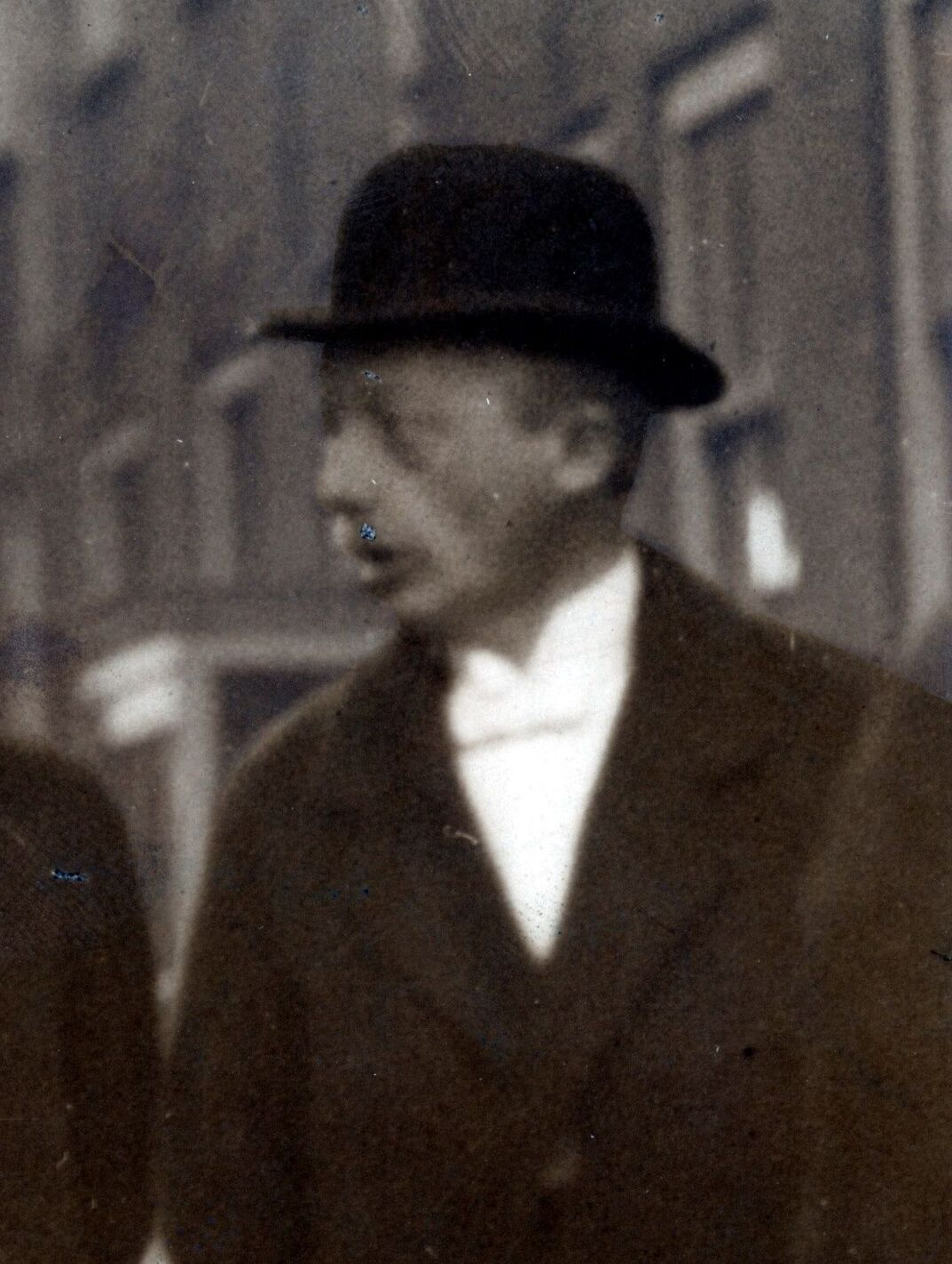
- Van der Woude in Leiden (1917)
- Born: 15 January 1876; Oosternijkerk
- Died: 23 September 1974 (aged 98); Oegstgeest
- Education: University of Groningen
- Scientific career
- Fields: Mathematics
- Workplaces: University of Leiden
- Doctoral students: Gerrit Bol; Tatyana Pavlovna Ehrenfest; Egbert van Kampen; Nicolaas Kuiper; Jo Johannis Dronkers

Willem van der Woude (15 January 1876 – 23 September 1974) was a Dutch mathematician and rector magnificus (chancellor) of the University of Leiden.

== Education and career ==
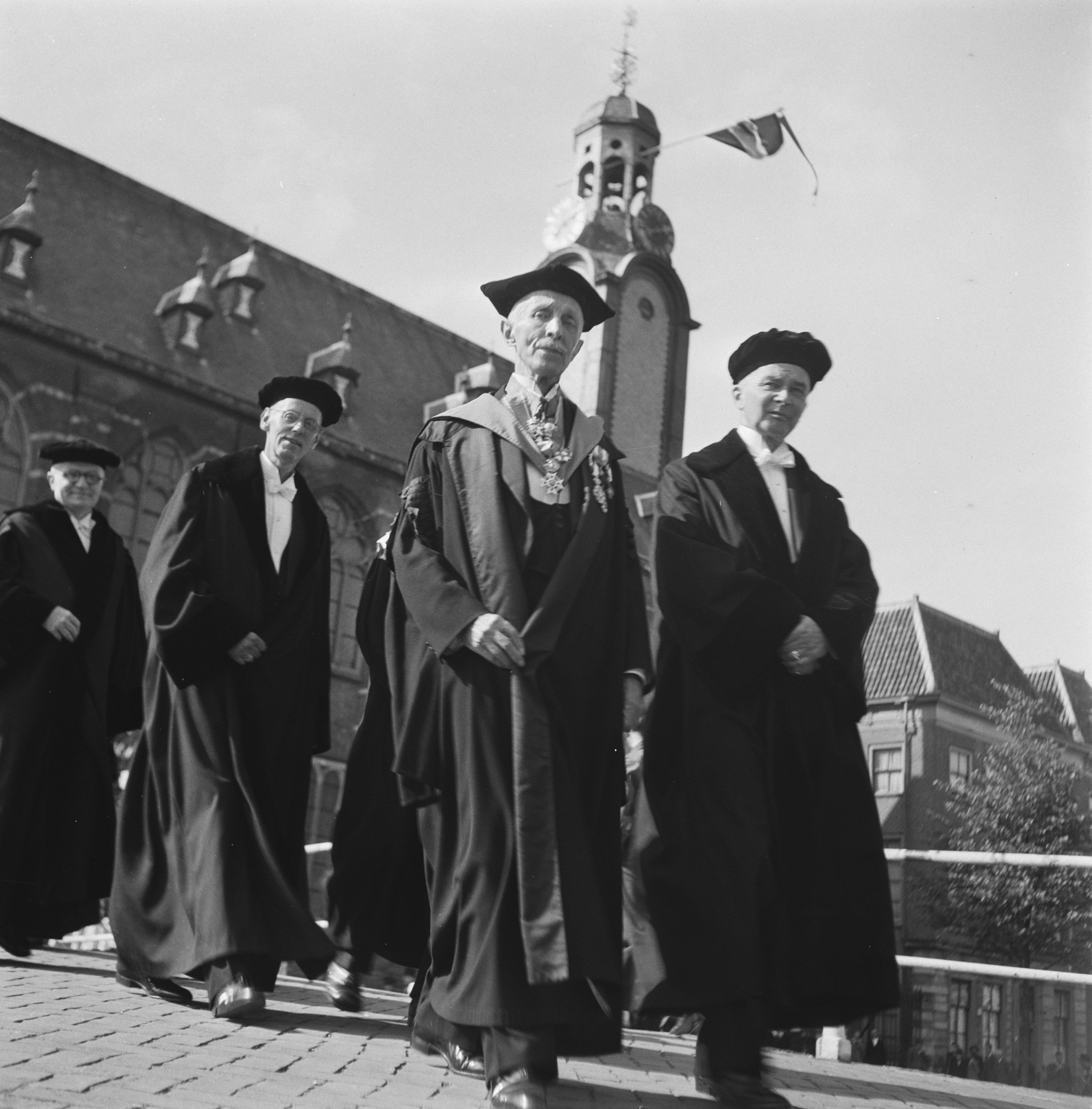
Van der Woude (middle) as rector in Leiden (1945)

Van der Woude studied at the University of Groningen, and subsequently, from 1901 to 1916, worked as a secondary school teacher in Deventer. In 1908 he received his Ph.D. from the University of Groningen under Pieter Hendrik Schoute with a thesis titled Over elkaar snijdende normalen aan een ellipsoide en een hyperellipsoide (On intersecting normals to an ellipsoid and a hyperellipsoid). From 1916 until his retirement as professor emeritus in 1947 he was professor of mathematics and mechanics at the University of Leiden.

In 1924, he was an invited speaker at the International Congress of Mathematicians in Toronto. In the years 1923, 1924, 1939 and 1940 he chaired the Royal Dutch Mathematical Society.

He acted as rector magnificus of the University of Leiden during three separate periods: 1934–1935, 1941–43 and 1945 (until he was succeeded by Berend George Escher).

== Selected publications ==
- Over 't snijpuntenstelsel van twee algebraïsche krommen. Noordhoff. 1916. (On the intersection system of two algebraic curves)
- Meetkunde en ruimteleer. Stenfert Kroese. 1935. (On geometry and theories of space)
