= Storm Ciarán =

European windstorm in 2023

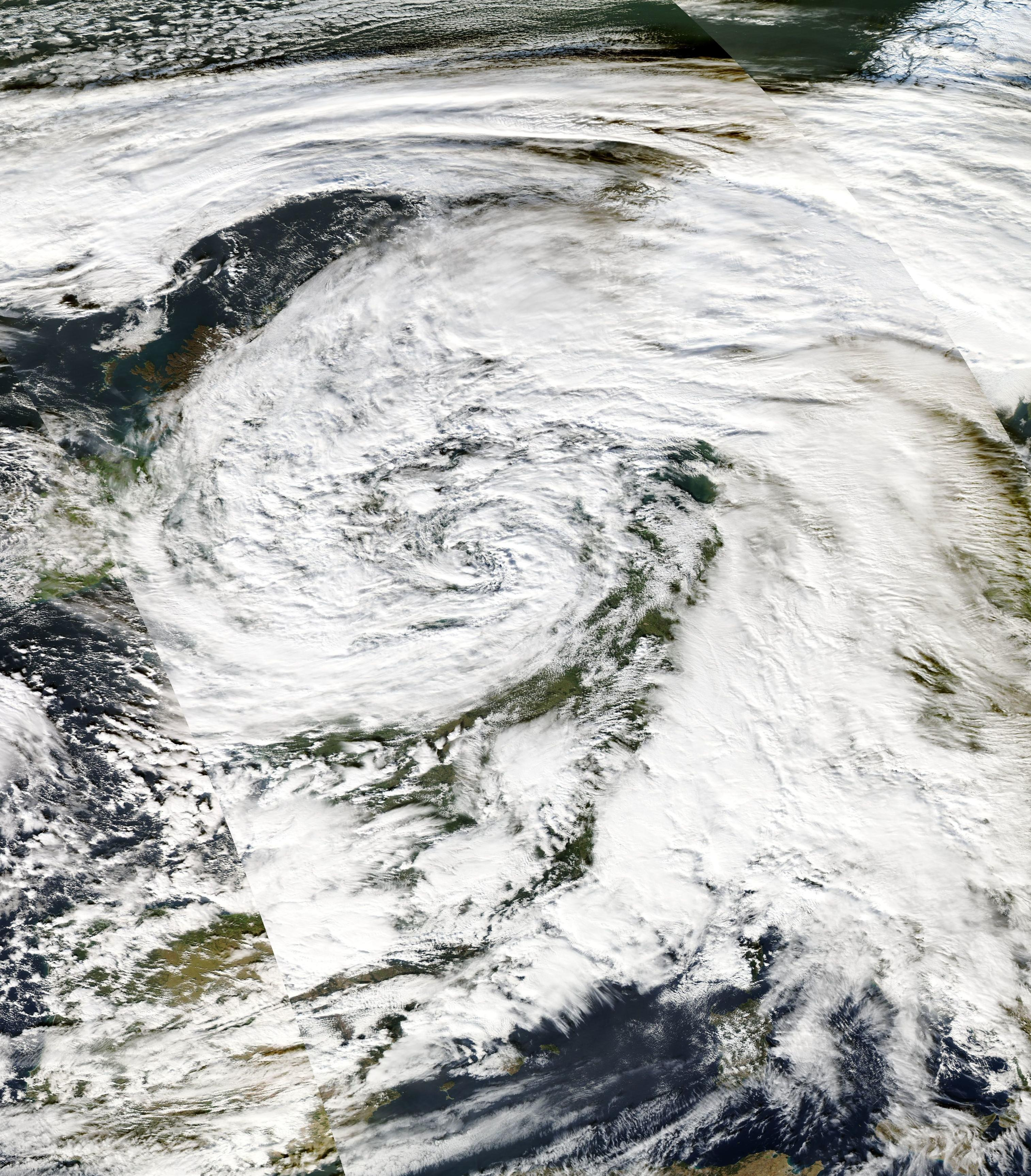
- Area affected: Ireland, United Kingdom, Benelux, France, Spain, Czech Republic, Italy, Channel Islands
- Date of impact: 29 October – 4 November 2023
- Maximum wind gust: Tornadic – 290 km/h (180 mph) (IF3 Lavino, Bulgaria tornado): 4 November 2023; Non-tornadic – 207 km/h (129 mph), Pointe du Raz, Brittany, France: 2 November 2023
- Fatalities: 21
- Power outages: 1,305,321
- Damage: €1.91 billion (2023) (US$2.22 billion)

Storm Ciarán, known in Germany as Storm Emir was a European windstorm that severely affected parts of Europe from late October to early November 2023. Part of the 2023–24 European windstorm season, Ciarán impacted northwestern Europe and killed 21 people, eleven of whom were in Italy and four in France. It also caused mass disruption to transport. Widespread damage from 100 miles per hour (160 km/h) winds were reported in the Channel Islands, while 1.2 million French households were left without electricity.

== Prelude ==
Storm Ciarán was named by the United Kingdom's Met Office on 29 October, while the Free University of Berlin in Germany named the system Emir on 30 October. It was expected to bring winds of 90 to 120 km/h (60 to 70 mph) widely with >130 km/h (>80 mph) on some coasts. More heavy rainfall was expected to fall which would exacerbate the flooding from Storm Babet a week prior.

The Met Office's long-range forecast stated that Storm Ciarán would move away on 3 November, with many places still with blistering winds and rain spells. The Channel Islands were due to be hit with gusts around 95 mph (153 km/h) with schools closed and a red weather warning in place. On 1 November, this was updated to a Force 11 violent storm, with the Met Office stating that Storm Ciarán was undergoing explosive cyclogenesis. The storm would impact the Netherlands on 2 November. The storm especially affected the Isle of Jersey, where a strong thunderstorm formed a tornado alongside the golf ball sized hail with windspeeds of the storm reaching over 100 mph (160 km/h).

== The event ==
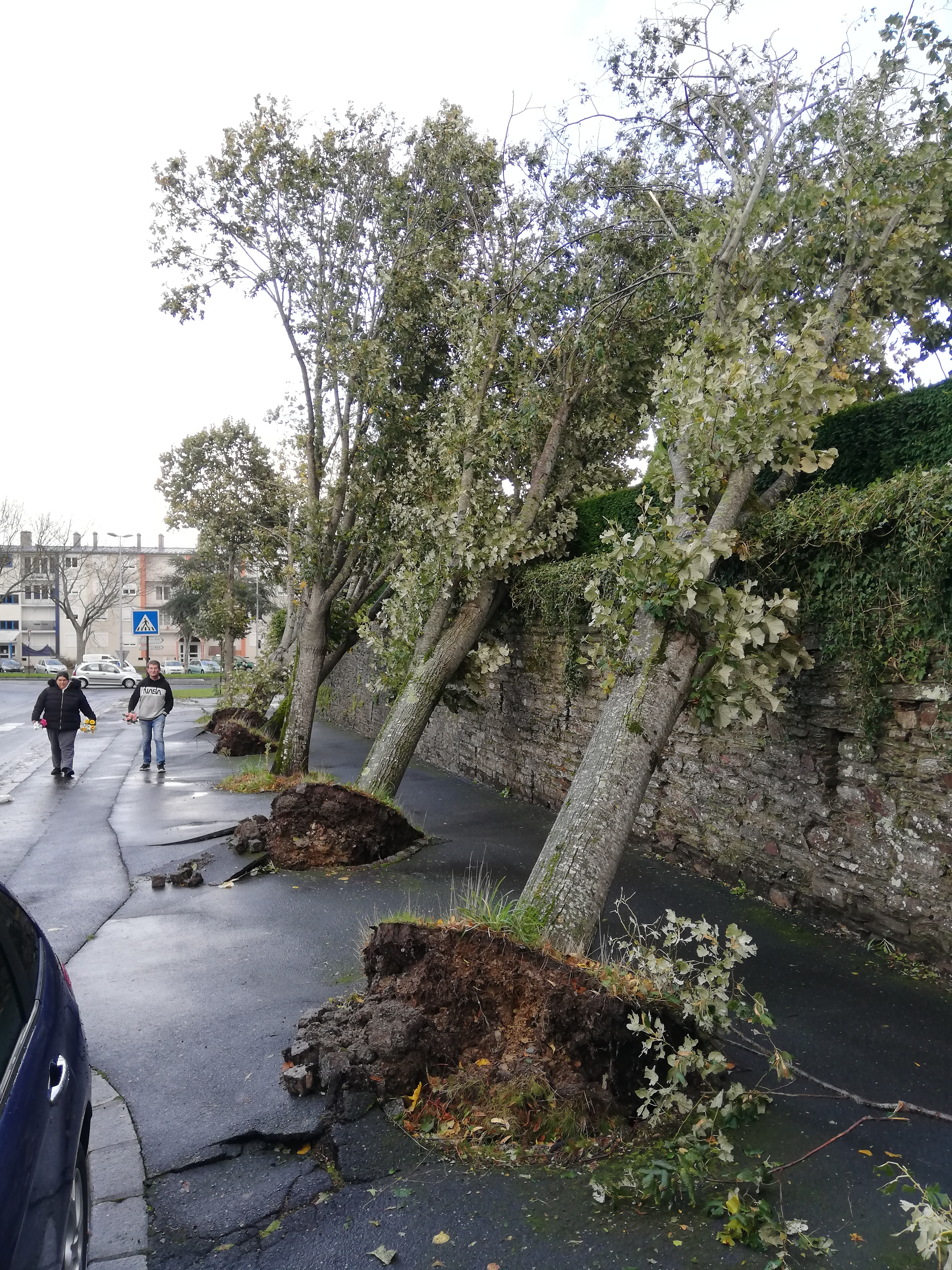
Lying platanus trees, Saint-Lô, France

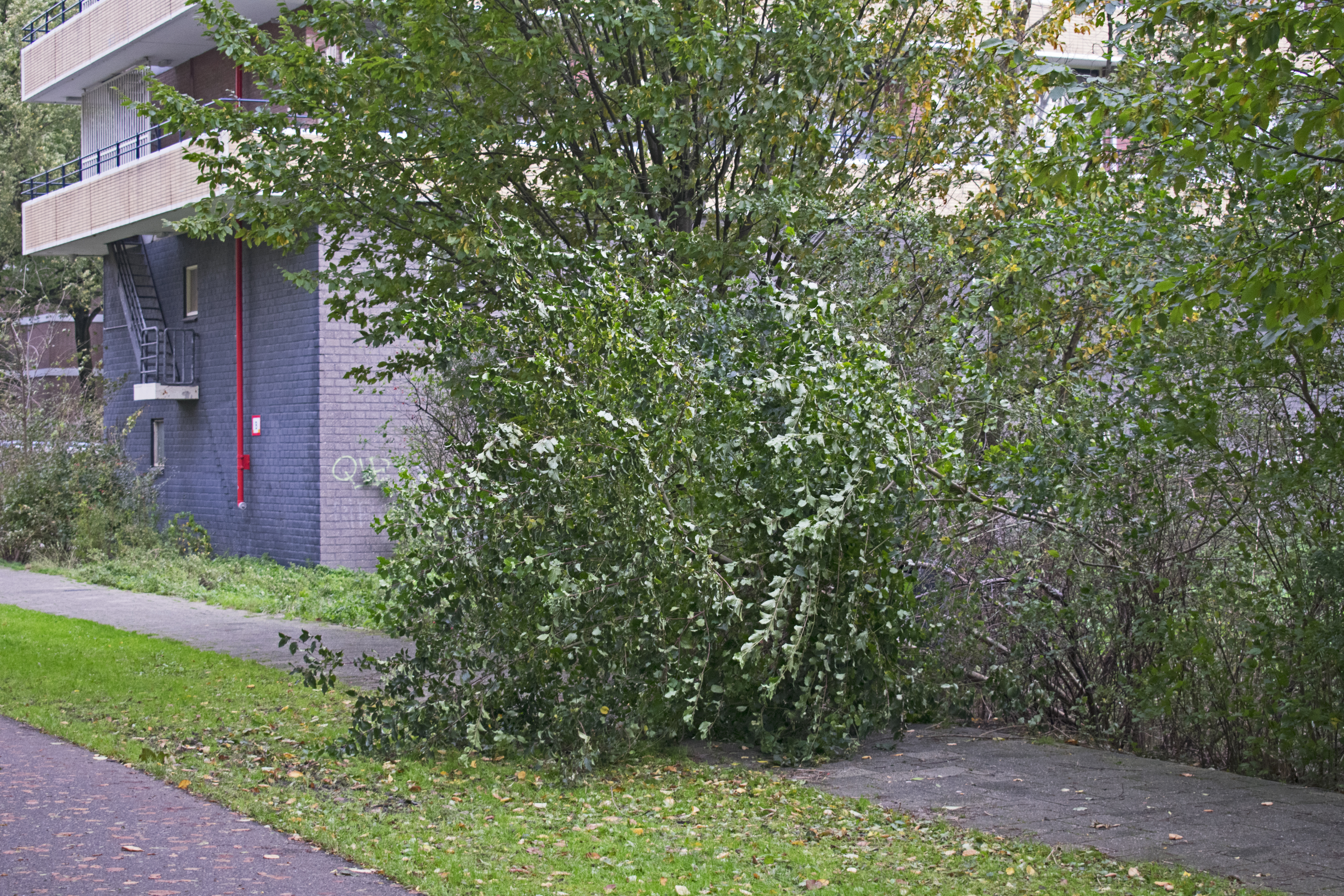
A tree fallen across a pedestrian path, Delft, the Netherlands

A large yellow weather warning for rain and wind in place for the South Wales, Devon and Cornwall, south coast and the east coast of East Anglia. In Cornwall, 4,000 properties were left without power. In Devon, 250 schools were closed. In Dorset, the Freshwater Beach Holiday Park at Burton Bradstock was destroyed. Other places in Dorset affected included Loders, Easton and West Bay. A caravan park at Tenby in Wales was evacuated due to flooding. Moyles Court School in the New Forest was closed due to flooding.

The southern coast of England and France were severely affected by the storm, with record wind gusts in France being reported around 129 mph (208 km/h). The storm also caused flooding and huge waves.

In the Netherlands, an orange weather warning was given for the coastal provinces for high winds. Events were cancelled, including at the last-minute the Dutch Headwind Cycling Championships. There was disruption due to cancelled flights and trains. People were advised to work at home, and to not drive unnecessarily. The Dutch Railways adjusted the timetable with fewer trains.

Twenty-one people were killed during the storm, including: a 46-year-old woman who died in Germany when a tree fell on her. A 5-year-old child and a 64-year-old woman were killed by falling trees in Belgium. A 23-year-old woman died in Madrid, Spain. In Venray, the Netherlands, a person was killed when a tree fell on their car. On 3 November, a man was killed inside his vehicle in Albania.

In France, a truck driver was killed by a falling tree, a 72-year-old man was blown off his balcony, a 43-year-old died after being swept away by a wave, while a 46-year-old technician was killed on 4 November while trying to restore electricity to homes.

Eight people were killed during heavy rains in the region of Tuscany, Italy, with rivers flooding and causing damage. Several roads and highways were closed amid landslides. Floods also occurred in the region of Veneto, with a 40-year-old man being killed after falling from the Corno d'Acquilio mountain, while a 44-year-old man was killed in Belluno. Severe damage also occurred in Campobasso and other areas of Molise, as well as in Abruzzo and the Rome area; emergency measures were also taken in Campania. In Sardinia, strong winds fueled fires that burned hectares of vegetation, while a man was killed in Capoterra while battling fires, and an entire sawmill burned down in Tortolì.

The Jersey Zoo announced that one of their Chilean flamingos had been killed by the storm, but all the other animals had been accounted for. They further stated that the zoo would be closed until 6 November 2023, so any remaining debris could be cleared.

In total, there were more than 1 million people without power, and in Cornwall around 4,000 properties were left without power. Damage assessed by PERLIS was finalized at €2.067 billion (US$2.22 billion), while the damage in France alone reached €1.772 billion (US$1.9 billion).

== Highest wind gust per country ==
Country	Gust	Location
Belgium	105 km/h (65 mph)	Zeebrugge
France	207 km/h (129 mph)	Pointe du Raz
Germany	144 km/h (89 mph)	Brocken
Ireland	145 km/h (90 mph)	Hook Lighthouse
Italy	197 km/h (122 mph)	Punta Ala
Luxembourg	102 km/h (63 mph)	Wiltz
Netherlands	116 km/h (72 mph)	IJmuiden
Spain	140 km/h (87 mph)	Vila d'Eivissa
United Kingdom	154 km/h (96 mph)	The Needles
Jersey	167 km/h (104 mph)	St. Clement
Guernsey	125 km/h (78 mph)	Guernsey Airport

== Tornado outbreak ==
Storm Ciarán spawned 9 tornadoes across Europe.

IFU	IF0	IF0.5	IF1	IF1.5	IF2	IF2.5	IF3	IF4	IF5
1	0	0	4	1	1	0	2	0	0

List of confirmed tornadoes – Wednesday, November 1, 2023
IF#	Location	District/ County	Coord.	Time (UTC)	Path length	Comments/Damage
United Kingdom
F1/T2	Loders	Dorset		22:45	2.4 km	TORRO site investigation - Rated T2/3.
IF3/T6	St Clement	Jersey	49.17°N 2.08°W	23:54	8 km	A significant tornado crossed the island of Jersey from St Clement to Fliquet settlements. Numerous roofs and trees were downed or damaged. In a few cases, damage to walls occurred.
List of confirmed tornadoes – Thursday, November 2, 2023
IF#	Location	District/ County	Coord.	Time (UTC)	Path length	Comments/Damage
United Kingdom
F1/T2	Sompting	West Sussex	50.84°N 0.34°W	06:35	2 km	TORRO site investigation - Rated T2.
Italy
IF1	Castel Focognano	Tuscany	43.65°N 11.83°E	21:45	1.3 km	An IF1 rated tornado struck parts of Castel Focognano in Italy, damaging roofs and trees.
List of confirmed tornadoes – Saturday, November 4, 2023
IF#	Location	District/ County	Coord.	Time (UTC)	Path length	Comments/Damage
Bulgaria
IF3	Lavino	Silistra Province	43.78°N 26.96°E	09:50	15 km	On November 4, an intense tornado struck Lavino in Bulgaria. According to the European Severe Storms Laboratory, at least 150 structures were damaged, including homes that had walls collapse, earning a rating of IF3. One person was slightly injured.
IFU	Sratsimir	Silistra Province	44.04°N 27.32°E	10:25	Unknown	Tornado was observed. Time was based on radar data.
Greece
IF2	Xánthi	Western Thrace	41.13°N 24.89°E	10:25	1.5 km	Tornadic wind damage was reported. Two cars were overturned on a parking lot of LIDL supermarket (41.131°N 24.895°E). At least several damaged roofs and numerous downed trees and large tree branches were reported (especially along Geor. Kondyli street). A large tree branch fell on a moving bus, causing no injuries. Length of the damage path reached at least 1.5 km (between Geor. Kondyli street and EPS stadiums). Time was based on SAT data and recording from the CCTV camera.
France
IF1	La Pouëze	Pays de la Loire	47.55°N 0.80°W	11:10	5 km	Trees downed or uprooted, truck overturned.
Turkey
IF1.5	Dereköy	Aydın Province	37.59°N 27.73°E	23:20	5 km	Tornado reported which hit Dereköy village in Kocarli district, Aydin province. A mosque tower collapsed, power lines snapped, trees uprooted/snapped.

== Aftermath ==
A day after the storm there were still problems in the Netherlands. Several polders and gardens were flooded, including an apartment complex in Breda that has been evacuated due to flooding. The storm caused damage of more than €15 million in the Netherlands.

== See also ==
- Tornadoes of 2023
- Great Storm of 1987
- Braer Storm (1993) – the most intense European windstorm ever recorded; also underwent explosive cyclogenesis
- Cyclone Carmen (2010)
- Storm Dennis (2020)
