= Dutch Headwind Cycling Championships =

Dutch cycling time trial Championship

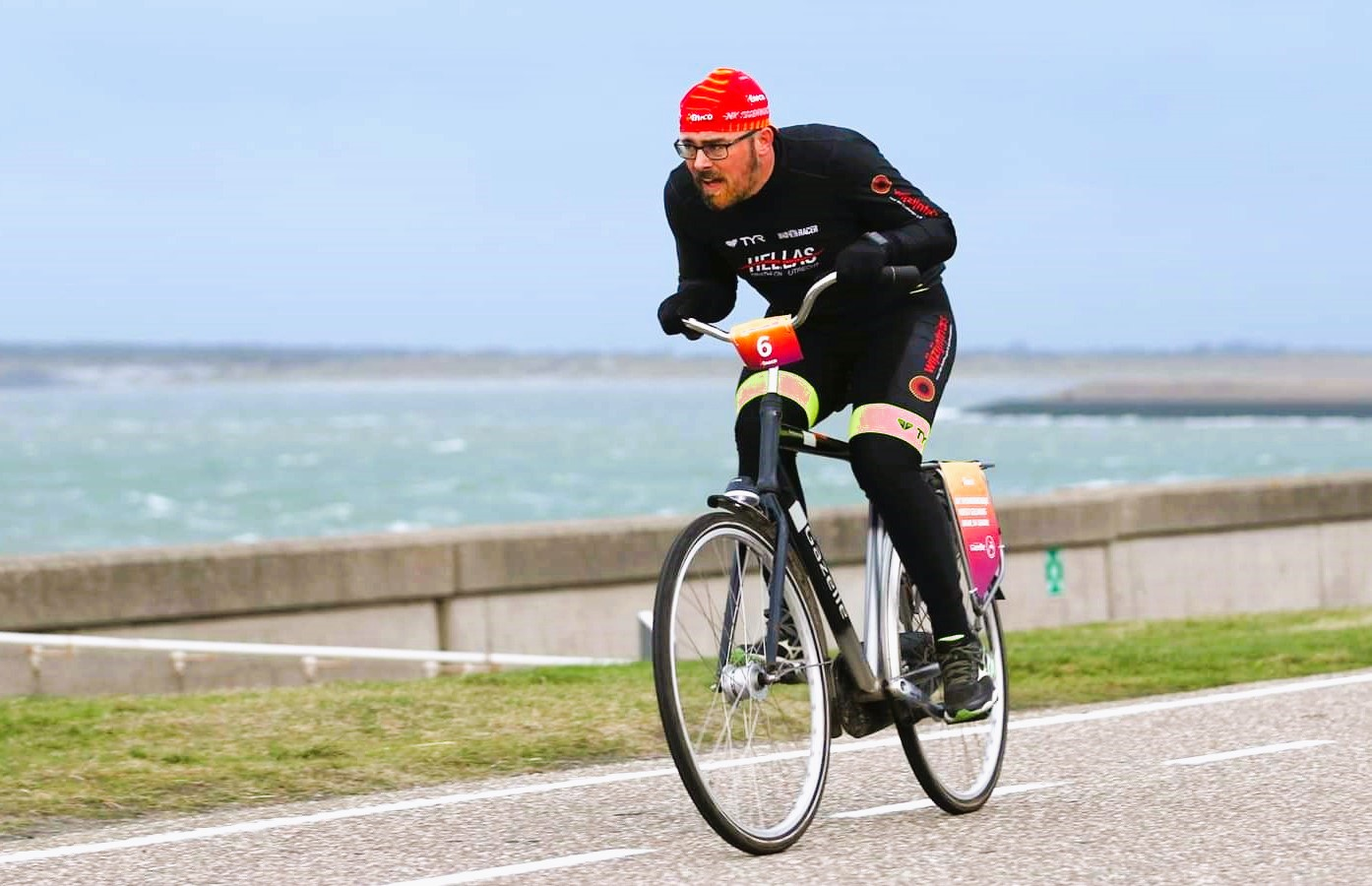

Race details
- Date: Fall or Winter; organized ad hoc when a storm is announced
- Region: Oosterscheldekering, Netherlands
- Local name(s): NK Tegenwindfietsen (in Dutch)
- Discipline: Road cycling
- Type: time trial

History
- First edition: 2013
- Editions: 7
- First winner: Men's: Bart Brentjens; Women's: Irene Tesink
- Most recent: Men's: Jurjun van der Velde; Women's: Lisa Scheenaard

The Dutch Headwind Cycling Championships (in Dutch: NK Tegenwindfietsen, pronounced [ˈteːxə(ɱ)ʋɪntˌfitsə(n)]) are an annual Dutch cycling time trial championships that takes place during storms of wind force 7 (50 km/h) or higher. They are not regulated by the Royal Dutch Cycling Union.

The Championships take place on the Oosterscheldekering storm barrier, which faces the North Sea, and have been held in autumn or winter since 2013. Competitors must ride the 8.5 km course against the wind on upright single-speed bicycles, which are provided by the organization. The championships are announced three days before a storm is expected. Since 2014 there is also a team time trial. A total of 200 individual cyclists (300 cyclists in 2020) can participate, plus 25 teams of four cyclists. Participants start 30 seconds apart from each other and the one with the fastest time wins.

In 2020 both the male and female reigning champions (from 2018) successfully defended their titles. In 2023 the event was cancelled because of heavy storm.

== Editions ==
Year	Date	Wind force	Men	Time	Women	Time	Team	Time
2013	December 15, 2013	5	(Netherlands) Bart Brentjens	17m 51sec	(Netherlands) Irene Tesink	19m 31sec	N/A	
2014	December 11, 2014	8 SW	(Netherlands) Wouter Mesker	18m 06sec	(Netherlands) Nathalie Simoens	22m 34sec	Wind in de Rug; Wouter Mesker; Kaj Hendriks; Melvin Hekman; Erik van Lakerveld	16m 30.653sec
2015	October 11, 2015	7	(Netherlands) Pico de Jager	19m15s	(Netherlands) Mathilde Matthijsse	21m23s	Wind in de Rug	18m39s
2016	November 20, 2016	9 (code yellow)	(Netherlands) Teun Sweere	22m30s	(Netherlands) Mathilde Matthijsse	28m09s	Jan de Jonge Fietsen	21m34s
2017	Did not take place, due to the absence of stormy conditions							
2018	December 8, 2018	7	(Netherlands) Max de Jong	18m16s	(Netherlands) Lisa Scheenaard	20m28s	Team Nooitstop	
2019	Did not take place							
2020	February 9, 2020 (during Storm Ciara)	8 (code orange)	(Netherlands) Max de Jong	20m00s	(Netherlands) Lisa Scheenaard	23m08s	No team winner — contest stopped early due to overly dangerous conditions	
2021	Did not take place due to COVID-19							
2022	February 6, 2022	7 (code yellow)	(Netherlands) Jurjun van der Velde	20m23s	(Netherlands) Lisa Scheenaard	22m53s	Team Nooitstop	15m14s
2023	Cancelled due to too heavy winds during Storm Ciarán							

== See also ==
- Dutch National Time Trial Championships
- Dutch National Road Race Championships
