= VolkerWessels =

Dutch construction company

Koninklijke VolkerWessels N.V.
- Former logo
- Type: Public (Naamloze vennootschap)
- Traded as: VOLKERWESSELS
- Industry: Construction, civil engineering
- Founded: 1854
- Headquarters: Amersfoort, Netherlands
- Key people: Jan de Ruiter (CEO), J.H.M. (Jan) Hommen (Chairman of the supervisory board)
- Revenue: ▲€5.714 billion (2017)
- Operating income: ▲€191 million) (2017)
- Net income: ▲€151 million (2017)
- Owner: Wessels family through Reggeborgh Holding B.V.
- Number of employees: 16,179 (2017)
- Website: www.volkerwessels.com

Koninklijke VolkerWessels N.V. is a major European construction services business with Dutch-based headquarters. It is owned by the Wessels Family through Reggeborgh Holding.

== History ==
The company was founded by Adriaan Volker in Sliedrecht in 1854. It merged with Stevin Groep to form Volker Stevin in 1978 and with Kondor Wessels in 1997 to form Volker Wessels Stevin.

In 2002, the firm was rebranded as VolkerWessels. In 2010, in response to a drop in privately-financed construction projects, the company's UK-based operation made use of its parent company's maritime experience to pursue more opportunities in the marine infrastructure sector. The late 2010s was a period of growth for the company; turnover increased by 20 percent in 2019 alone. In November of that same year, the Dutch investment company Reggeborgh, which already held a 63.5 percent stake in VolkerWessels, offered to purchase all outstanding shares in the firm in exchange for £575 million, which resulted in the company being delisted from the Amsterdam Stock Exchange to become a private company.

In the early 2020s, the lengthy disruption caused by of the COVID-19 pandemic negatively impacted VolkerWessels, which had furloughed much of its workforce for a time and had explicitly attributed the pandemic for a £6.4 million loss being recorded for 2020. On the pandemic, the company spoke out on the need to maintain sufficient cash reserved throughout crisis events, noting that it was insolvency, rather than losses, that would typically undo a business. In 2022, the company returned to profitable operations and publicly warned about the impact of rising prices for both material and labour on its operations.

During 2023, via two subsidiary companies, VolkerWessels UK became the first entity to be certified to the BS 99001 standard, signifying the company's consideration for social, economic, and sustainability factors in its undertakings. That same year, VolkerWessels was allegedly late paying its suppliers 25 percent of the time. During 2024, the company's profitability grew on the back of its activities in the civil sector, having secured particularly lucrative projects in both the infrastructure and entertainment subsectors. In 2025, the firm was able to increase its profitability despite a slowdown in the commercial sector due to the securing of several large contracts across the marine, water and highways sectors. In July of same year, it was announced that Van Elle, the largest ground engineering contractor in the UK, had agreed terms to acquire the concrete piling assets of VolkerGround Engineering.

== Operations ==
The company is organised into the following divisions:

- Building and property development
- Infrastructure
- VolkerWessels UK
- VolkerWessels Canada
- Energy, infrastructure technology and telecoms
- Supplies and marine services

The company is the eponymous sponsor of the VolkerWessels Cycling Team.

== Major projects ==
Major projects undertaken by the company include the Eastern Scheldt storm surge barrier completed in 1986, the Gateshead Millennium Bridge completed in 2001 and the Euroborg soccer stadium for FC Groningen in Groningen completed in 2006.

VolkerWessels has been a major supplier to Network Rail, being involved in schemes such as the Midland Rail Hub. The company is also involved in the construction of High Speed 2, being a member of a joint venture to deliver lot C1, which was due to be completed in 2031.
