= Ballast Nedam =

Dutch construction and engineering company

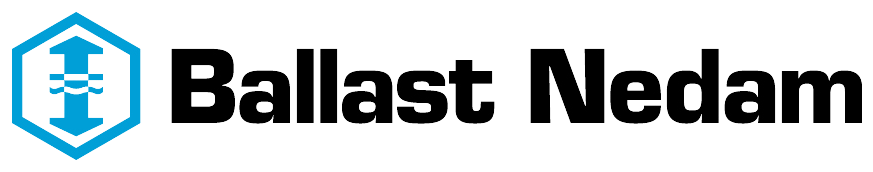
- Type: Private company
- ISIN: NL0000336543
- Industry: Construction, civil engineering, development
- Founded: Amsterdam, Netherlands (4 April 1877)
- Headquarters: Nieuwegein, Netherlands
- Area served: Worldwide
- Key people: E. Van Zuthem, H. Kocak,
- Products: Infrastructure, building, industrial, commercial, epc-f / ppp
- Number of employees: 2,500 (2022)
- Parent: Rönesans Holding
- Website: www.ballast-nedam.com

Ballast Nedam is a Dutch construction and engineering company headquartered in Nieuwegein. The company resulted from the 1969 merger between Amsterdamse Ballast Maatschappij, founded in 1877, and Nederlandse Aannemingsmaatschappij, founded in 1917. Since 2015, the company has been owned by Renaissance Construction, a unit of Turkish conglomerate Rönesans Holding.

== History ==
=== Ballast ===
The existence of the Amsterdamsche Ballast Maatschappij can be attributed to the North Sea Canal (Noordzeekanaal), whose original operations began in 1877. Empty merchant ships going to sea obtained dune sand as ballast. In later years, the company also undertook dredging work. In the first decade of the 20th century, the company began to grow under the direction of Charles de Vilder, a paver and roadworker based in Amsterdam. Ballast evolved from a sand supplier to a construction firm, and from 1928 onwards, also operated as a concrete manufacturer. The introduction of the first labour-saving excavator in 1927 marked the automation of sand extraction. After the war, Ballast focused increasingly on dredging operations – and later, on civil engineering works too – abroad. The firm established its reputation within Dutch borders with the construction of the Afsluitdijk (Closure-dike) (1932) and the Velser tunnels (1957).

=== Nedam ===
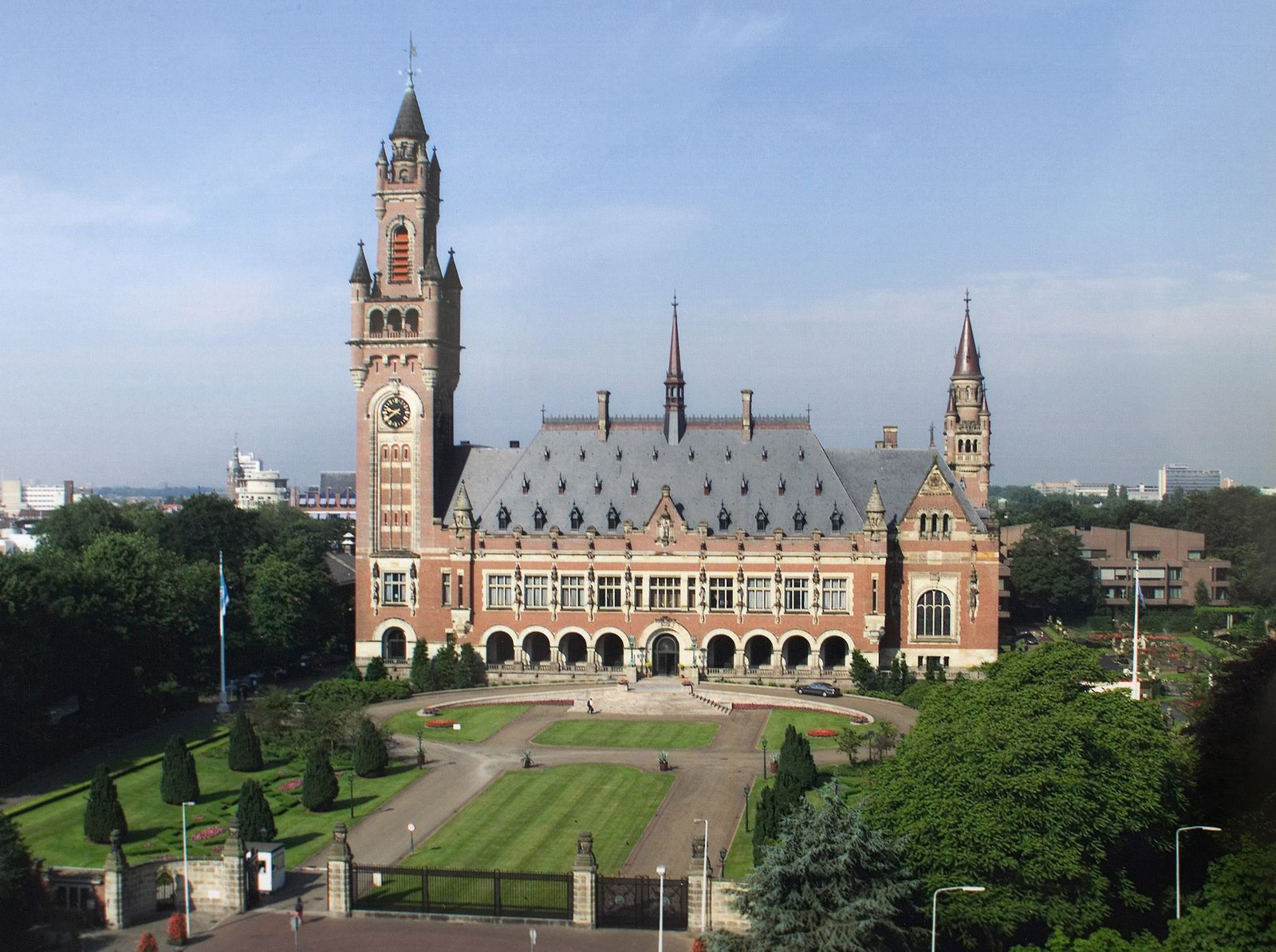
The Peace Palace in The Hague, Netherlands

H.F. Boersma set up in business as a contractor in Den Haag from 1899 onwards. He began with the construction of villas and country houses, but earned his reputation through the construction of the Peace Palace (Vredespaleis) (1913). In 1917, Boersma founded the company Nederlandse Aannemingsmaatschappij. The building activities went so well that by 1921 he had already begun to establish a building company in what was known at the time as the Dutch East Indies. Nedam became more widely known through the construction of the Hague Convention Bureau (Congresgebouw), the former Bijenkorf department store in Rotterdam, and the Nederlandse Handels Maatschappij (Netherlands Trading Company) headquarters in Amsterdam, known as the Bazel building.

=== Merger ===
The Ballast Nedam Group came into being through the amalgamation of the two companies in 1969. The former Ballast contracts with the Middle East were extended, and Ballast Nedam was involved in the start of mammoth projects such as the Kuwait airport and the King Fahd Causeway, one of the longest cross-channel connections in the world. Works of distinction in the Netherlands include the development and construction of the Maarssenbroek district in the province of Utrecht (from the 1970s), the Oosterschelde dam (1986, the largest section of the Delta Works), the design of the modern Amsterdam Airport Schiphol and the construction of the Amsterdam Stopera (City Hall and Opera House) (1986). The Ballast Nedam Group grew as a result of the acquisition of Van Grootel's Bouwmaatschappij (Housing Company) in 1974. Three years later, the name was changed to Ballast Nedam B.V.

In May 1994, BN shares were once again quoted on the Amsterdam stock exchange, and the private limited company became a public limited company once more. The company strengthened its position in the Dutch market through acquisitions, and also acquired a United Kingdom contractor, Wiltshier - later renamed Ballast Wiltshier - in 1995. It sold its dredging activities in 2002. Ballast Nedam then withdrew from the international project market and concentrated its activities mainly within the Netherlands. Its UK business went into administration in October 2003.

=== Rönesans Holding ===
In September 2015 Renaissance Infrastructure B.V. has made a recommended public offer on all Ballast Nedam shares. The offer was concluded successfully in 2016, making Renaissance the main shareholder. As of 26 February 2016 Ballast Nedam is delisted. İpek Ilıcak Kayaalp, the Chair of the Holding has become the chair of the supervisory board.

== Select projects ==
- Peace Palace (1913) in The Hague, Netherlands
- Van Nellefabriek (1931) in Rotterdam, Netherlands
- Afsluitdijk (1933) between the Dutch provinces of North Holland and Friesland
- Zeeland Bridge (1965) between Schouwen-Duiveland and Noord-Beveland in the province of Zeeland, Netherlands
- Kuwait International Airport in Farwaniyah, Kuwait, 15.5 kilometers (9.6 mi) south of Kuwait City
- Botlek Tunnel (1980) between two sides of the Maas river in Rotterdam, Netherlands
- King Fahd Causeway (1986) between Saudi Arabia and Bahrain
- Oosterscheldekering (1986) between Schouwen-Duiveland and Noord-Beveland
- Amsterdam Arena (1996) football stadium of AFC Ajax in Amsterdam, Netherlands
- Windpark Egmond aan Zee (2007): the first large scale offshore wind farm built off the Dutch North Sea coast
- Kustwerk Katwijk (2015): car parking on the Boulevard Zeezijde promenade in Katwijk
- Stadskantoor Venlo (2016): cradle-to-cradle city hall in Venlo, Netherlands
- Ecoduct Zeepoort (2017): ensures good connection between the subregions in the National Park, Netherlands.
