= Deltar =

Analogue computer used in the Dutch Delta Works project

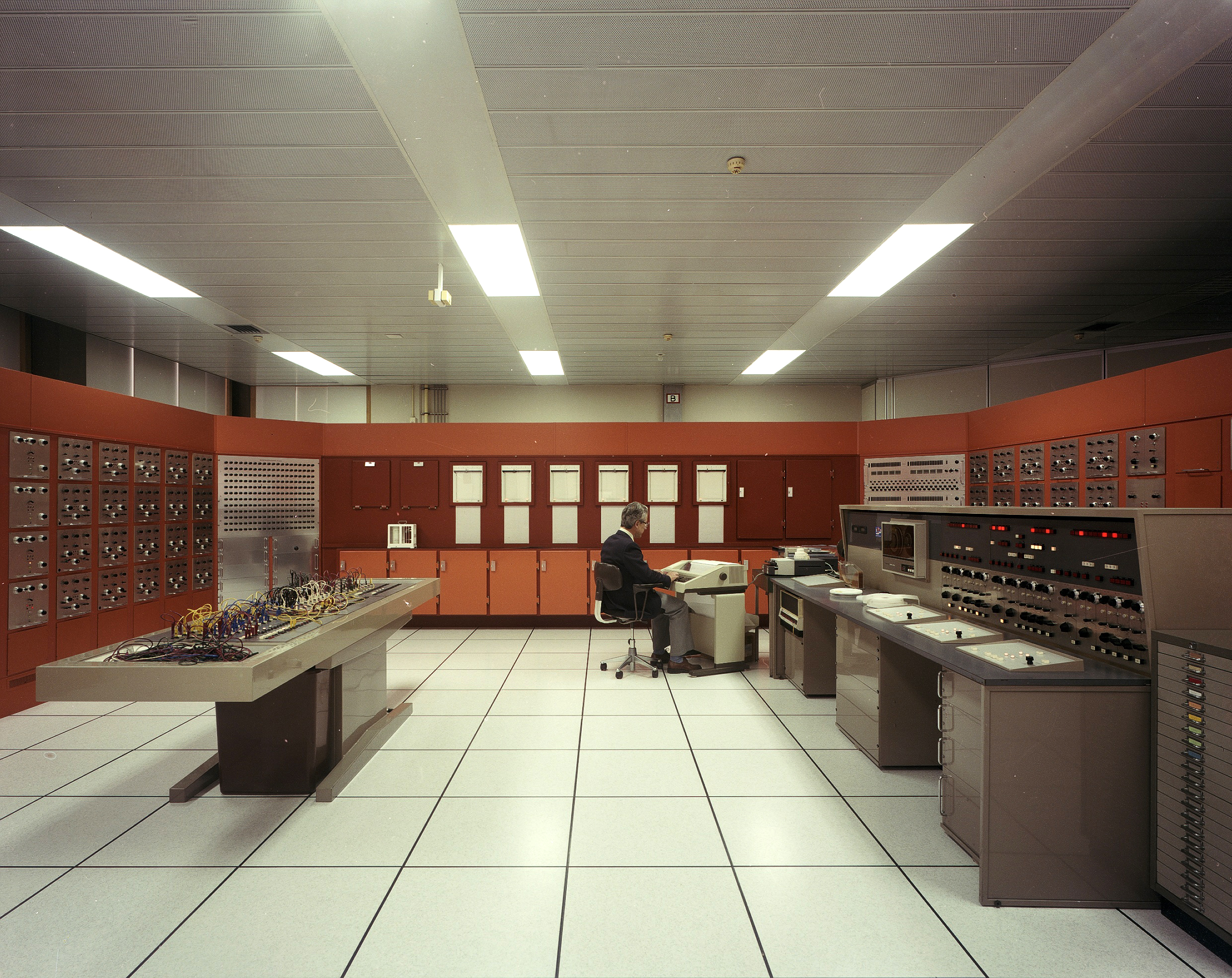
Room view - Deltar analogue computer at the DIV of Rijkswaterstaat in 1984

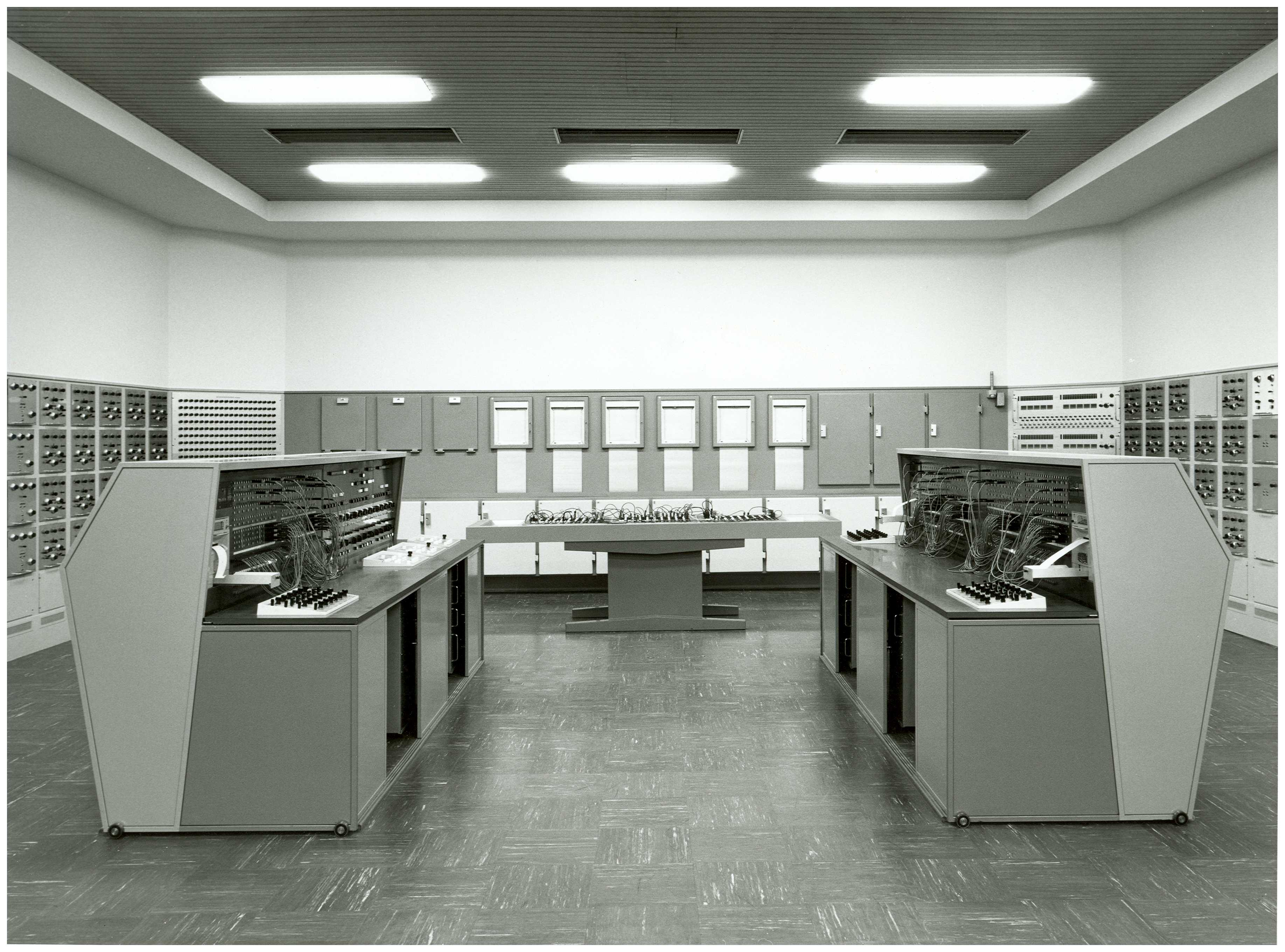
The Deltar (27 January 1972)

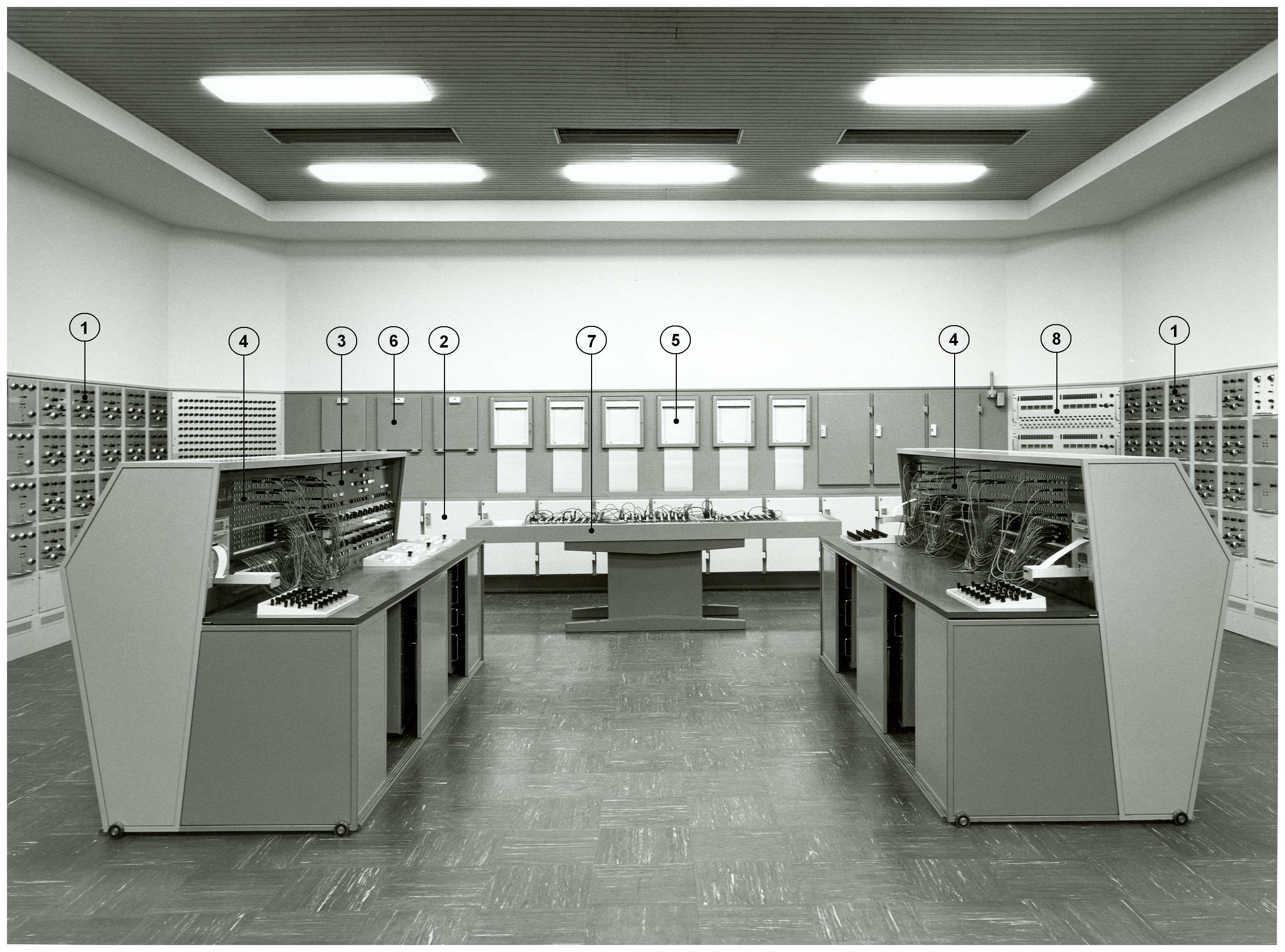
Layout of the Deltar.: 1. Analog river sections; 2. Peripheral equipment (Punched tape); 3. Operator controls; 4. Measuring controls; 5. Analog output (recorders); 6. Digital output (punched tape); 7. Design table (configuration of river setup); 8. Wind generator.

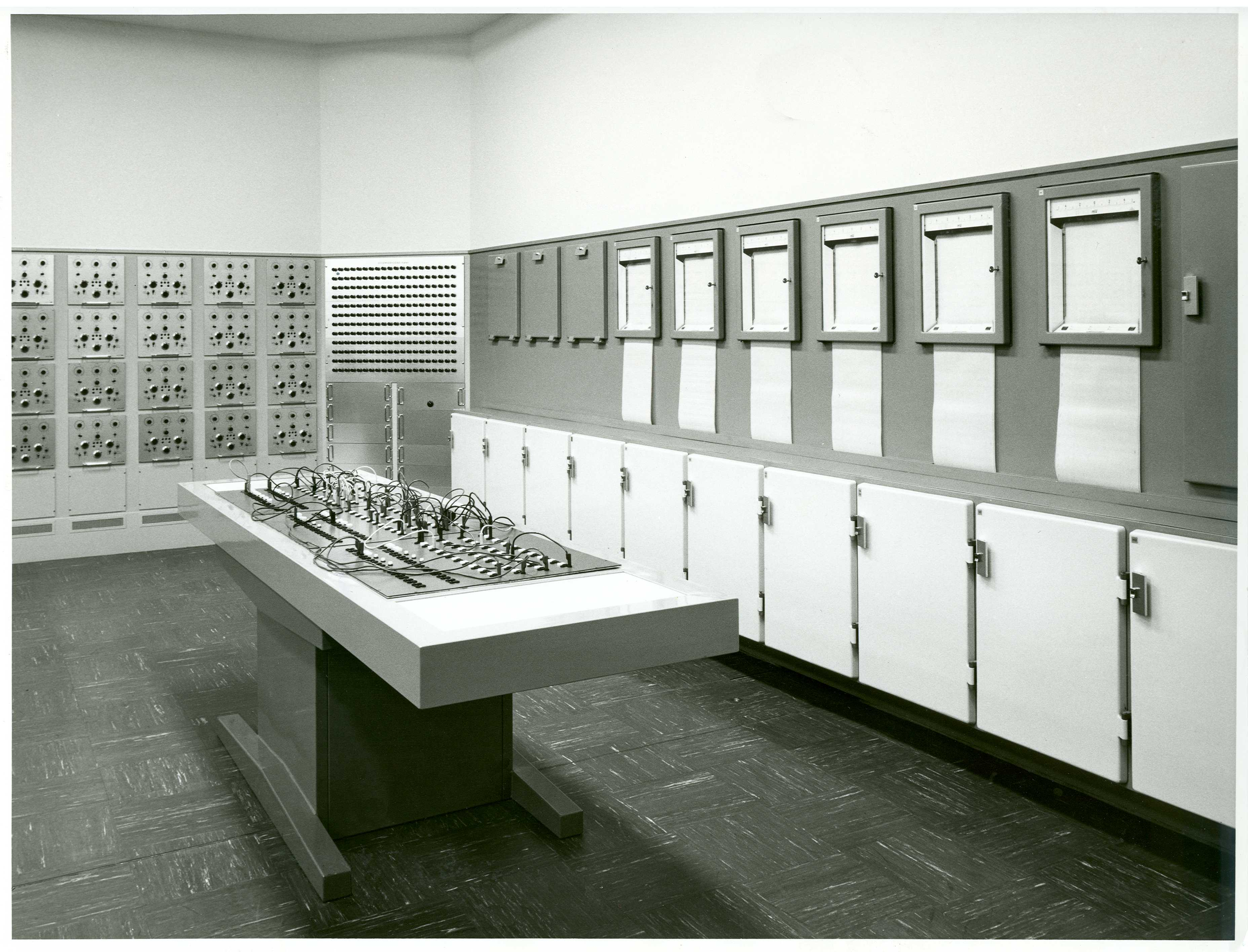
The connection table of the Deltar for the construction of river configurations

The Deltar (Delta Getij Analogon Rekenmachine, English: Delta Tide Analogue Calculator) was an analogue computer used in the design and execution of the Delta Works from 1960 to 1984. Originating with Johan van Veen, who also built the initial prototypes between 1944 and 1946, its development was continued by J.C. Schönfeld and C.M. Verhagen after van Veen's death in 1959.

The Deltar was first put to use in 1960, and was the successor to a previous analogue computer, the larger Electrisch model van waterlopen (English: Electric model of watercourses).

The Deltar was specifically designed and built to perform complex calculations necessary to predict tidal movements and the effects of interventions such as the construction of compartmentalisation dams in the Delta area of the Netherlands. The Deltar's design was based on the hydraulic analogy between the phenomena of water and electricity. Analogous to water level, flow, inertia, and water storage, the design of the computer used electrical phenomena such as voltage, current, self-inductance, and capacitance.

== History ==
Tidal calculations had been a focus of engineering research in the Netherlands for much of the early 20th century. In 1916, Gerard Henri de Vries Broekman had suggested a practical method for the calculation of tidal levels. In 1926, Hendrik Lorentz had developed two methods for the prediction of tidal levels for the Zuiderzee Works.

The methodologies for solving differential equations of tidal motion were continuously researched and improved in the years after this, notably by J.P. Mazure, H.J. Stroband, Jo Johannis Dronkers, H. Holsters, and Johan Christoph (J.C.) Schönfeld.

In the 1930s, Johan van Veen worked on a model to compare tidal currents with electrical currents. Despite initial scepticism about its reliability, van Veen continued to develop his 'electrical method', which he described in an article in the Dutch journal De Ingenieur as a 'simple engineering method' with 'relatively great accuracy'.

His method stood in opposition to the more mathematical methods for tidal calculations, such as those of Dronkers, which required complicated mathematical effort. Dronkers had published several papers on tidal calculations, leading up to his magnum opus, Tidal computations in rivers and coastal waters, in 1964. It remains a benchmark in the field of tidal calculation theory, and led to the award of the Conrad Medal by the Royal Netherlands Institute of Engineers to Dronkers in 1965.

Dronkers' computational approach, though rigorous, was criticised by van Veen for its complexity and computational demands, which he believed could hinder timely practical applications. The Deltar, by comparison, offered a fast and accurate method to undertake tidal calculations.

After the North Sea flood of 1953, the Deltacommissie (English: Delta Commission), led by A.G. Maris, the Director-General of Rijkswaterstaat, was established. This commission was tasked by the Minister of Transport and Water Management to develop plans to prevent such disasters in the future. Although a Delta Plan had been conceived by van Veen before the flood, this event expedited the decision to progress it, with the Dutch coastline to be shortened by approximately 700 kilometres. The scale and complexity of the Delta Works meant that the reduction in calculation time offered by the Deltar, compared with manual calculation methods, would be advantageous.

== System overview ==
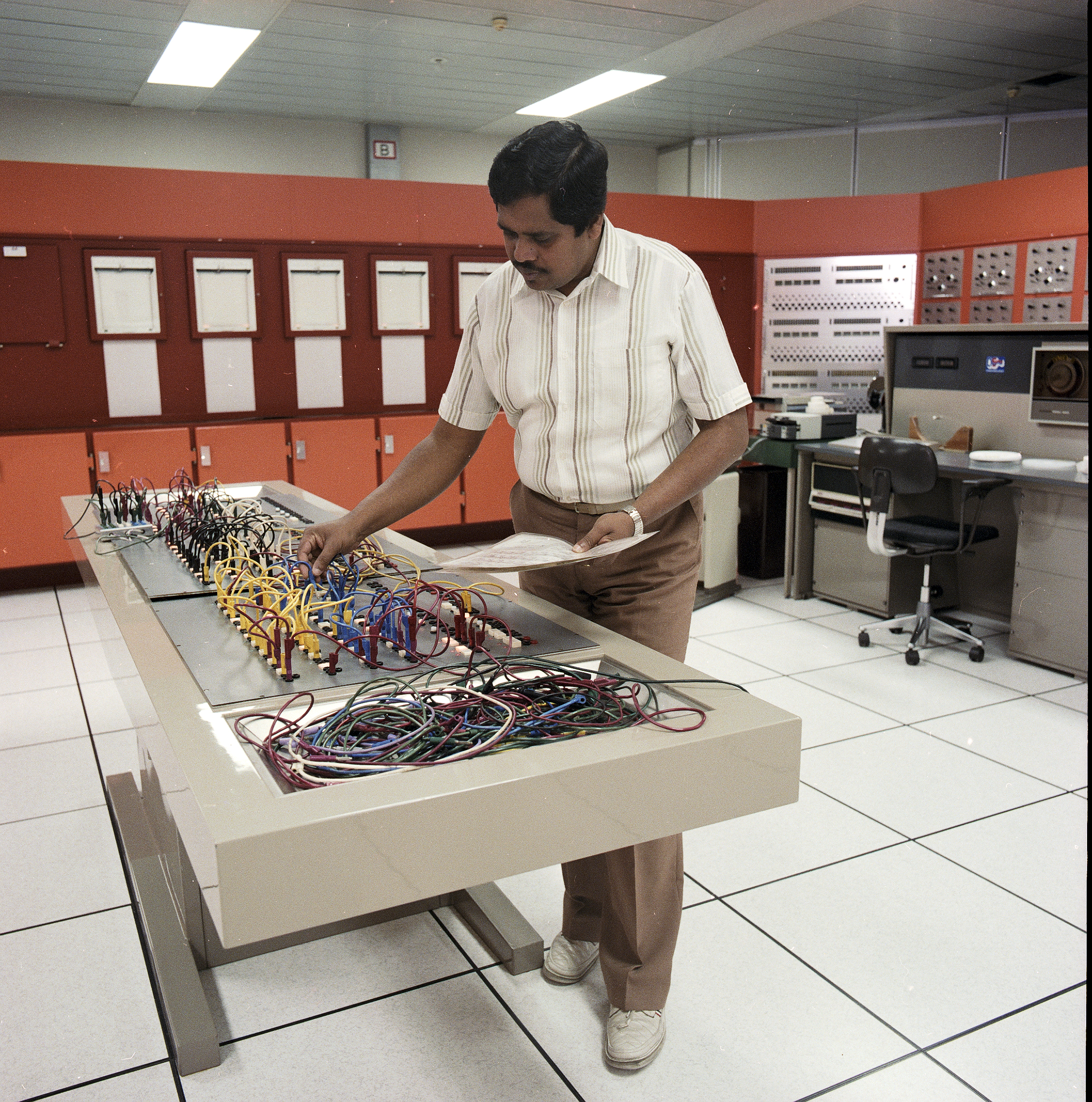
An engineer configuring the connection table on the Deltar (1984)

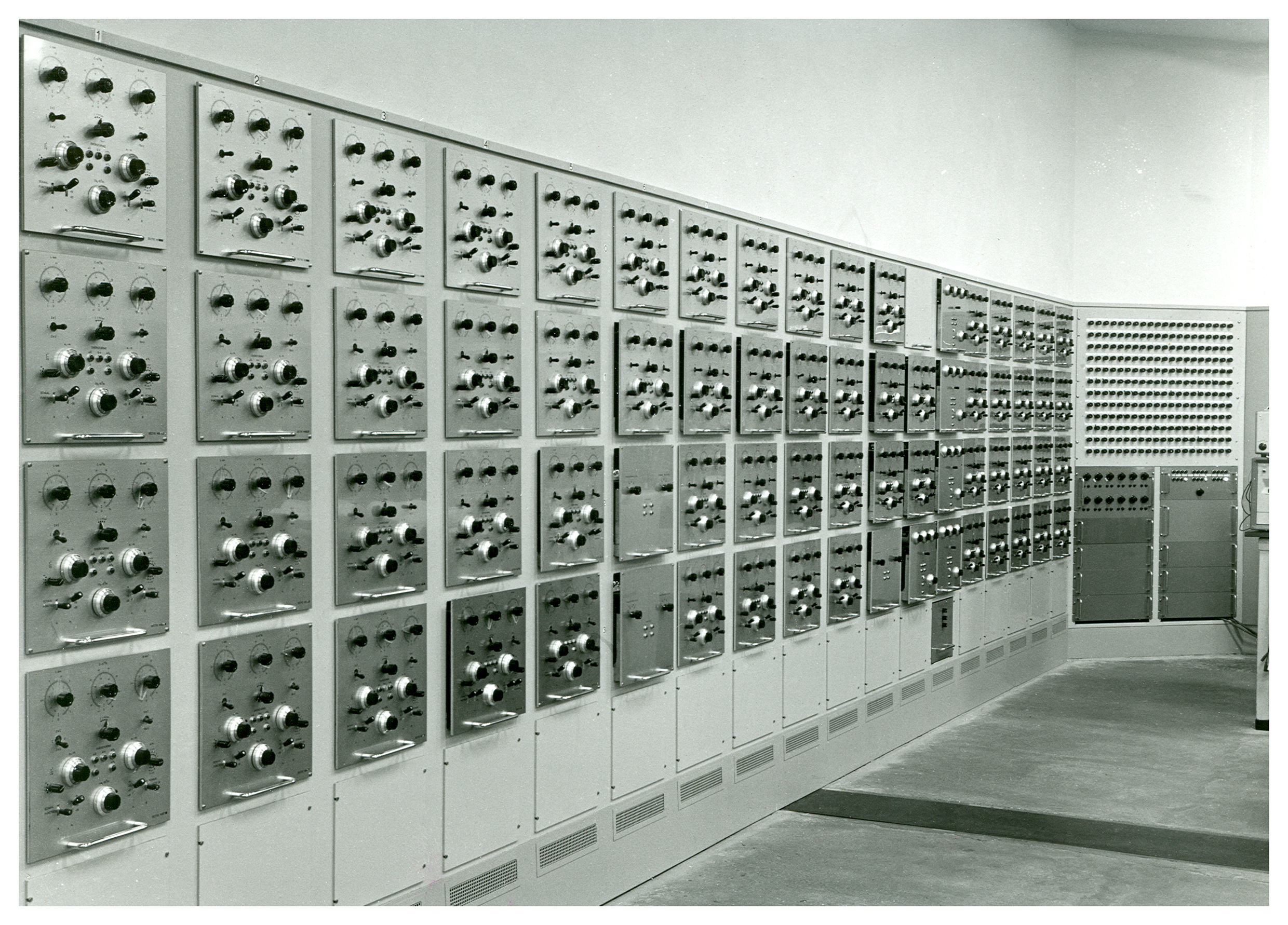
The Deltar's 120 computing modules (1967)

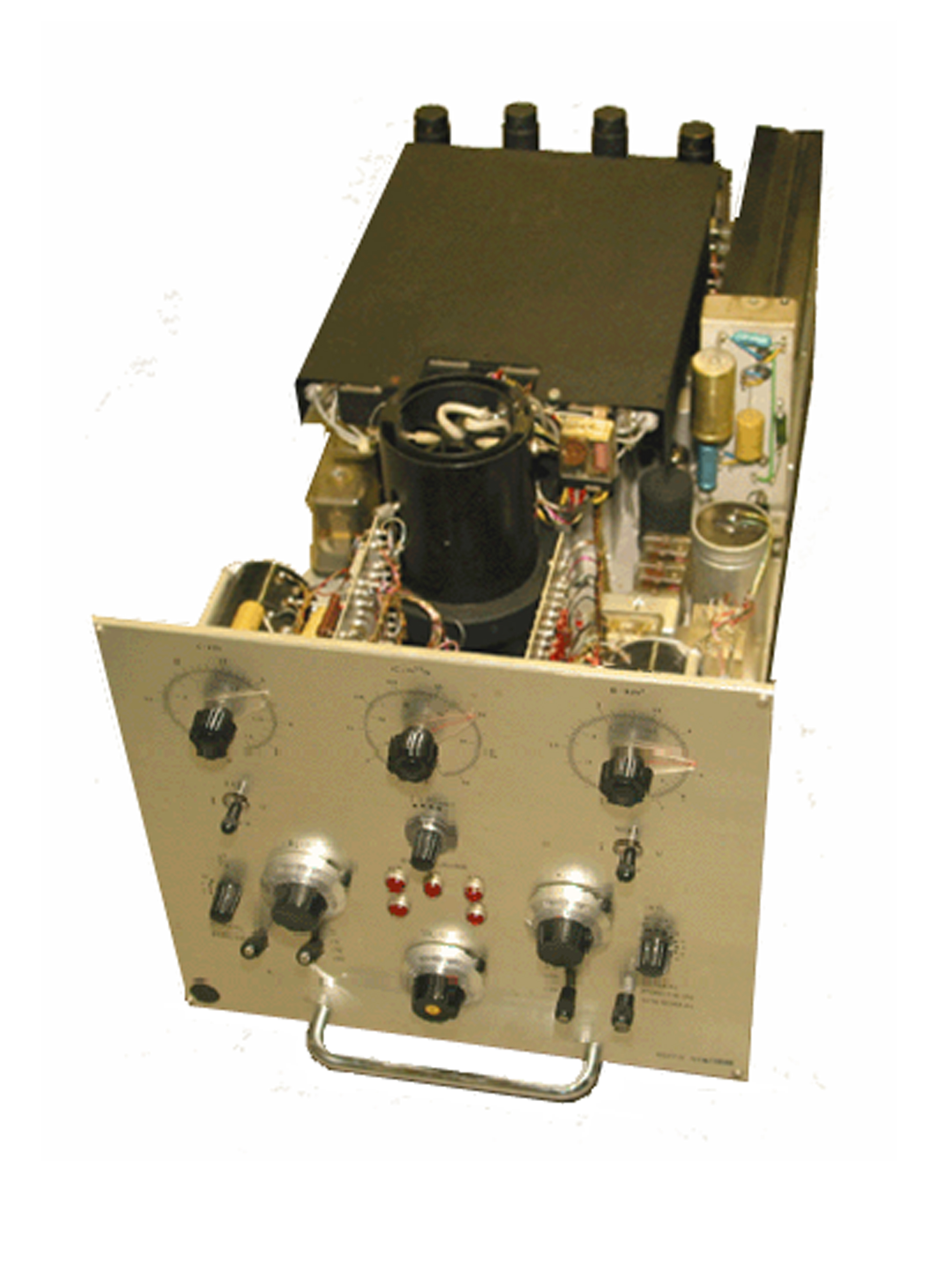
A computing module from the Deltar analogue computer

The Deltar was an advanced system designed for simulating tides and analysing river environments by converting tidal data, river flows, and environmental factors into electrical analogue signals. This approach enabled dynamic modelling of time-varying parameters, which was essential for fluid dynamics simulations in natural settings.

Divided into multiple sections, each corresponding to a distinct part of the studied river system, the Deltar required initial configuration with precise values to simulate each segment accurately. Inputs such as fluctuating tide levels and wind conditions, often encoded on punched tapes, were translated into electrical signals to drive the simulation.

Its output system recorded the resulting data, providing insights into water flow and currents. The Deltar's computing speed was managed via a time-scale setting, balancing computational capacity with the rate of data input and output. Each module of the Deltar represented water flow and levels at both ends of a river segment using electrical currents and voltages. The primary computing elements were the operational amplifiers which continuously solved interconnected first-order differential equations.

The system was organised in three groups of 40 units. Each unit corresponded to a particular section of a river, enabling up to three tidal problems to be investigated simultaneously. The analogue sections were configured so that a river section’s hydraulic properties such as length, width, depth, and resistance coefficient were immediately reflected within the simulation.

The Deltar accommodated both manual and automatic adjustments. Basic settings were entered manually, while changes in water height triggered automatic alterations via servomotor-controlled resistors in each module, ensuring dynamic reflection of changing water levels in the simulation.

A mechanical function generator, driven by a servomotor spindle, was integral to accurately modelling water behaviour in each river segment. The low drift and high common-mode rejection required by the amplifiers were achieved using mirror galvanometer-based designs. Each module contained four such amplifiers and a ECC81 dual triode vacuum tube in the servo circuit. The system was capable of running simulations at up to 100 times real-time speed.

== Computational tasks ==
The Deltar's first major assignment was to study the tidal movement in the North Delta area during and after the execution of the Delta Plan. It was also used for:

- Operational guidance for the closures of the Volkerak (the Volkerakdam), Grevelingen (the Grevelingendam), and the Brouwershavense Gat (the Brouwersdam).
- Research on the occurrence of seiches in the sea ports of Den Helder, IJmuiden, and Scheveningen.
- Investigations into water levels during storm surges along the North Sea Canal and the IJ.
- Studies on water movement on the Hollandse IJssel during various closure manoeuvres with the Stormvloedkering Hollandse IJssel.

== Current status ==
Despite its advanced capabilities, the advent of digital computing, exemplified by the Electrologica X1, soon overshadowed the Deltar's analogue methodology. After 1984, the system was dismantled and almost entirely lost. However, four units are known to have been preserved, three of which are on display at Deltapark Neeltje Jans, and one at the Computer Museum of the University of Amsterdam.

== See also ==
- Delta Works
- Flood control in the Netherlands
- Ishiguro Storm Surge Computer
- Rijkswaterstaat
