= Johan van Veen =

Dutch engineer (1893–1959)

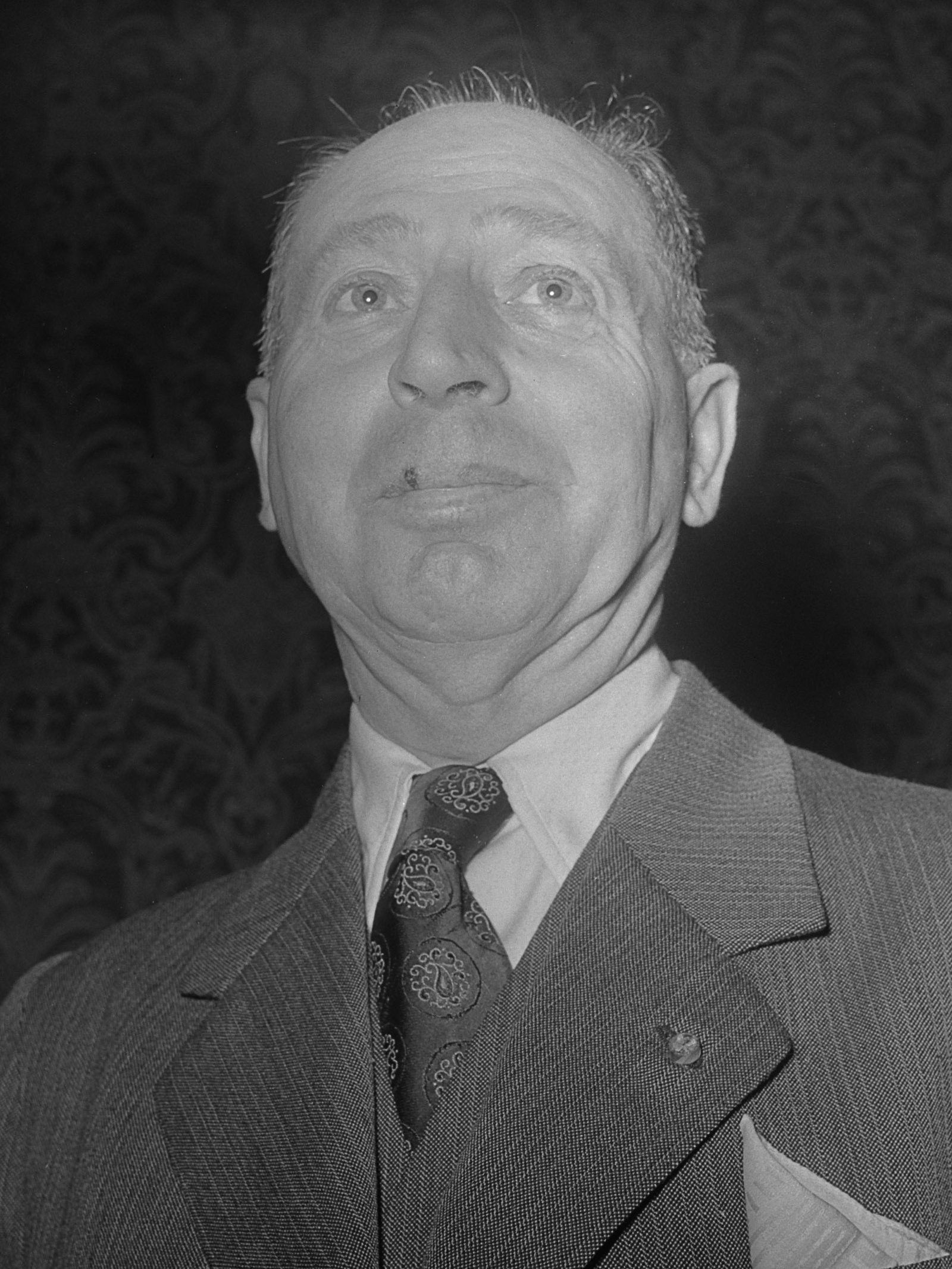
- Johan van Veen (1953)
- Born: 21 December 1893; Uithuizermeeden, Netherlands
- Died: 9 December 1959 (aged 65); The Hague, Netherlands
- Education: Delft University of Technology
- Occupation: Civil engineer
- Employer: Rijkswaterstaat
- Organization: Government
- Notable work: Delta Works

Johan van Veen (Uithuizermeeden, 21 December 1893 – The Hague, 9 December 1959) was a Dutch hydraulic engineer. A graduate of Technische Hoogeschool Delft, he joined Rijkswaterstaat in 1929 and became head of its research department for tidal rivers and estuaries, where he conducted pioneering studies of coastal morphology, storm surges, saltwater intrusion, and tidal hydraulics.

Beginning in the late 1930s, van Veen repeatedly warned that the Netherlands' flood defences were inadequate and advocated large-scale engineering measures, including the closure of vulnerable estuaries and the strengthening of dikes. Although many of his proposals initially received little political support, they gained urgency after the North Sea flood of 1953, when he served as secretary of the state commission charged with developing a long-term flood protection strategy.

Van Veen's ideas formed much of the basis for the Delta Plan and the subsequent Delta Works, for which he is often regarded as the "Father of the Delta Works". He also developed several influential hydraulic engineering innovations, including the van Veen grab sampler, early prototypes of the Deltar computer, methods of tidal modelling based on hydraulic-electrical analogies, and techniques for studying estuarine processes.

== Education ==
Johan van Veen was the fifth child of seven in a farming family. He was the brother of Marie van Veen, married to the artist Johan Dijkstra. In 1913, after high school graduation, he started his studies in Delft at the Technische Hoogeschool van Delft. He studied civil engineering. In 1919, he graduated as "ingenieur" (equivalent to M.Sc. in engineering).

== Provincial Water Authority Drenthe ==
Van Veen worked as an engineer for the Drainage Department of the Provincial Water Authority of the Province of Drenthe. The task of this department was to develop plans to improve the drainage and road structure of the province. In turn, this would enlarge the agricultural yield and to transport the products in a more efficient way to the markets (in the western part of the Netherlands).

During World War I, it became evident that the Netherlands depended too strongly on food products from abroad. The interwar years were focused on agriculture. In order to have solid grounds for such plans, the borders of watersheds were charted, discharge measurements were made and leveling out valleys and the adjacent higher grounds works were executed. Van Veen carried out these studies in cooperation with agricultural engineer F.P. Mesu (who graduated in Wageningen).

== Surinam ==
In 1926, van Veen left the Provincial Water Authority. From August 1926 to October 1928, he worked in Surinam at the Surinaamse Bauxiet Maatschappij (Suriname Bauxite Company), later a subsidiary of Alcoa, in Moengo, Suriname.

== Rijkswaterstaat ==
In 1929, after his return to the Netherlands, van Veen held a position at Rijkswaterstaat (the Executive Agency of the Dutch Ministry of Infrastructure). He became head of the newly created Research Department for Tidal Rivers and Estuaries. His first assignment was to improve the hydraulic conditions at Hellegat, a complicated bifurcation of estuary branches. He also developed a new method to calculate tides, an improvement on the formulas developed by Hendrik Lorentz on the closure of the Zuiderzee. He published his Ph.D. thesis on sand movement in the Strait of Dover (which was relevant for Dutch coastal morphology), based on extensive measurements in that area. He wrote many (Dutch) reports on the coasts, tidal movements, estuaries and salt intrusion.

In the years before and during World War II, van Veen executed many studies on the problem of salt intrusion into tidal rivers. As head of Rijkswaterstaat’s Studiedienst from 1933, he commissioned field measurements from the research vessel De Oceaan to understand currents and sedimentation in the lower rivers and coastal zone. By the late 1930s he was filing reports on the poor state of dikes around places like the Island of Dordrecht, proposing not only higher embankments but also the linking of dike rings and the damming of certain inland waters to protect larger, continuous areas. During the war, he prepared his Verlandingsplan to manipulate tidal rivers in such a way that natural silting-up would take place, and thus make reclamation less challenging. Just after the war, he presented this plan again, with a focus on repairing infrastructure damaged during the war.

== Delta Plan ==
From 1937 onward, van Veen warned about the deplorable condition of the Dutch flood defences. He stipulated that a disaster was imminent, but politically he found no support for his warnings, the main reason being that improvement of dikes would cost a lot of money, which was not available in the Netherlands just after the war (the country depended mainly on money from the Marshall Plan).

In 1939, Pieter Jacobus Wemelsfelder, a colleague of van Veen, published a paper in the journal de Ingenieur (English: The Engineer) that was the first to apply statistical methods to the occurrence of storm surges. His research suggested a shift in design approach, moving away from basing flood design on the highest observed flood level towards designing for a flood with a calculated probability. In the same year, van Veen conducted a factor analysis of storm surges for the first time. His work explored how changes in river run-off, river channel geometry, and sea level rise affected the design flood. Despite these studies focusing on different aspects of storm surges, they arrived at the same conclusion: that the delta region of The Netherlands faced significant dangers. Since 1938, van Veen had been working on plans to mitigate these risks. He proposed constructing a dike ring for four islands, a storm surge barrier in the Lek, and a high ring of dikes around Dordrecht.

In 1940, van Veen was one of the authors of the Voorlopig rapport van de Commissie inzake stormvloeden op de benedenrivieren (English: Preliminary report by the Commission on Storm Surges in the Lower Rivers), which addressed the pressing issue of flood management in the Netherlands' lower river regions. The report identified significant deficiencies in the height of dikes - up to 1 metre in some areas - and highlighted vulnerabilities along critical waterways such as the Hollandse IJssel and the Merwede. The commission provided detailed recommendations, including dike reinforcements, controlled land reclamation, and strategic closures of vulnerable waterways to mitigate the risk of catastrophic flooding.

The report incorporated advanced hydrological and mathematical analyses for its time, examining factors such as astronomical tides, storm surges, high river discharge, and long-term sea level rise, which was projected at 20 centimetres per century. Though the report's findings were not fully acted upon due to the outbreak of World War II, it laid the groundwork for post-war flood management initiatives and presaged the innovative engineering solutions later embodied in the Delta Works. Notably, the report demonstrated van Veen's approach to integrating empirical data with predictive modelling to inform sustainable flood defence strategies.

Van Veen published a book in English on the history of Dutch hydraulic engineering, titled Dredge, Drain, Reclaim: The Art of a Nation. In later editions, van Veen added a chapter under the pseudonym "Dr. Cassandra", using this alias to issue warnings about the pressing flood risks faced by the Netherlands. His final advisory report, dated 29 January 1953, included a comprehensive study of these risks and a detailed plan to mitigate them by closing specific estuaries.

Just days later, the Netherlands was struck by the devastating North Sea flood of 1 February 1953, the worst storm surge in the country's history. In the aftermath of the disaster, a State Commission was established on 18 February 1953, with Johan van Veen appointed as its Secretary.

By May 1953, the commission released its first interim report, urgently recommending the closure of the Hollandse IJssel with a storm surge barrier and the implementation of van Veen’s plan to close the estuaries, which later became the basis for the Delta Works. This ambitious programme of flood defences was eventually realised. The commission's final report was published in 1960, a year after Van Veen’s death. As a result, van Veen is remembered as the "Father of the Delta Plan" in the Netherlands and as the "Master of the Floods" in England.

In the years after 1953, van Veen continued to be deeply engaged in hydraulic engineering advocacy. He argued that expanding Rotterdam’s harbour at Pernis and Rozenburg would require deepening waterways, raising riverine high-water levels and worsening salt intrusion. As an alternative, van Veen urged the construction of an offshore scheme on the coastal sandbanks (which would later be realised as the Maasvlakte). However political pushback, including from the mayor of Rotterdam, meant that his advice was not acted upon during his lifetime.

== Inventions ==
Johan van Veen has a number of inventions to his name. Notable is the Van Veen Grab Sampler, a device to take (disturbed) bed samples from the seabed (around 1930). He is also the inventor of the pneumatic barrier to prevent salt intrusion (around 1940). In 1930, he proved the analogy between electricity and water flow. From this principle he developed an analog computer to calculate tidal flow (electric analogon). In the period 1944-1956 it had become operational. Later on this machine was updated and became the practical computer to calculate tidal flow and water levels in the Dutch Delta to predict the effect of closure works, the Delta Works. This analog computer now bears the name Deltar.

== Personal life and death ==
On May 5, 1927, van Veen married Hendrika ("Henny") Aalfs during his stay in Suriname. They had three children. Unfortunately, their marriage was not very happy. Although he came from a Dutch Reformed Church family, he converted to Christian Science until 1937, following his sister Anna, who lived in the United States.

Van Veen suffered from a number of heart attacks, the first one in 1937 and later in 1948 a heavy one after his "four-island-plan" was rejected. In 1959 he had his last, fatal attack in the train when on his way to a meeting regarding his plan of a new harbour near Delfzijl, the Eemshaven.

== Awards and recognition ==
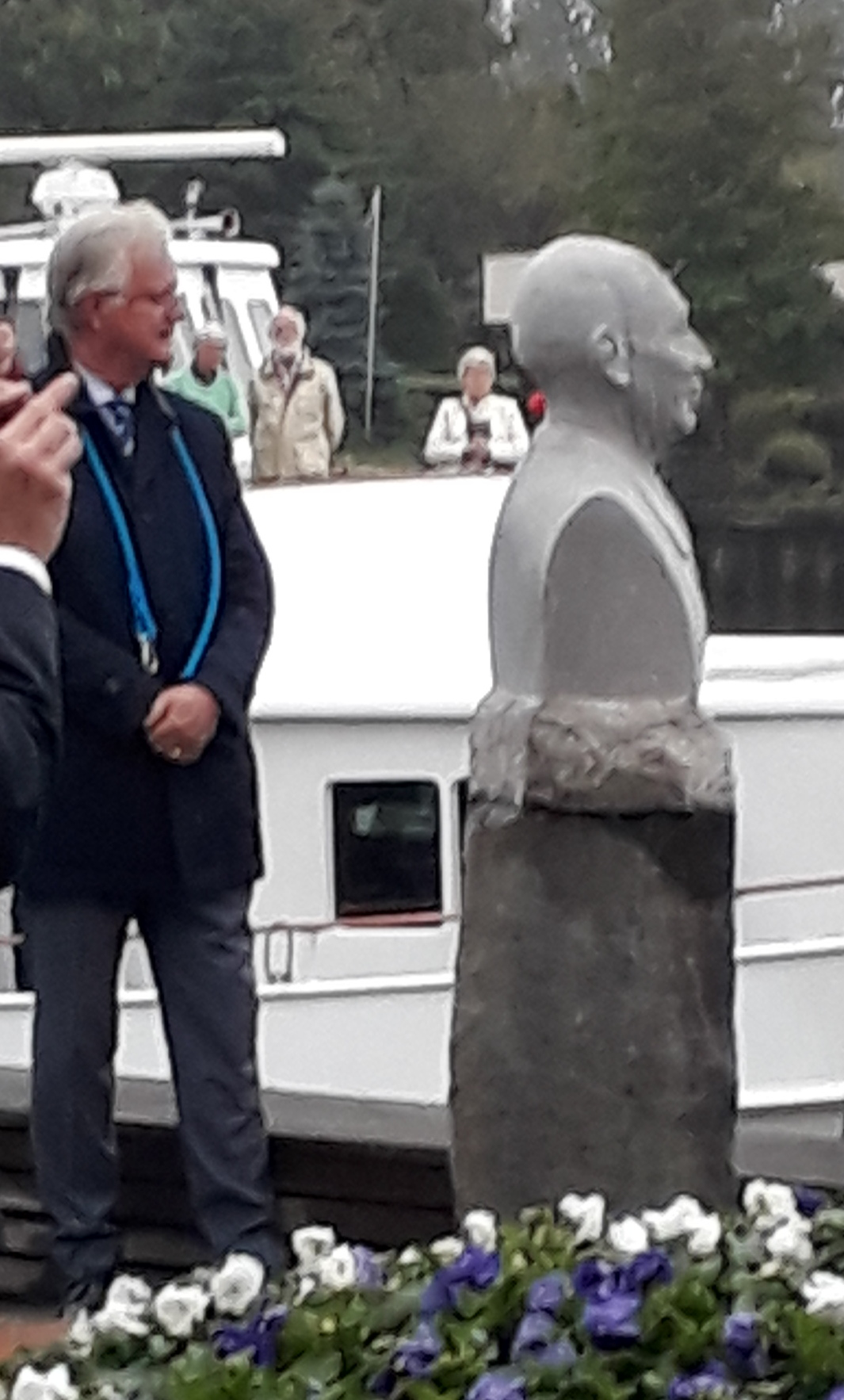
Unveiling of a statue of van Veen in Capelle aan den IJssel in 2020.

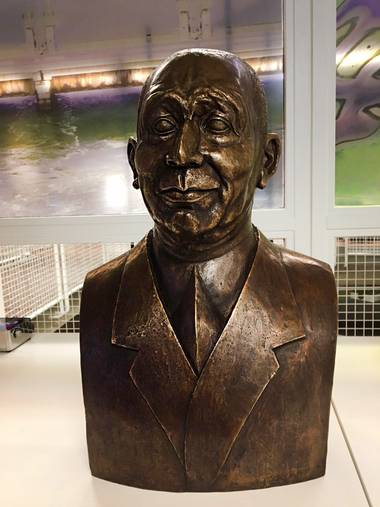
Bronze bust of Johan van Veen by Fred Hartog

In 2020, the Stichting Blauwe Lijn organisation unveiled a statue of van Veen in Capelle aan den IJssel. The central square in van Veen's birthplace of Uithuizermeeden is named for him, and a bust of him was erected there in 1979. The character Joost van Ven in the debut novel 1953 by Rik Launspach was inspired by van Veen, with the novel subsequently being adapted into the 2009 film The Storm.

Van Veen was recognised with a number of awards, both during his lifetime and posthumously, including:

- 1936: Awarded the Golden Medal (Gouden erepenning) of the Bataafs Genootschap for his dissertation Onderzoekingen in de Hoofden (Investigations in the Straits of Dover).
- 1950: Appointed Officer in the Order of Orange-Nassau.
- 1954: Appointed Knight First Class in the Norwegian Order of St. Olav.
- 1956: Granted honorary membership of the Utrecht student corps.
- 1958: Appointed Knight in the Order of the Netherlands Lion.
- 2017: Included in the Alumni Walk of Fame of the TU Delft as the founder of the Delta Works.

== Bibliography ==
=== A selection of important publications by van Veen (in Dutch) ===
Many of van Veen's publications can be viewed at the Van Veen-Stroband Archive Netherlands National Archives. A list of all his publications (mainly in Dutch) is available at the Tresor of Dutch Hydraulic Engineering.

Some key publications by Johan van Veen
Date of Publication	Original Language Title	English Translation	Brief Description	Citation
1929	Nota betreffende de noodzakelijkheid van een systematisch onderzoek van de Westerschelde	Note on the Necessity of Systematic Research on the Western Scheldt	Emphasizes the importance of systematic research for understanding and managing the Western Scheldt.	Nota betreffende de noodzakelijkheid van een systematisch onderzoek van de Westerschelde [Note on the Necessity of Systematic Research on the Western Scheldt] (PDF) (in Dutch). 1929.
1930	De Fivel en hare verzanding	The Fivel and Its Silting	Investigates the silting of the Fivel River, based on notes by P.M. Bos.	De Fivel en hare verzanding [The Fivel and Its Silting] (in Dutch). Tijdschrift KNAG, Deel 47, Afl. 4/5. 1930.
1931	Verslag van waarnemingen in het Hellegat	Report of Observations in the Hellegat	Details studies and observations in the Hellegat, including storm surge effects.	Verslag van waarnemingen in het Hellegat, inclusief studie naar effect stormvloeden [Report of Observations in the Hellegat] (PDF) (in Dutch). 1931.
1933	Onderzoek naar zandtransport in rivieren	Research on Sand Transport in Rivers	Explores sediment transport in rivers and its implications for hydraulic engineering.	"Onderzoek naar zandtransport in rivieren" [Research on Sand Transport in Rivers]. De Ingenieur (in Dutch). 48 (27). 1933-07-07.
1935	Nota betreffende eene getijberekening voor den verbeterden Hollandsche IJssel	Note Concerning a Tidal Analysis for the Improved Hollandse IJssel	Discusses tidal calculations for flood defense improvements.	Nota betreffende eene getijberekening voor den verbeterden Hollandsche IJssel [Note Regarding a Tidal Calculation for the Improved Hollandsche IJssel] (in Dutch). RWS Benedenrivieren. 1935.
1936	Onderzoekingen in de Hoofden in verband met de gesteldheid der Nederlandsche kust	Investigations in the Hoofden (the Strait of Dover) in Relation to the State of the Dutch Coast	Examines the morphology of the Dutch coast; based on van Veen’s dissertation.	Van Veen, J. (1936). Onderzoekingen in de Hoofden in verband met de gesteldheid der Nederlandsche kust [Investigations in the Hoofden Related to the Condition of the Dutch Coast] (in Dutch). RWS Benedenrivieren.
1936	Beoordeling van nota Wemelsfelder	Assessment of Wemelsfelder's Note	Evaluates Pieter Jacobus Wemelsfelder's research on horizontal water movements.	Beoordeling van nota Wemelsfelder [Assessment of Wemelsfelder's Note] (PDF) (in Dutch). RWS Benedenrivieren. 1936.
1937	Waarnemingen omtrent de snelheidsverdeling in een verticaal	Observations on Velocity Distribution in a Vertical Profile	Examines the distribution of water current speeds in vertical sections.	Van Veen, J. (1937). Waarnemingen omtrent de snelheidsverdeling in een verticaal [Observations on the Speed Distribution in a Vertical] (in Dutch). RWS Benedenrivieren.
1937	Nota betreffende de afdamming der Brielsche Maas	Note Regarding the Damming of the Brielsche Maas	Discusses plans for damming the Brielsche Maas to improve flood defences.	Nota betreffende de afdamming der Brielsche Maas [Note Regarding the Damming of the Brielsche Maas] (in Dutch). RWS Benedenrivieren. 1937.
1938	Te verwachten stormvloedstanden op de benedenrivieren	Expected Storm Surge Levels on the Lower Rivers	Analyzes factors influencing storm surges, emphasizing the dangers to the Dutch delta region.	Te verwachten stormvloedstanden op de benedenrivieren : eerste voorlopige becijfering [Expected Storm Surge Levels on the Lower Rivers] (in Dutch). RWS Benedenrivieren. 1938.
1939	Nota betreffende de verdeling van het Rijnwater in droge tijden	Note on the Distribution of Rhine Water During Droughts	Studies water distribution during periods of low river discharge.	Van Veen, J. (1939). Nota betreffende de verdeling van het Rijnwater in droge tijden [Note on the Distribution of Rhine Water During Droughts] (in Dutch). RWS Benedenrivieren.
1939	Korte opmerkingen over de kritiek van Prof. Thijsse op het voorlopig rapport van de Stormvloed-commissie	Brief Remarks on Professor Thijsse's Criticism of the Preliminary Report of the Storm Surge Committee	Responds to Jo Thijsse's critique of flood defence proposals.	Van Veen, J. (1939). Korte opmerkingen over de kritiek van Prof. Thijsse op het voorlopig rapport van de Stormvloed-commissie [Brief Remarks on Professor Thijsse's Criticism] (in Dutch). RWS Benedenrivieren.
1940	Voorlopig rapport van de Commissie inzake stormvloeden op de benedenrivieren	Preliminary Report by the Commission on Storm Surges in the Lower Rivers	Addresses deficiencies in dikes and proposes innovative flood defense strategies.	Heyst, D. A.; Kempees, A. E.; Rulkens, J. W.; Schlingemann, F. L.; Schönfeld, J. F.; Versteeg, H.; Van Veen, J. (1940). Voorlopig rapport van de Commissie inzake stormvloeden op de benedenrivieren [Preliminary Report by the Commission on Storm Surges in the Lower Rivers] (in Dutch). RWS Benedenrivieren.
1942	Voorlopige Nota betreffende Verlandingsmogelijkheden in de Zuidwestelijke en Noordelijke Wateren van Nederland	Preliminary Note on Land Reclamation Possibilities in the Southwestern and Northern Waters of the Netherlands	Proposes natural reclamation methods for coastal areas.	Van Veen, J. (1942). Voorlopige Nota betreffende Verlandingsmogelijkheden in de Zuidwestelijke en Noordelijke Wateren van Nederland [Preliminary Note on Land Reclamation Possibilities] (in Dutch). RWS Benedenrivieren.
1944	Schelderegiem en Schelderegie	The Hydrological Regime and Regulation of the Scheldt	Examines the hydraulic and economic aspects of the Scheldt River.	Schelderegiem en Schelderegie [The Regime and Management of the Scheldt] (PDF) (in Dutch). RWS Benedenrivieren. 1944.

=== English-language publications by van Veen ===
- Sand waves in the North Sea Hydrographic review, Vol. XII, No. 1 (May 1935)
- Measurements in the Straits of Dover, and their relation to the Netherlands coasts (1935) PhD thesis Utrecht University
- Water movements in the Straits of Dover J. of Marine Research Vol. 13, no. 1 (1938); p. 7-36
- The analogy between tides and electrical currents Rijkswaterstaat BER037,
- Analogy between Tides and A.C. Electricity The Engineer, dec 1947 (pp 498, 520. 544)
- Research of Tidal Rivers in the Netherlands: a successful combination of theory and practice Dock & Harbour Authority, Vol. 27, Nos. 313 and 314, November and December 1946
- Estimates of tidal currents in The Panama Canal Zone (1947).
- The calculation of tides in new channels Transactions American Geophysical Union, 1947, Volume 28, Issue 6
- Dredge, Drain Reclaim (5th edition, 1960) Martinus Nijhof
- Ebb and flood channel systems in the Dutch tidal waters Bilingual version of a paper published in 1950 in the Journal of the Dutch Geographic VII. 67, 1950, 303-325
- Tidal Gullies in youngest peat layer of Groningen Proc. Int. Congress Sedimentology, Netherlands (1951) pp. 257–266
- Coasts, estuaries and tidal hydraulics Chapter from the "Civil Engineering Reference Book", edited by E.H. Probst and J. Comrie 1951 (pp1071–1106)
- English and Dutch methods of shore protection (correspondence on an article with R.R. Minikin) The Dock and Harour Authority, May–June 1952
- discussion on: "Application to an hydraulic problem" (by Glover, Herbert & Daum) transactions ASCE,1953 vol 118, pp1010–1028
- Land below sea level : Holland in its age-long fight against the waters 1953 Boucher, The Hague
- Tide-gauges, subsidence-gauges and floodstones in the Netherlands Geologie en Mijnbouw, 1954 (16) pp 214–219 (Symposium quaternary changes in level, especially in the Netherlands)
- Development of marine plains, penetration of sea water in Dutch tidal rivers and inland waters 1957 Pub. 38 IAHR conf Rome (111)
- Necessity of subsidence-gauges Publ. Dutch Geodetic Society for the UGGI congress 1957
- The Rotterdam waterway considered as a rivermouth "De Ingienieur, 1958, nr 28

=== Publications about van Veen ===
- Van der Ham, Willem (2020). Johan van Veen, meester van de zee: Grondlegger van het Deltaplan [Johan van Veen, Master of the Sea: Founder of the Delta Plan] (in Dutch). Boom. ISBN 9789024433919.
- Rooijendijk, Cordula (2009). Waterwolven: Een geschiedenis van stormvloeden, dijkenbouwers en droogmakers [Waterwolves: A History of Storm Surges, Dike Builders, and Reclaimers] (in Dutch). Uitgeverij Atlas. ISBN 9789046703380.
- Bregman, Rutger (2020). Het water komt [The Water is Coming] (in Dutch). De Correspondent. ISBN 9789083017761.
- "Boekbespreking van 'Meester van de Zee', Johan van Veen, waterstaatsingenieur 1893–1959" [Book Review of 'Master of the Sea', Johan van Veen, Hydraulic Engineer 1893–1959]. Delft Integraal (in Dutch). Archived from the original on 1 March 2008.
- "Boekbespreking van 'Meester van de Zee' bij het Historisch Huis" [Book Review of 'Master of the Sea' at Historisch Huis] (in Dutch).
- "Biografie van Johan van Veen in Tijdschrift voor Waterstaatgeschiedenis" [Biography of Johan van Veen in the Journal of Water Management History] (PDF). Tijdschrift voor Waterstaatgeschiedenis (in Dutch).
- "Biografie van Johan van Veen bij de KNAW" [Biography of Johan van Veen at the Royal Netherlands Academy of Arts and Sciences] (in Dutch). 12 November 2013.
