= Volkerakdam =

Hydraulic engineering structures in the Netherlands

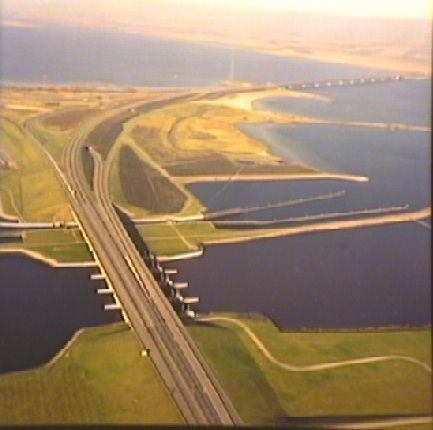
- The Volkerak locks and the Haringvliet Bridge; Volkerakdam
- Coordinates: 51°41′25.1″N 4°24′20.1″E
- Carries: A29, A59
- Crosses: Haringvliet
- Owner: Rijkswaterstaat

Characteristics
- Total length: 9.7 kilometres (6.0 mi) (all 3 structures)

History
- Architect: Staatsbosbeheer (landscape architecture)
- Engineering design by: Deltadienst
- Constructed by: A number of contractors from the table below, including joint ventures
- Construction start: 1957
- Construction end: 1977
- Opened: 1969

The Volkerakdam (English: Volkerak Dam) or Volkerakwerken (Volkerak Works) is the name given to a group of hydraulic engineering structures between Goeree-Overflakkee and North Brabant in the Netherlands. The works are not a single dam, but are composed of three distinct structures: a dam between Goeree-Overflakkee and Hellegatsplein, a series of locks from Hellegatsplein to North Brabant, and a bridge from Hellegatsplein to Hoekse Waard. The works cross three separate bodies of water: the Haringvliet, Hollands Diep and Volkerak. The works together comprise the fifth project of the Delta Works.

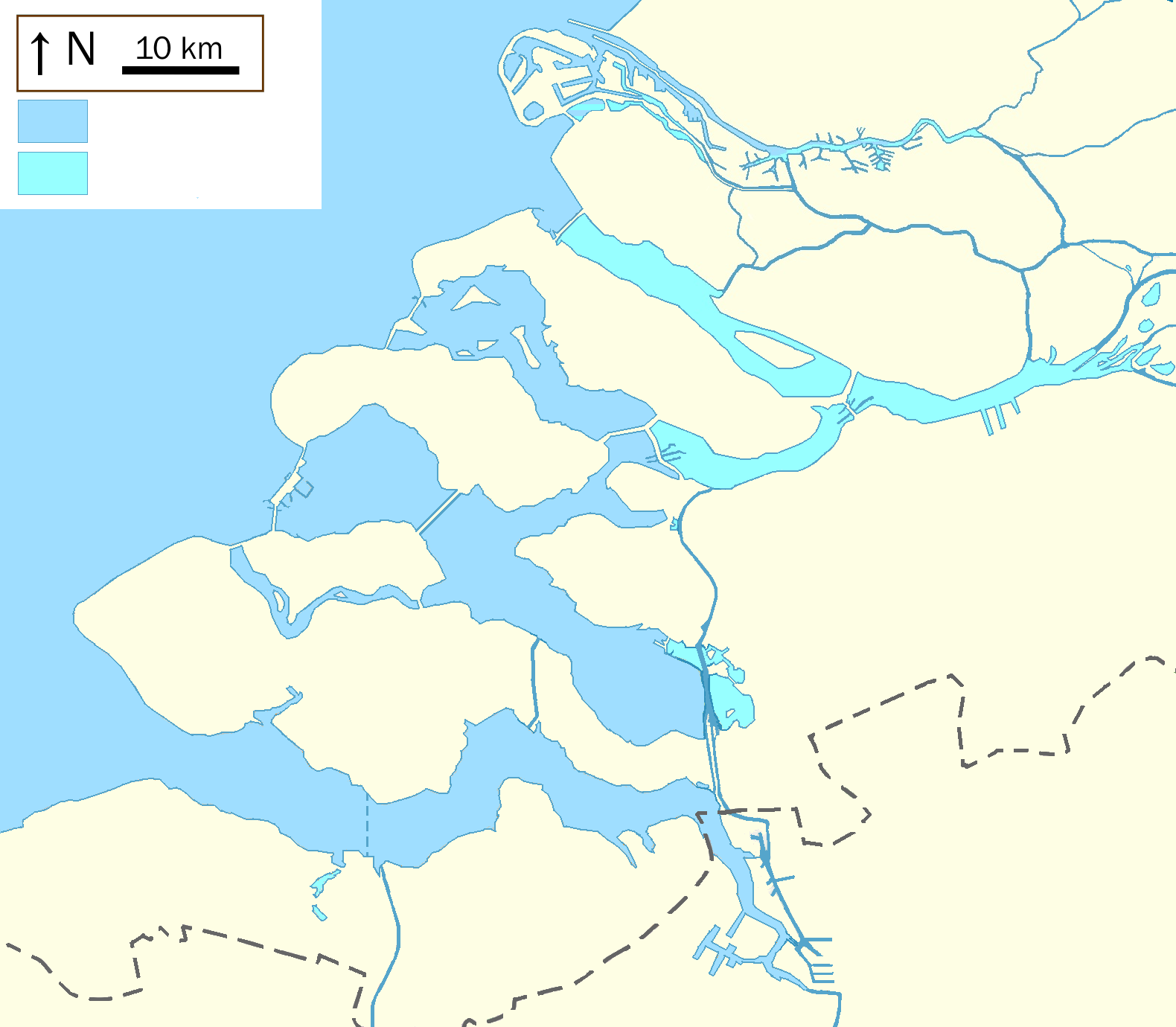
Delta Works

The works were conceived in response to the North Sea flood of 1953, as a result of which it was decided to close the inlets in Zeeland and South Holland. The committee which oversaw the Delta Works concluded that it was necessary to construct two compartmentalisation dams, the Grevelingendam and the Volkerakdam, to close the inlets. It was also deemed necessary to separate the Haringvliet from the waters to the south, to ensure the transport of drift ice from the Hollands Diep to the sea, and to keep the water quality of the (planned) Zeeland Lake acceptable, preserving it from contaminated Rhine water.

In addition, a fixed water level on the Zeeland Lake was desirable for the purpose of shipping between Antwerp and Rotterdam, as the water level on the Haringvliet would vary due to the varying discharge of the Rhine. The construction of the Volkerakdam modified tidal movements across the entire area of the lower rivers, with extensive calculations made using the Deltar analogue computer to analyse these tidal variations.

The Volkerakdam has a supporting environmental function with regard to the primary dams of the Oosterscheldekering, the Brouwersdam and the Haringvlietdam, controlling volumes of freshwater from the Maas and the Waal which enter the waters around Zeeland. As a result of the closure of the Volkerak, the volume of fresh Rhine water entering the estuary decreased. Consequently, the salinity of the Oosterschelde remained relatively constant, increasing the ecological value of the estuary.

The Volkerakdam works also removed the difficulties experienced by shipping from the limited (but very unpredictable) tidal currents in the Hellegat, which had previously resulted in many ships being lost.

== Feasibility, planning and design ==
The shipping channel which formed the connection between the Hollands Diep and Volkerak was noted for the complex and unpredictable nature of tidal currents and the presence of dangerous shoals in the area of the Hellegat (English: Hellhole), which had led to a number of incidents with shipping navigating between Rotterdam and Antwerp.

Johan van Veen made extensive studies of the Volkerak with a view to improving the situation, and in 1929 he came up with a solution in the form of guiding dams. Van Veen's work was successfully completed in 1931, and along with increasing the safety for navigation in the area, the works and his extensive studies provided significant detailed information essential for the design of the Volkerakdam over twenty years later.

The work started by van Veen continued with an extensive study of the tidal movements and associated phenomena such as sediment transport, tidal channels and detailed bathymetry being made over a number of years, with the objectives of increasing safety from storm surges and providing protection against saltwater intrusion from the sea.

The body responsible for design of the overall Delta Works scheme, known as The Delta Works Committee (Deltacommissie), had originally proposed to dam the Volkerak at the level of the Dintel river, and selected the location of the works in a more southerly location than the present position, with a shorter dam. During initial feasibility studies, the advantages of moving the works northward with a bridge crossing between Hellegatsplein and Hoekse Waard were identified, resulting in a decision to build the works in the present location.

Due to the potential effects of the works on shipping between Antwerp and Rotterdam, the authorities in Belgium were involved in the development of the design. The increased cost of the resulting longer dam was mitigated by the fact that the more northerly location facilitated construction at a much reduced water depth.

=== Effects on tidal behaviour ===
As was the case with two other Delta Works projects, the Grevelingendam and the Zandkreekdam, the Volkerakdam was designed as a secondary compartmentalisation dam, with the goal of reducing tidal current velocities in four surrounding estuaries to allow subsequent construction of primary dams.

The effects of the construction of the Volkerakdam on tide levels in the area of the lower rivers has been identified at several locations around adjacent water bodies, as shown in the table and graph below. The changes to the tidal range were dependent on the direction and distance from the dam to the station location. In areas south of the dam, the tidal range increased considerably, whereas in areas on the north side the tidal range decreased. Towards Rotterdam, the influence of the Volkerakdam closure on tides became smaller.

Although the tide could still penetrate the Biesbosch through the Haringvliet and the Rotterdam Waterway immediately after the construction of the dam, the works nonetheless had a considerable immediate effect. The tide on the Oosterschelde side of the dam increased, the high water at Tiengemeten and Willemstad dropped by 30 centimetres, with the difference becoming smaller along the Dordtsche Kil and the Noord. However, in the Biesbosch (Mouth of the Donge and Werkendam/Bakkerskil), the tidal range has been significantly reduced.

Changes to the high tide level (in metres) above Amsterdam Ordnance Datum (NAP) as a result of the Volkerakdam closure
No.	Station/Place	Level before closure	Level after closure
1	Hook of Holland	0.90	0.90
2	Vlaardingen	1.02	0.97
3	Hellevoetsluis	1.06	0.99
4	Rotterdam	1.11	1.03
5	Goidschalxoord	1.17	1.06
6	Stad aan 't Haringvliet	1.18	0.97
7	Krimpen aan de Lek	1.20	1.08
8	Puttershoek	1.26	1.06
9	Tiengemeten	1.29	0.97
10	Willemstad	1.29	0.97
11	Dordrecht	1.31	1.11
12	Moerdijk	1.33	1.08
13	Mouth of the Donge	1.35	1.12
14	Hellegat (South)	1.36	1.90
15	Werkendam (1) – Merwede River	1.39	1.15
16	Dintelsas, Steenbergen	1.40	1.85
17	Bruinisse	1.42	1.65
18	Steenbergse Sas	1.45	1.80
19	Stavenisse	1.54	1.56
20	Werkendam (2)	1.59	1.34

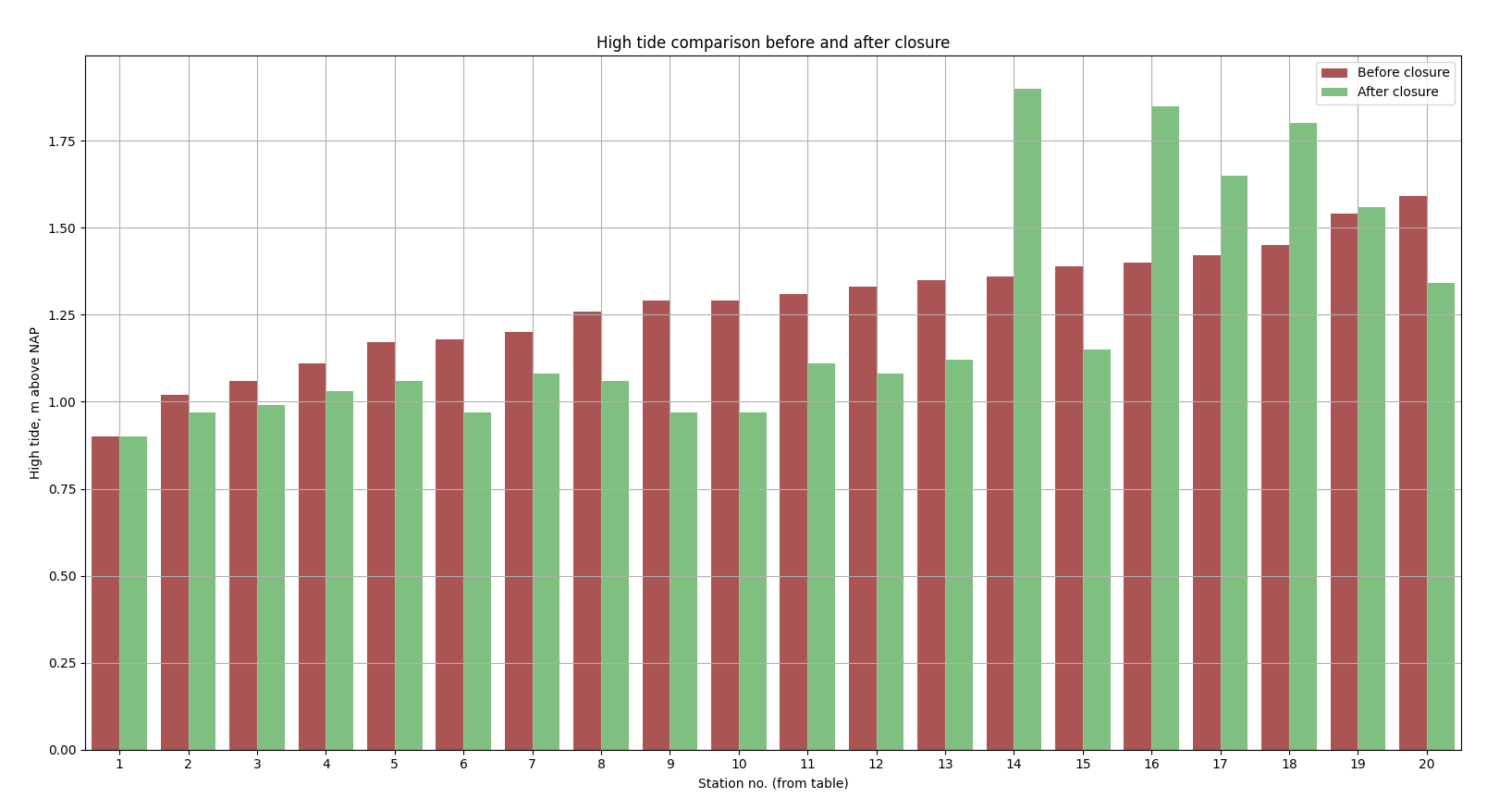
Graph showing changes in high tide level after the closure of the Volkerakdam

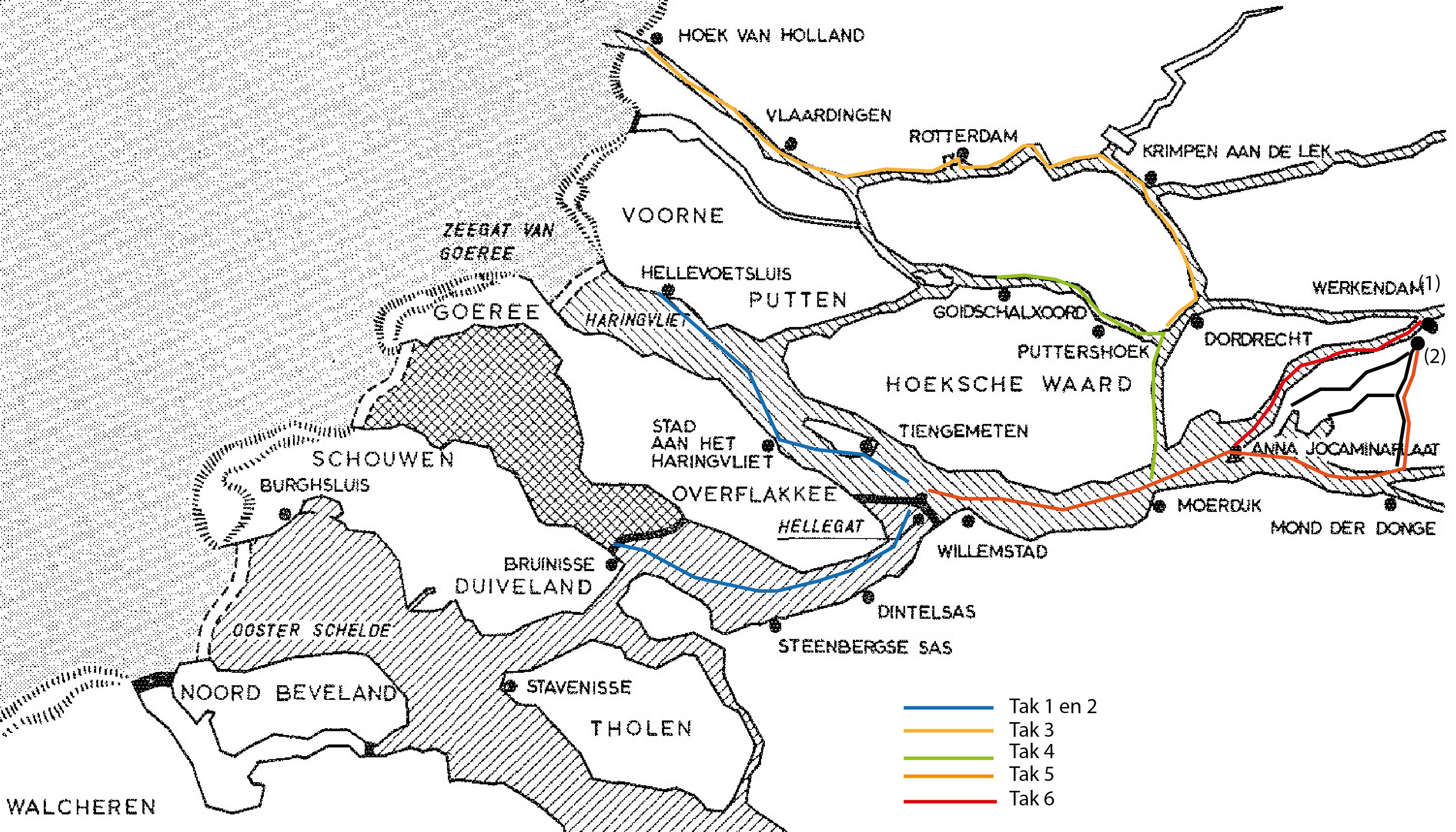
Location of the tidal gauge stations referred to in the table

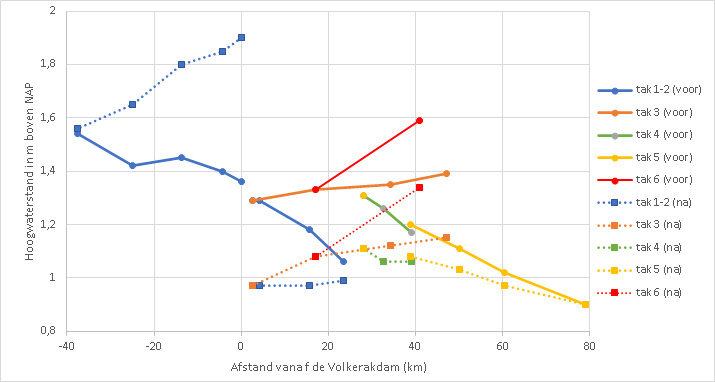
The change in high water levels resulting from the construction of the Volkerakdam

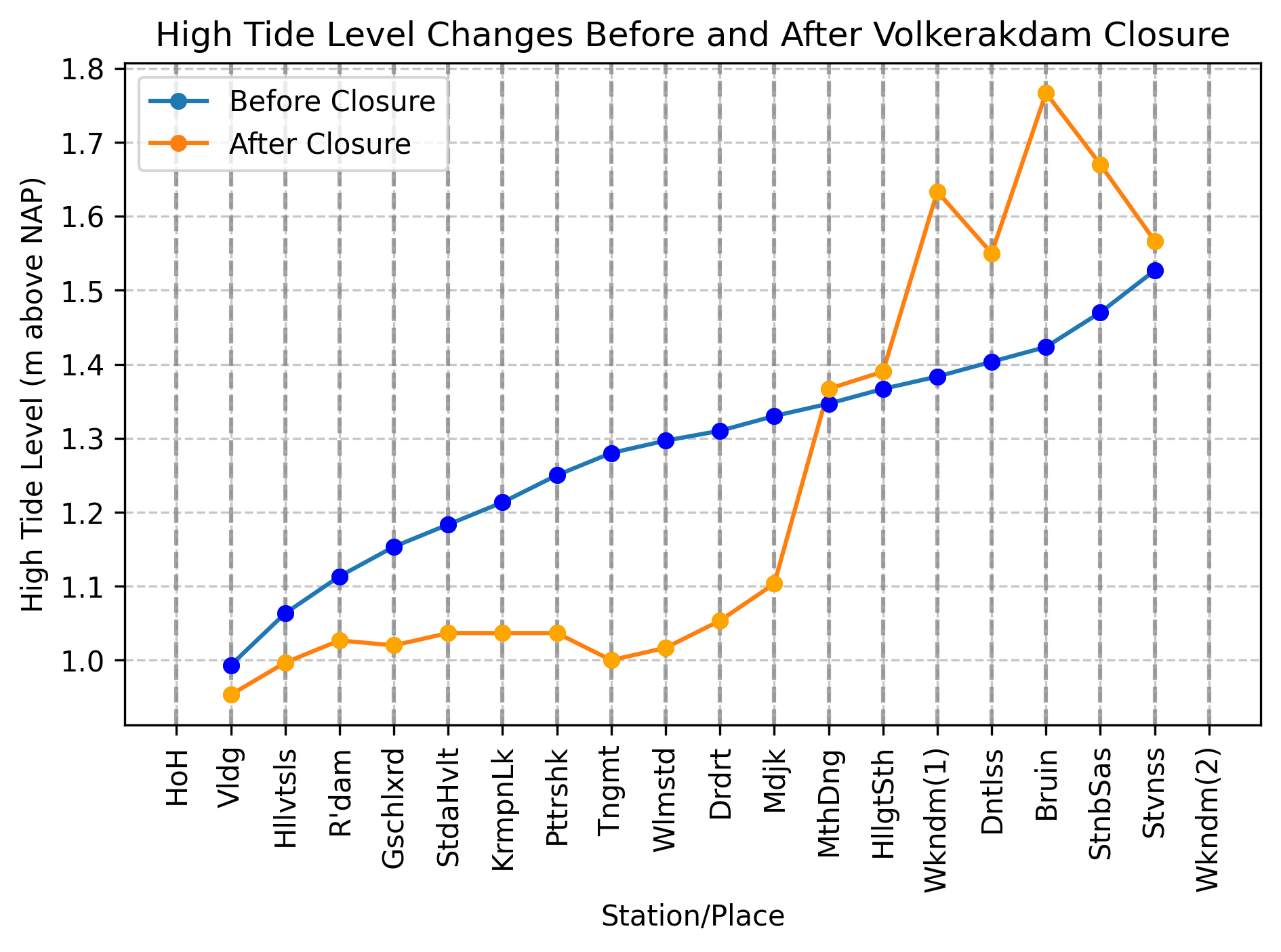
Changes to tidal levels after the closure of the Volkerak

The design of the abutment caissons was undertaken to minimise scour downstream of the dam, arising from vortices generated by the large vertical head above the sill of the structure. The solution adopted was the use of specially adapted caisson units for the abutment ends, with a sloping bottom to fill the triangular void between the first caisson and the slope underneath, ensuring a good fit. The installation of these special units could be undertaken in a matter of days, therefore reducing the amount of time in which large currents were permitted to flow underneath the gradually closing hole, and limiting the potential for scour.

== Construction ==
The project was constructed in stages between 1957 and 1977. By 1969, the dam works were complete, however Rijkswaterstaat then added a third lock and a sluice which took the overall project completion date through until 1977. The section of the works located between the Hellegatsplein and North Brabant is composed of a solid dam, made up of 14 caissons in combination with locks, providing the ability for shipping to pass between Rotterdam and Antwerp. The overall length of the Volkerak works is approximately 9.7 km (6.0 mi). The Volkerakdam is 4.5 km (2.8 mi), the Haringvliet bridge is 1.2 km (0.75 mi) and the control lock complex is 4 km (2.5 mi).

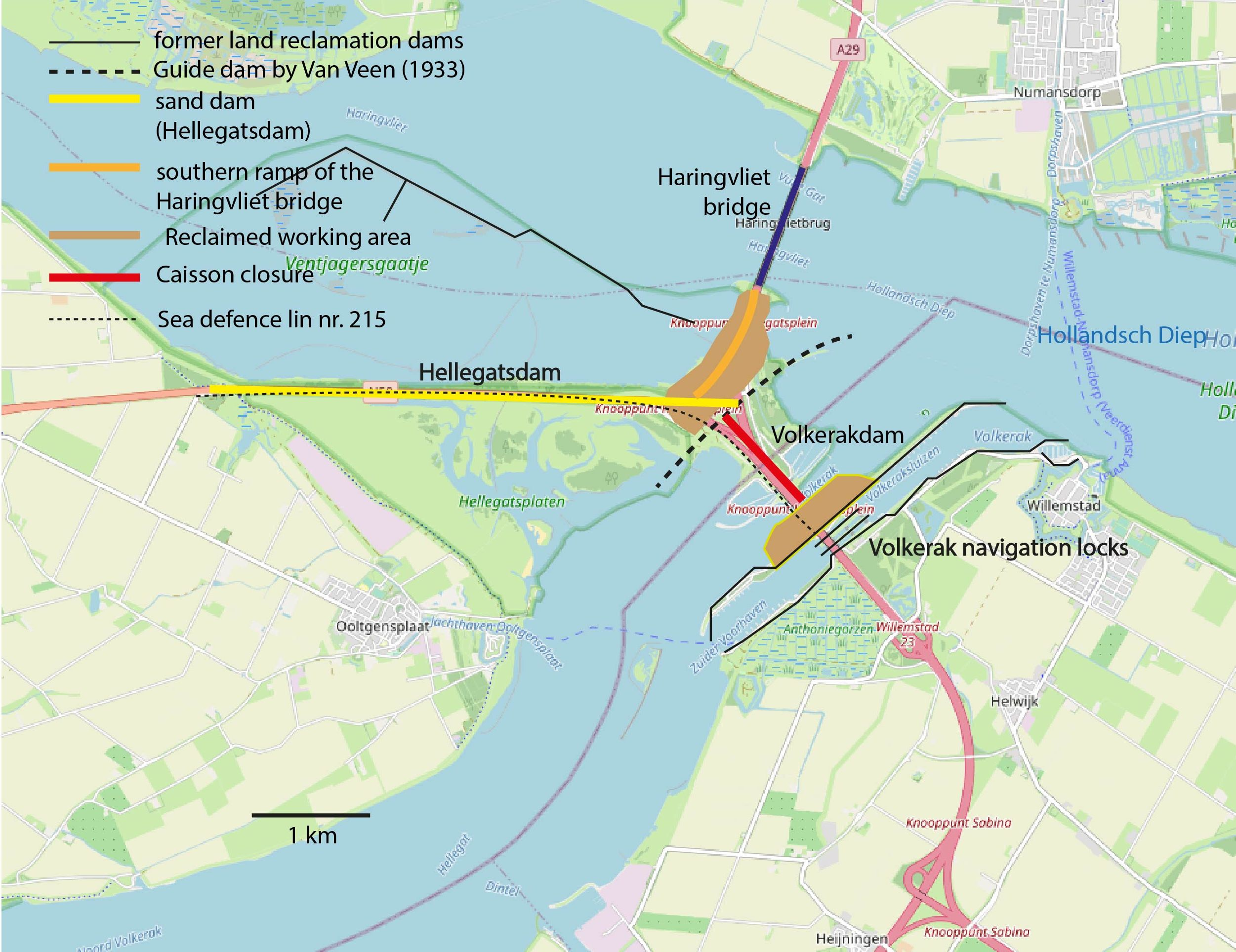
Location of the various elements making up the Volkerak Works

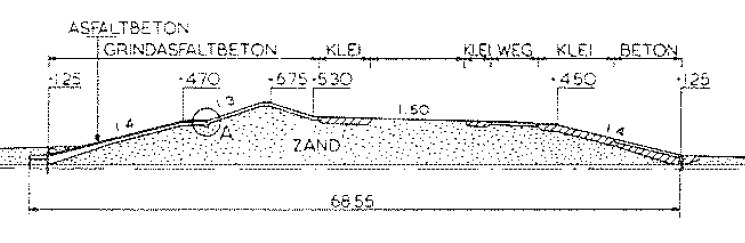
Section through the Volkerakdam

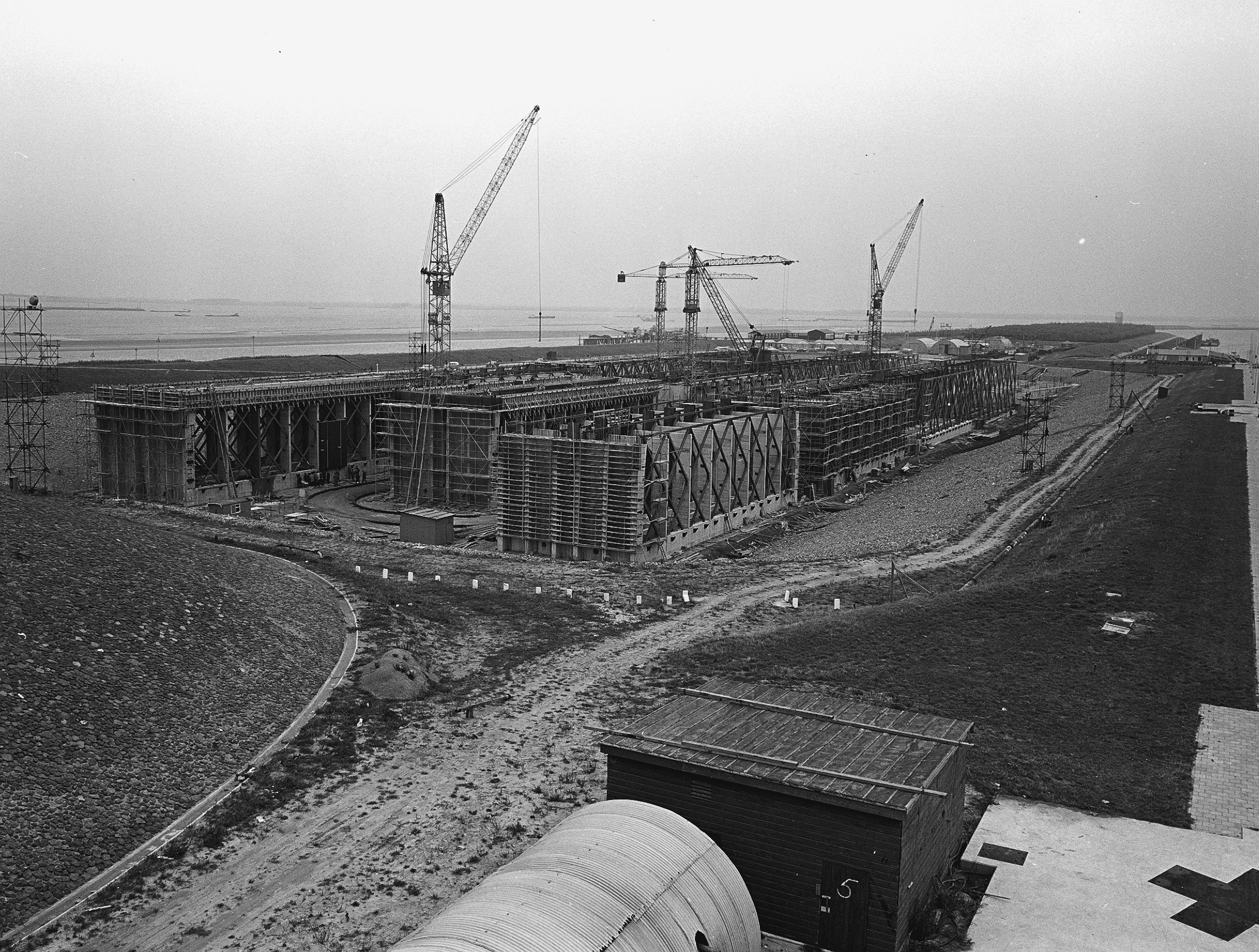
Prefabrication of caissons in the Willemstad casting basin

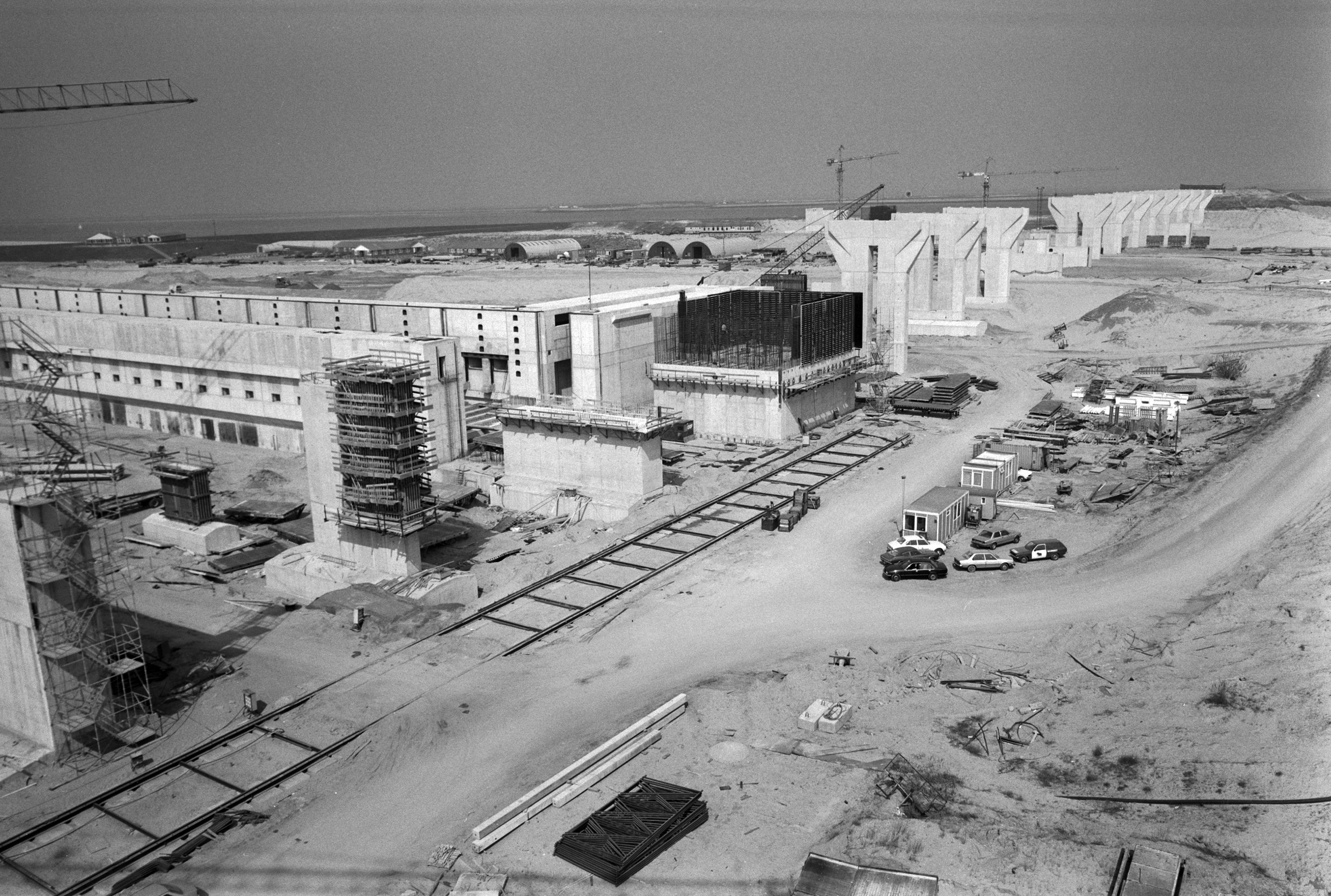
Construction of the locks

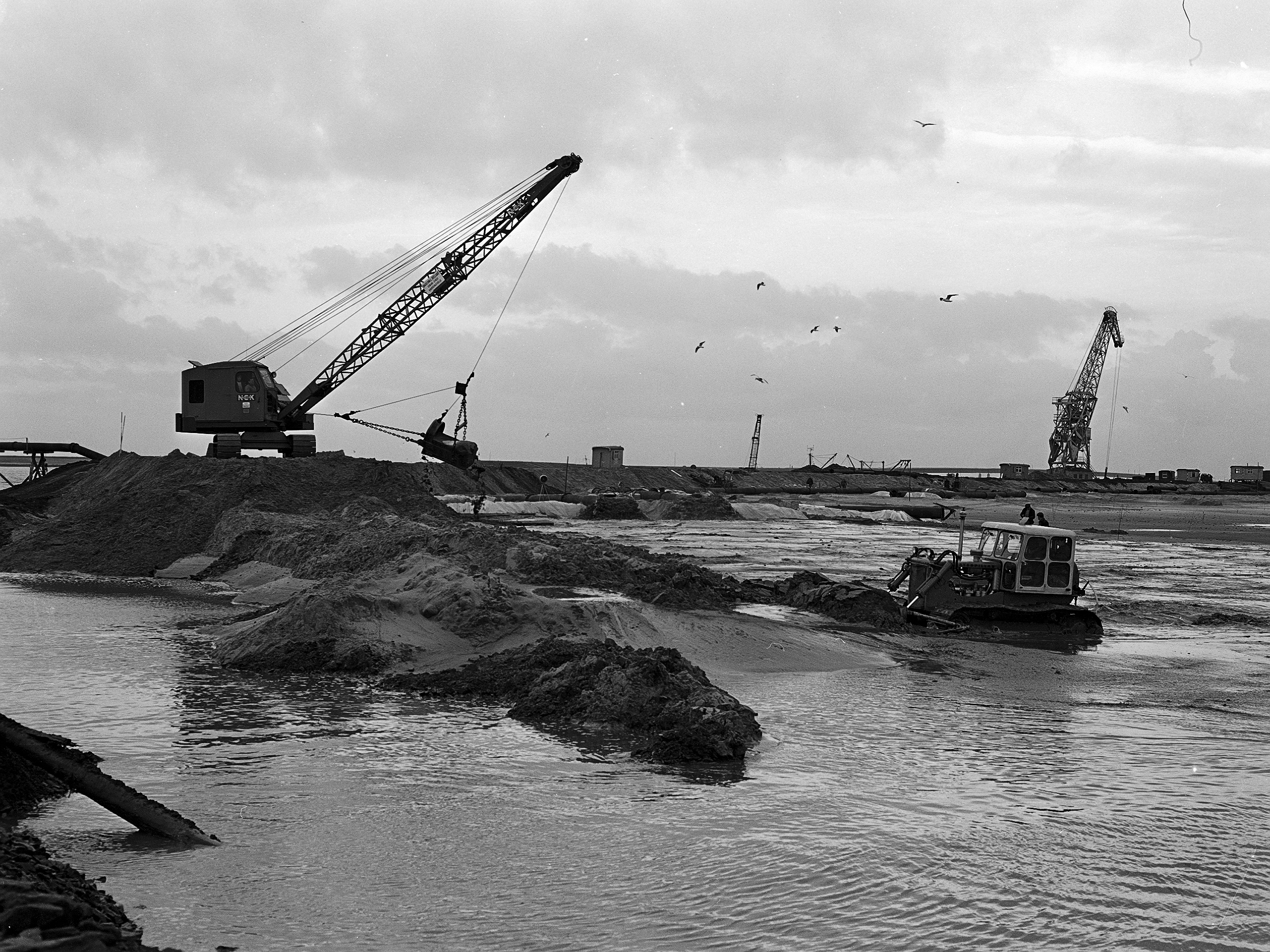
An NCK dragline excavator and Caterpillar bulldozer at work on the Volkerakdam in December 1967

=== Initial works and construction of the temporary work island at Hellegatsplaat ===
The first phase of the construction was the section of the dam from the shore of Overflakkee to Hellegat. The works in this location were constructed over a sandbank with low levels of flow, at around sea level, and requiring the closure of only one gully (the Ventjagersgaatje). The construction of this section of the works had little influence on the local tidal movement. Approximately 1.8 million cubic metres of sand was used in the construction of this part of the works, undertaken by the contractor Dirk Verstoep for approximately six million Dutch guilders.

The next phase was the construction of a temporary work island known as Hellegatsplaat, from where the bridge over the Haringvliet was constructed and the dam construction continued. Unlike the previous section, a number of deeper gullies were present, resulting in the use of caisson closures, using a technique which had previously been implemented for the construction of the Veerse Gatdam.

The excavation work for the construction dock involved processing 115,000 cubic metres of sand and excavating 65,000 cubic metres of peat and clay. Excavation and transportation of the sand was undertaken without much difficulty, as the sand could be processed as fill in the immediate vicinity of the construction dock, with much of it being used as soil improvement at the location of the excavated clay and peat layers.

=== Caissons ===
The caissons were prefabricated using precast concrete in a casting basin next to the locks. The embankments were constructed between 1967 and 1968, allowing the precast caissons to be placed. With the caissons sunk and completed, the final dam body was constructed, with the crown located 6 metres above sea level.

The bidding process for constructing the caissons necessary for the closure project was finalised in August 1966. Thirteen standard caissons were constructed, including one spare, as well as two skewed approach caissons. The design of the standard caissons was a modified version of those used in the Veerse Gat closure, with dimensions of 45 metres in length, 15 metres in width, and 13.3 metres in height.

Skewed caissons were specifically designed to eliminate the need for vertical abutment construction. The construction dock was strategically located to minimise towing requirements, placing the completed caissons as close as possible to the closure works.

To determine water levels on either side of the closure and the strength of the current passing through the caissons, it was essential to ascertain the discharge coefficients of the caissons. The water flow rate, primarily determined by the difference in water levels on either side of the closure, also depended on the shape of the flow-through openings in the caissons. Improved flow guidance led to a greater discharge. The influence of the flow-through openings' shape was expressed as the discharge coefficient.

Model research revealed that steel diagonal members in the flow-through openings negatively impacted the discharge coefficient due to their rectangular shape, causing poor flow behavior. However, experiments demonstrated that circular members increased the discharge coefficient by 8 to 10%.

The caisson placement sequence was based on both hydrological and technical execution considerations. Two potential methods were considered:

1. Working from one side of the closure to the other, with the final caisson placed near an abutment.
2. Alternating caisson placement from one side to the other, with the final caisson positioned at the closure's centre.

The second method was preferred from a technical standpoint, offering construction schedule benefits such as working around a caisson from both banks and dividing the working face into two fronts. This approach resulted in a more balanced distribution of work and reduced time risk for the construction schedule.

Laboratory studies on the closure's shape aimed to ensure regular flow distribution and minimise vortex street occurrences. Measurements taken during the closure confirmed that the model research results satisfactorily aligned with real-world conditions.

The caissons were placed during slack water, with the intention of the structure reaching the bottom exactly at the moment of tidal reversal. Research during the design stage showed that there was approximately 80 minutes available for the entire caisson sinking procedure, and tests were carried out at the Waterloopkundig Laboratorium in Delft to properly coordinate the caisson sinking maneuvers, which were undertaken using seven tugboats.

The closure took place on 25 April 1969. To increase stability during the towing and sinking processes, temporary stabilising boards were installed in the centre of each caisson unit. After completion of the closure, the re-usable elements from the caisson sinking procedure, including winches and sealing bulkheads, were removed and reused in the caissons of the Brouwersdam. The temporary casting basin for the Volkerak locks was also constructed in this section, with the soil dredged to construct this basin subsequently used as fill for the construction of ring dikes and the connecting road to Willemstad.

=== Contractors responsible for the works ===
The scale of the works meant that construction was undertaken by a number of companies, including joint venture arrangements of Dutch and Belgian companies, formed from the contractors listed in the table below.

Contractors responsible for the construction of the Volkerak Works
Contractor name	Place of business
Ballast Nedam Group	Amsterdam
W. de Beyer BV	Arnhem
Bitumarin	Zaltbommel
Boskalis	Papendrecht
Dirk Verstoep	Gouderak
I.G.B.	Breda
Dredging International	Antwerp
Betonfabriek Haringman	Goes
Verenigde Heymans-Bedrijven	Rosmalen
Hollandsche Beton Maatschappij (HBM)	Rijswijk
Lubbers' Constructie-Werkplaats en Machinefabriek "Hollandia"	Krimpen aan den IJssel
Baggermaatschappij "Holland" BV – Wijnands Werkendam BV	Hardinxveld-Giessendam
Arnold Maassen	Maastricht
MOS Grondboorbedrijf	Rhoon
Pit Beton	Middelburg
Van Rietschoten en Houwens	Rotterdam
Stork-Hensen Kranen	Rotterdam
Utroma BV	Arnhem
Zinkcon	Werkendam

== Road connections ==
Roads were constructed over the dam, creating traffic connections between South Holland, Zeeland and the west of North Brabant. The intersection known as the Hellegatsplein, where the roads from Zierikzee (N59), Rotterdam (A29) and West Brabant (A29/A59) converge, is located in the middle of the dam, on the artificial island of Hellegatsplaat.

== The Haringvliet Bridge ==
The Haringvliet Bridge is not part of the Volkerakdam, but forms part of the Volkerak Works (Volkerakwerken). Plans for a bridge crossing of the Haringvliet had existed independently of the Delta Works since 1937, when a committee had investigated the possibility of establishing a permanent bridge connection between the island of Goeree-Overflakkee and South Holland.

Following the disruption brought about by the Second World War, the plans for the bridge connection had come forward again in 1947, and by 1952 a route across Tiengemeten was proposed, but these plans were superseded after the 1953 North Sea flood disaster and the Delta Works plan. The option of including a bridge crossing as part of the Volkerak Works then began to be explored.

Construction of the bridge started in 1961, and was completed in 1964. Funding for the bridge did not come from the Delta Works budget, with the investment required to construct it covered by implementing a toll on vehicles using it. In 1975, the bridge was taken into public ownership under the management of Rijkswaterstaat, and the toll requirement was removed. The level of annual average daily traffic using the bridge far exceeded original estimates, which contributed to deterioration of the bridge resulting in emergency weight restrictions and bridge strengthening measures being introduced in the 2010s.

== The Willemstad Man ==
On 21 April 1966, during excavations for the Volkerak lock complex casting basin, construction workers M. Ten Hove and A. Roelants discovered a small carved oak male human figure. Subsequent radiocarbon analysis dated the figure to the 5th millennium BC, during the Mesolithic period. The figure is known as the Mannetje van Willemstad (English: Willemstad Man) and is displayed in The Rijksmuseum van Oudheden (English: National Museum of Antiquities) in Leiden.

== Media ==
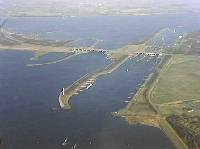
The Volkerak lock and sluice complex

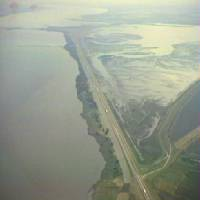
The Volkerakdam

Preparations for the closure of Volkerak

The closure of the Volkerakdam as reported by Polygoon (newsreel) (1969)

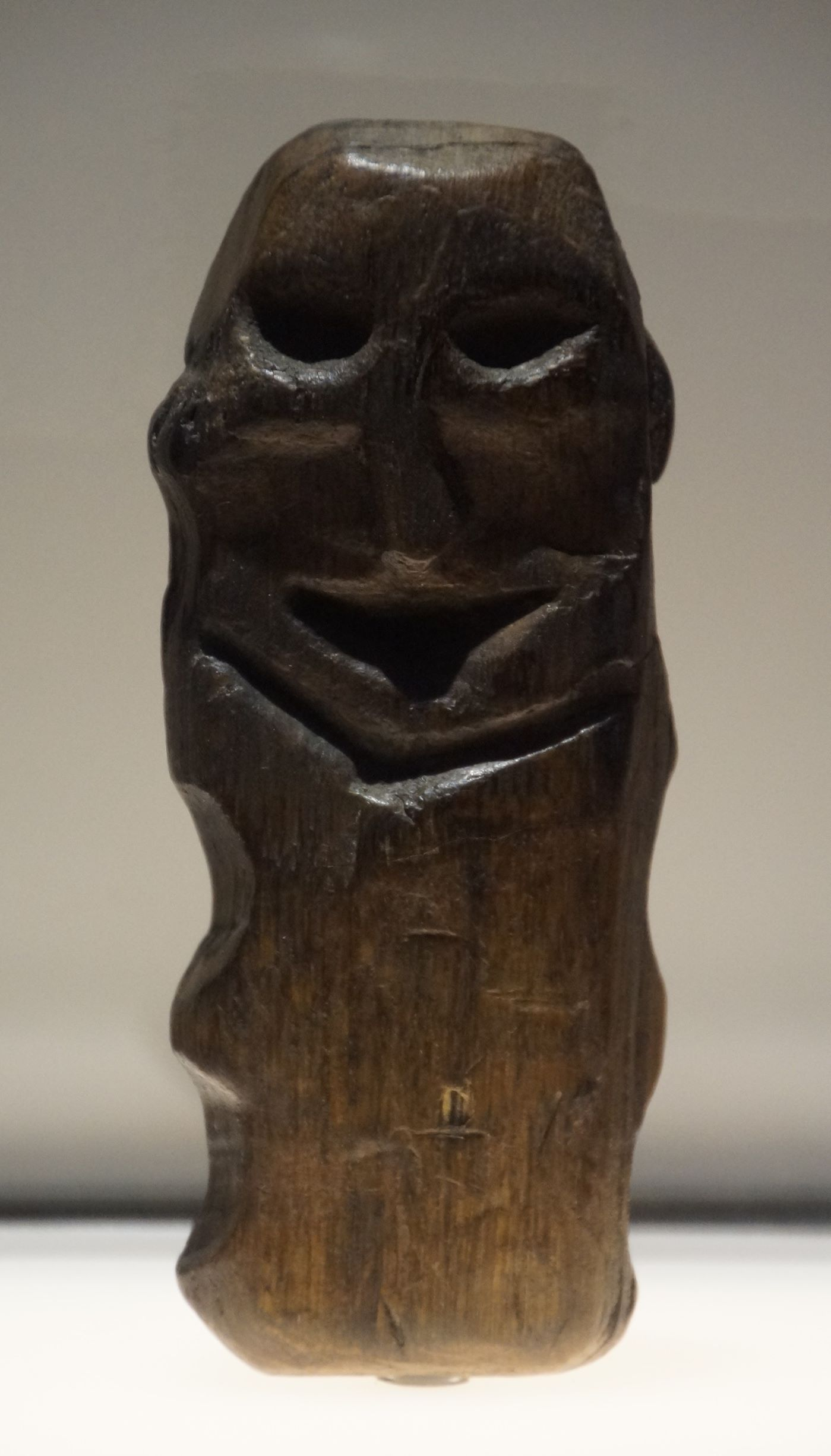
The Mannetje van Willemstad (Willemstad Man)

== See also ==
- Delta Works
- Flood control in the Netherlands
- Rijkswaterstaat
- Johan van Veen
