= Stichting Blauwe Lijn =

Dutch historical foundation dedicated to hydraulic engineering

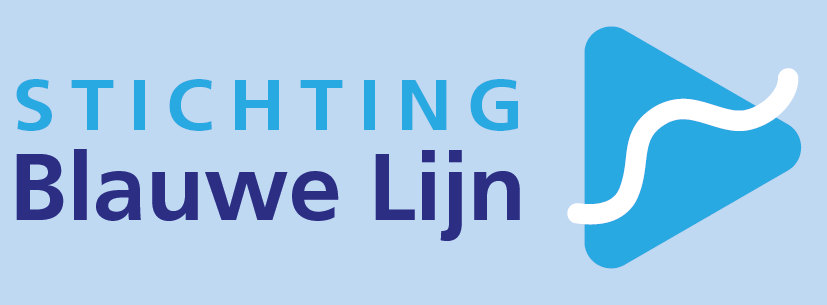
- Company type: Nonprofit organisation
- Founded: 2018
- Headquarters: Stellendam, Netherlands
- Key people: ir. Theo van de Gazelle (Chairman); Marian van Veen (Honorary chair)
- Website: www.stichtingblauwelijn.nl

The Stichting Blauwe Lijn (English: Blue Line Foundation) is an organisation based in The Netherlands focused on the preservation of biographical, technical, and historical information related to hydraulic engineering and engineers in the field. The organisation engages in public outreach and educational programmes with the stated aims of:

- preserving and making accessible historical knowledge of Dutch hydraulic engineering;
- maintaining a repository in both digital and physical forms, and providing access through a website;
- connecting historical knowledge with contemporary and future challenges in water management, involving students, experts, and knowledge networks in the process.

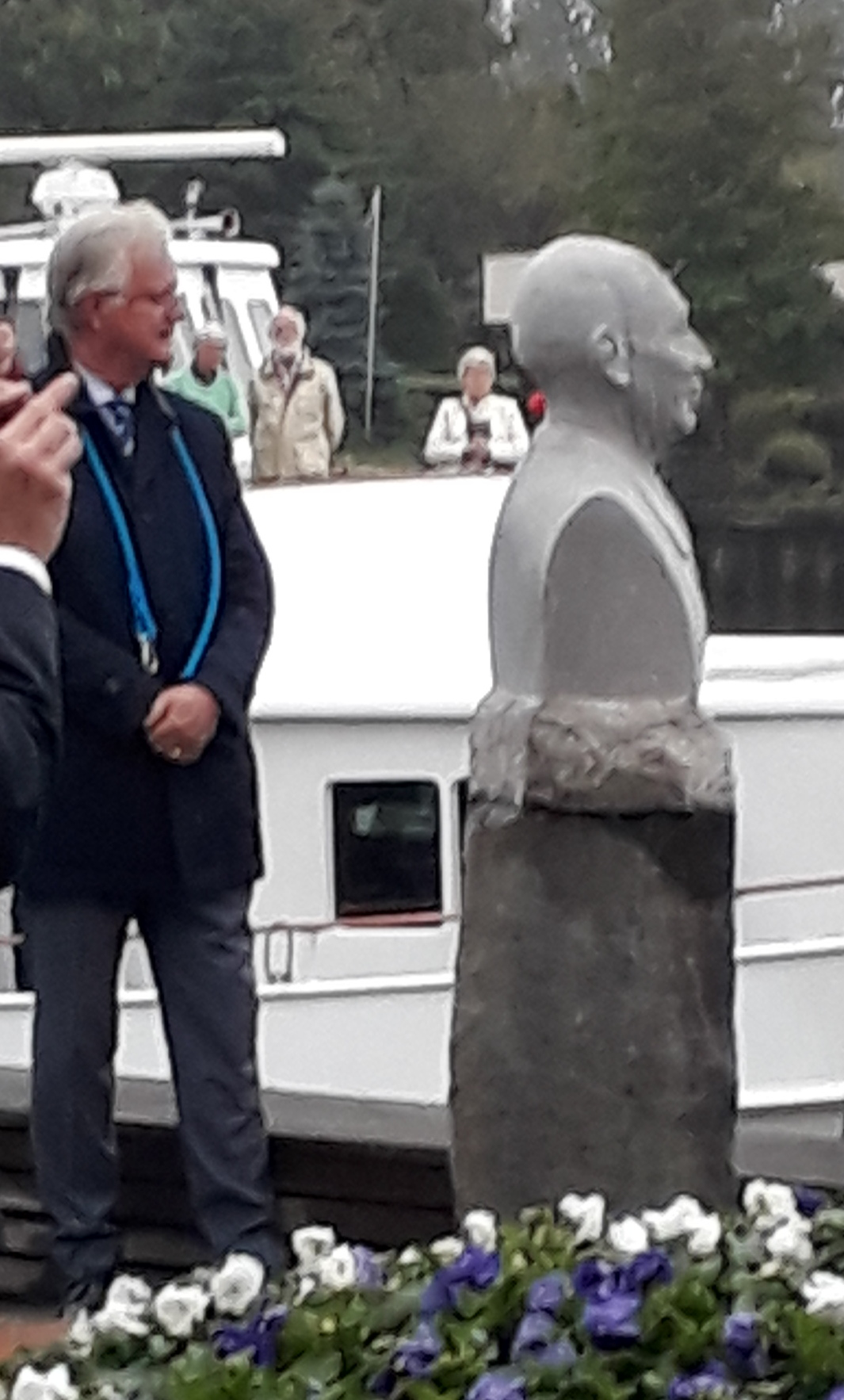
Unveiling of the statue of Johan van Veen in Capelle aan den IJssel. The statue faces towards the Stormvloedkering Hollandse IJssel, the first project undertaken as part of the Delta Works.

The Stichting Blauwe Lijn conducts tours and events, and has published a series of booklets, including 'The Water Gives and Takes', as part of its effort to disseminate information on water management, particularly to its target audience of 8 to 25 year-olds. The organisation contributed to the unveiling of a statue of Dr. Ir. Johan van Veen in Capelle aan den IJssel, and maintains biographical information and publications on notable Dutch engineers such as Johannis de Rijke, Jan Agema, and Frank Spaargaren.

The organisation is recognised by the Dutch Tax Authorities as an Algemeen Nut Beogende Instelling (ANBI) (English: Public Benefit Organisation), meaning that at least 90% of the efforts of the foundation must be focused on the general good.

== See also ==
- Delta Works
- Zuiderzee Works
- Rijkswaterstaat
