= Hollandse IJssel =

River in the Netherlands

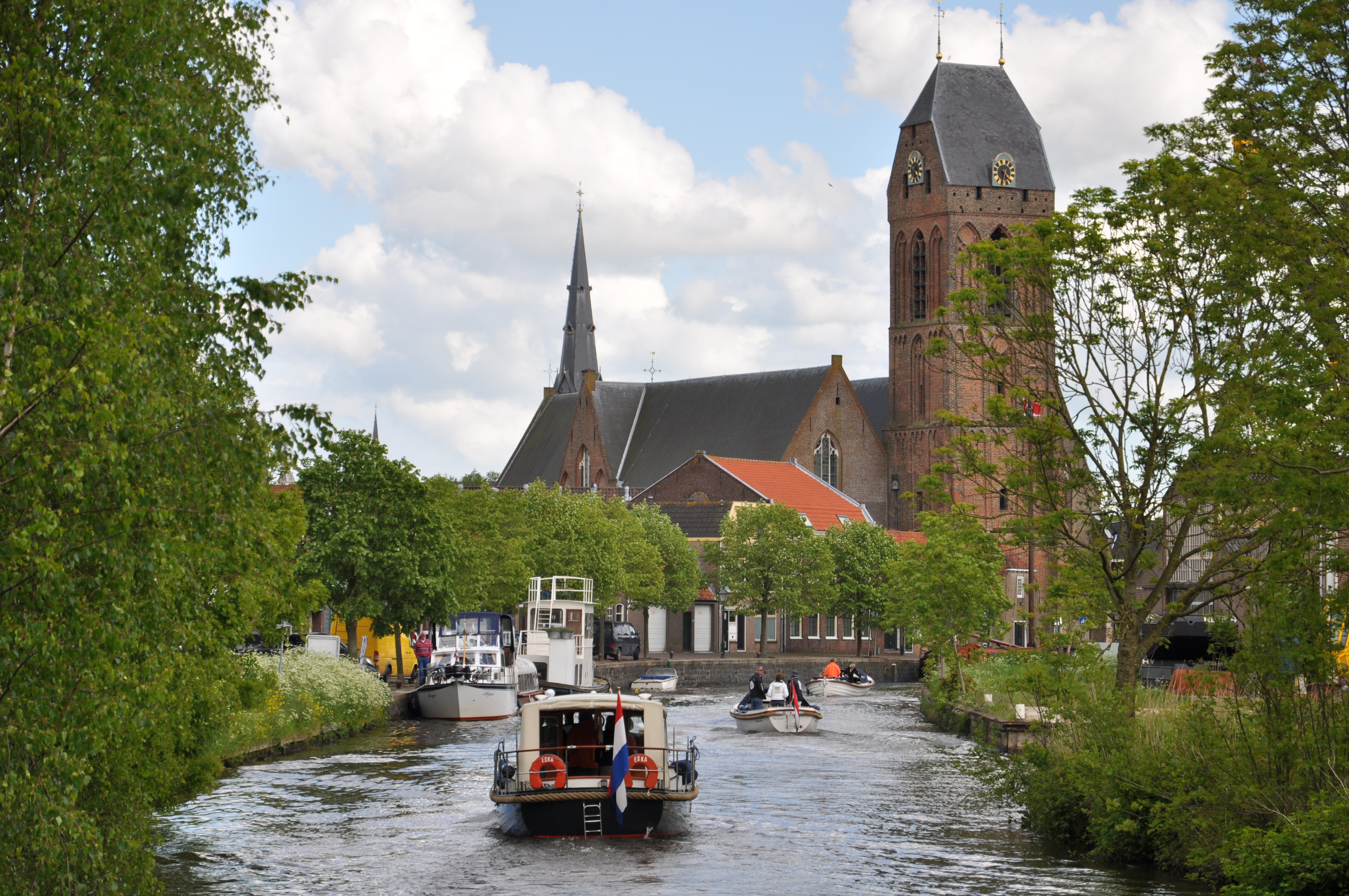
- The IJssel at Oudewater

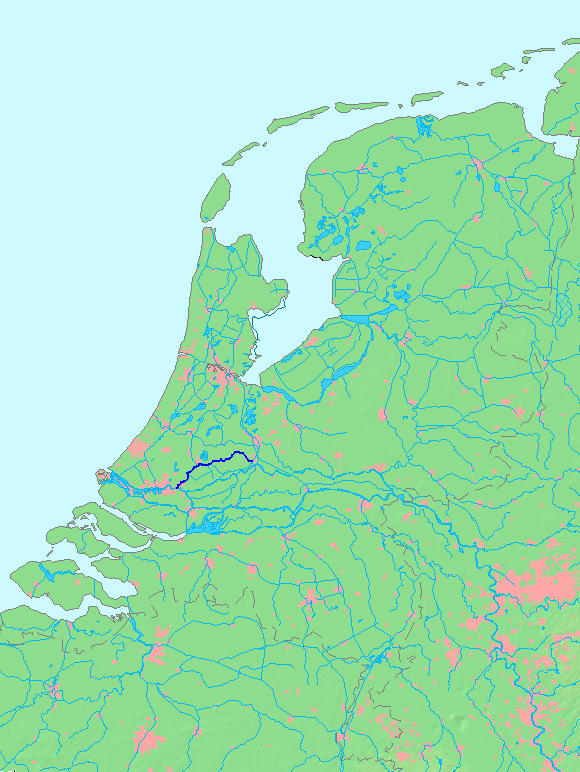
- Map with the IJssel highlighted (in dark blue)

Physical characteristics
- Source: Doorslag
  - location: Nieuwegein, Utrecht
  - coordinates: 52°00′56″N 5°04′31″E
- Mouth: Nieuwe Maas
  - location: Krimpen aan den IJssel, South Holland
  - coordinates: 51°54′29″N 4°33′40″E
- Length: 46 km (29 mi)

The Hollandse or Hollandsche IJssel (pronounced [ˌɦɔlɑntsə ˈʔɛisəl]) is a river in Utrecht and South Holland. Originally a distributary of the Lek, it is now fed by the Doorslag, an arm of the Merwede Canal. It begins in Nieuwegein at the southern end of the Doorslag. From here, it flows westwards through IJsselstein, Montfoort, Oudewater, and Gouda before emptying into the Nieuwe Maas at Capelle and Krimpen aan den IJssel, on the outskirts of Rotterdam. Another branch, the Enge IJssel ("Narrow IJssel"), flows southwestwards from Nieuwegein. A barrier at the mouth of the river, constructed as part of the Delta Works, prevents storm surges from flowing upstream.

The name Hollandse IJssel distinguishes the river from the Gelderse IJssel, which runs through Gelderland and empties into the IJsselmeer.
