= Stormvloedkering Hollandse IJssel =

Hydraulic engineering structure in the Netherlands

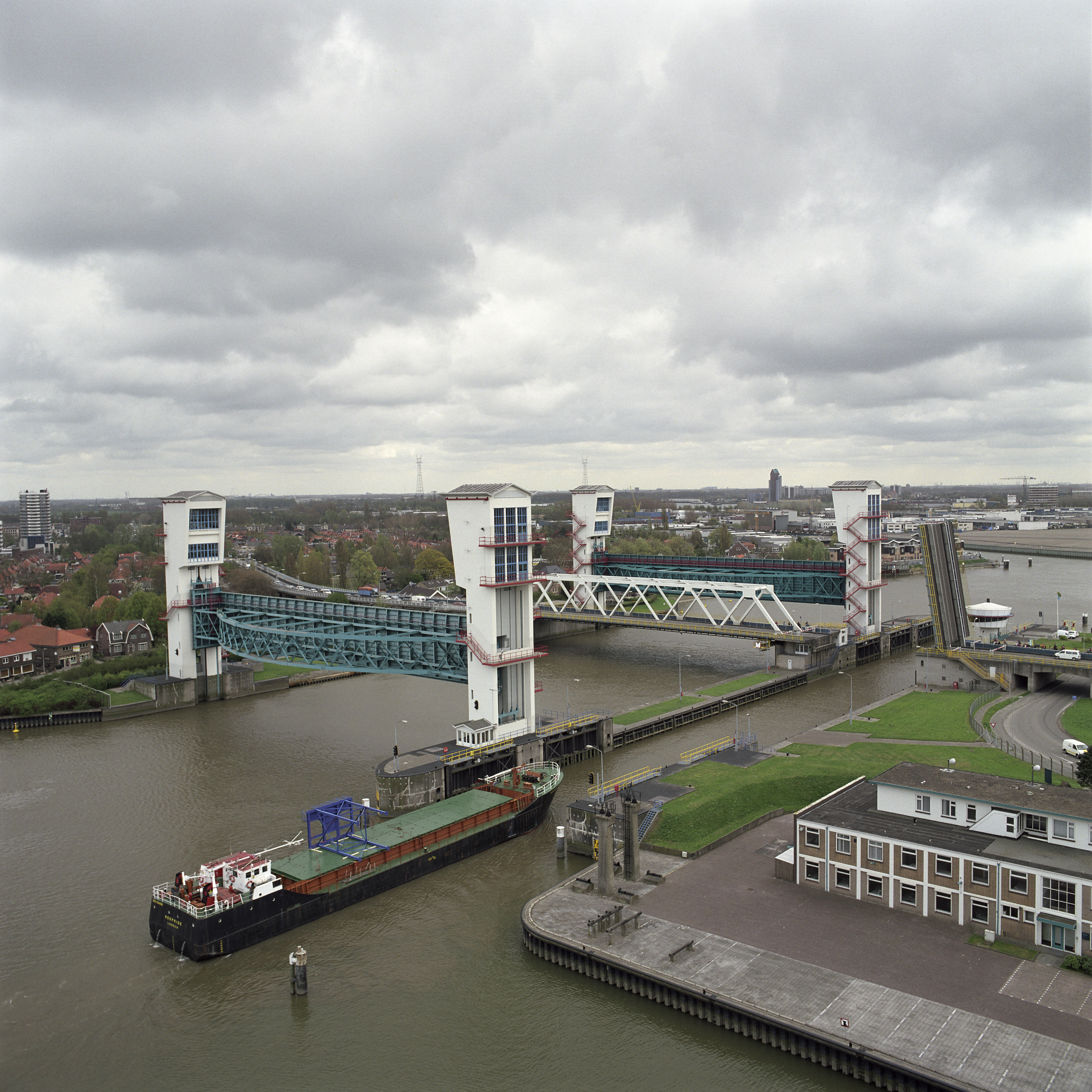
- The Stormvoedkering Hollandse IJssel with the bascule bridge in the open position
- Coordinates: 51°55′02.7″N 4°34′46.1″E
- Carries: N210 (via the Algera bridge located between the lock gates)
- Crosses: Hollandse IJssel
- Owner: Rijkswaterstaat

Characteristics
- Width: 80m (sluice gates)
- Height: 45m (towers)
- Longest span: 80m
- No. of spans: 1

History
- Architect: J.A.G. van der Steur jr.
- Designer: Deltadienst
- Engineering design by: H.G. Kroon (Construction Engineer)
- Construction start: 1954
- Construction end: 1958 (first sluice gate and bridge), 1976 (second sluice gate)
- Opened: 22 October 1958
- Replaces: Ferry

Location
- Interactive map of Stormvloedkering Hollandse IJssel

The Stormvloedkering Hollandse IJssel (English: Hollandse IJssel Storm Surge Barrier), Hollandse IJsselkering (Hollandse IJssel Barrier) or Algerakering (Algera Barrier) is a storm surge barrier located on the Hollandse IJssel, at the municipal boundary of Capelle aan den IJssel and Krimpen aan den IJssel, east of Rotterdam in The Netherlands. The construction of the works comprised the first project of the Delta Works, undertaken in response to the disastrous effects of the North Sea flood of 1953. Prior to 1954, the spelling Hollandsche was used in the official name.

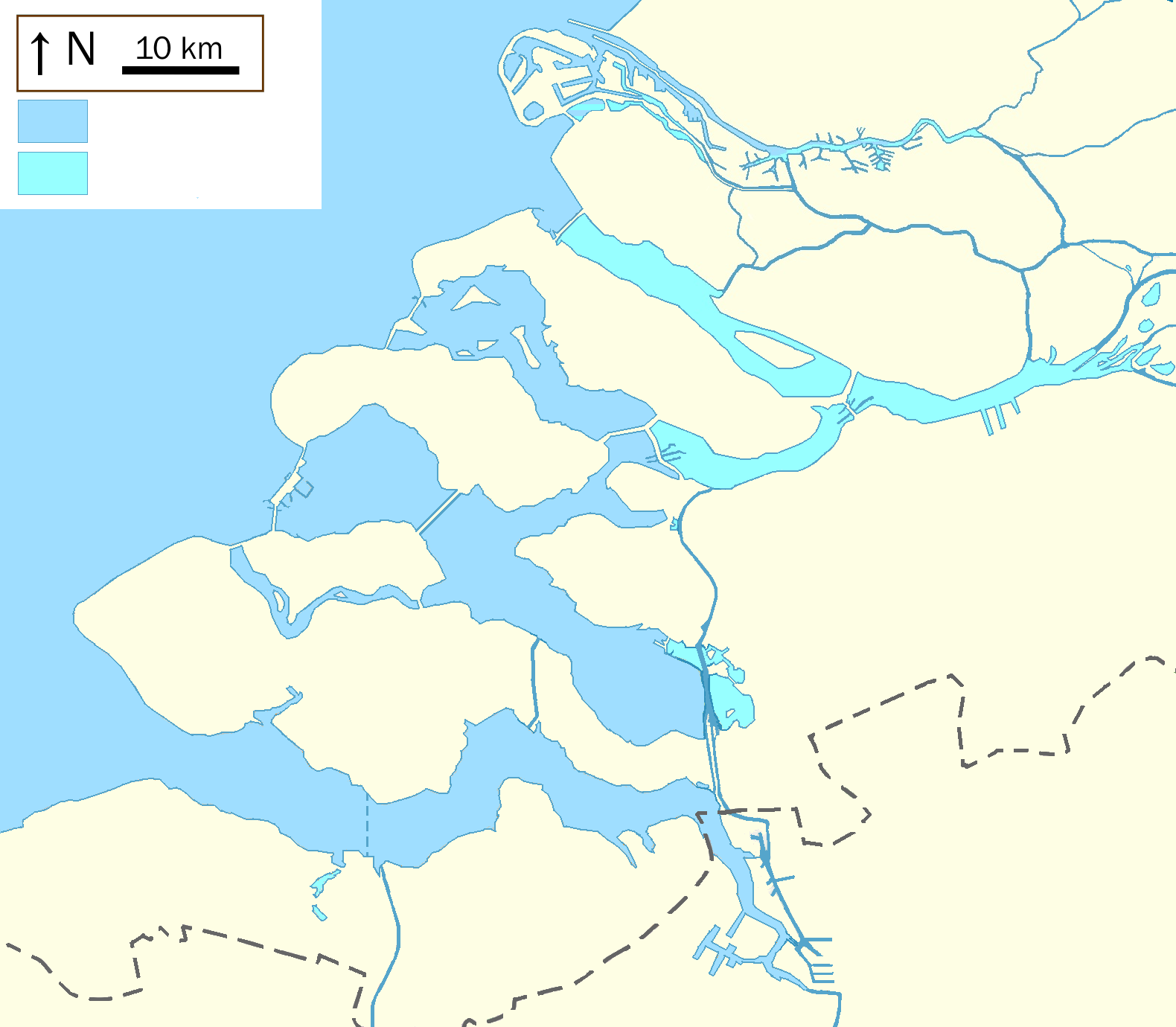
Delta Works

The Hollandse IJssel is a low-lying river, and during the 1953 flood, the river dikes were exposed to dangerously high water levels, placing around 1.5 million people in the Randstad at risk from flooding. A dike at Ouderkerk aan den IJssel failed, and a dike in Nieuwerkerk aan den IJssel was almost breached, being sealed only after the local mayor ordered sailor Arie Evegroen to navigate his barge Twee Gebroeders into the hole which had been formed in it. The body in charge of the Delta Works, the Deltacommissie, therefore prioritised the construction of a storm surge barrier, and in January 1954, less than a year after the flood, dredging works were undertaken to start the project.

On May 6, 1958, the first sluice gate was lowered as a test, with the storm surge barrier made operational on 22 October 1958. The barrier is often referred to colloquially as the Algerakering, but has never been officially known by that name. The name arises as the adjacent bridge carrying the N210 road is officially named the Algerabrug (Algera Bridge), after Jacob Algera, who resigned as Minister of Transport and Water Management for health reasons on 10 October 1958, only twelve days before the opening of the project. The architect was J.A.G. van der Steur Jr., and the project was designed by the Deltadienst department of Rijkswaterstaat, with H.G. Kroon as construction engineer.

The barrier is classified as a Rijksmonument. The four towers of the barrier are lit to act as aids to navigation, with blue lighting indicating an open barrier and red lighting indicating that the barrier is closed.

== Design and planning ==
As the Hollandse IJssel is an important shipping route, the option of permanently closing the river with a dam was not taken forward. However, the potential advantages of a closure included increased supply security of drinking water for large parts of South Holland, by reducing the inflow of seawater into the polders. A storm surge barrier with two movable sluice gates, suspended between concrete towers, was chosen as the solution. The sluices are only closed at periods of very high water, with shipping able to sail underneath the raised gates at other times.

The Algerasluis, a 23.9 metre wide, 139 metre long control lock located north-west of the barrier, permits ships up to CEMT Class Va to navigate beyond the barrier at times of closure. A bascule bridge is located within the structure, having a closed clearance height of 7.11 metres.

The project was designed such that the two gates could be operated independently, minimising the risks from failure and permitting regular maintenance. Due to budgetary constraints, the second sluice gate did not come into operation until 1976, by which time the barrier had operated with a single sluice gate for almost 18 years. The gates were designed for different load cases and water levels on both sides of the barrier, as shown in the table below.

Originally designed load cases for the sluice gates with water level in metres above Amsterdam Ordnance Datum (NAP)
Load case	Sea-side water level (NAP, m)	Land-side water level (NAP, m)
a	+4.50	0.00
b	+2.50	-2.00
c	-1.95	+0.30

== Construction and operation ==
The towers are 45 metres high, and the barrier gates are 12 metres high, 80 metres in width, and 135 metres apart. The total weight of each gate is 480 tonnes. Construction of the foundations involved steel sheet piles being installed in pairs, with ground anchors welded to the bottom of the piles to transfer loads to the foundation concrete. The towers are constructed of reinforced concrete with precast concrete slabs forming two floors at the top of each structure, one containing the cable wheels for the sluice counterweight, and the other housing the mechanical parts of the lifting mechanism.

Eight galvanised wire rope lifting and lowering cables with steel cores were used, guided over two 4.8 metre diameter cable wheels at the top of each tower, mounted on a forged steel axle with two self-aligning spherical roller bearings. The mechanism allowed the gates to be moved at a rate between 2 and 3 centimetres per second. The gates were fabricated and assembled in Dordrecht before being transported to site on barges, via Rotterdam, for installation.

The total construction cost of the Hollandse IJssel Storm Surge Barrier amounted to approximately forty million guilders. One barrier is closed at an anticipated water level of 2.25 metres above Amsterdam Ordnance Datum (NAP). Closure of the barrier takes between 20 and 60 minutes. The barrier is closed four to five times per year on average, and is also closed once per month on a test basis during the storm season between October and April.

== The Algera Bridge ==
The Algera Bridge, the first major fixed cross-river connection between Krimpenerwaard and the mainland of South Holland, consists of a fixed bridge over the river and a bascule bridge over the lock. The fixed bridge is supported on two piers, one of which forms the transition to a viaduct on the east side, with the other forming a support for the bascule bridge. West of the bridge, there is an underpass designed to allow north–south traffic to pass uninterrupted.

== The effects of the construction of the Maeslantkering ==
The construction of the Maeslant barrier (Maeslantkering) in 1997 resulted in a higher factor of safety from flooding for the areas behind it, including areas protected by the Hollandse IJsselkering. The Maeslant barrier is designed for very extreme floods (when the water level is predicted to be 3 metres or more above NAP in Rotterdam). On average, this occurs once every 10 years. When the Maeslant barrier is closed, the entrance to the old port of Rotterdam at Oude Haven is closed to all shipping for at least 24 hours. The dikes behind the Hollandse IJsselkering can only cope with water levels up to 2.25 metres above NAP, and therefore it is closed more often than the Maeslant barrier - around 3 to 4 times per year.

Although it would be technically possible to abandon the Hollandse IJsselkering and close the Maeslantkering more frequently, the undesirable economic effects arising from the associated shipping disruption mean that the Hollandse IJsselkering remains in operation. In addition, the operation to close the Maeslant barrier takes much longer than the Hollandse IJsselkering, which can be completely closed in around 4 hours. Closure of the Maeslantkering is therefore reserved only for extreme high water levels and the Hollandse IJsselkering remains essential to Rijkswaterstaat's overall flood management strategy.

== Media ==
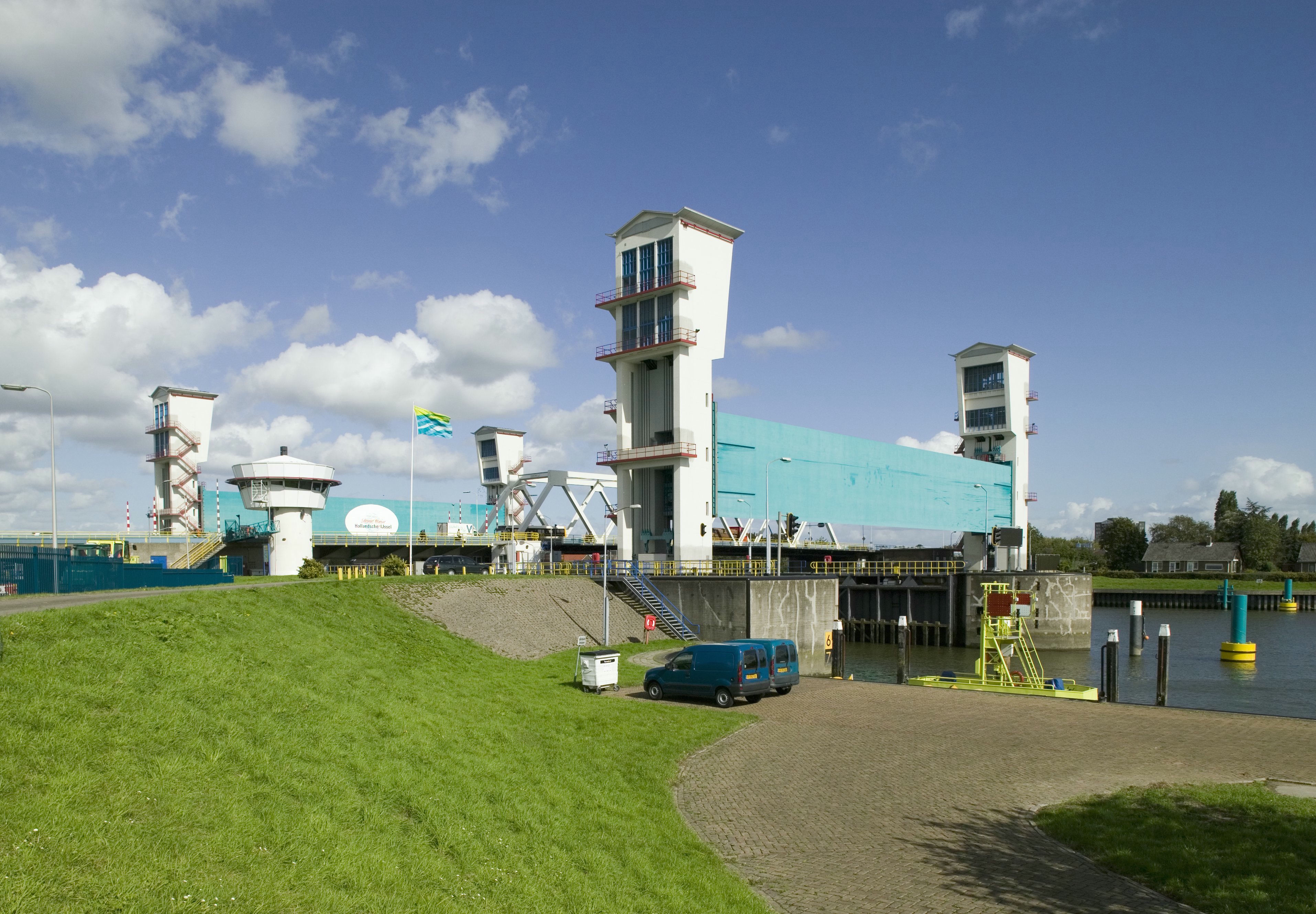
The Stormvloedkering Hollandse IJssel

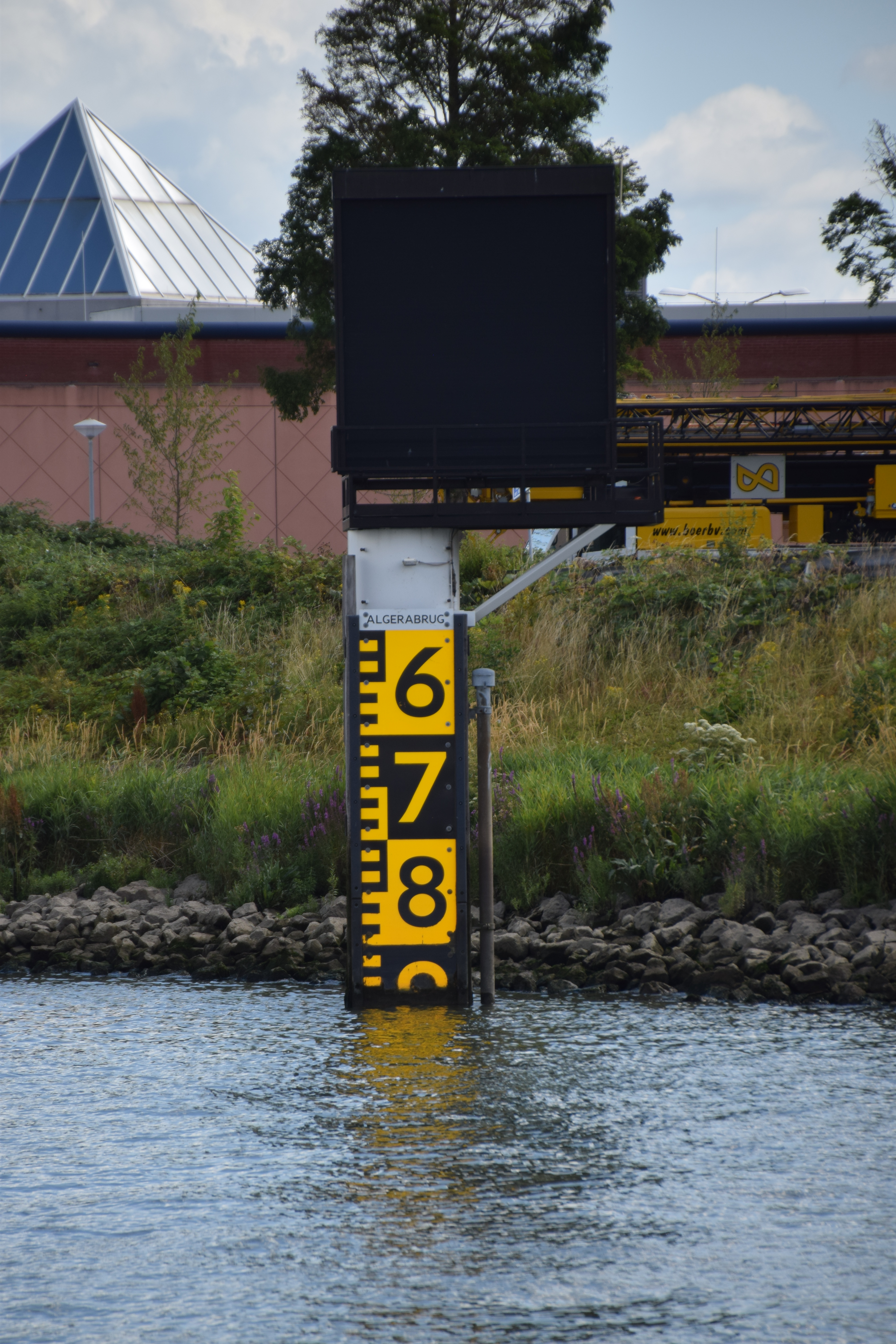
Water level gauge at the Algera Bridge

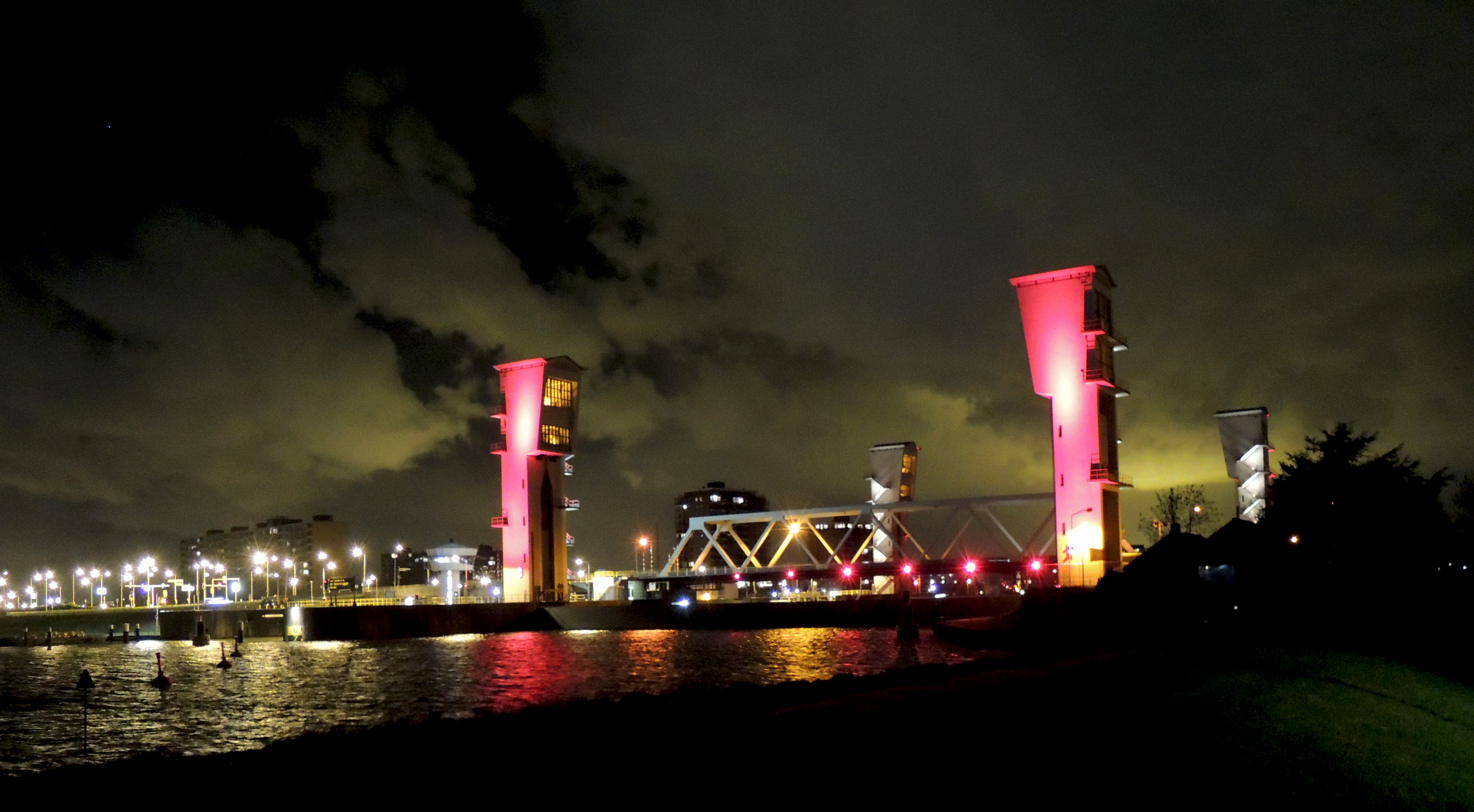
The towers lit in red to show that the barrier is closed

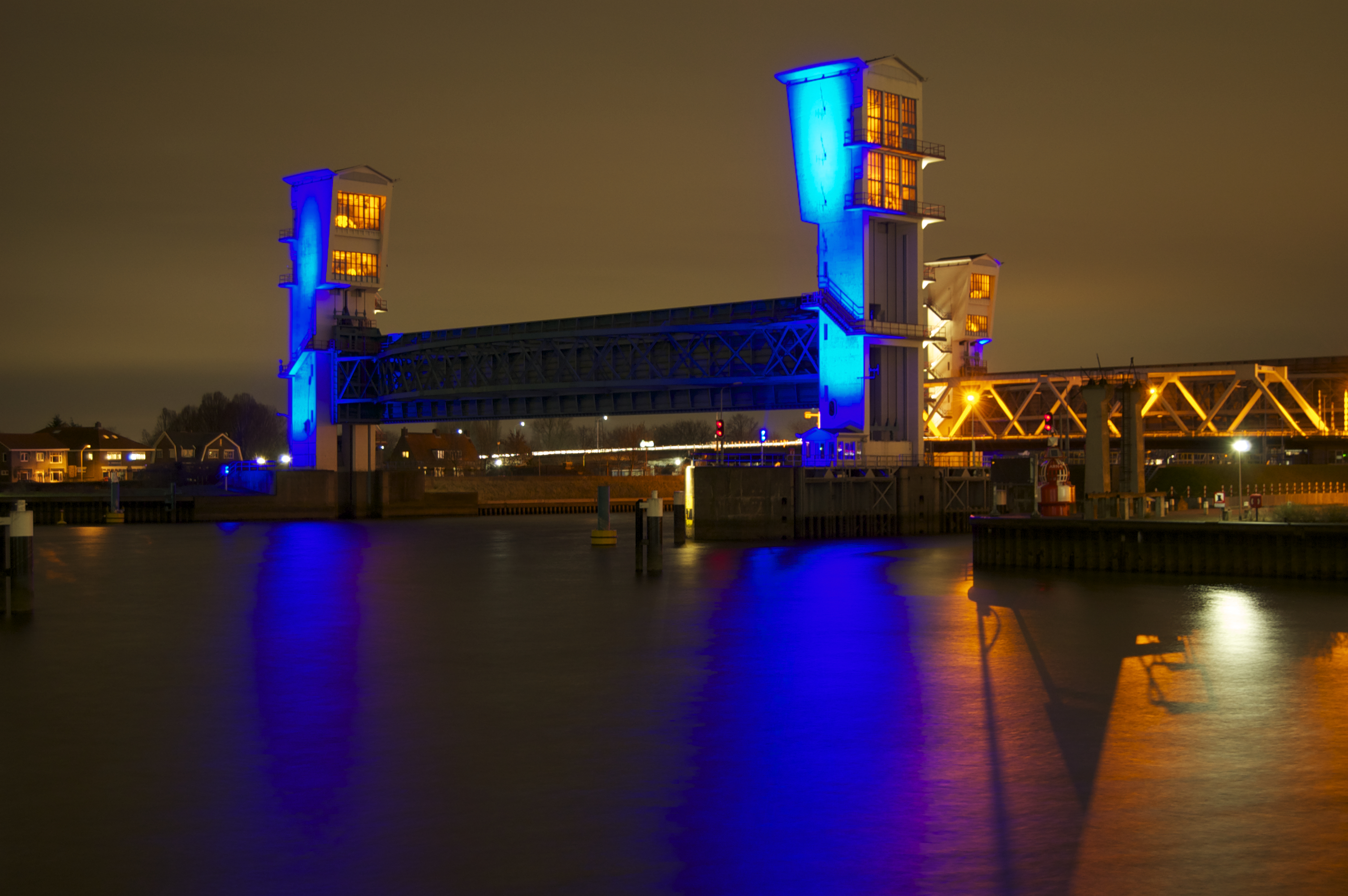
The towers lit in blue, indicating that the barrier is open

Report on the works by Polygoon (newsreel) (18 December 1957)

== See also ==
- Delta Works
- Flood control in the Netherlands
- Rijkswaterstaat
