= Eendracht =

Canal

Coordinates: 51°34′00″N 4°13′30″E

The Eendracht is a former tidal branch of river Scheldt that has been channelised to form the northern stretch of the Scheldt-Rhine Canal. It flows from the Zoommeer lake (formerly part of the Oosterschelde) near Bergen op Zoom past the town and eponymous island of Tholen towards the former island of Sint Philipsland, where it used to end in the Krabbenkreek estuary. The passage to the estuary has been closed off, however, and an additional stretch of canal was dug to connect the Eendracht to the Krammer lake, itself a former estuary closed off from the sea during the Delta Works. The Eendracht is probably the last remaining remnant of the Striene river.
