= Zoommeer =

Lake in the Netherlands

Coordinates: 51°29′58″N 4°14′41″E

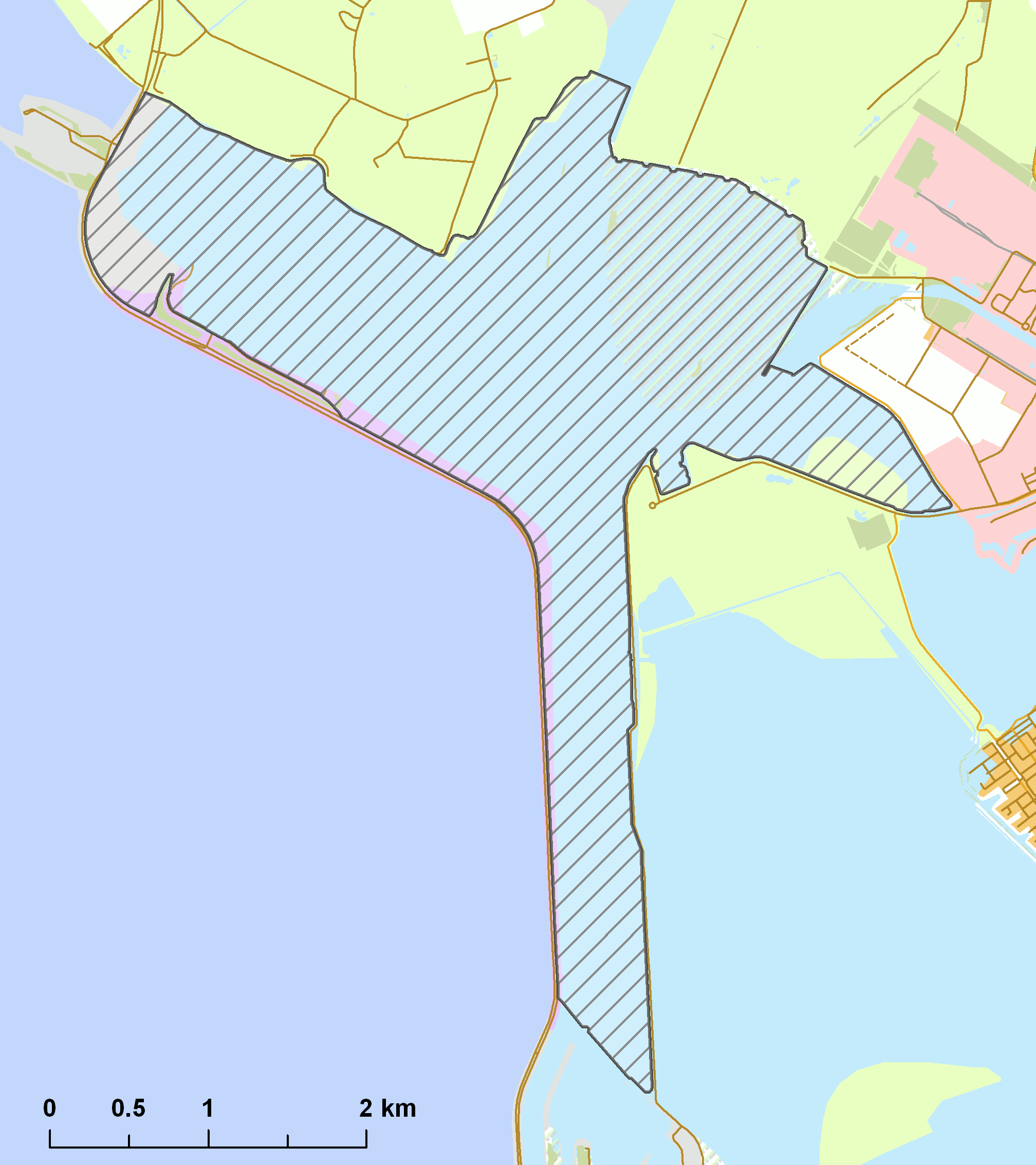

The Zoommeer is a freshwater lake in eastern Zeeland. The lake is located south of Tholen and west of Bergen op Zoom, on the site of the drowned land of Reimerswaal. A 1,053-hectare area on the Natura 2000 list.

The Zoommeer was created by the construction of the Oesterdam and the Markiezaatskade and is part of the Scheldt-Rhine Canal, a tide-free shipping route between the Ports of Antwerp and Rotterdam, as well as Germany and beyond, with a waterway usable up to CEMT class VIb. The lake is directly connected to the Krammer/Volkerak via the Scheldt-Rhine Canal.

The Theodorushaven in Bergen op Zoom is accessible to vessels up to CEMT class V via the Burgemeester Peterssluis. On the west side is the Bergse Diepsluis, which creates a CEMT class 0 waterway with the Oosterschelde.

The general water quality of the Zoommeer lake has been problematic for years due to the growth of blue-green algae.
