= Markiezaatskade =

Dam in the Netherlands

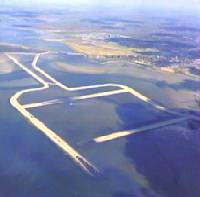
- Aerial view
- Coordinates: 51°28′19.4″N 4°13′48.4″E
- Crosses: Eastern Scheldt Estuary
- Owner: Rijkswaterstaat

Characteristics
- Total length: 4 kilometres (2.5 mi)

History
- Engineering design by: Deltadienst
- Constructed by: Several contractors
- Construction start: 1980
- Construction end: 1983
- Opened: 1983

Location
- Interactive map of Markiezaatskade

The Markiezaatskade is a compartmentalisation dam in The Netherlands, situated between South Beveland and Molenplaat, near Bergen op Zoom. The dam was constructed as part of the Delta Works, and has a length of 4 kilometres (2.5 miles).

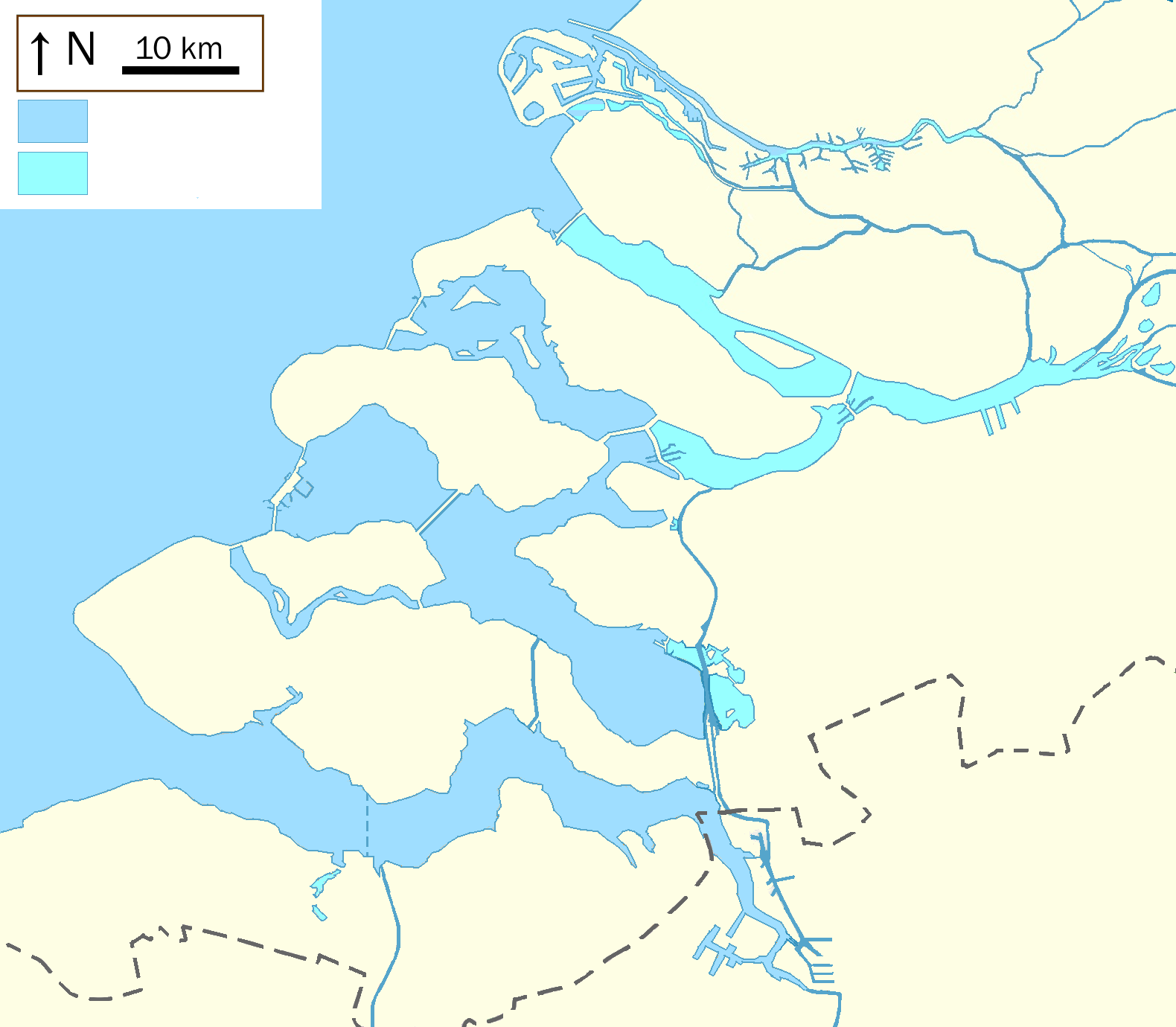
Delta Works

The dam was conceived as an auxiliary dam to permit the construction of the Oesterdam, and encloses the Markiezaat area of Bergen op Zoom. Without this structure, the location of the Oesterdam would have been situated more to the west, which would have resulted in negative ecological impacts for shellfish and resulted in significantly higher costs for the dam. In combination with the Oesterdam, Philipsdam and Volkerakdam, it divides the waters of Zeeland and South Holland.

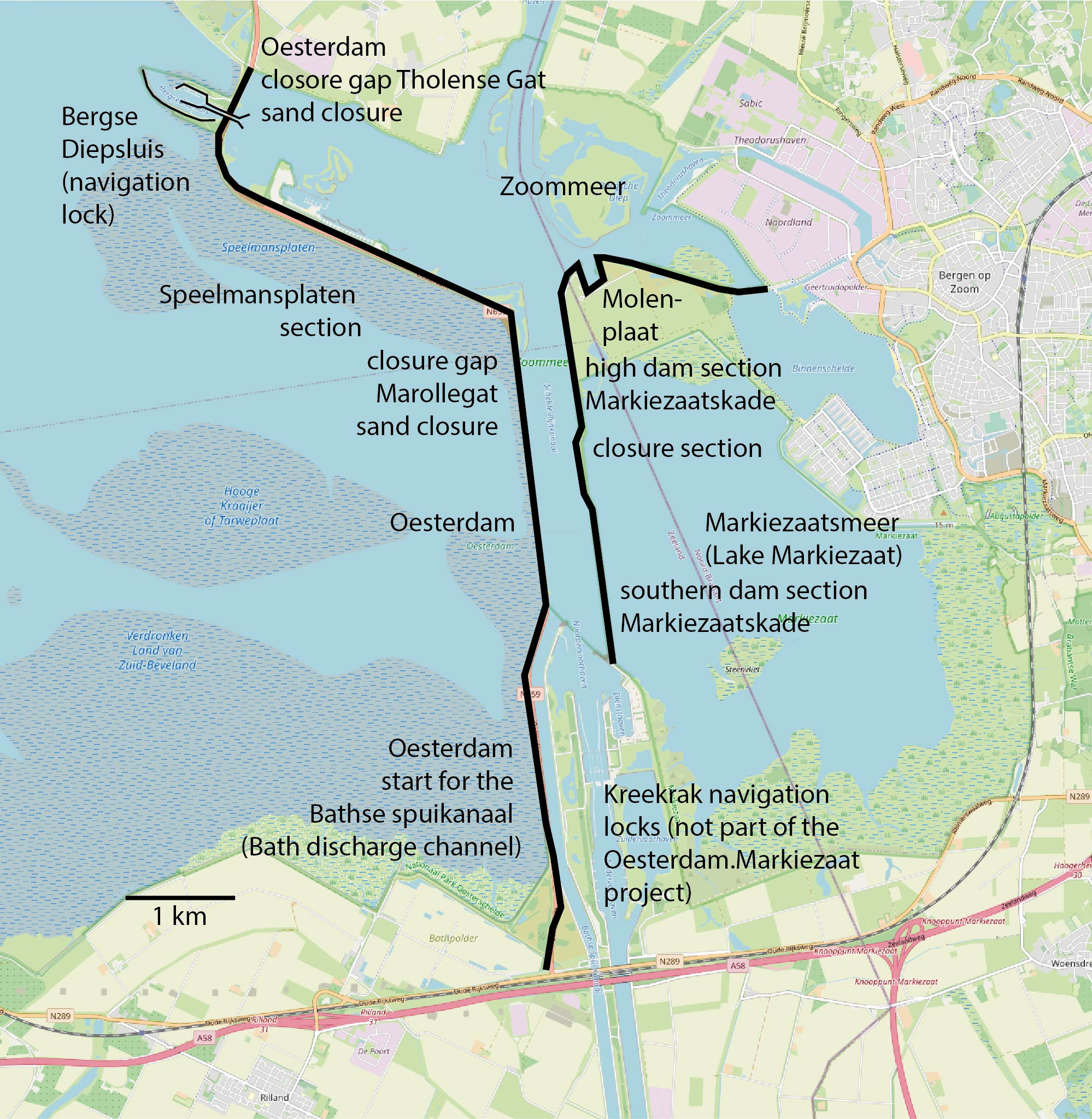
Location of the Oesterdam and Markiezaatskade works

Construction of the Markiezaatskade commenced in 1980. In March 1982, during construction, a part of the dam was destroyed by a storm. Construction on the dam was completed by March 30, 1983.

== Design and construction ==
The dam is L-shaped, with a northern part between Molenplaat and Noordland, a western part between Molenplaat and Kreekrak locks, and a discharge structure in its western embankment. Constructed to facilitate the construction of the Oesterdam, it divides (along with the Oesterdam, Bathse Spuis Lock, Bathse Spuis Canal, and Philipsdam) the Zeeland and South Holland waters into compartments for the management of freshwater and navigation.

Along with the Oesterdam, it forms the limit of the freshwater Zoommeer. The construction of the dam created the Markiezaatsmeer wetland. The purpose of the Markiezaatskade was to permit easier construction of the Oesterdam and improve the ecological quality of the area. Since the construction of the Oesterdam was completed, it does not play a role in storm surge protection.

An area of land behind the current dam location was permanently flooded during the Saint Felix flood of 1530. The dam is located in the estuary of the Eastern Scheldt, where the North Sea meets the Scheldt, with a tidal range of up to five metres. The Markiezaatskade construction cut off this water from tidal influence.

Most of the dam was built with sand, except for the 800-metre-long closing gap in the western leg, which was to be filled with a temporarily porous closing dike. This dike was intended to gradually silt up over the years naturally, with the aim of slowly transitioning the Markiezaatsmeer from a saline waterbody to a freshwater lake.

The original probabilistic design had utilised relatively low dam sections, mainly driven by financial considerations, with a construction schedule planning for the closure works to be undertaken in summer. However, due to delays, the closure shifted to winter. Construction of the dam faced delays due to the extremely soft subsoil. In the spring of 1982, during the placement of armourstone, a small unfinished section of the dam stood only 2.25 meters above the Amsterdam Ordnance Datum (NAP). On 11 March 1982, a minor but intense storm coinciding with a spring tide caused a sudden rise in the Oosterschelde basin's water level.

The swift escalation in water levels was partially attributed to the peak wind speeds coinciding with the period of high water. Consequently, and due to the closure dike already extending over half its length at 4 metres above NAP, the water level in the Markiezaat remained markedly low, around 0.6 metres above NAP at the time of the high tide. This posed a threat to the stability of the dam head. A 40-tonne crawler crane was stationed on the dam, and could not be removed due to the unforeseen and sudden rise in water levels, thereby exacerbating the stability issues on the dam.

This unexpected surge, which reached 3.67 meters above NAP, caused significant overflow and ultimately led to a breach in the incomplete section, resulting in substantial damage. In a few days, a gap of approximately 150 meters wide formed in the dike, and scour pits with depths of up to 26 metres below NAP on the east side, and 22 metres below NAP on the west side, were formed. The eastern scour pit quickly expanded in the direction of a nearby high-voltage electricity mast.

After the breach, emergency measures were taken to ensure the stability of the high-voltage electricity mast and to reduce hindrance to navigation on the Scheldt-Rhine waterway. To repair the breach, various options were examined. Eventually, it was decided to proceed with a new closure and to strengthen and raise the existing northern and southern dam sections.

== Completion and environmental functions ==
After the completion of the Oesterdam in 1986, the Markiezaatskade took on its final environmental function, as a water barrier between Bergen op Zoom and the Scheldt-Rhine connection. This separation was necessary to isolate the nature reserves in and around the Markiezaatsmeer from the Scheldt-Rhine Canal, which could not be protected from pollution due to the presence of locks and shipping.

Subsequently, the Markiezaatsmeer became the largest wetland area in the Netherlands after the Wadden Sea and the IJsselmeer. Most species of breeding birds in the Netherlands can be found there, with a large colony of spoonbills arriving in the spring. Orchids grow along the walking paths, and the lake also serves as a freshwater buffer for the surrounding area.

== Gallery ==
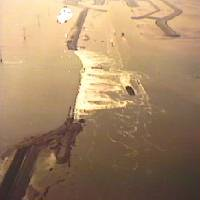
Markiezaatskade during construction

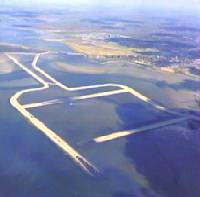
Markiezaatskade in the eastern part of the Oosterschelde near Bergen op Zoom

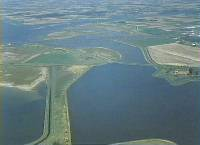
Northern part of the Markiezaatskade
