= Philipsdam =

Hydraulic engineering structures in the Netherlands

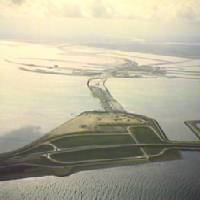
- The Philipsdam
- Coordinates: 51°39′41″N 4°9′42″E
- Carries: N257
- Owner: Rijkswaterstaat

Characteristics
- Total length: 6.1 kilometres (3.8 mi)

History
- Architect: F.W. de Vlaming (locks and buildings); F.L. Halenbeek (Landscape)
- Engineering design by: Deltadienst
- Constructed by: Several contractors, including: Combinatie Zinkcon bv Aannemers Combinatie Zinkwerken bv J. Heijmans bv Baggermaatschappij 'Holland' bv.
- Construction start: 1976
- Construction end: 1987

Location
- Interactive map of Philipsdam

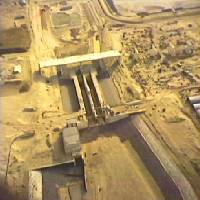
The lock under construction on Philipsdam

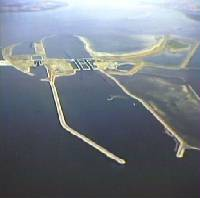
the lake Krammer and Philipsdam

The Philipsdam is a compartmentalisation dam constructed as part of the Delta Works in the Netherlands. It separates water of the lakes Krammer and Volkerak from the Oosterschelde, and connects the Grevelingendam to Sint Philipsland.

== History, design, and construction ==
=== Design and optioneering ===
==== The need for the dam ====
In 1974, it was decided by Rijkswaterstaat and the Den Uyl cabinet to construct the Oosterscheldekering as a storm surge barrier at the mouth of the Oosterschelde, instead of completely closing off the tidal inlet at that location. The construction of the Oosterscheldekering required the compartmentalisation of the basin.

The compartmentalisation model chosen involved the construction of the Philipsdam, the Oesterdam, and a discharge channel for managing the level and quality of the lake that would then form behind the dams. The overall project was also required to create a freshwater lake for water management purposes, ensure a tide-free navigation on the Scheldt-Rhine connection, and achieve a tidal difference of 2.7m at Yerseke.

==== Optioneering and preliminary design ====
To prevent unacceptable flow velocities from being realised in the Scheldt-Rhine Canal during the works, the closing phases of both the Philipsdam and the Oesterdam had to be coordinated with each other. A number of alternatives to the final location of the Philipsdam and the lock complex were investigated, with an important consideration being the preservation of valuable intertidal areas along with considerations of the closure method to be employed.

The decision-making process for the nature and location of the Philipsdam involved a comprehensive consideration of multiple factors, leading to the selection of the variant at a sandbank known as Plaat van de Vliet as the preferred option. Key considerations included: The connection of the dam to the Grevelingendam instead of the southern shore of Goeree-Overflakkee was chosen to allow for the option of turning the Grevelingenmeer into a freshwater basin by feeding it via a discharge sluice from the Krammer, which was ultimately decided against. The benefit of this route is that it also removed the requirement for an additional road bridge across the Krammer instead connecting it to the existing road over the Grevelingendam.

- Hydrology and soil mechanics: The Plaat van de Vliet option was favoured for its hydrological aspects, which were thought to cause minimal disruption to flow speeds in the Krammer during construction. The flow speeds in the Krammer were expected to increase by 20% as long as the Slaak was still open, due to the construction of the work island with salt control basins on the Plaat van de Vliet. The increase in flow speeds along the sandbank known as the Plaat van Oude Tonge was anticipated to be less than 10%. No significant impact was expected on the Zijpe. Soil mechanics considerations favoured an eastern connection to St.-Philipsland to ensure the stability of the dam and minimise ground settlement risks.

Table: Maximum speeds and volumes
Waterway	Max. Ebb Speed (m/s)	Max. Ebb Volume (m³/s)	Max. Flood Speed (m/s)	Max. Flood Volume (m³/s)
Slaak	0.9	2000	0.75	2000
Krammer	1.05	11000	1.05	12500

- Environmental impact: The decisions on where and how to construct the dam emphasised preserving valuable mudflats and minimising environmental disruption. The Plaat van de Vliet variant, with an eastern connection to St.-Philipsland, was preferred for its ability to preserve a significant portion of valuable mudflats along St.-Philipsland's shore, balancing the need for tidal influence and freshwater impact.
- Water management: The compartmentalisation aimed at separating fresh and saltwater areas, with specific attention to the salt load from the Philipsdam on the future fresh Zoommeer lake. Options for connecting locks to a supply canal to limit salt penetration were also explored.
- Navigation and transportation: The chosen variant ensured a clear navigational route and considered the impact on traffic flows. It provided favourable access to the Scheldt-Rhine connection and allowed for an optimal separation between professional and recreational navigation.
- Recreational and agricultural considerations: Preferences were given to variants that supported recreational opportunities on the Zoommeer and adjacent areas, and that minimised impact on agricultural land use and the landscape.
- Technical and cost considerations: The chosen option allowed for the construction of a lock complex on an island, requiring careful logistical planning for accessibility and construction. Cost differences between variants were not deemed significant, with a preference for solutions that provided a balance of benefits across these various factors.

The road connection on the south side of the dam required significant research during the design stage, as it runs through vulnerable nature reserves.

=== Construction ===
Construction on the Philipsdam commenced in 1976, starting with the creation of a 96-hectare temporary work island on a sandbank known as Plaat van de Vliet.

Eighteen months after initiation, the island's construction concluded, paving the way for the commencement of the locks aimed at facilitating inland navigation and accommodating yachts. By 1983, the Krammer locks complex was completed, and the dam was officially inaugurated on 2 February 1987. A second lock for yachts was added in 1994.

The Philipsdam functions as a dam, a fresh-salt water separator, and a lock system. It mitigates tidal influences within the Scheldt-Rhine connection, ensuring the Port of Antwerp remains accessible. To the dam's west lies saltwater, while to its east, freshwater flows from the Waal and Bergse Maas.

On the dam's saltwater side, the Oosterschelde's water level is maintained, ensuring the conservation of salt marshes and mudflats vital for oyster farming. The freshwater side supports extensive vegetation due to its drier conditions. The inclusion of a lock complex facilitates the passage of ships, featuring an innovative system for fresh-salt water separation.

In addition to the main road over the crest of the dam, there is a parallel road on its eastern side which was constructed to offer access to recreational zones. The dam's southern route was deliberately positioned as far west as possible from the Plaat van Vliet and Krammerse Slikken, maximising the recreational potential of these mudflats. Efforts were made to preserve the ecological and tidal areas of the Slaak (the region between the dam and the northern side of Sint Philipsland), while minimising the impact on agricultural land in Sint Philipsland. The Krammer wind farm is located around the dam.

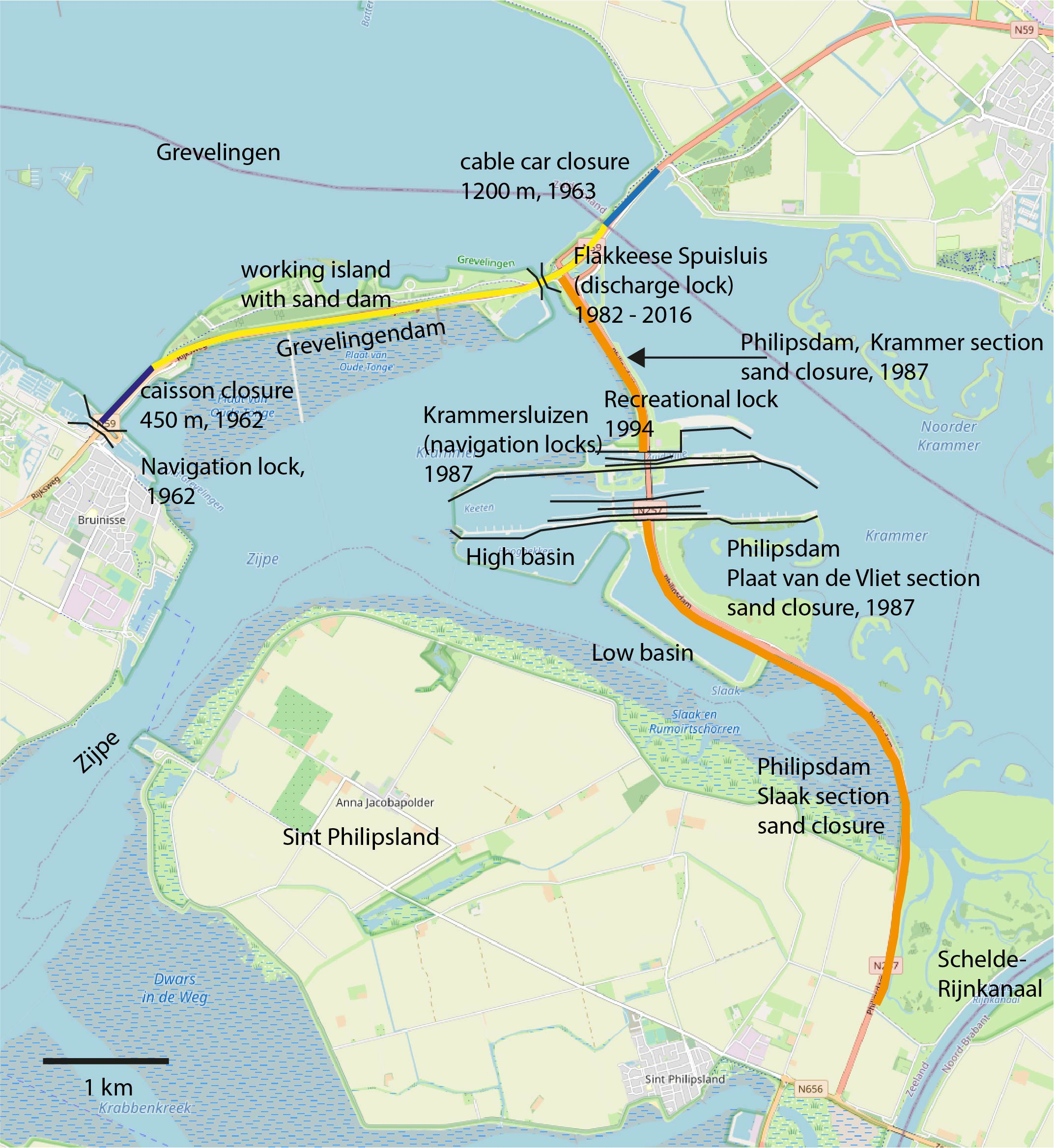
Location of the Philipsdam works, highlighting the adjacent Flakkeese Spuisluis and the Grevelingendam.

== Locks ==
The locks are technically sophisticated because they must avoid the exchange between the freshwater Volkerak and the brackish water of the Oosterschelde. The locks are designed so that there is no influx of saltwater that enters the Volkerak and only a little fresh water in the Oosterschelde. The locks rely on the physical principle that saltwater is denser and sinks, while freshwater rises. By a complex system of pipes and pumps, the saltwater is pumped from the bottom, or conversely, freshwater is pumped from the top, depending on the direction of the ship. Locks on inland waterways are 280 metres long and 24 metres wide.

== Environmental impacts ==
The dam considerably changed the surrounding landscape. Shortly after closure, the water became fresh and the level in the Krammer-Volkerak was fixed at zero centimeters NAP (Amsterdam Ordnance Datum). As a result, nearly two thousand hectares of salt marshes, mudflats, and sandflats permanently dried out. Shoreline erosion was mitigated by constructing foreshores. In the 1990s, around forty islands were created that are of great importance for coastal breeding birds, meaning that the alluvial tidal marsh now supports rich animal life. An observation hut was installed to facilitate the observation of the many species of birds, such as the pied avocet.

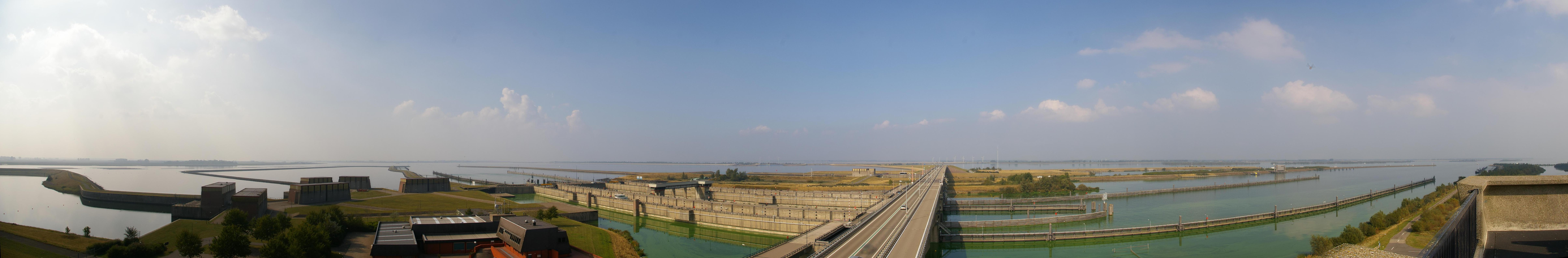
Panoramic view of the Philipsdam

== See also ==
- Delta Works
- Flood control in the Netherlands
- Rijkswaterstaat
