= Compartmentalisation dam =

Hydraulic engineering structure used to divide a body of water into two parts

A compartmentalisation dam is a dam that divides a body of water into two parts. A typical use of such a dam is the regulation of water levels separately in different sections of a basin. One application of a compartmentalisation dam is to facilitate closures of areas with multiple tidal inlets, such as in the case of the Delta Works.

== Compartmentalisation dams employed as a watershed ==
Compartmentalisation dams have been deployed in scenarios where there is a significant disparity in water quality across different basins, where separation is used to address undesirable conditions. Such structures play a crucial role in water management by creating physical barriers between bodies of water with differing qualities. Noteworthy examples include the following compartmentalisation dams in the Netherlands:

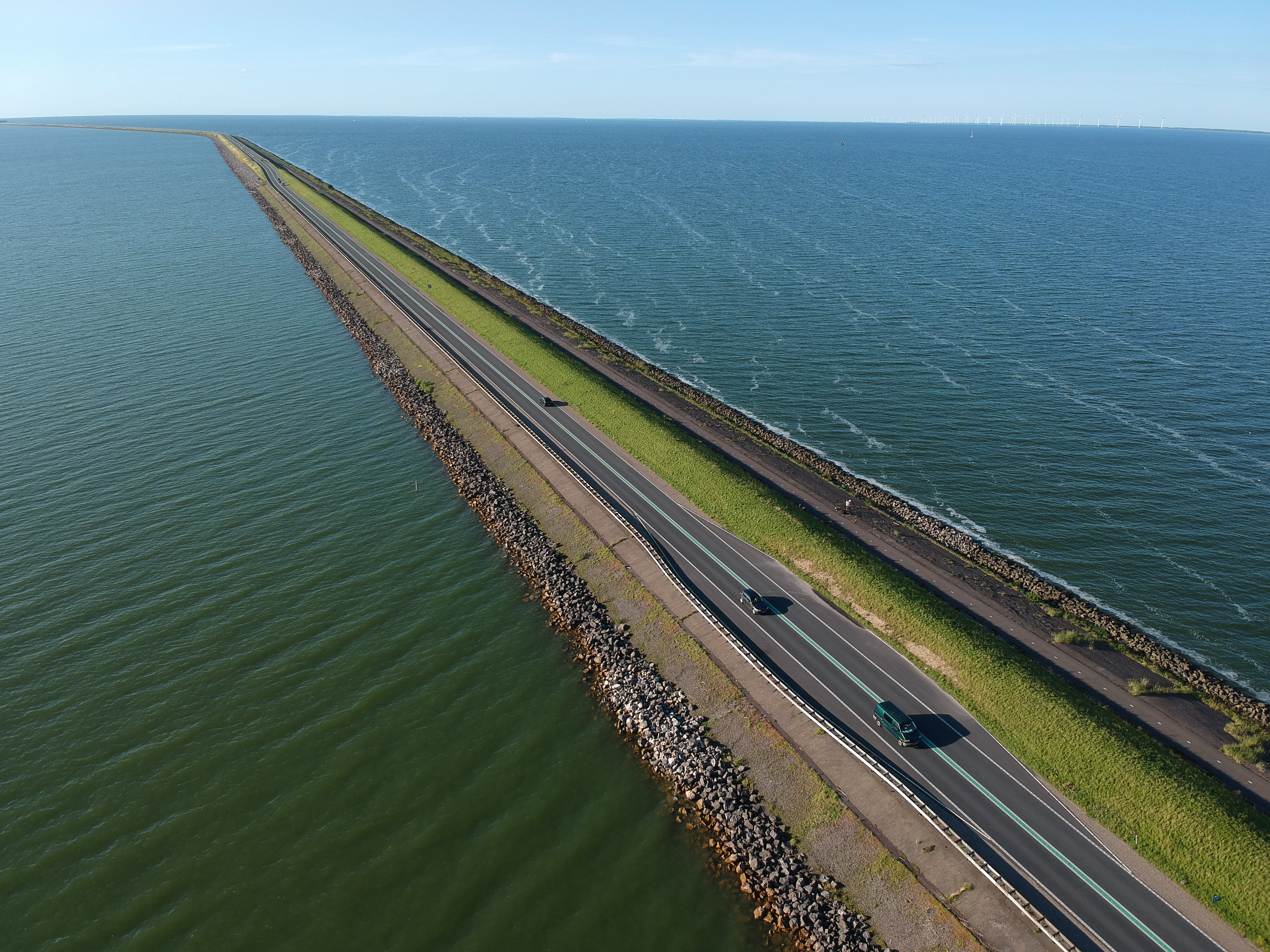
Houtribdijk

- Volkerakdam: This dam was constructed to prevent saltwater intrusion into the freshwater Haringvliet, and to protect the relatively pristine Oosterschelde area from being contaminated by the polluted waters of the Rhine.
- Houtribdijk: Initially built as the northern boundary for the Markerwaard, it now functions to delineate the waters between the Markermeer and IJsselmeer. Furthermore, the Houtribdijk mitigates the impact of wind fetch under certain wind conditions, which in turn reduces wave formation and wind setup within the basin.
- Oesterdam: Erected to facilitate a tide-free navigational route from Antwerp to Rotterdam, the Oesterdam also narrows the tidal basin of the Oosterschelde. This constriction ensures that the tidal range at Yerseke and Zierikzee remains significant, even following the construction of the Oosterscheldekering.

== Role of compartmentalisation dams in Dutch closure projects ==
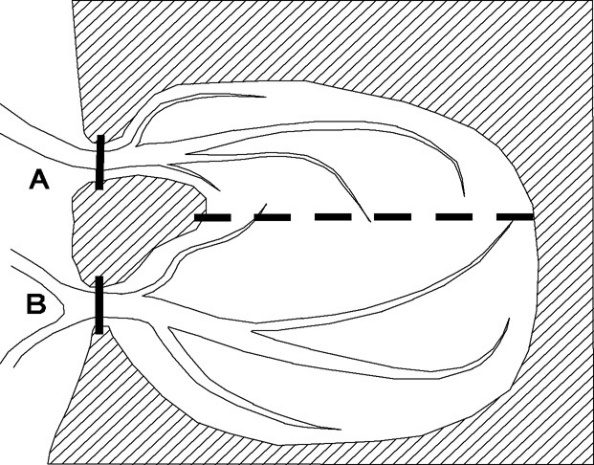
Illustration of a compartmentalisation dam requirement

In regions with tidal influences where closure dams are essential and multiple tidal inlets are present, the establishment of a compartmentalisation dam becomes crucial. Without such a structure (represented by the dotted line), Dam A would require the basin to be entirely filled through sea inlet B. This scenario could lead to a significant increase in flow rate at the inlet, causing the channel to widen and deepen, thereby complicating or outright preventing closure.

Constructing a compartmentalisation dam is notably easier in areas over a wantij, a Dutch term denoting a shallow part or tidal divide in a delta system where two tidal currents meet. At these junctures, the converging tides neutralise each other, creating an area with minimal current, facilitating easier dam construction despite the rapid movement of adjacent waters. The wantij serves as a critical navigational feature, offering shelter from strong currents or presenting challenges for vessels with deeper drafts.

After the Storm Surge of 1953, it was decided to close the main inlets in the South-West of the Netherlands: the Oosterschelde, the Brouwershavensche Gat, and the Haringvliet. As these basins are connected to each other, and it is not possible to simply close them one-by-one, prior separation is required. Some notable examples of compartmentalisation dams used to implement such separation as part of the Delta Works project in The Netherlands include:

- Volkerakdam: separates the Haringvliet basin from the Volkerak.
- Grevelingendam: separates the Oosterschelde basin from the Grevelingen.
- Zandkreekdam: separates the Oosterschelde basin from the Veerse Gat.

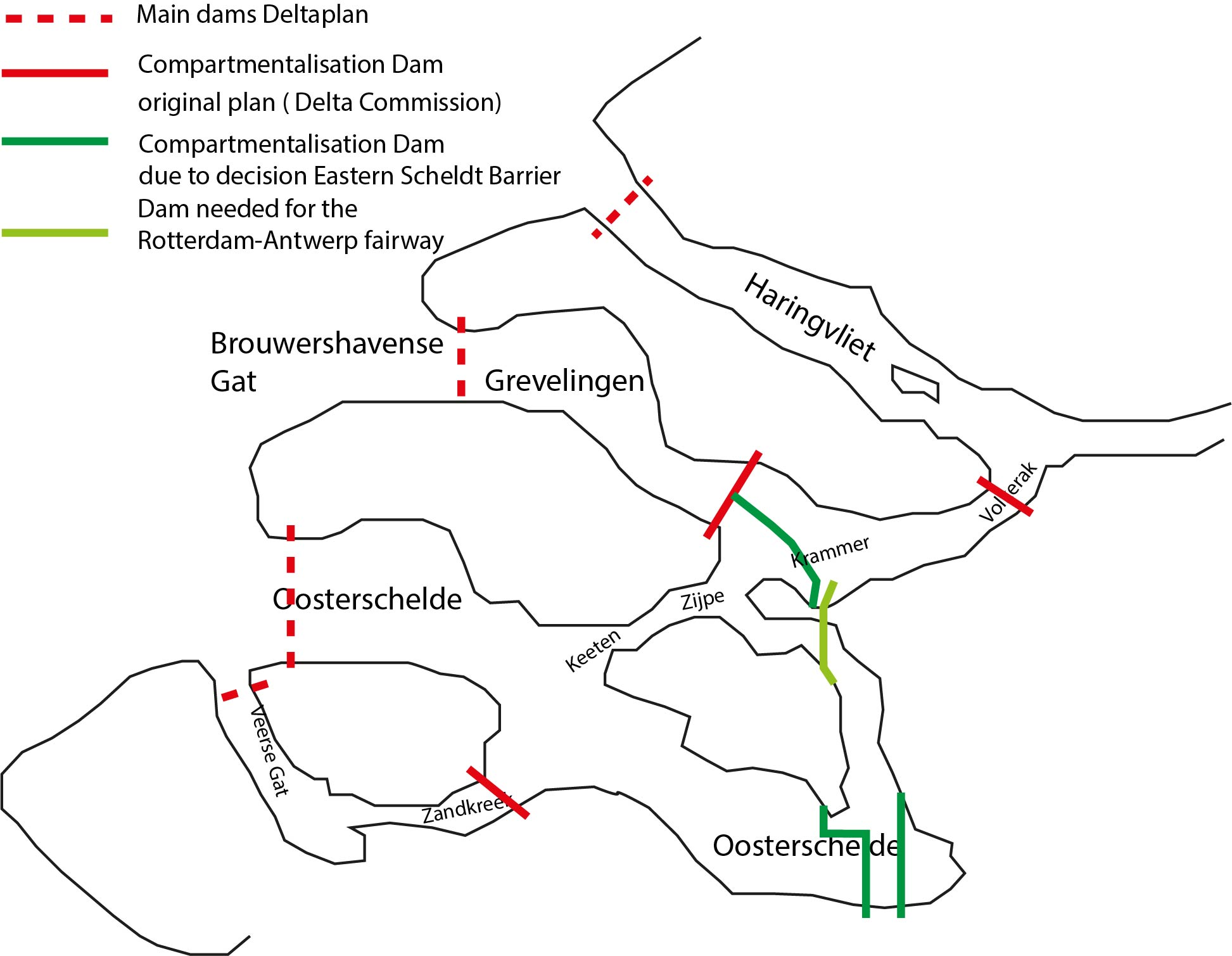
Map of compartmentalisation dams in the Netherlands

The Deltacommissie (English: Delta Commission), a governmental expert panel convened to advise on measures to avert disasters like the 1953 flood, described these structures as side dams (Dutch: nevendammen), rather than compartmentalisation dams.

Following the completion of these dams, the original Delta Plan was adapted. Instead of constructing a closure at the Oosterschelde estuary, the plan was revised to include a storm surge barrier, the Oosterscheldekering. This shift affected the dams' intended functions. Initially, the Oosterschelde dam was to transform the area into a vast freshwater body, dubbed the Zeeland Lake, to ensure a tide-free route from Antwerp to Rotterdam. This would have involved lock complexes at both the Volkerakdam and Kreekrakdam.

Due to the non-completion of the Oosterschelde closure and the deferred decision to build a storm surge barrier, the Volkerak remained open, maintaining significant flow rates through the Zijpe channel. This persistent flow led to erosion, necessitating additional protective measures until the completion of the Oosterscheldekering.

== See also ==
- Delta Works
- Flood control in the Netherlands
- Rijkswaterstaat
- Johan van Veen
