= Steven Van Broeckhoven =

Belgian windsufer

Personal information
- Born: 27 September 1985 (age 41)

Surfing career
- Sport: Surfing
- Best year: 2011
- Sponsors: O'Neill, NeilPryde, JP-Australia, Choco Fins
- Major achievements: 1st PWA World Cup Podersdorf 2011 1st EFPT overall 2011

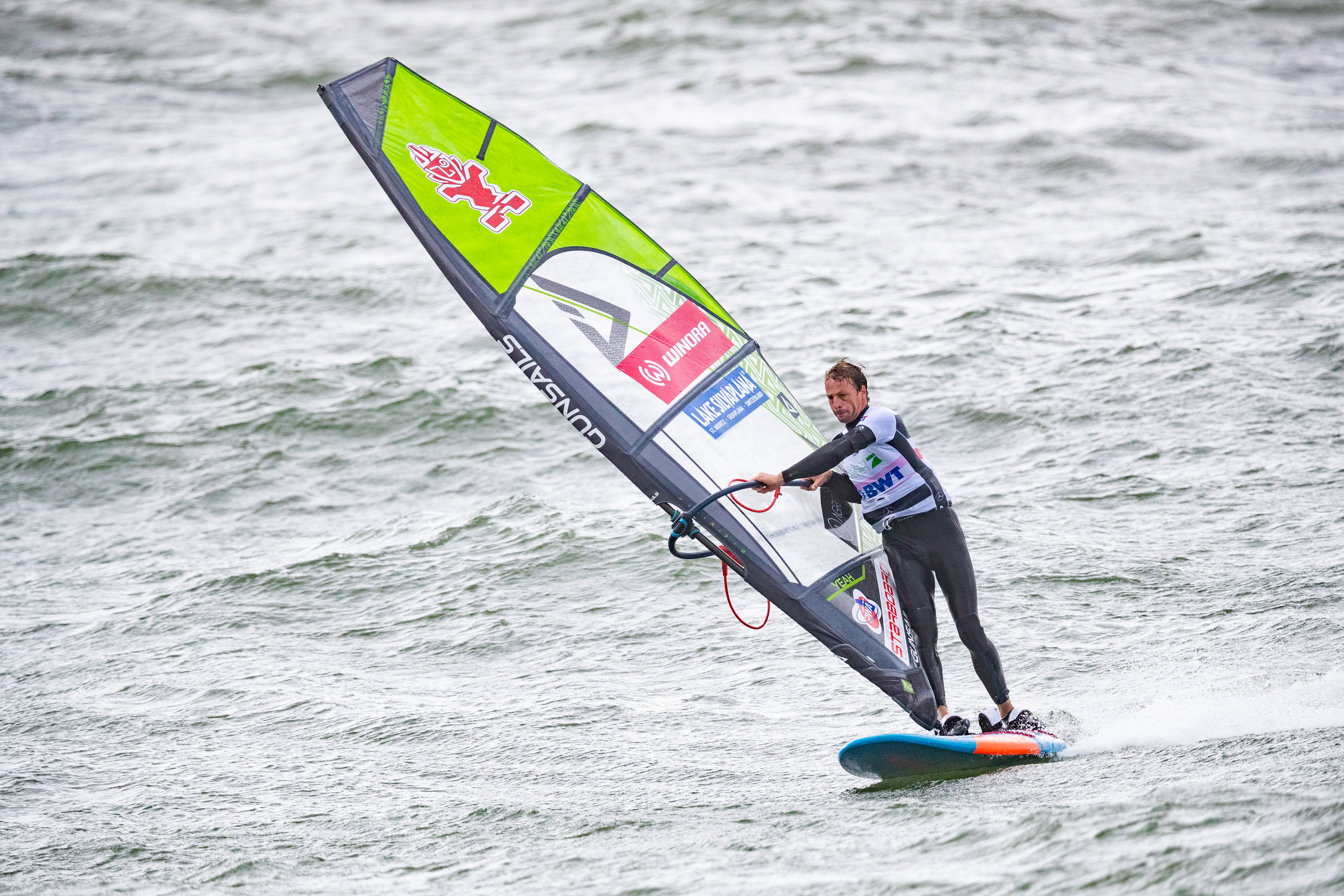

Steven Van Broeckhoven (27 September 1985) is a Belgian windsurfer, specialized in freestyle. In 2010 he was ranked #4 on the PWA overall ranking Freestyle Men.

== Training ==
Steven Van Broeckhoven began windsurfing at the Vossemeren in Lommel, Belgium. After mastering the basics, he continued his training at Lake Grevelingen in the Netherlands. Today, he trains at Tarifa, Kaapstad and Bonaire, but still considers Lake Grevelingen his homespot.

== Major achievements ==
- 2006
  - 1st Belgian Championship Freestyle Men
  - 1st overall "Sultans of Surf Marokko" Men
  - 4th Pro Kids Bonaire Men
- 2007
  - 1st Overall "O'Neill The Crowning"
  - 1st Dutch Championship Freestyle Try Out Men
  - 1st Belgian Championship Freestyle Men
  - 1st TWF (Tarifa-Spain)
- 2008
  - 1st Dutch Championship Freestyle men
  - 1st Overall "O'Neill The Crowning 2"
  - 4th EFPT overall
- 2009
  - 1st EFPT overall
  - 4th PWA (Worldcup) Sotavento Fuerteventura
  - 6th PWA Costa Teguise, Lanzarote
- 2010
  - 1st EFPT overall
  - 2nd PWA/EFPT Surf Worldcup Podersdorf, Austria
  - 3rd PWA Super Grand Slam, Colgate World Cup Sylt, Germany
  - 3rd PWA Freestyle Grand Slam, Sotavento
  - 3rd PWA Grand Slam, Sotavento Fuerteventura
- 2011
  - 1st PWA Surf World Cup Podersdorf, Austria
  - 1st PWA Surf World Cup Freestyle, overall; WORLDCHAMPION

== Recognition ==
In 2009 Steven Van Broeckhoven was elected as Rookie of the Year by the PWA and in 2011 he won the Zilveren Laurier, which symbolizes the sportsman of the year of Limburg. He was also nominated Yachtsman of the year 2010. On May 4, 2011, Steven Van Broeckhoven has won his first PWA World Cup title. 2011 1st PWA Freestyle, overall
