= Grevelingendam =

Hydraulic engineering structures in the Netherlands

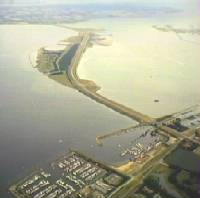
- The Grevelingendam
- Coordinates: 51°40′40″N 4°6′42″E
- Carries: N59 motorway
- Owner: Rijkswaterstaat

Characteristics
- Total length: 6.0 kilometres (3.7 mi)

History
- Engineering design by: Deltadienst
- Construction start: 1958
- Construction end: 1965
- Opened: 1965

Location
- Interactive map of Grevelingendam

The Grevelingendam is a dam located in the Grevelingen sea inlet between Schouwen-Duiveland and Goeree-Overflakkee in The Netherlands. The Grevelingendam was the fourth structure constructed as part of the Delta Works.

The dam is six kilometres in length. Construction began in 1958 with the aim of delivering it in 1964. Due to several setbacks, the construction of the dam took seven years and it was opened on 1 April 1965 by Minister of Transport and Water Management, Jan van Aartsen. There is a navigation lock at the southern end of the dam near Bruinisse, and nearby a control lock using a siphon system, known as the Flakkeese Spuisluis, which connects the Eastern Scheldt with the Grevelingenmeer.

The construction of the Grevelingendam permitted Dutch civil engineers and contractors to gain experience that would be necessary for the Brouwersdam, along with more complicated closure works such as those at the Haringvlietdam, and the Oosterscheldekering.

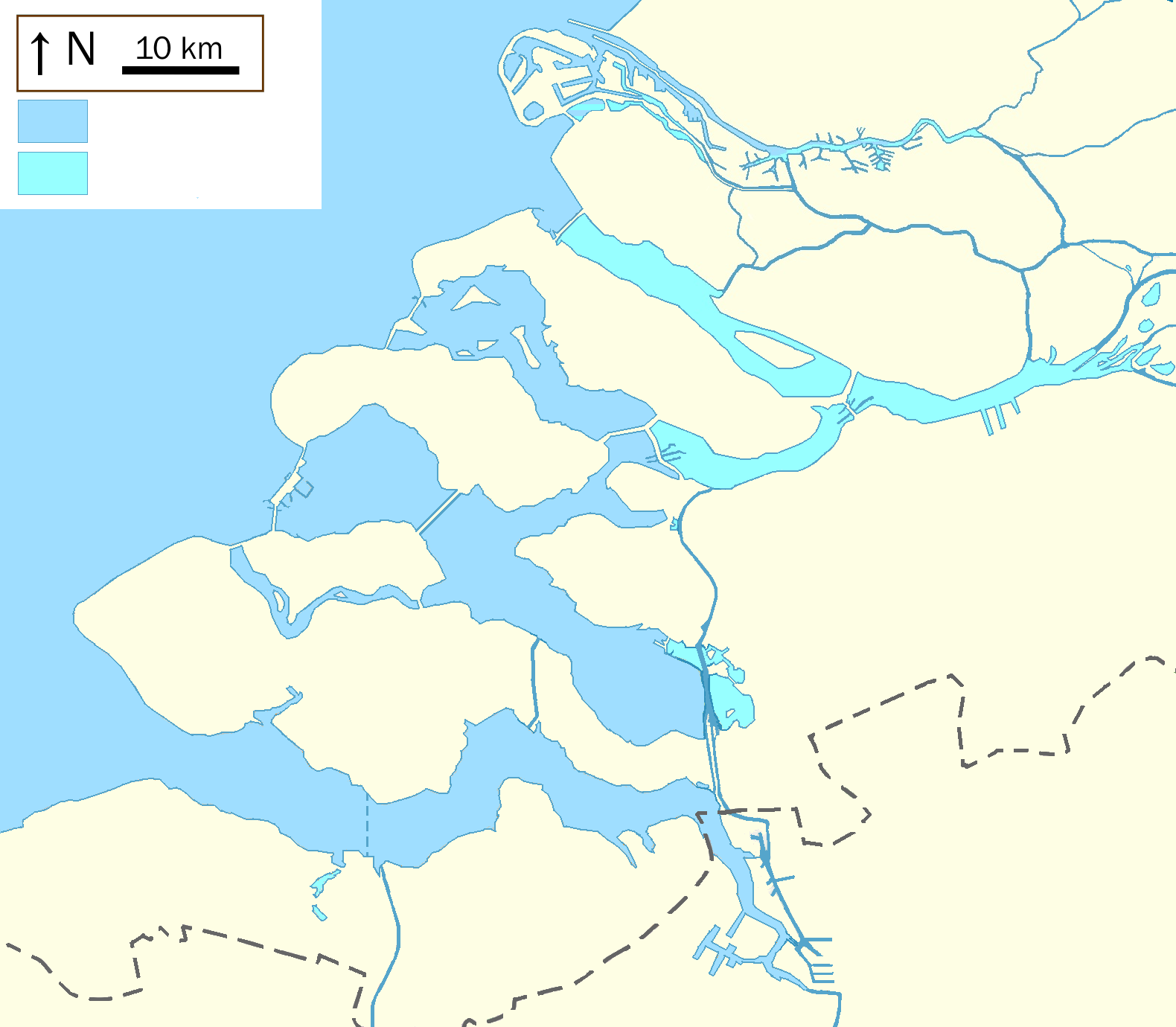
Delta Works

== Feasibility, planning and design ==
Being part of the Delta Works scheme, the Grevelingendam works were conceived in response to the North Sea flood of 1953, as a result of which it was decided to close the inlets in Zeeland and South Holland. The Grevelingendam was not a specific requirement of the Dutch Delta Act of 1958 and is not primarily intended to protect against flooding. Rather, as was the case with two other Delta Works projects (the Volkerakdam and the Zandkreekdam), the Grevelingendam was designed as a secondary compartmentalisation dam with the goal of reducing tidal current velocities in four surrounding estuaries, thereby permitting easier subsequent construction of the primary dams of the Haringvlietdam, the Brouwersdam and the Oosterscheldekering.

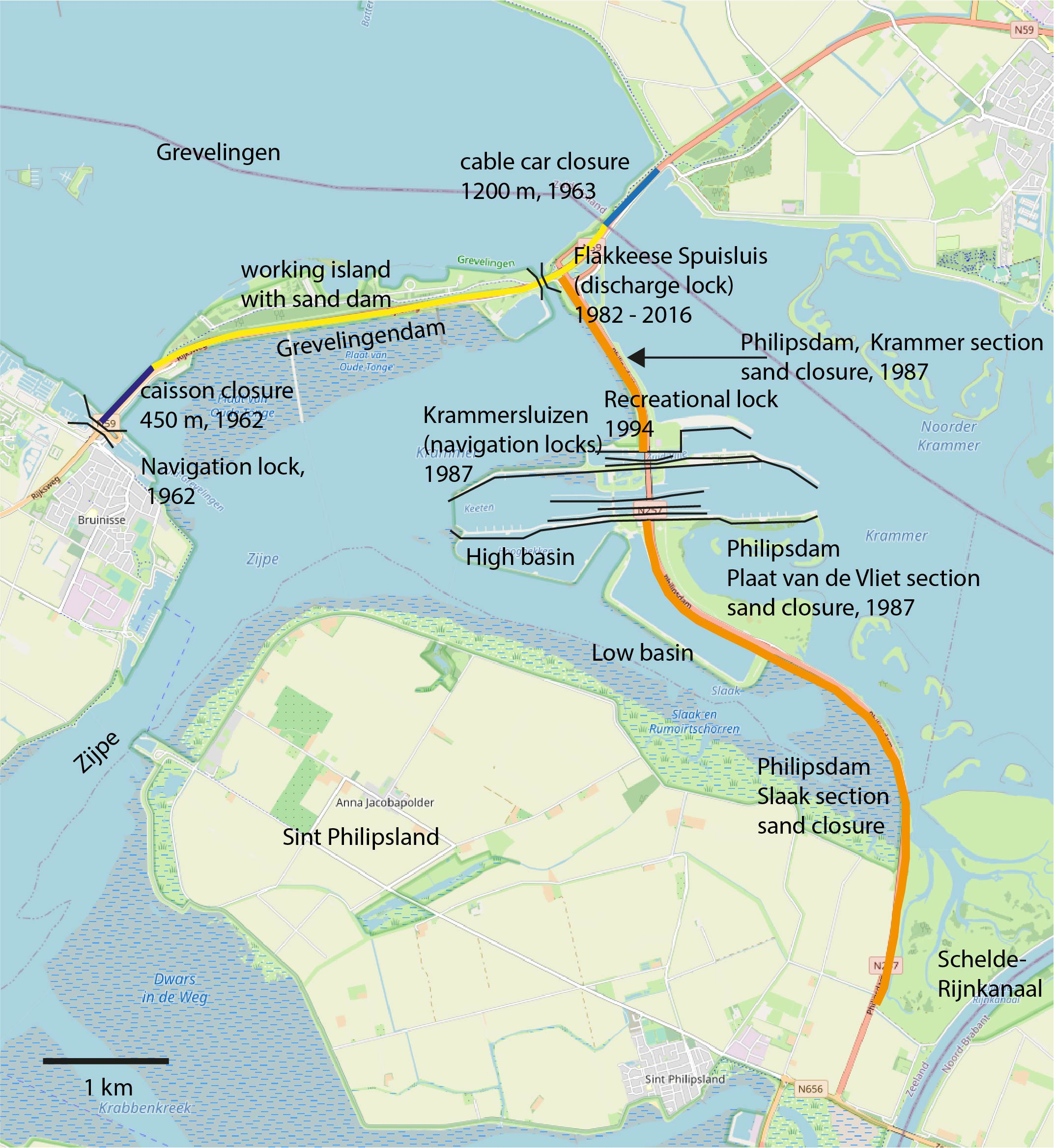
Location of the Grevelingendam works, showing the adjacent Flakkeese Spuisluis and the Philipsdam

The location of the dam had a major influence on the construction schedule. The dam is founded over much of its length on a sandbank known as the Plaat van Oude Tonge, which dries out at low tide. Between the south side of the dam and the lock, which is situated on the bank of Schouwen-Duiveland, the dam crosses a gully up to 25 metres in depth. Between the north side of the Plaat van Oude Tonge and the bank at Goeree-Overflakkee, the dam crosses a shallower, 1000 metre-wide network of gullies.

The height of the western part of the dam (the 'crown line') over the Plaat van Oude Tonge is 5.5 metres above Amsterdam Ordnance Datum (Normaal Amsterdams Peil, NAP). This high crest line is necessary due to large wave run-up, with the dike designed to permit some flooding at very high water levels. Space was reserved on the crown of the dam for the conversion of the N59 into a four-lane motorway, with a parallel road for other traffic. Due to a policy change in the 1970s, the four-lane motorway was never built.

The hydraulic investigations undertaken at the design stage had shown that it was desirable to have the closure of the southern channel at the Schouwen-Duiveland coast precede the closing of the northern channel near Goeree-Overflakkee. The following construction schedule was therefore planned:

- 1961: Construction of the dam section on the Plaat van Oude Tonge and commencement of works in the southern channel.
- 1962: Closure of the southern channel and construction of the dam section through it. Commence construction in the northern channels.
- 1963: Closure of the northern channels and construction of the dam section.

== Construction: Southern channel caisson closure ==
The dam closure at the southern channel was achieved using a system of caissons, with a number of the caissons that had been used for the emergency closures immediately after the North Sea flood disaster of 1953 repurposed for use. In addition to new caisson units made specially for the Grevelingendam project, a caisson unit which had been intended for use on the closure of the Brielse Maasdam in 1950 was also used. The caissons were floated to the closing gap, being transported in units of five. Before the closure, abutments were placed on both sides of the dam, composed of two caissons on the south side and three caissons on the north side, which were connected to the top of the dam sections.

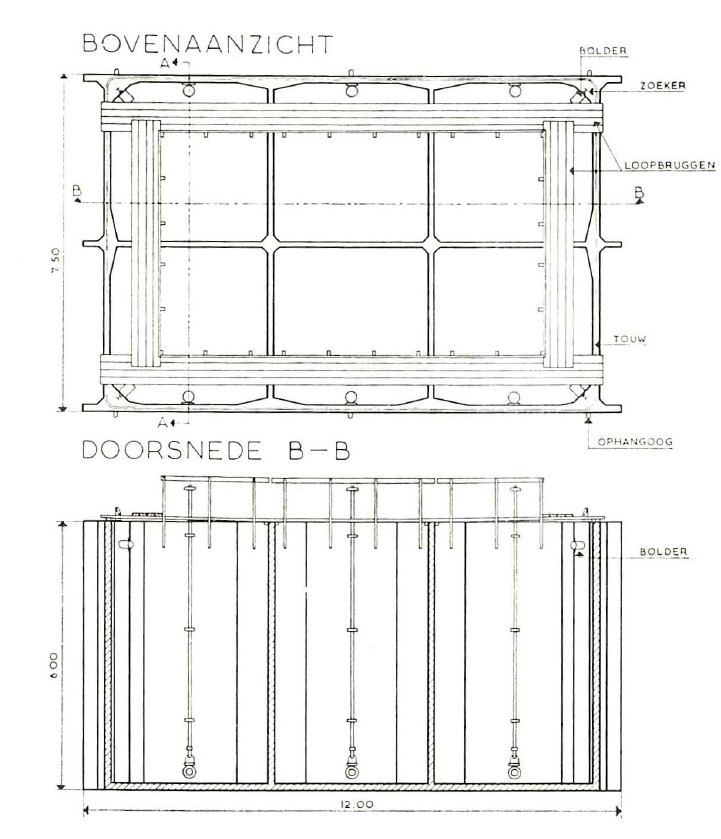
Engineering drawing of some of the caissons used in the closure works

When closing large gaps using caissons, the units must be placed in the closing hole during slack water, which in most cases occurs at the moment of tidal reversal (at or around the times of high water and low water). However, in the Grevelingenmeer, there were more than two turnarounds as a result of the fact that the currents in the closing gap were influenced by tides from the Oosterschelde and the Brouwershaven Gap.

The flow velocities in the closing area were therefore analysed and calculated in detail for the various caisson sinking phases, using the Deltar analogue computer, which had just been developed at the time. The time available during the turnaround made it impossible to sink the caissons individually. Therefore, two or three caissons were connected together and sunk at the same time.

During the sinking manoeuvres, the caissons were guided by a firmly anchored floating crane. After they had been sunk, armourstone was installed along the front and rear of the caissons by a stone dumping vessel (on the sea side of the dam) and a floating crane on the river side. After pouring concrete to the caisson units, the remaining elements were placed using a floating sheerleg. The unit caissons had a height of 6 metres, with the extensions being 2 metres in height. The threshold level at the closing gap was around 5 metres below sea level (Amsterdam Ordnance Datum) with the concrete barrier terminating 8 metres above this.

== Construction: Northern channel closure using cable-way ==
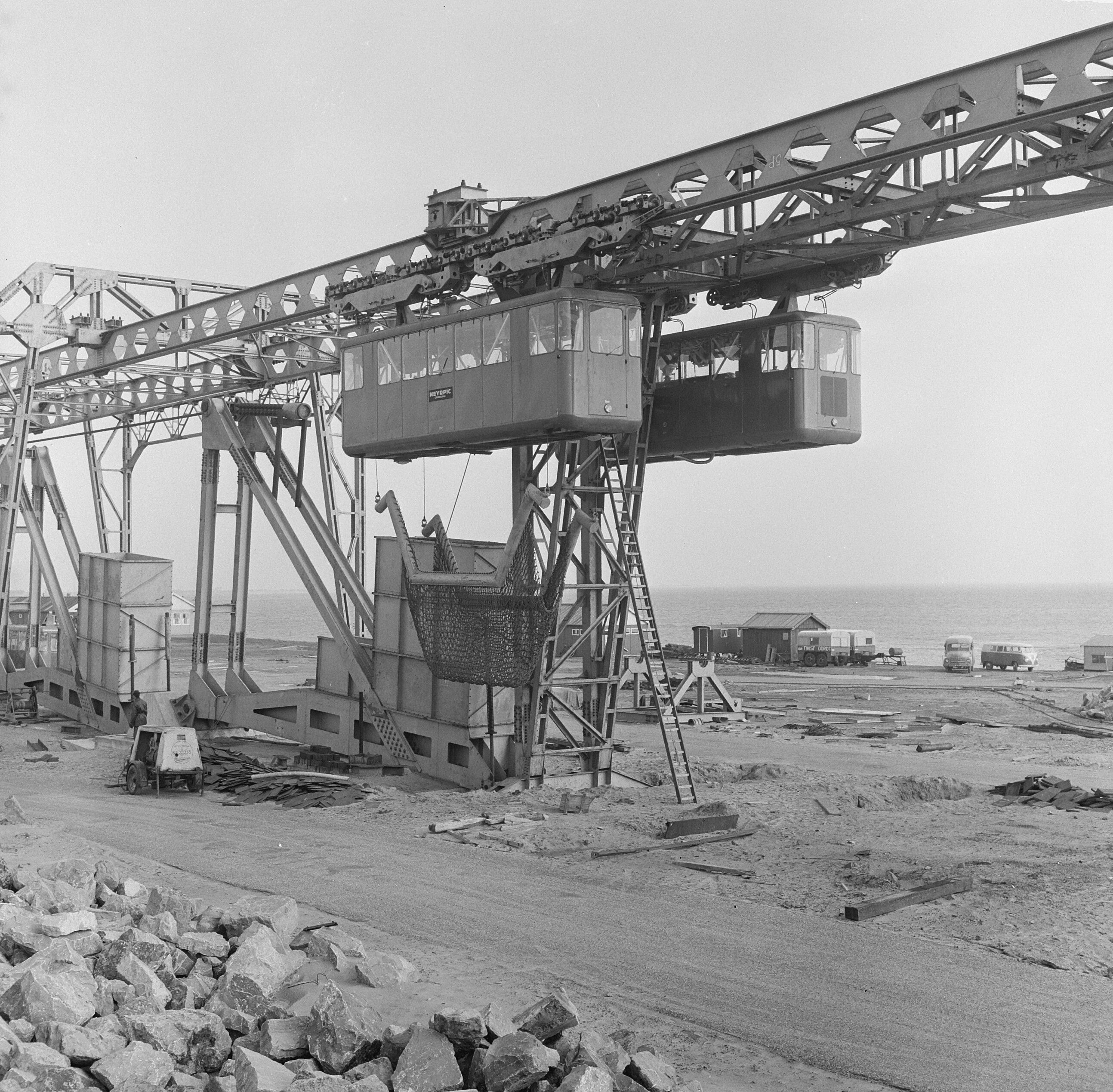
Cable car system used on the northern channel closures

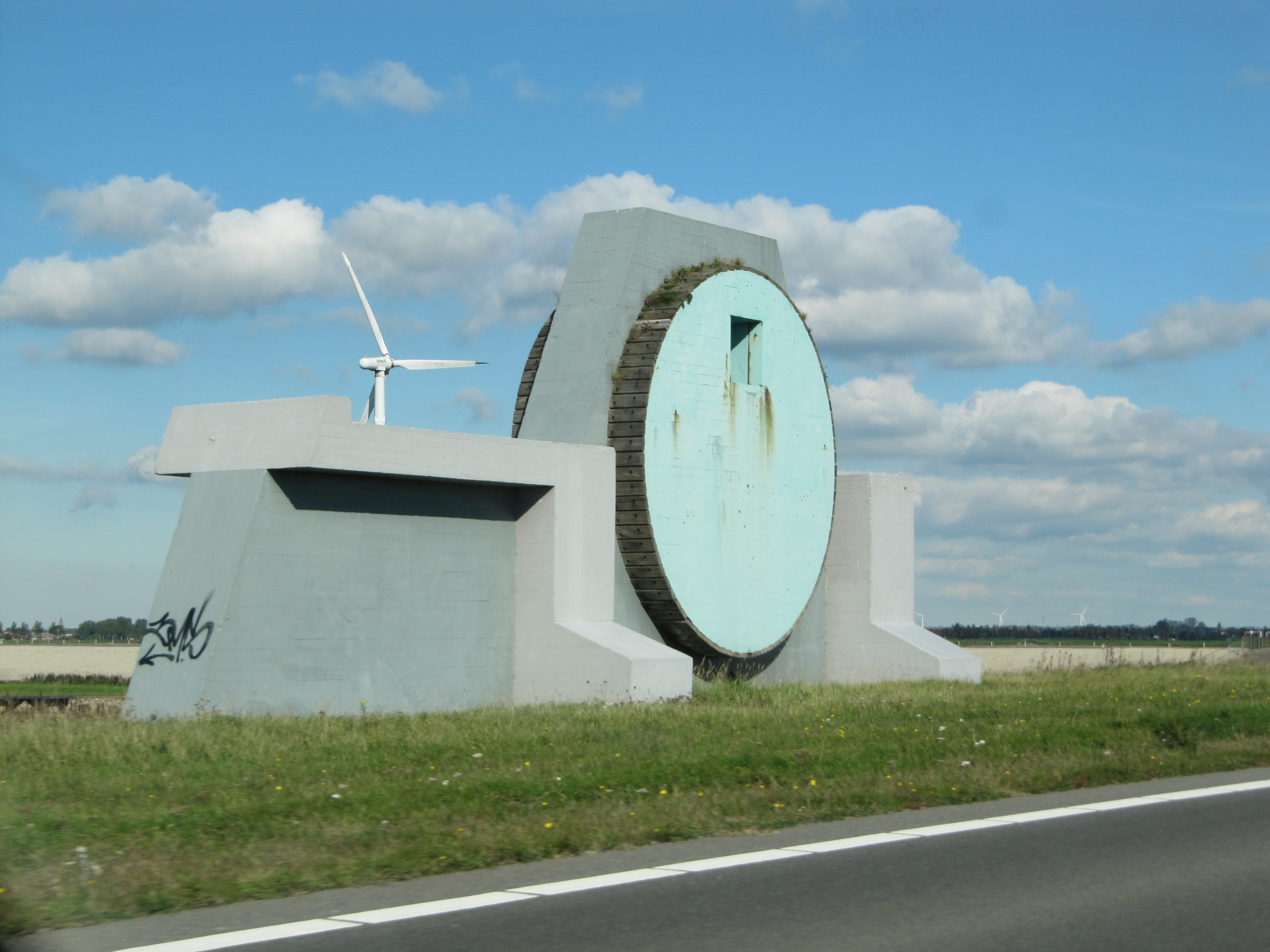
The cable car anchor block has been retained as a monument to the construction

The shallow nature of the northern channel permitted a more gradual closure, with the use of a 1.9 kilometre long cable car system. The advantage of a gradual vertical closure is that flow velocities are limited, resulting in a reduction in the magnitude of scour holes either side of the dam. Another advantage of the cable car solution was that only a single pylon was required in the centre of the channel. The cable car system was designed by Rijkswaterstaat in combination with the French company Neyrpic, and used self-propelled cars and a one-way system to optimise capacity.

A threshold at the base of the dam in the northern channels was poured in 1962, along with a dike section from Goeree-Overflakkee. The remaining length, of approximately 1200 metres, was constructed by the cable car method. The cableway consisted of two carrying cables, with the last sections terminating at a turntable, along which the cars could pass from one side to the other. The cables were attached to a fixed anchor point on the north-east side of the closure, which has been preserved as a monument to the construction, and to a tilting counterweight on the opposite side. The units and stone placed by the cars were transported by four steel hopper barges, being lifted and lowered by the cars. A production rate of 360 tonnes of stone per hour was achieved.

The channels were closed using the method of gradual closing, partly because loosely packed sand in the substrate could lead to settlement issues, and partly to gain experience with the use of a cable-way. Using the cable-way stone was dumped on a threshold covered with fascine mattresses, polyethylene foil, and asphalt mastic. The stone dam was built up in this way to 2.5 metres above NAP, after which sand could begin to be sprayed against the closing dam by dredgers, and the dam body raised. By the autumn of 1965, the Grevelingen Dam was completed.

== The Grevelingenmeer (Lake Grevelingen) ==
With the Grevelingendam complete, the subsequent construction of the Brouwersdam in 1971 created the Grevelingenmeer Lake, which has become a popular water sports location for recreational diving and sea kayaking. Shipping enters the Krammer via the Grevelingen navigation lock at Bruinisse.

In order to maintain the freshwater status of the Grevelingenmeer, a siphon control lock complex was constructed in the Brouwersdam, and later a similar structure was constructed at the Grevelingendam (the Flakkeese Spuisluis). These locks turned out to have more capacity than originally intended, and a decision was made to allow the Grevelingenmeer to remain as a seawater lake, it thus becoming the largest seawater lake in Europe. A connection to the Philipsdam was made at the South Holland end of the Grevelingendam.

== Road and bridge over the dam ==
The N59 runs over the Grevelingendam, with a secondary bridge constructed over the Grevelingen lock to cope with increased traffic volumes.

== Media ==
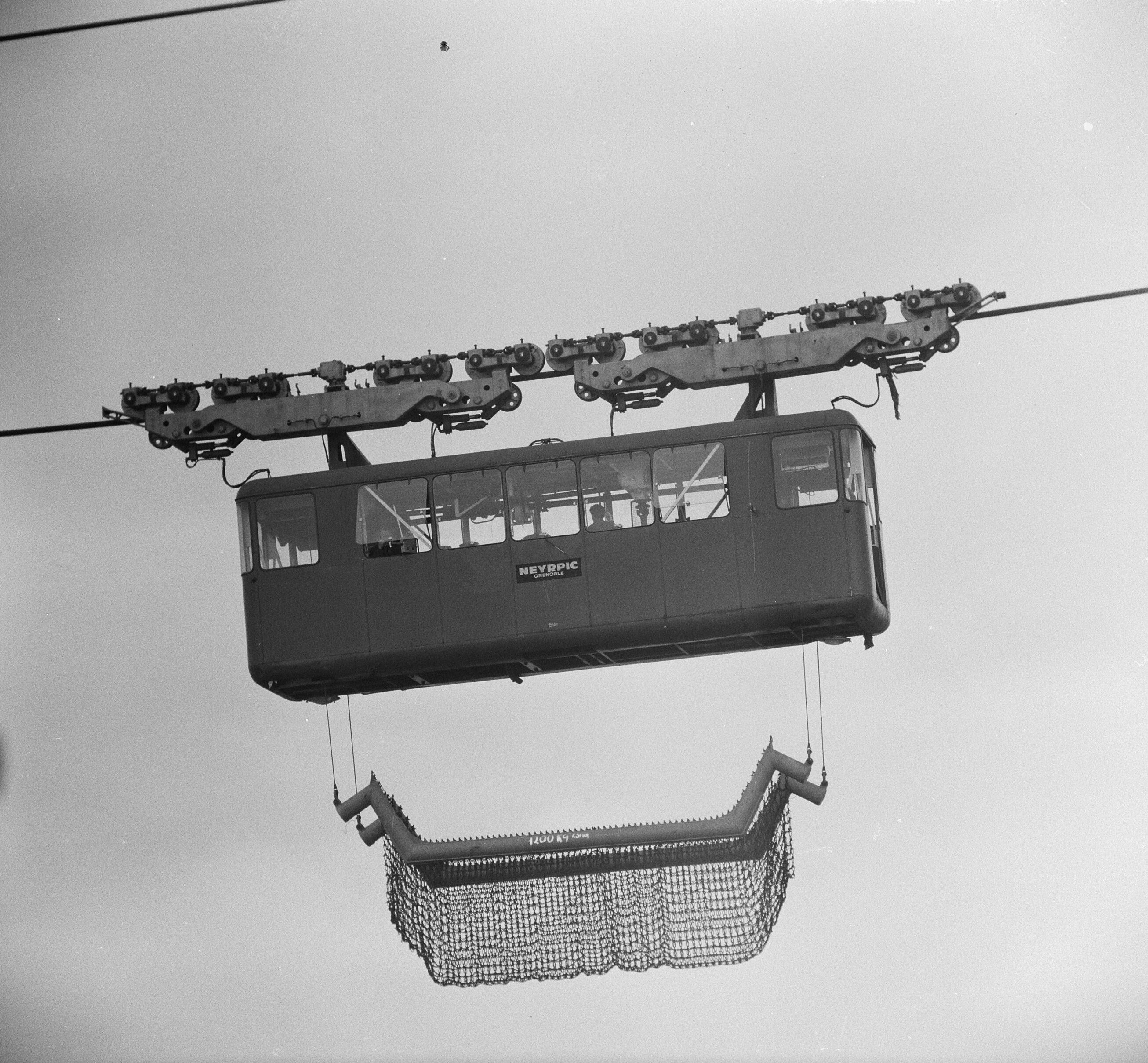
The cable car system in operation on the northern closure

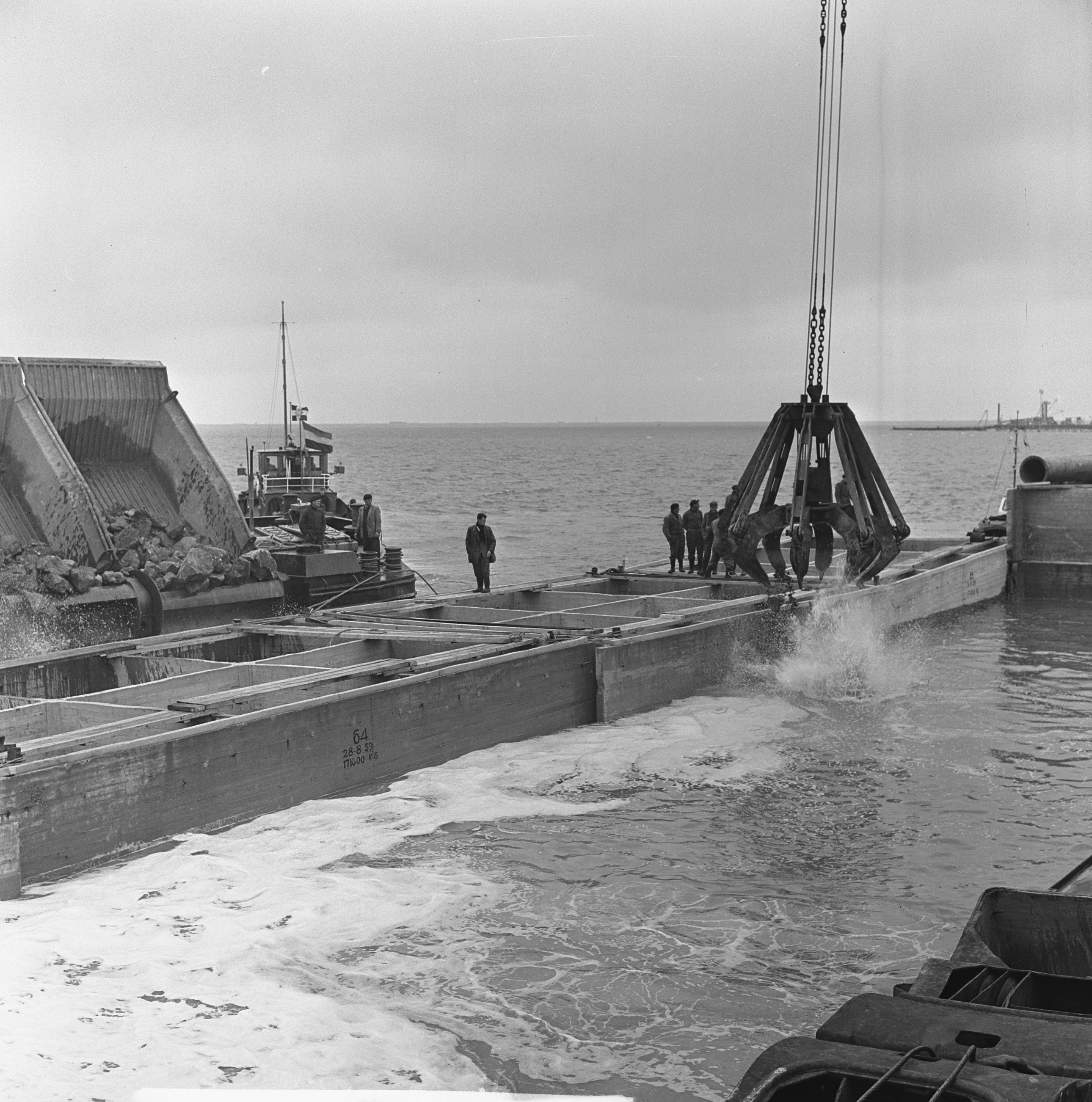
Caissons used in the construction

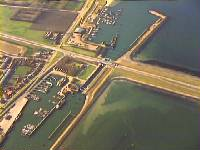
The navigation lock located within the dam structure at the southern end

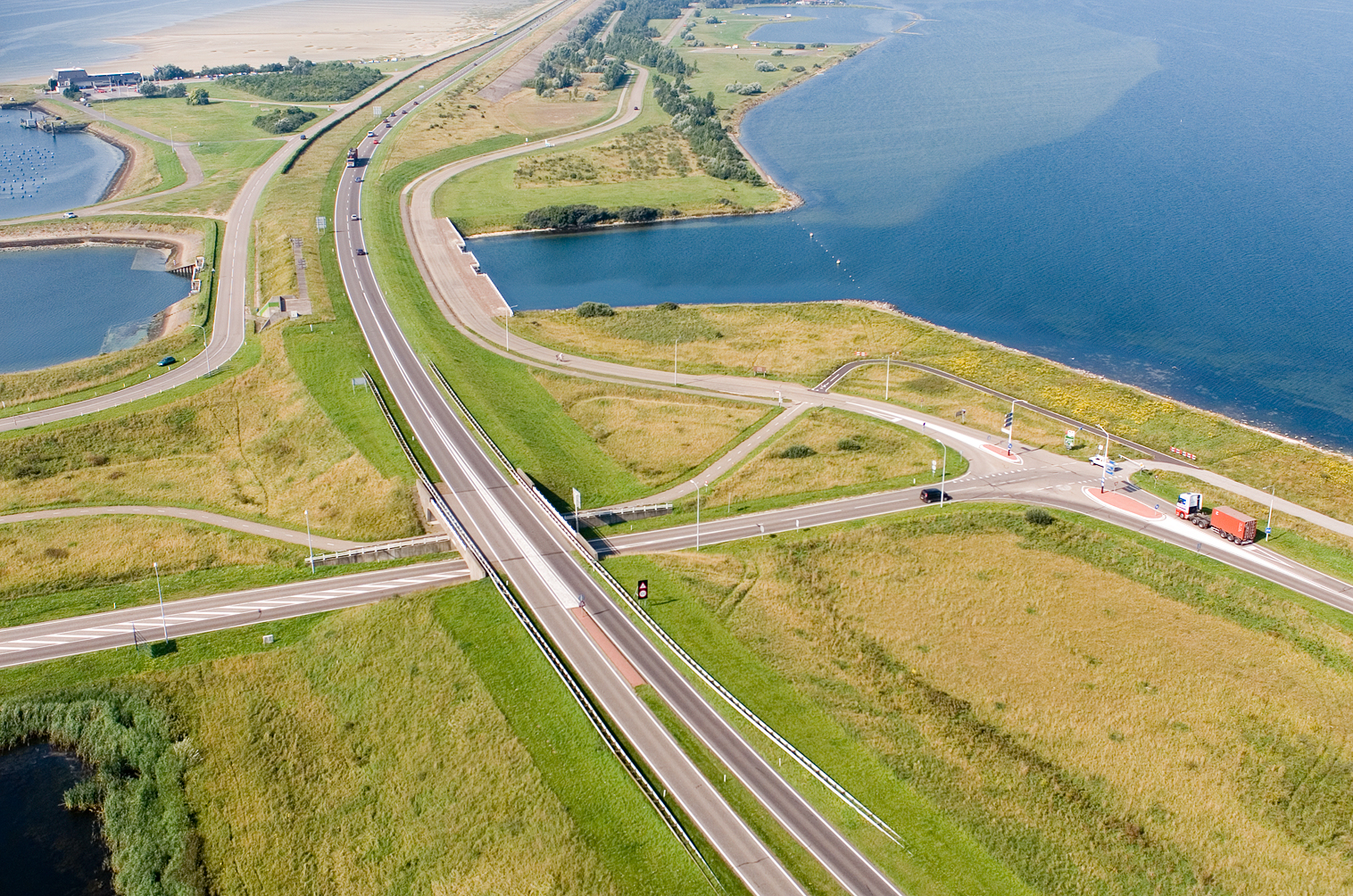
The Flakkeese Spuisluis control lock and sluice complex, adjacent to the dam

== See also ==
- Delta Works
- Flood control in the Netherlands
- Rijkswaterstaat
