= Oesterdam =

Compartmentalisation dam in the Netherlands, part of the Delta Works

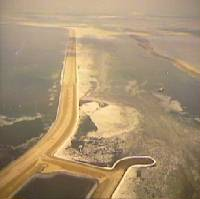
- The Oesterdam
- Coordinates: 51°28′43.4″N 4°13′11.6″E
- Carries: N659 road
- Crosses: Eastern Scheldt Estuary
- Owner: Rijkswaterstaat

Characteristics
- Total length: 10.5 kilometres (6.5 mi)

History
- Engineering design by: Deltadienst
- Constructed by: Several contractors, including: Zanen Verstoep, Baggermaatschappij Holland bv, and Volker Stevin Baggeren
- Construction start: 1979
- Construction end: 1986
- Opened: 1989 (fully open with N569 road constructed over the dam)

Location
- Interactive map of Oesterdam

The Oesterdam (English: Oyster Dam) is a compartmentalisation dam in The Netherlands, situated between Tholen and South Beveland in the eastern part of the Eastern Scheldt. The dam, with a length of 10.5 kilometres, is the longest structure built for the Delta Works. The Oesterdam was necessitated, like the Philipsdam, after the decision was taken to close off the Eastern Scheldt with a storm surge barrier, rather than a solid dam.

For navigation of recreational boats and fishing vessels between the Scheldt–Rhine Canal and the Eastern Scheldt, the dam contains a small lock near its northern end, the Bergse Diepsluis. Located adjacent to the dam near its southern end are a pair of large locks, the Kreekraksluizen, constructed to separate the canal's brackish water to the south from the freshwater to the north.

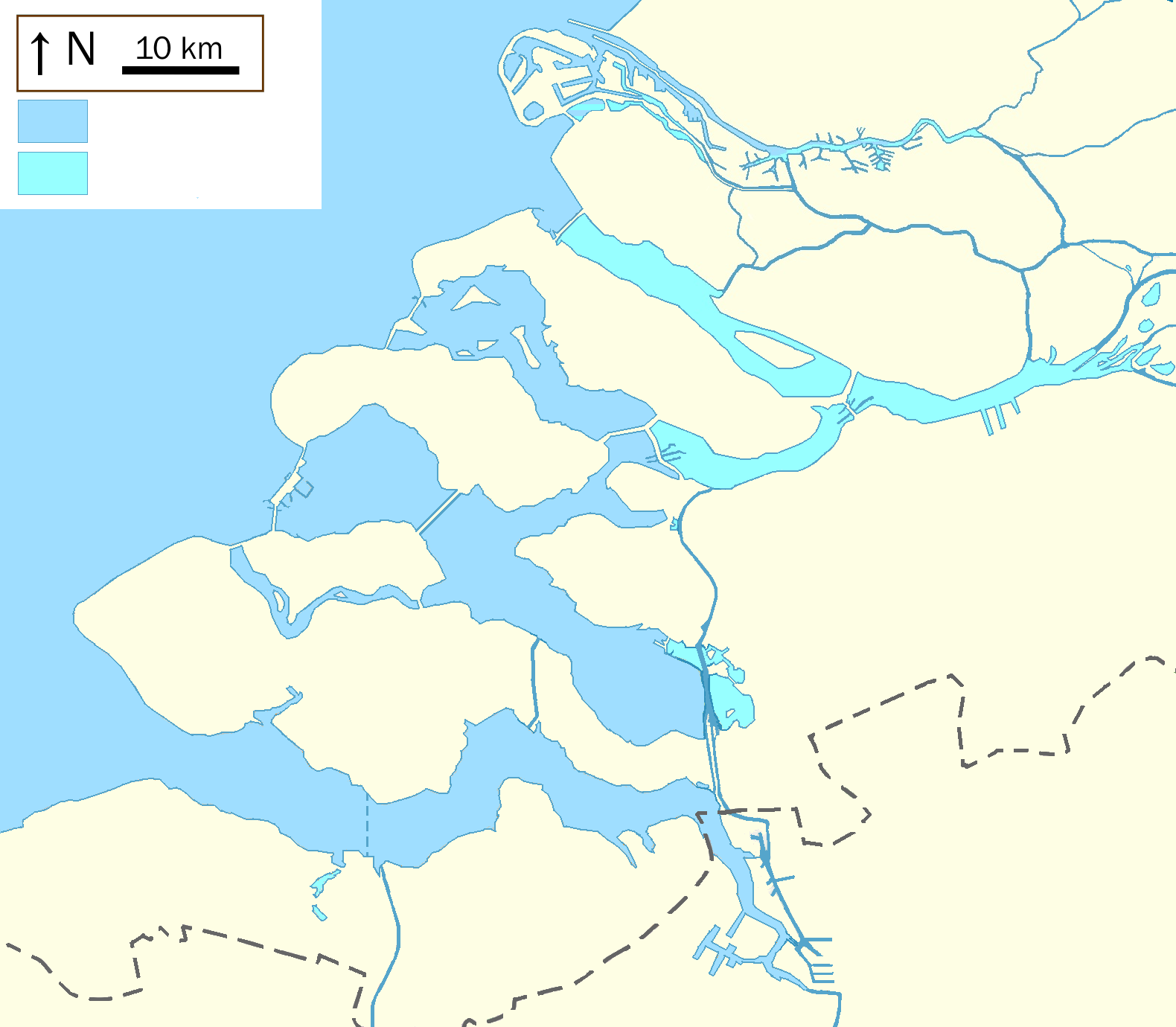
Delta Works

== Design background ==
The Oesterdam was not originally part of the planned Delta Works, but rather is one of the compartmentalisation dams which became necessary when it was decided not to close off the Eastern Scheldt, but to provide it with a permeable barrier.

The reduced tidal movement in the estuary associated with this decision meant that, to achieve sufficient tidal movement, the surface area of the Eastern Scheldt would have to be reduced. This was achieved by the construction of compartmentalisation dams: the Markiezaatskade, the Philipsdam, the Volkerakdam, and the Oesterdam.

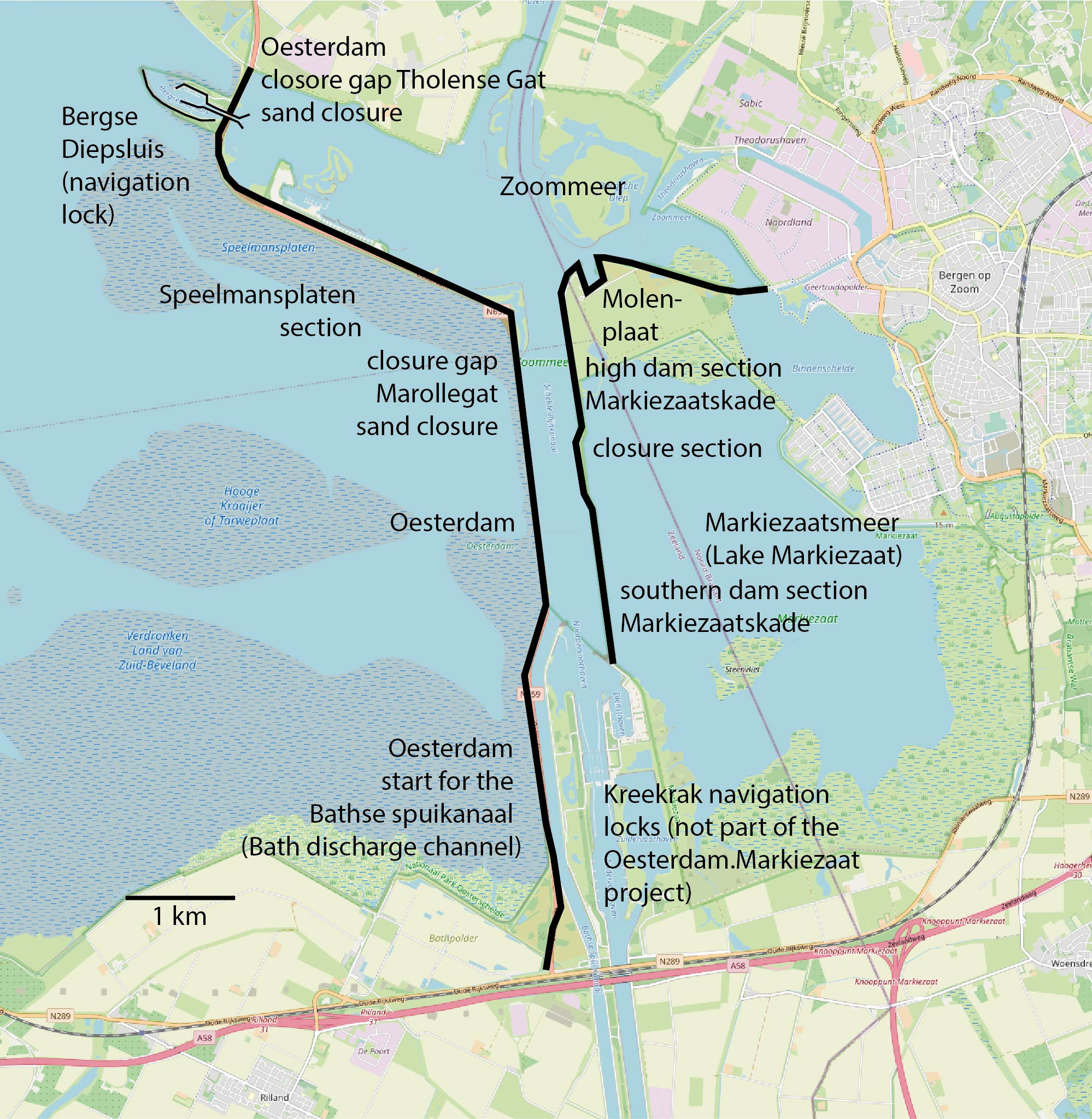
Location of the Oesterdam and the Markiezaatskade

With the construction of the compartmentalisation works, the freshwater Volkerak-Zoommeer was created, with benefits for agriculture. At the same time, a tide-free shipping route was created from the Volkerak locks to Antwerp.

The Commissie Compartimentering Oosterschelde (English: Committee for Compartmentalisation of the Eastern Scheldt) was formed under the aegis of the Dutch Minister of Transport and Water Management. Its mandate included reporting to both the minister and the provincial authorities of Zeeland and North Brabant by 30 April 1975. This report was to cover the technical, planning, and financial considerations of various proposals for compartmentalising the Eastern Scheldt.

The necessity of this committee arose from the need to maintain a substantial tidal difference at Yerseke and to ensure tide-independent inland navigation between Antwerp and Rotterdam, in accordance with an existing treaty with Belgium. The committee evaluated multiple alternatives, each suggesting a unique design for the dam. The chosen plan for the Oesterdam entailed a path from the Scheldt-Rhine Canal through the Bathse polders in a northerly direction, incorporating a separate spillway channel leading to a sluice in the Western Scheldt – the Bathse sluice – along with enhancements to the Canal through South Beveland.

In the initial phases, the Bathse spillway channel's dam body was positioned west of the Kreekrak locks, intended to become operational concurrent with the completion of the Oesterdam. The proposed lock connecting the Zoommeer and the Eastern Scheldt was planned to be situated southwest of the Tholense Gap. This location was selected for its feasibility and its connection to an easily constructible section of the dam over the Speelmansplaten. This configuration resulted in two remaining gaps, the Marollegat and the Tholense Gap, that needed closure.

== Construction ==
Construction began after the completion of the Markiezaatskade dam (1981 - 1983), the tidal effects of the completed dam making the construction of the Oesterdam easier. The initial strategy for the Oesterdam's construction involved using a sand closure for the extensive southern segment up to the new Bergse Diepsluis, and completing the section from the Bergse Diepsluis to Tholen with a cable car and concrete blocks. Construction commenced in 1979 with the establishment of a work island on the Speelmansplaten, which was completed by 1980.

The geotechnical and engineering geology challenges during the construction of the Oesterdam were substantial. The Holocene strata, extending from N.A.P. -5 m to -16 metres, were irregular, consisting of sand, peat, and clay layers of varying thickness. Beneath these, Pleistocene layers included deposits of sand with interspersed clay and shell grit. Towards Speelmansplaten and the Marolle Gap, the Holocene layer's thickness decreased, indicating lesser erosion over time.

In some areas, thick deposits of the Dunkirk clay formation were directly on top of peat, or beneath a sand covering. Significant erosion by the Scheldt river had previously formed a valley in the southernmost 100 meters of the works, which had later filled with a complex mix of clay and sand.

Geotechnical investigations had revealed poor subsoil quality at the Speelmansplaten and Marolle Gap dike sections. To minimise instability risks during construction, various solutions were explored, such as supporting berms, vertical drainage, soil improvement, and phased construction with specific profiles to ensure stability.

For the construction of the dam body, particular attention was paid to the soil structure. The design followed the top of the load-bearing Pleistocene sand. A uniformly wide base width of 76 metres was adopted for simplicity, widened to 110 metres near the last closing gap of the Marolle Gap to minimise instability risks. In the South dike section, the subsoil allowed for direct construction on the existing ground over 100 metres. The termination of the excavation work was strategically planned to ensure stability. Specific requirements were set for dam body construction in transition areas, focusing on maintaining stability and integrity.

The dam was then constructed in stages. Owing to delays and advancements in dredging technology, which offered increased capacities at relatively lower costs, it was later decided to execute the Tholense Gat closure also with sand. This approach necessitated creating an extended tidal curve for several days, by partially closing the Oosterscheldekering. An assessment of the environmental impact of this method deemed it acceptable.

The dredging vessels used on the project included the Aquarius, the Sliedrecht 27, the Zuiderklip, and the Mercurius. The production data of some of the dredgers, showing the increase in output from the originally planned sand closure volumes, is presented in the table below:

Dredger	Planned Output (m³/h)	Achieved Output (m³/h)
Aquarius	4800	6500
Sliedrecht 27	4200	5300
Zuiderklip	3000	4400

In 1986, the dam's closure was executed using sand as the primary material. The construction of the road (N659) across the dam was completed in 1989. This new route was inaugurated by the Commissioner of the King, Kees Boertien, marking its official opening to the public.

The Bergse Diepsluis, situated at the northern extremity of the dam, stands on the historical site of the submerged city of Reimerswaal. The city was destroyed by repeated floods, and the last citizens left in 1632. Recognising the historical significance of the area, an information centre was established at the Bergse Diepsluis in July 2022. This centre serves as a memorial and educational point, detailing the history of approximately 250 villages in Zeeland that were submerged in Reimerswaal (in the period 1550-1650) and elsewhere in the province.

== Gallery ==
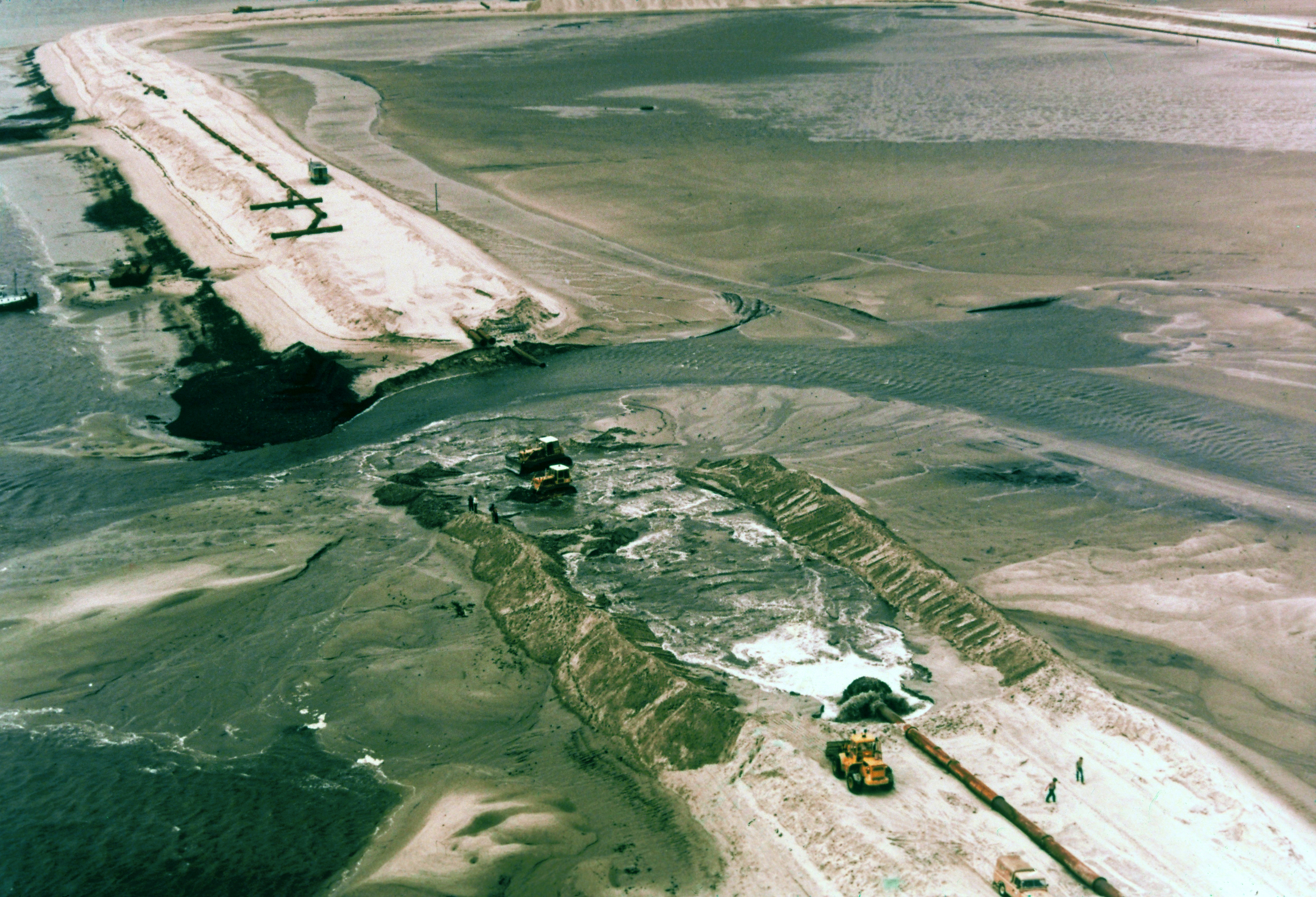
Aerial view of the sand closure of the Oesterdam (1983)

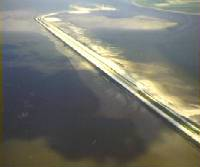
The Markiezaat Lake, Oesterdam, and Eastern Scheldt

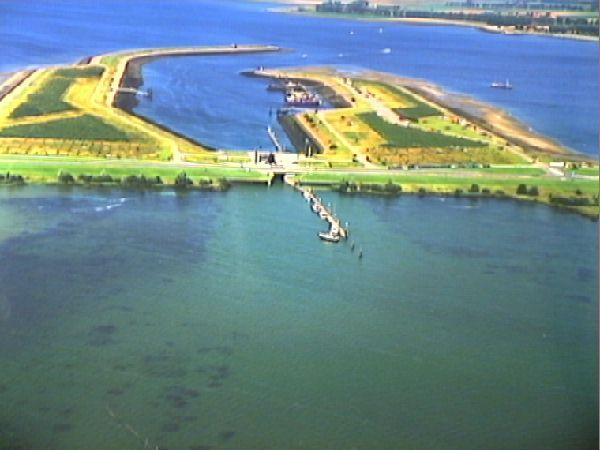
The Oesterdam with the Bergsediepsluis

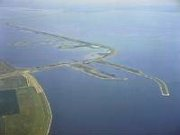
The Oesterdam with the Bergsediepsluis

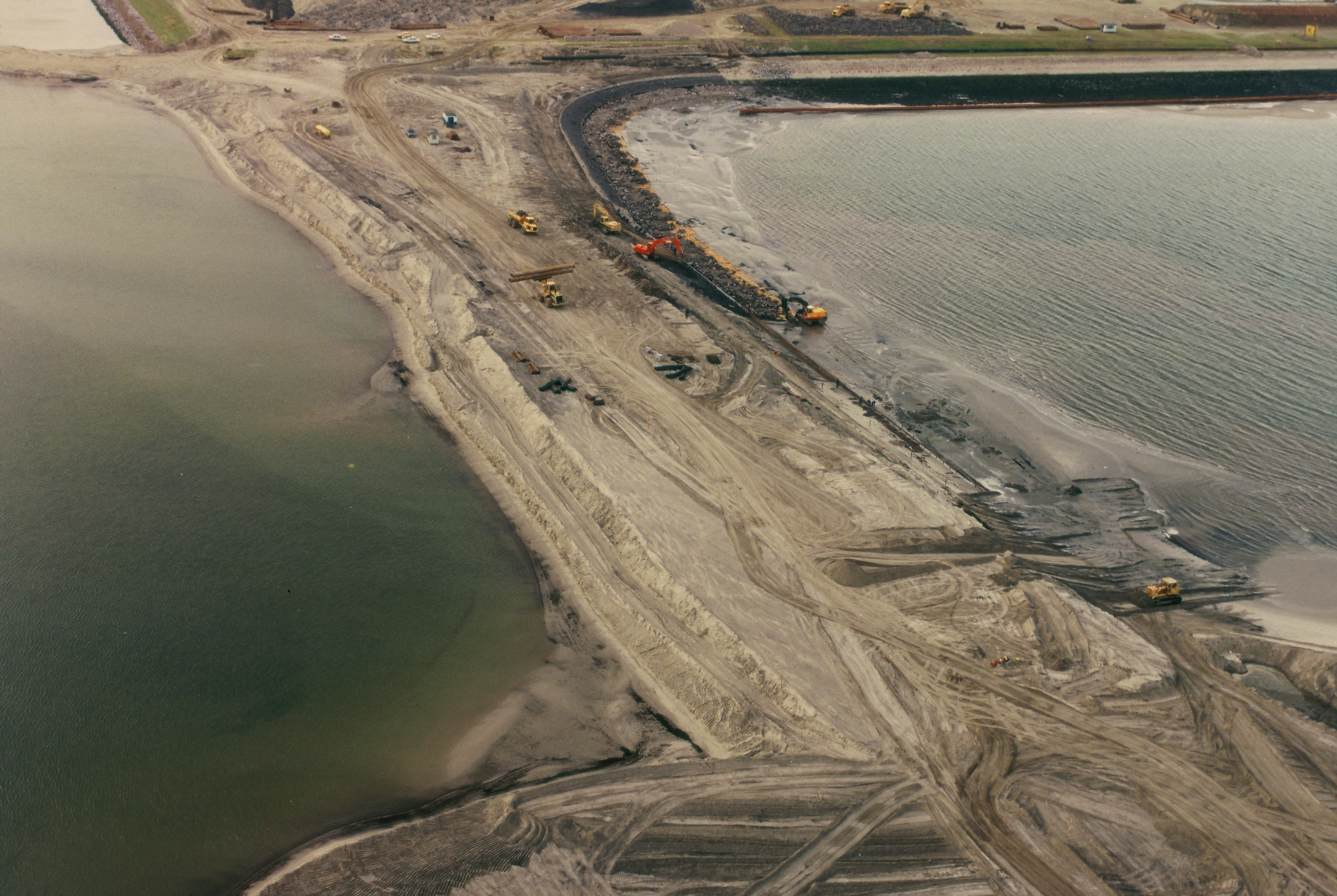
Sand closure of the Tholense Gap

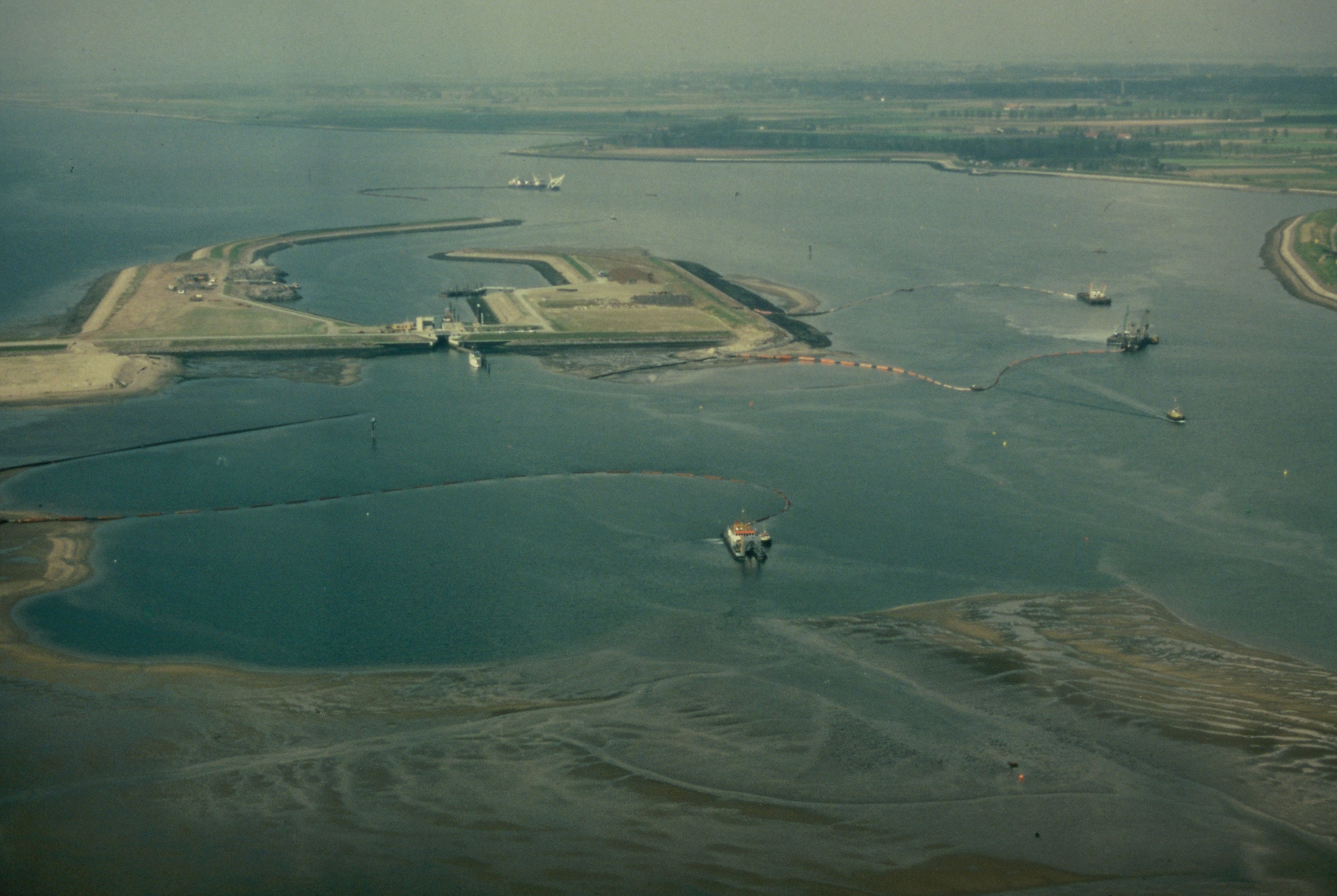
Aerial photo of the closure gap

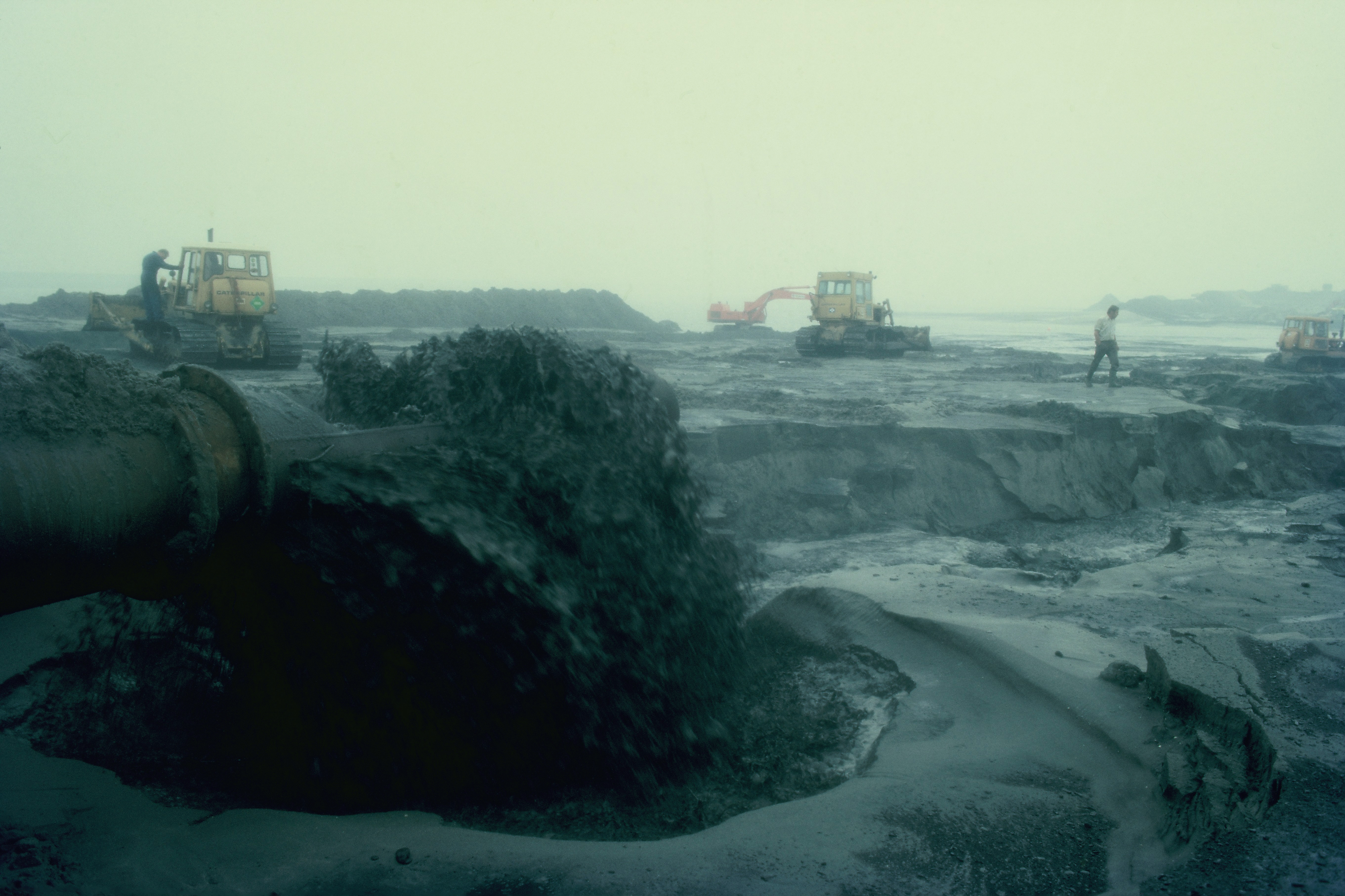
Sand closure works at the Molenplaat section of the Oesterdam (1983)

== See also ==
- Delta Works
- Flood control in the Netherlands
- Rijkswaterstaat
