= Scheldt–Rhine Canal =

Canal connecting Belgium and Netherlands

Scheldt-Rhine Canal
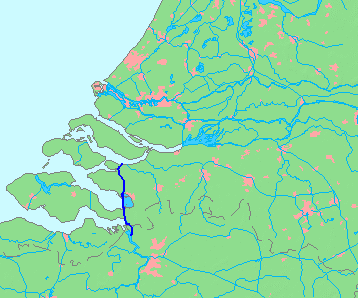
- The Scheldt-Rhine canal
- Interactive map of Scheldt-Rhine Canal
- Country: The Netherlands

Specifications
- Length: 32 kilometres (19.9 miles; 17.3 nautical miles)
- Lock length: 320 m (1,050 ft)
- Lock width: 24 m (79 ft)
- Maximum boat length: 225 m (738 ft)
- Maximum boat beam: 23.5 m (77.1 ft)
- Maximum boat draft: 4.3 m (14.1 ft)
- Maximum boat air draft: 9.1 m (30 ft) (due to fixed bridges)
- Original number of locks: 2 parallel
- Status: operational

History
- Construction began: 1963
- Date completed: 1975

Geography
- Start point: Port of Antwerp, Belgium
- End point: Volkerak at Rhine-Meuse Delta, Netherlands
- Beginning coordinates: 51°21′0.72″N 4°18′2.88″E
- Ending coordinates: 51°38′3.84″N 4°14′16.44″E

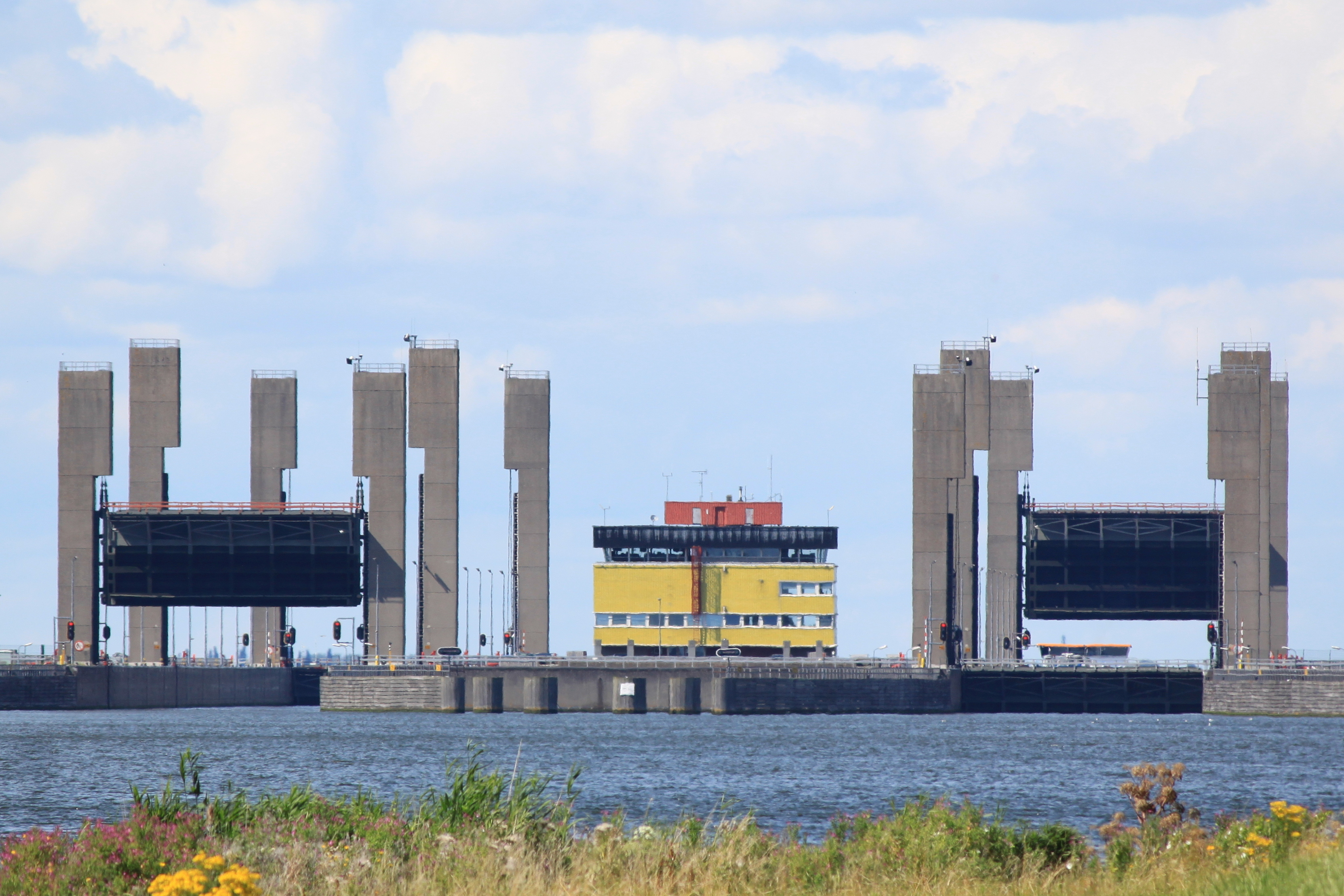
Kreekrak sluices 2012-07-21

The Scheldt–Rhine Canal (Schelde-Rijnkanaal) in Belgium and the Netherlands connects Antwerp with the Volkerak, and thereby the Scheldt with the Rhine.

== Route ==
The canal starts close to the Scheldt river, at the port of Antwerp, and generally runs north. After it passes the Dutch-Belgian border, it serves as the border between the Dutch provinces of North Brabant and Zeeland. Just north of Zuid-Beveland ships have to pass the Kreekrak sluices to enter the lower part of the canal. Just north of the sluices the canal enters the artificial Zoommeer and leaves this lake again as a canalised section of the former Eendracht strait, before terminating in the Volkerak estuary. Here, the Volkerak sluices provide access to the Rhine-Meuse Delta and the port of Rotterdam.

== History ==
During the 1920s the Belgian government demanded a replacement for the Canal through Zuid-Beveland, to keep the port of Antwerp accessible for the lucrative Rhine trade. According to the original plan, the new canal was supposed to connect Antwerp directly to Moerdijk on the Hollands Diep, but after the Second World War and the North Sea flood of 1953 the Dutch government decided that the new canal should be part of the Delta Works and proposed a more westerly route, in fact it would take the same route as the ancient Striene river. After the Belgian government agreed in 1963, work on the canal began.

In order to keep the canal free of tides, two dams were built to separate the tidal Oosterschelde from the Scheldt-Rhine canal. These are the Oesterdam (resulting in the creation of the Zoommeer) and the Philipsdam (that turned the Volkerak estuary into a freshwater lake).

== Bridges ==
It crosses the east of Zuid-Beveland, where it is crossed by a railroad bridge (between the stations Rilland-Bath on the west and Bergen op Zoom on the east) and three road bridges, and along Tholen, where it is spanned by three road bridges.
