= Volkerak =

Coordinates: 51.65°N 4.3°E

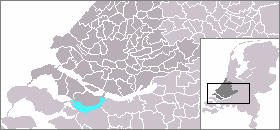
Volkerak highlighted in cyan.

The Volkerak is a body of water in the Netherlands. It is part of the Rhine–Meuse–Scheldt delta, and is situated between the island Goeree-Overflakkee to the north-west and the Dutch mainland to the south and east. The western part of the Volkerak is also called Krammer. Tributaries of the Volkerak are the Dintel and Steenbergse Vliet.

Before 1987, it was a tidal river open to the North Sea, but it was closed off as part of the Delta Works; it is now a fresh water lake.

== Delta Works ==
The Volkerak is navigable by sea-going ships. On the eastern end are the Volkerak Locks (Volkeraksluizen) connecting it to the Hollands Diep. At the western end is the Philipsdam and Krammer Locks (Krammersluizen) connecting it to the Eastern Scheldt (Oosterschelde), and also the Grevelingendam and Grevelingen Lock (Grevelingensluis) connecting it to the Grevelingen Grevelingen. Finally, the Scheldt–Rhine Canal connects it to the port of Antwerp and thus the North Sea, providing access for ocean-going vessels.

== Future ==
Due to the low supply of fresh water to the now-enclosed Volkerak, and runoff of agricultural nutrients, the lake suffers from algal bloom throughout the summer, and swimming is prohibited. The decision to transform it again into a salt water lake could be taken between 2015 and 2020.

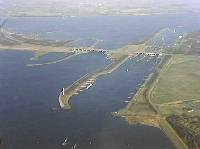
Volkerak Locks

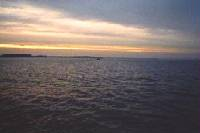
View of Volkerak
