= Striene =

De Striene was a water channel that ran between the Schelde near Tholen and the Maas rivers in Zeeland in the Netherlands. In the St. Elizabeth's Flood of 1421 the watercourses in the Maas and Rhine delta were drastically changed, and the Striene disappeared. However, the current Scheldt-Rhine Canal mostly follows the ancient path of the Striene.

The place names Strijen, Cromstrijen, and Strijenham on Tholen are probably derived from Striene. The name Strienestad used for Steenbergen in North Brabant during the Carnival, also refers to the Striene.
