= Eastern Scheldt =

Estuary in Zeeland, Netherlands

Coordinates: 51°33′14″N 3°57′57″E

Designations

Ramsar Wetland
- Official name: Oosterschelde
- Designated: 4 March 1987
- Reference no.: 354

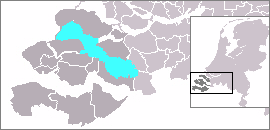
Eastern Scheldt (Oosterschelde)

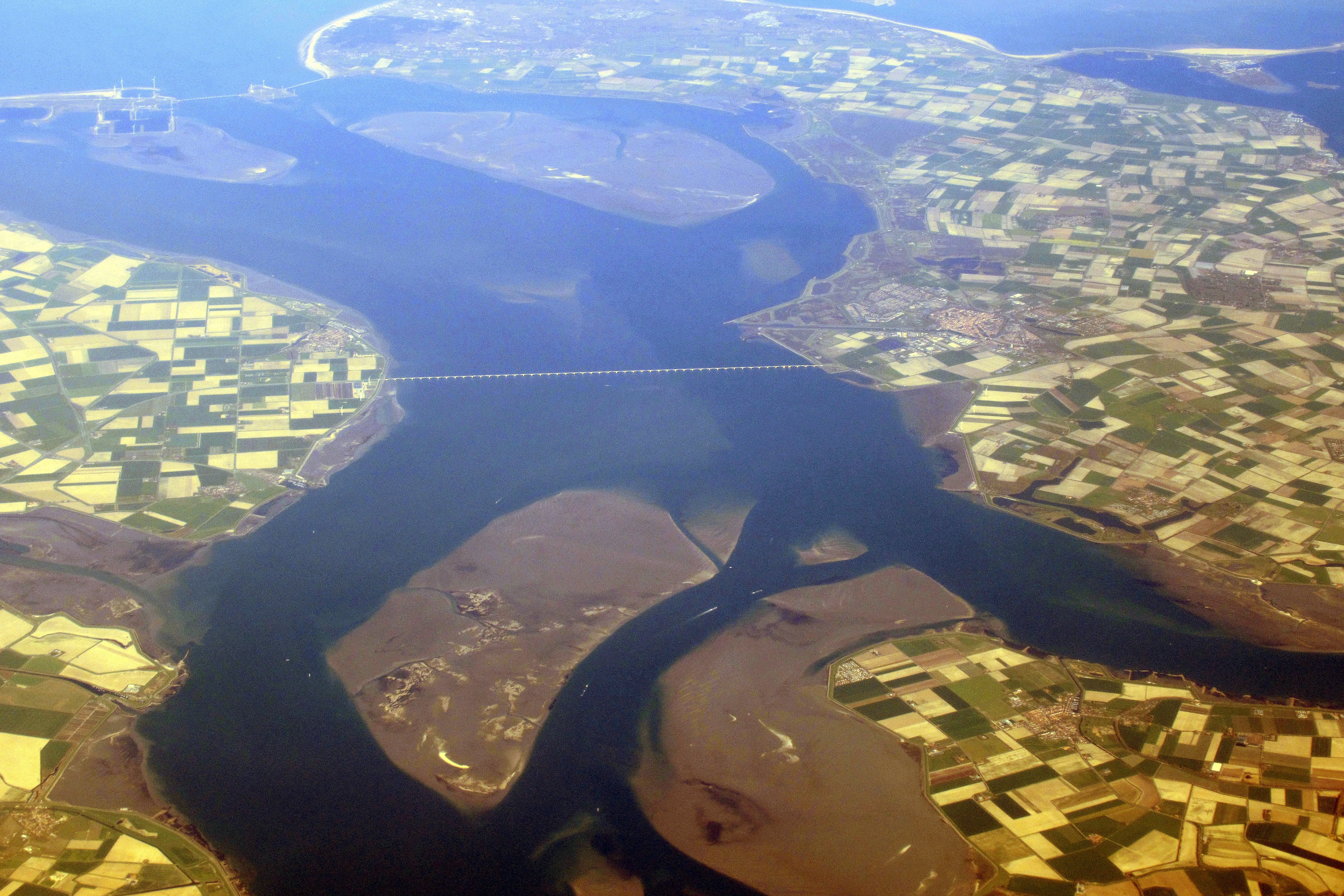
Aerial view

The Eastern Scheldt (Dutch: Oosterschelde) is a former estuary in the province of Zeeland, Netherlands, between Schouwen-Duiveland and Tholen on the north and Noord-Beveland and Zuid-Beveland on the south. It also features the largest national park in the Netherlands, founded in 2002.

== History ==
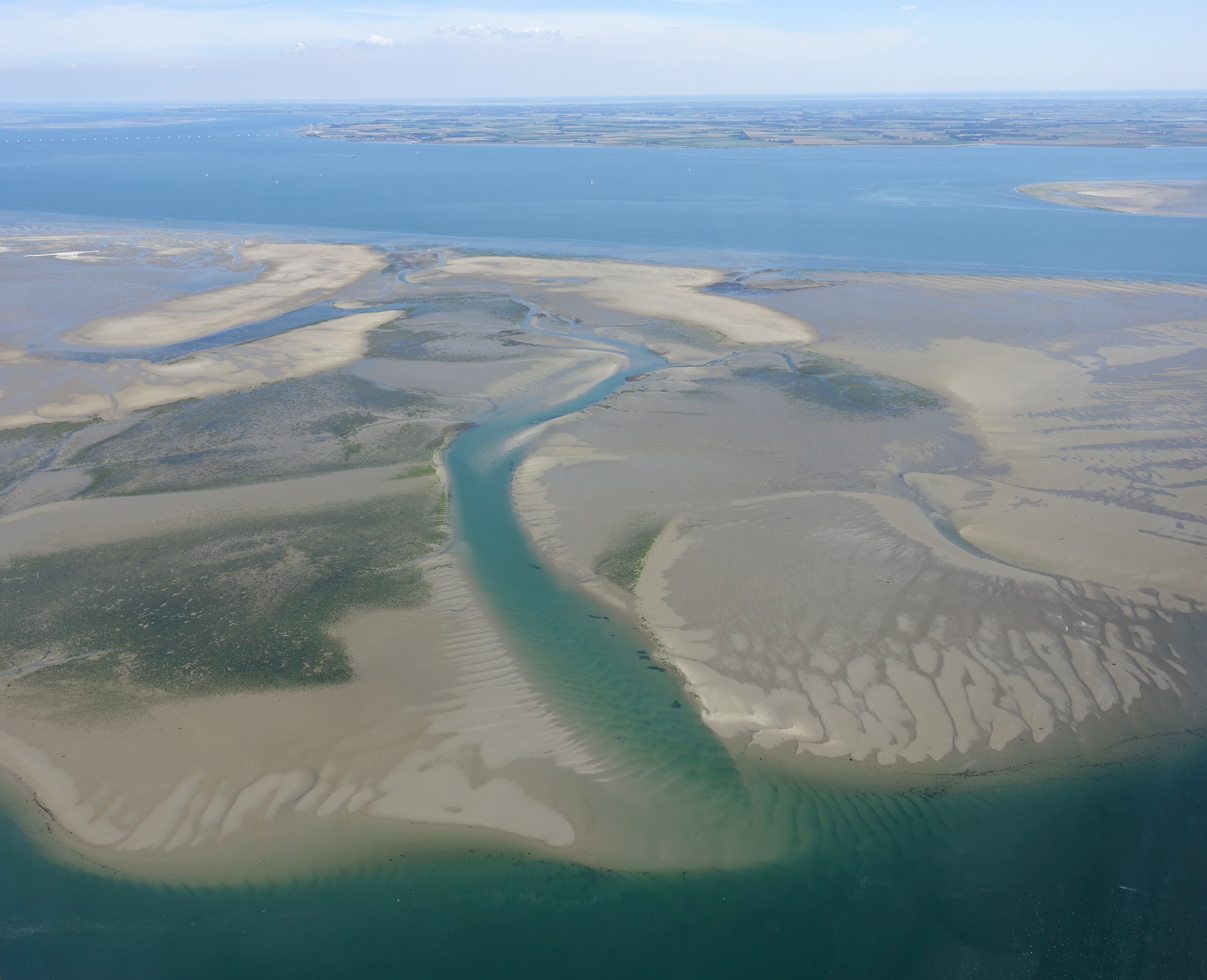
Aerial view of Roggenplaat shoal

During the Roman Era it was the major mouth of the Scheldt River. Before the St. Felix's Flood of 1530, it flowed north as a river from the east end of the Westerschelde, turned west a little west of Bergen op Zoom, and then west along the north edge of what is now the Verdronken Land van Reimerswaal, and after that widened into an estuary. Parts of that lost land were later reclaimed, restricting part of the connection to the Scheldt River to a narrow channel called the Kreekrak, which silted up and became unnavigable. In 1867 the Kreekrak was closed off with a railway embankment, connecting in the process the island of Zuid-Beveland to the mainland of North Brabant. From that moment on, the Oosterschelde lost its connection with the Scheldt, and is no longer functioning as an estuary.

== Navigation and connections ==
The Oosterschelde offers a connection to the North Sea to the west via the Roompotsluis at Neeltje Jans, the Grevelingen and Krammer to the northeast via the Grevelingensluis and Krammersluizen at the Grevelingendam and Philipsdam, the Scheldt–Rhine Canal to the east via the Bergsediepsluis at the Oesterdam, the Western Scheldt to the south via the Canal through Zuid-Beveland, and the Veerse Meer to the southwest via the Zandkreeksluis at the Zandkreekdam.

Between Schouwen-Duiveland and Noord-Beveland there are two road connections, the Oosterscheldedam on the west and the Zeeland Bridge on the east.

== Storm surge barrier and dam ==
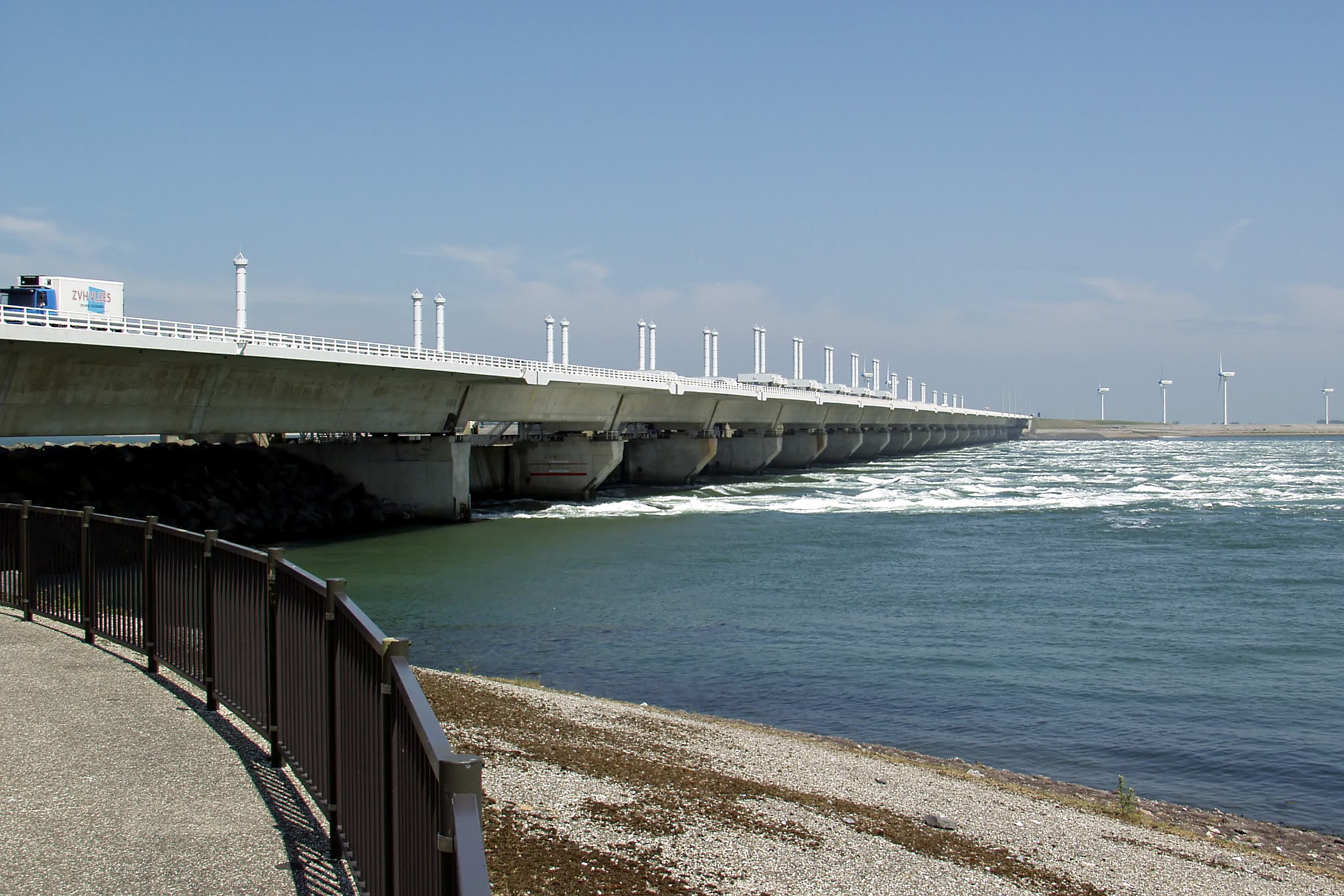
The Oosterscheldekering

After the North Sea flood of 1953, it was decided to close off the Oosterschelde by means of a dam and a storm surge barrier. The Oosterscheldekering (Eastern Scheldt Storm Surge Barrier), between Schouwen-Duiveland and Noord-Beveland, is the largest of 13 ambitious Delta Works designed to protect a large part of the Netherlands from flooding. A four-kilometre section has huge sluice gates, which are normally open but can be closed in adverse weather.

Upon completion of the Oosterscheldekering and Oesterdam in 1986, the ebb and flow of water decreased and thus the tidal height differential was reduced from 3.40 metres (11.2 ft) to 3.25 metres (10.7 ft). As a result, the shoals are no longer being naturally replenished with sand, further disrupting the ecosystem of the estuary; the shoals are used for, among other things, food for birds and resting places for seals. To help compensate for the partial loss of the tide resulting in the sand being less stirred up and ending up on the banks, Rijkswaterstaat applied large amounts of sand to the Roggeplaat shoal in the northwestern part of the estuary in 2019 and 2020.

== Oosterschelde National Park ==
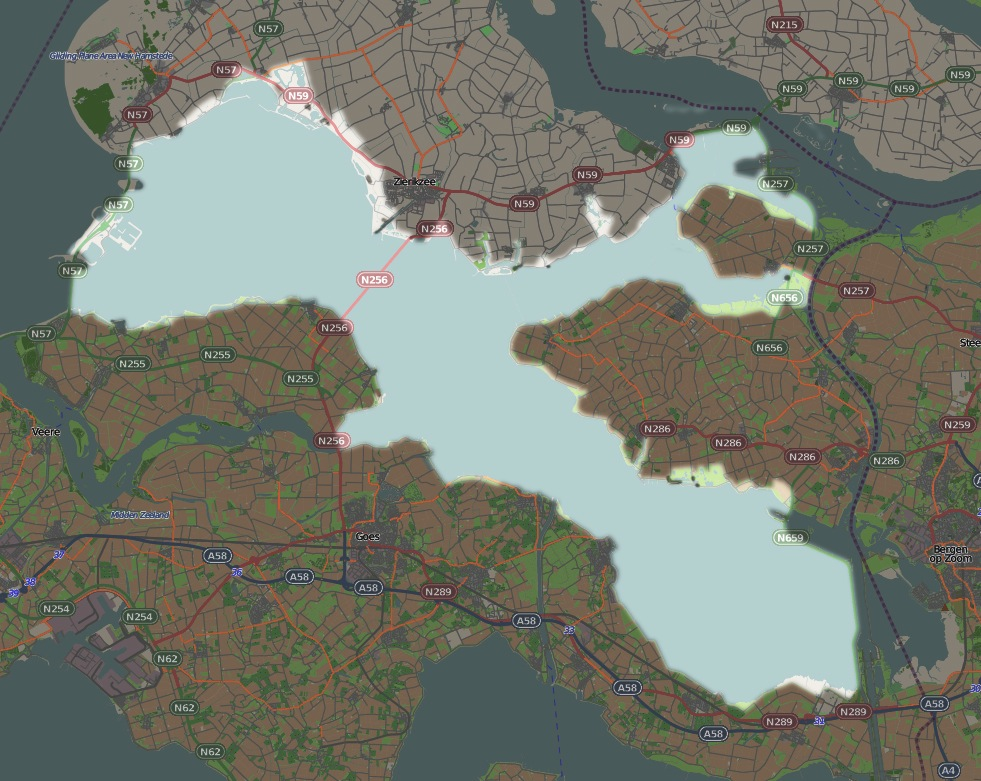
The Oosterschelde National Park

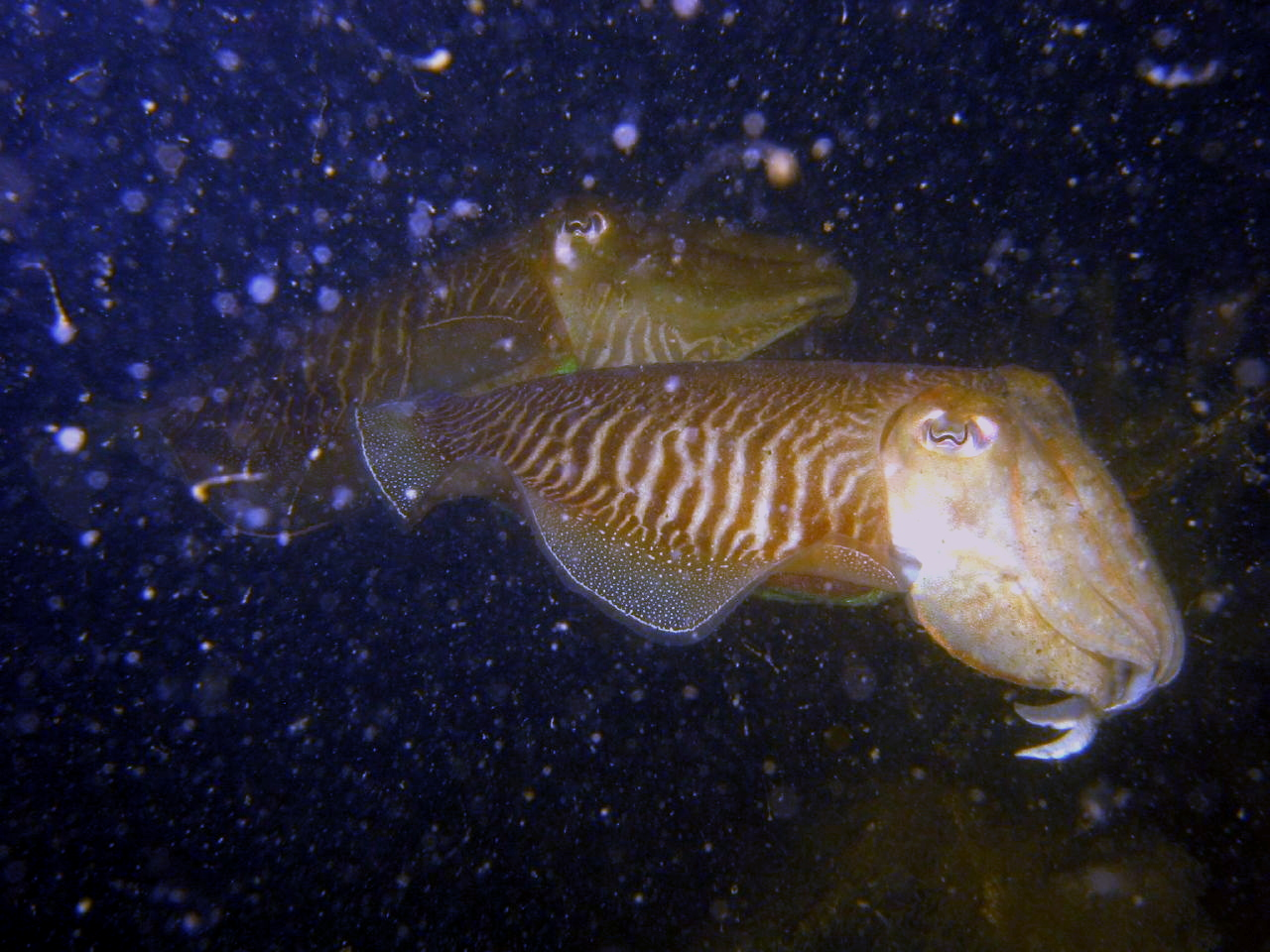
Sepia officinalis

Since May 8, 2002, the entire Oosterschelde has been designated as a national park. Its boundaries are the dikes of Schouwen-Duiveland, Tholen, Sint Philipsland, Noord-Beveland, Zuid-Beveland, and the dams of the Delta Works. Having an area of 370 square kilometres (140 sq mi), it is the largest national park in the Netherlands. Total shore length is 125 kilometres (78 mi).

The park consists primarily of the salt waters of the Oosterschelde, but also includes some mud flats, meadows and shoals. Because of the large variety of sea life, including unique regional species, the park is popular with scuba divers. Other activities include sailing, fishing, cycling and bird watching.

== See also ==
- Delta Works
- Western Scheldt
