= Krammer =

Coordinates: 51.66°N 4.18°E

The Krammer is a body of fresh water located in the western part of Volkerak in the Netherlands.

It is part of the Rhine–Meuse–Scheldt delta, and is situated between the islands Goeree-Overflakkee and Sint Philipsland. To the west, it continues into the Grevelingen, from which it is separated by the Grevelingendam.

Before 1967, it was a tidal river, but it was closed off as part of the Delta Works.

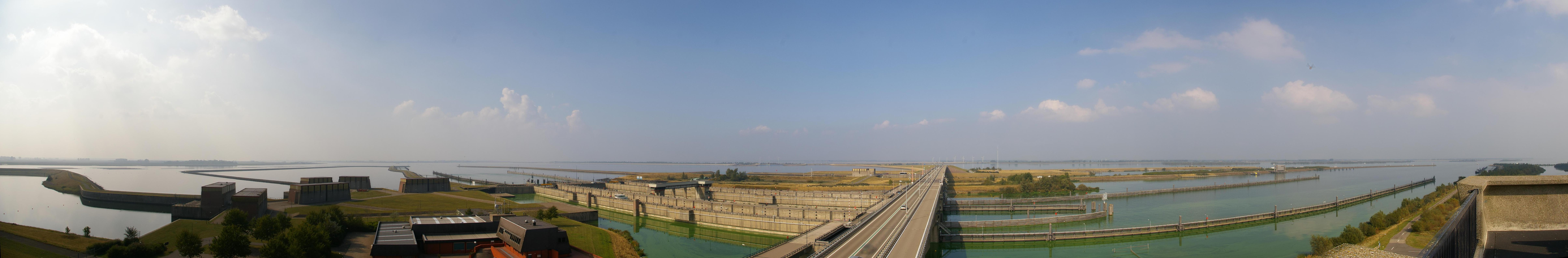
Looking north at the Philips Dam Locks and the Krammer.
