= Grevelingen =

Brackish water body in the Netherlands partly isolated from the North Sea by a levee

Grevelingen Grevelingenmeer
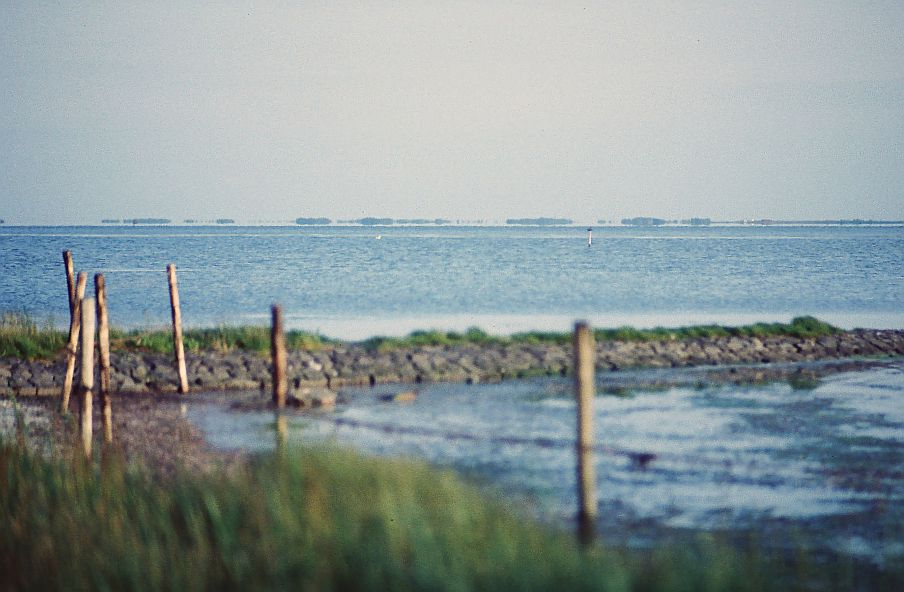
- View of the Grevelingenmeer

- Location within South Holland
- Coordinates: 51°42′51″N 4°01′20″E
- Basin countries: Netherlands

Ramsar Wetland
- Designated: 29 August 2000
- Reference no.: 1272

The Grevelingen or Grevelingenmeer (Lake Grevelingen) is a closed off part of the Rhine-Meuse estuary on the border of the Dutch provinces of South Holland and Zeeland.

It is situated between the islands of Goeree-Overflakkee (South Holland) and Schouwen-Duiveland (Zeeland) and was closed off as part of the Delta Works, a huge engineering project designed to protect the southwestern part of the Netherlands from flooding. The Brouwersdam, a dike connecting the two islands on the west, closes off the Grevelingen from the North Sea. The Grevelingendam, the dike on the east, blocks the inflow of the Rhine and Meuse water.

Since its closure in 1971, the saltwater of the Grevelingen slowly started to become brackish due to rainwater and excess polderwater from the islands, but the Dutch changed their mind and decided that they wanted to preserve the saline biotope. Therefore, in 1978 a sluice was created under the Brouwersdam, partially restoring and maintaining the saline character of the Grevelingen.

Nevertheless, the water body life remains affected by the changes in water salinity, in the transport of sediments, and by a deficit in oxygen in deep water, caused by the levee since 1971. Benthic life (mussels, oysters and many fixed organisms) is rich in the shallow waters in the photic zone, but the deep sediments are less conducive to marine life, and fishes in open water are rarely observed during diving.

The Brouwerssluis is open all year round except during storm floods. Brouwerssluis is the home of a seal colony subsisting on fish transported by the seawater stream entering the water body during high tide.

Connexxion bus service 104 crosses the Brouwersdam, bus service 133 (and others) the Grevelingendam.

The Grevelingenmeer is the largest saltwater water body in Europe and a popular place for holidays and water sports (sailing, surfing, diving).

== Trivia ==
Professional freestyle windsurfer Steven Van Broeckhoven refers to the Grevelingenmeer as his homespot.
