= Floodplain restoration =

Restoration of a river's floodplain

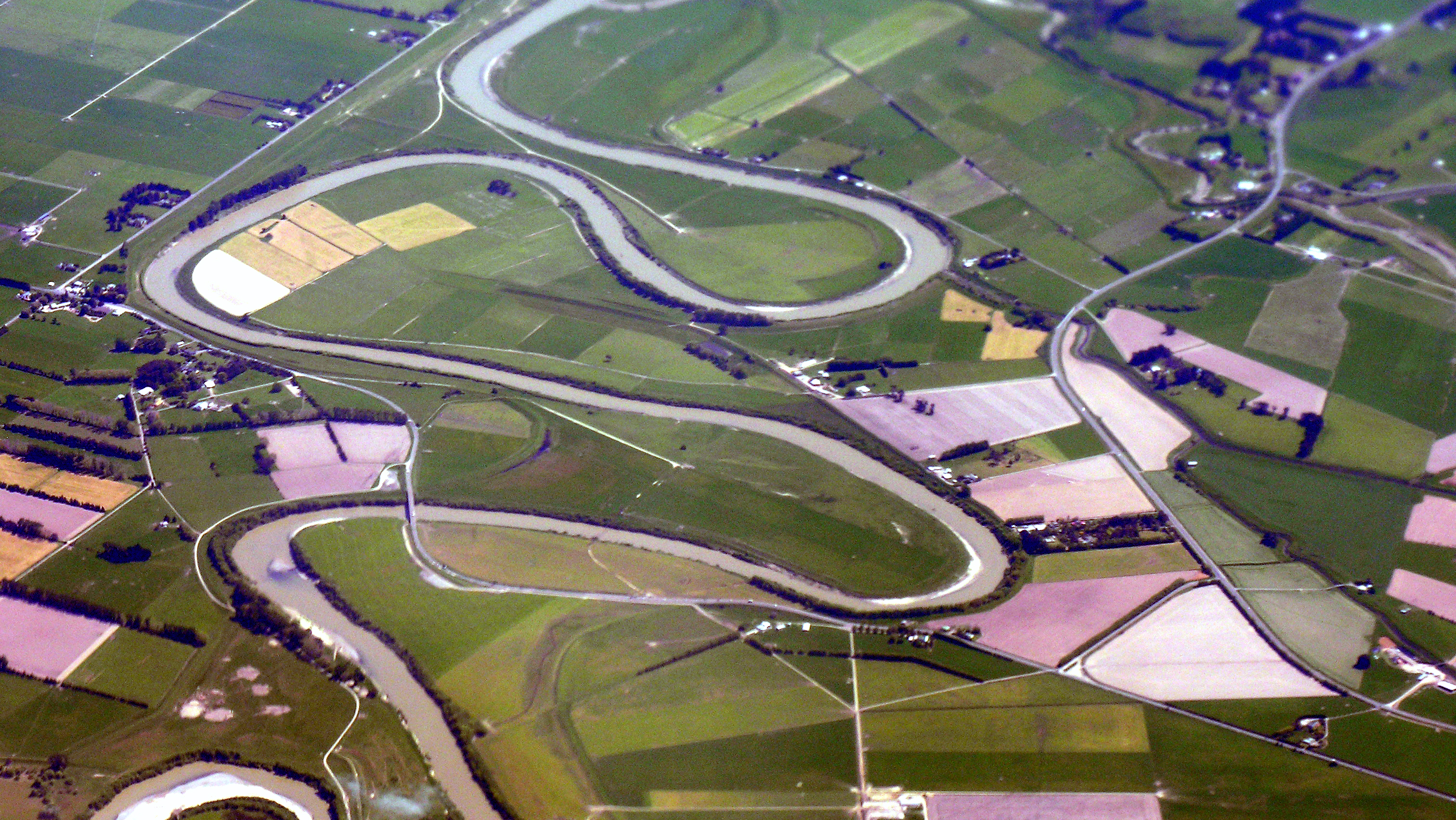
Land use of the Manawatu River Floodplain in New Zealand

Floodplain restoration is the process of fully or partially restoring a river's floodplain to its original conditions before having been affected by the construction of levees (dikes) and the draining of wetlands and marshes.

The objectives of restoring floodplains include the reduction of the incidence of floods, the provision of habitats for aquatic species, the improvement of water quality and the increased recharge of groundwater.

== Description ==
=== Types/methods ===
Anthropogenic impacts on floodplain mostly target the lateral connectivity between rivers and their floodplains, so many restoration methods focus on removing human-made structures that disrupt connectivity. One type of floodplain restoration are levee setbacks and dam removal, either full or partial, to allow for rivers to migrate within a space that is closer to the natural floodplain. Another method is through a "beaded approach" with allows small portions of a floodplain to be restored to natural habitat and functions . The removal of levees and/or weirs can allow for the reconnection of river channels to their floodplain. Riverside embankments through the creation of overflow sills and creating artificial opening at inflow channels can help increase channel connectivity to the floodplain. Restoring drained or degraded wetlands can help increase floodplain connectivity.

==== Floodplain and wetland restoration as Nature-Based Solutions ====
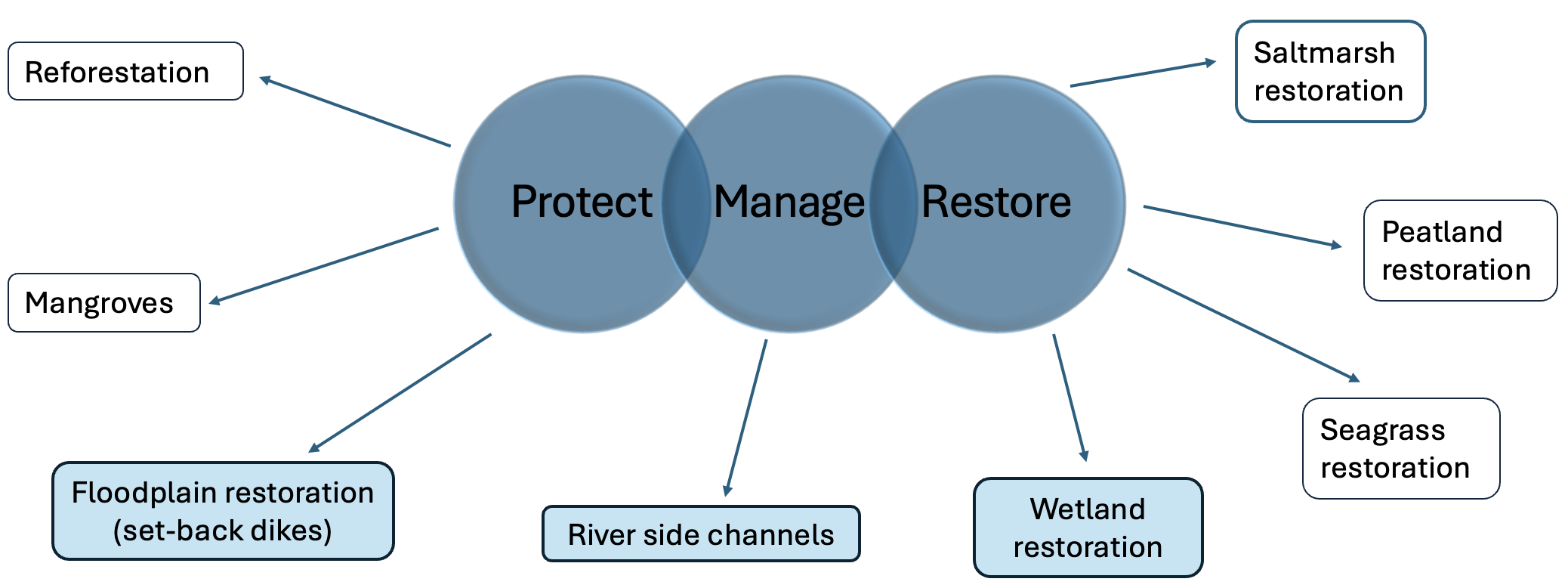
Different types of floodplain nature-based solutions.

Floodplain and wetland restoration are nature-based solutions (NbS) that reduce flood risk by increasing the natural ecosystem's service to attenuate water. Restoring vegetative biodiversity promotes soil water attenuation that can reduce peak flow. In addition, vegetation stabilizes soils, traps sediments, and promotes vertical accretion, increasing surface elevation and long-term resilience to flooding and sea-level rise. NbS can be applied to estuarine, lacustrine, and riverine floodplains, as well as peatlands.

Increased flora biodiversity provides surface roughness that can reduce wave energy by approximately 70% in salt marshes and 65% in mangrove fields during floods. Planting mangroves is a common NbS as they can reduce storm surge heights by approximately 40–50 cm per km of forest width.

The effectiveness of floodplain NbS is highly site-specific and depends on vegetation density, hydrology, sediment supply, and flood magnitude. They are most effective for frequent, low- to moderate- intensity floods, and have limited benefit for extreme flooding events when applied autonomously.

===== Coastal floodplain protection and restoration =====
NbS are relevant for coastal wetlands because they are significant sinks of blue carbon, storing approximately 30% of all Earth's soil organic carbon. Mangroves, salt marshes, and seagrasses have a Technical Mitigation Potential of 0.3 (0.04–0.84) GtCO₂-eq yr⁻¹and economically feasible potential of (≤ USD 100/tCO₂) ~0.1 (0.05–0.2) GtCO₂-eq yr⁻¹, according to the IPCC Sixth Assessment Report 2022. While there is high confidence in coastal wetland's capacity to act as large carbon sinks, the improvement of their carbon sequestration rates through restoration is debated, and the long-term permanence under climate change is uncertain.

===== Inland floodplain protection and restoration =====
NbS are also used to rewet peatlands to reduce soil oxidation and improve ecosystem functioning. Some studies have estimated peatlands to have a Technical Mitigation Potential to store ~0.8 (0.5–1.3) GtCO₂-eq yr⁻¹ and have an economic potential of (≤ USD 100/tCO₂) ~0.4 (0.2–0.6) GtCO₂-eq yr⁻¹ on average.

While NbS can improve floodplain ecosystem functioning to store large amounts of carbon dioxide, the magnitude of their sink capacity is variable and difficult to determine; however, their primary role in flood risk reduction and adaptation is well supported with medium to high confidence in literature.

=== Potential benefits ===
Floodplain restoration can restore previously lost or degraded ecosystem services. These ecosystem services can be categorized by supporting, regulating, provisioning, and cultural services. Restoring floodplains can help regulate flood events and mitigate flood related damage. Floodplain restoration can also increase biodiversity by creating new or restoring degraded habitat and encourage growth of native species. Methods of wetland restoration in the floodplain, can help better water quality. Reconnecting rivers to their floodplains promotes carbon storage in soil and regulates processes within soil.

=== Challenges ===
There are several issues that may arise when planning and/or implementing floodplain restoration projects. Since floodplain restoration involves a wide range of partnerships and stakeholders, a lack of communication between parties and differences ideas or priorities for restoration goals can be a constraint for restoration projects. There is also the potential for a higher value or desire placed into immediate flood-defense and current land-use practices rather than the ecological or environmental benefits, which can stall or prevent floodplain restoration. It is also important to include the socio-economic aspects of floodplain restoration, so when this becomes a constraint to projects that do not consider these aspects. Restoration efforts need to be properly and continuously monitored to determine effectiveness and benefits.

== Examples of existing projects ==
=== Africa ===
- Waza-Logone Restoration

=== Asia and The Pacific ===
- Tarim River, China case study focuses on the cultural, socio-economic, and environmental aspects of the basin to plan for restoration projects.
- Mekong Delta, Vietnam restoration to aid with coastal protection.
- Four Major Rivers Restoration Project in South Korea to restore the Han, Nakdong, Geum, and Yeongsan rivers.

=== Europe ===
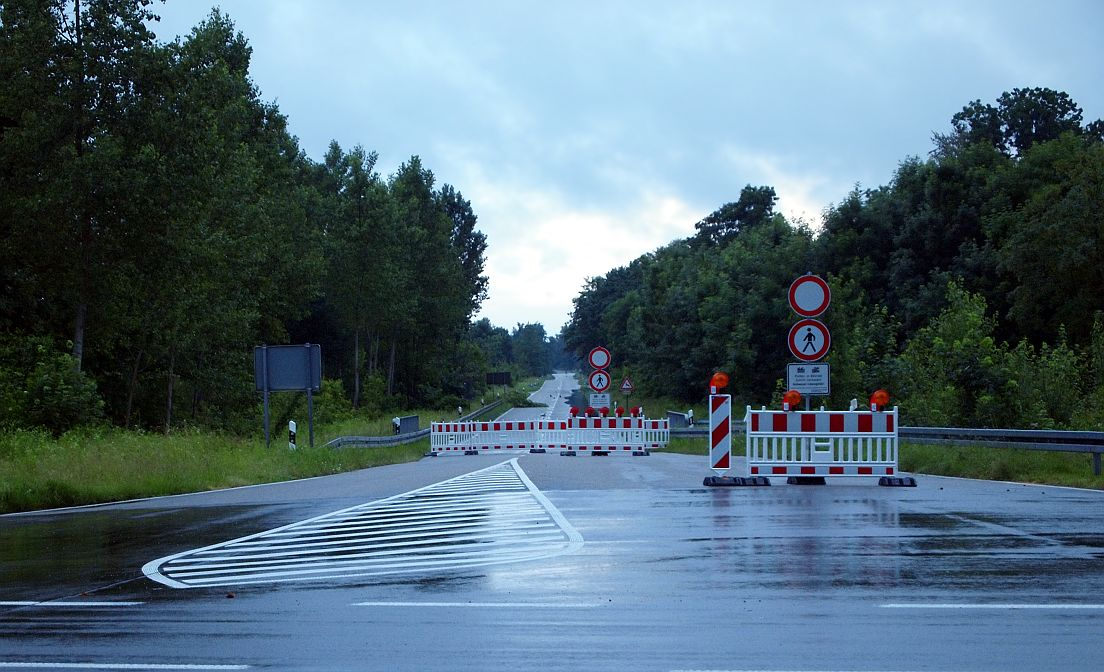
Road flooded intentionally in a polder on the Upper Rhine

One of the drivers for floodplain restoration is the EU Water Framework Directive. Early floodplain restoration schemes were undertaken in the mid-1990s in the Rheinvorland-Süd on the Upper Rhine, the Bourret on the Garonne, and as part of the Long Eau project in England. Ongoing schemes in 2007 include Lenzen on the Elbe, La Basse on the Seine and the Parrett Catchment Project in England. On the Elbe River near Lenzen (Brandenburg), 420 hectares of floodplain were restored in order to prevent a recurrence of the Elbe floods of 2002. A total of 20 floodplain restoration projects on the Elbe River were envisaged after the 2002 floods, but only two have been implemented as of 2009 according to the environmental group de:BUND. An additional example is the Upper Danube River, Germany Restoration project.

==== Lower Danube Green Corridor Agreement ====
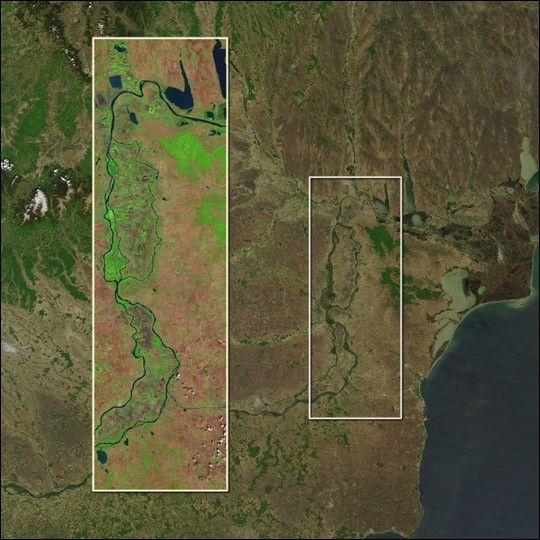
Satellite image of the Lower Danube Green Corridor (2003)

The Lower Danube has experienced large-scale degradation within the last century due to dike construction projects on approximately 75% of its natural floodplain. The loss of ecosystem functioning has lowered the water table and put the region at risk of extreme flood events, likely to be exacerbated by climate change. Anthropogenic activity such as gravel extraction, dredging and dam construction has eroded the riverbed and caused eutrophication.

The Lower Danube Green Corridor Agreement is a collaborative restoration project initiated in 2000 between Bulgaria, Romania, Ukraine, and Moldova to create a green corridor along the entire 1,000+ km stretch of the lower Danube river with the objective to reduce the risk of extreme flood events in rural and urbanized areas. The collaboration aims to restore natural floodplains through different methods (dike deconstruction and removal of invasive species), instigate federal protection for wetlands, and promote natural resource economics, particularly through fisheries and tourism. Additionally, the project is expected to increase climate change resilience of both the river and urban areas.

Floodplain restoration offers co-benefits through water attenuation, purification, ecosystem productivity, and recreation. These co-benefits also extend to drought management and the avoidance of GDP loss through floods damages.

==== Waal River Project (Netherlands) ====
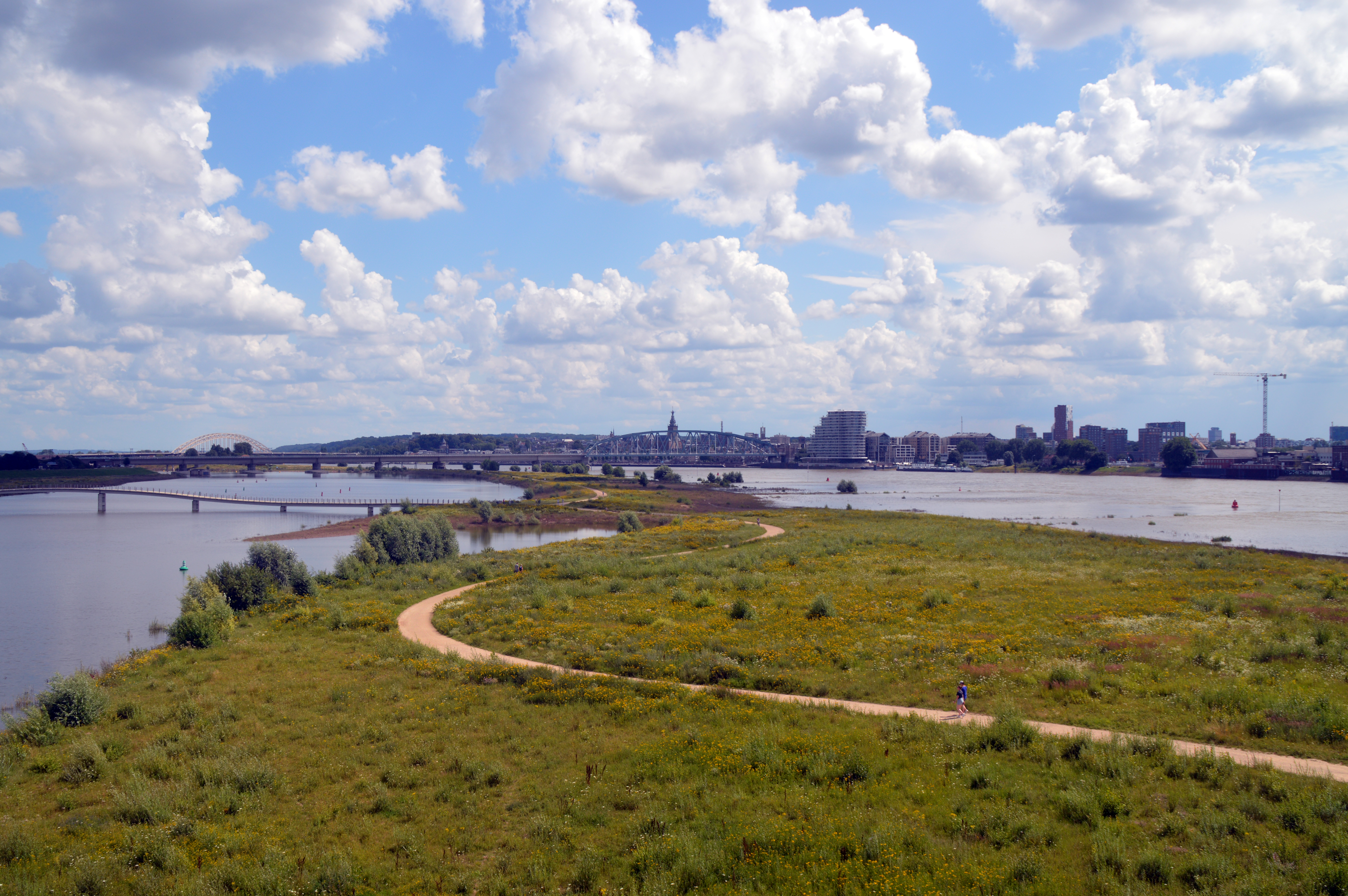
New urban river island after dike relocation in Nijmegen (2021)

The Waal river project in Nijmegen is a flagship intervention within the Dutch Room for the River program, developed after the near-disaster floods of 1993 and 1995 revealed the limits of continually raising dikes. At a major bottleneck near Nijmegen, the river lacked space to safely convey extreme discharges. Instead of further hard engineering, the project restored floodplain capacity by relocating the Lent dike 350 metres inland and creating a 3-km-long side channel. This widened the extent of the river width in winter, lowered peak water levels by approximately 35 cm, and significantly reduced flood risk for both Nijmegen and Lent. At the same time, the intervention enhanced spatial quality by creating a new urban river island that combines flood safety with nature development and recreation. As part of the Room for the River project, the Waal project exemplifies a policy shift toward working with natural river dynamics. This approach aligns with IPCC recommendations on climate-resilient flood risk management and EU frameworks such as the Water Framework Directive and Floods Directive, which promote floodplain restoration, risk reduction, and multifunctional land use.

=== Latin America and the Caribbean ===
- Chubut River Restoration Project

=== North America ===
Floodplain restoration in the United States is driven by The Clean Water Act (1972), The Endangered Species Act (1973), and various state level legislations.

- In the catchment area of the Chesapeake Bay in Maryland
- Emiquon Preserve on the Illinois River
- Baraboo River in Wisconsin.
- Upper Sandy Creek a tributary in the Cape Fear River in North Carolina.
- Efforts on the Oldman River and St Mary River, in Alberta to restore the flow regime to encourage vegetation growth.

== See also ==
- Ecological restoration
- Riparian zone restoration
- Stream restoration
