= Flood control in the Netherlands =

Manmade control of flooding in the Netherlands

Without dikes, the Netherlands would be flooded to this extent.

Flood control is an important issue for the Netherlands, as due to its low elevation, approximately two thirds of its area is vulnerable to flooding, while the country is densely populated. Natural sand dunes and constructed dikes, dams, and floodgates provide defense against storm surges from the sea. River dikes prevent flooding from water flowing into the country by the major rivers Rhine and Meuse, while a complicated system of drainage ditches, canals, and pumping stations (historically: windmills) keep the low-lying parts dry for habitation and agriculture. Water control boards are the independent local government bodies responsible for maintaining this system.

In modern times, flood disasters coupled with technological developments have led to large construction works to reduce the influence of the sea and prevent future floods. These have proved essential over the course of Dutch history, both geographically and militarily, and have greatly impacted the lives of many living in the cities affected, stimulating their economies through constant infrastructural improvement.

== History ==
The Greek geographer Pytheas noted of the Low Countries, as he passed them on his way to Heligoland c. 325 BCE, that "more people died in the struggle against water than in the struggle against men". Roman author Pliny, of the 1st century, wrote something similar in his Natural History:

There, twice in every twenty-four hours, the ocean's vast tide sweeps in a flood over a large stretch of land and hides Nature's everlasting controversy about whether this region belongs to the land or to the sea. There these wretched peoples occupy high ground, or manmade platforms constructed above the level of the highest tide they experience; they live in huts built on the site so chosen and are like sailors in ships when the waters cover the surrounding land, but when the tide has receded they are like shipwrecked victims. Around their huts they catch fish as they try to escape with the ebbing tide. It does not fall to their lot to keep herds and live on milk, like neighboring tribes, nor even to fight with wild animals, since all undergrowth has been pushed far back.

The flood-threatened area of the Netherlands is essentially an alluvial plain, built up from sediment left by thousands of years of flooding by rivers and the sea. About 2,000 years ago most of the Netherlands was covered by extensive peat swamps. The coast consisted of a row of coastal dunes and natural embankments which kept the swamps from draining but also from being washed away by the sea. The only areas suitable for habitation were on the higher grounds in the east and south and on the dunes and natural embankments along the coast and the rivers. In several places the sea had broken through these natural defenses and created extensive floodplains in the north. The first permanent inhabitants of this area were probably attracted by the sea-deposited clay soil which was much more fertile than the peat and sandy soil further inland. To protect themselves against floods they built their homes on artificial dwelling hills called terpen or wierden (known as Warften or Halligen in Germany). Between 500 BC and AD 700 there were probably several periods of habitation and abandonment as the sea level periodically rose and fell. The first dikes were low embankments of only a meter or so in height surrounding fields to protect the crops against occasional flooding. Around the 9th century the sea was on the advance again and many terps had to be raised to keep them safe. Many single terps had by this time grown together as villages. These were now connected by the first dikes.

After about AD 1000 the population grew, which meant there was a greater demand for arable land but also that there was a greater workforce available and dike construction was taken up more seriously. The major contributors in later dike building were the monasteries. As the largest landowners they had the organization, resources and manpower to undertake the large construction. By 1250 most dikes had been connected into a continuous sea defense.

The next step was to move the dikes ever-more seawards. Every cycle of high and low tide left a small layer of sediment. Over the years these layers had built up to such a height that they were rarely flooded. It was then considered safe to build a new dike around this area. The old dike was often kept as a secondary defense, called a sleeper dike.

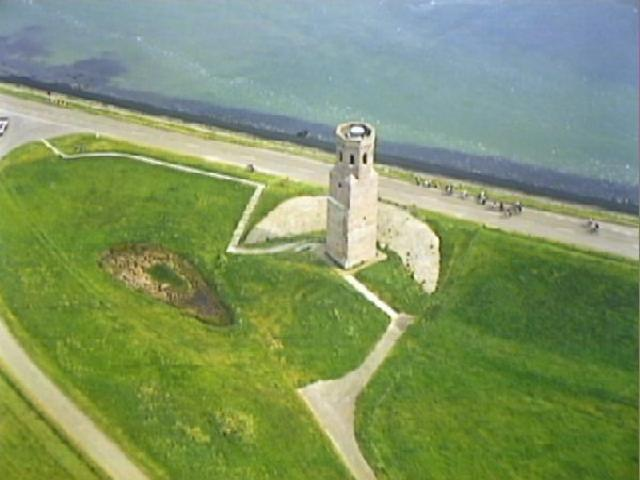
The Plompe toren, the only remainder of the village Koudekerke

A dike could not always be moved seawards. Especially in the southwest river delta it was often the case that the primary sea dike was undermined by a tidal channel. A secondary dike was then built, called an inlaagdijk. With an inland dike, when the seaward dike collapses the secondary inland dike becomes the primary. Although the redundancy provides security, the land from the first to second dike is lost; over the years the loss can become significant.

Taking land from the cycle of flooding by putting a dike around it prevents it from being raised by silt left behind after a flooding. At the same time the drained soil consolidates and peat decomposes leading to land subsidence. In this way the difference between the water level on one side and land level on the other side of the dike grew. While floods became more rare, if the dike did overflow or was breached the destruction was much larger.

The construction method of dikes has changed over the centuries. Popular in the Middle Ages were wierdijken, earth dikes with a protective layer of seaweed. An earth embankment was cut vertically on the sea-facing side. Seaweed was then stacked against this edge, held into place with poles. Compression and rotting processes resulted in a solid residue that proved very effective against wave action and they needed very little maintenance. In places where seaweed was unavailable, other materials, such as reeds or wicker mats, were used.

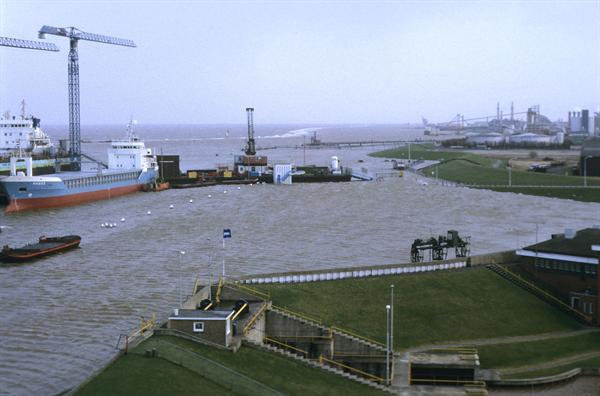
Sea dike keeping Delfzijl and surroundings dry in 1994

Another system used much and for a long time was that of a vertical screen of timbers backed by an earth bank. Technically these vertical constructions were less successful as vibration from crashing waves and washing out of the dike foundations weakened the dike.

Much damage was done to these wood constructions with the arrival of the shipworm (Teredo navalis), a bivalve thought to have been brought to the Netherlands by VOC trading ships, that ate its way through Dutch sea defenses around 1730. The change was made from wood to using stone for reinforcement. This was a great financial setback as there is no naturally occurring rock in the Netherlands and it all had to be imported from abroad.

Current dikes are made with a core of sand, covered by a thick layer of clay to provide waterproofing and resistance against erosion. Dikes without a foreland have a layer of crushed rock below the waterline to slow wave action. Up to the high waterline the dike is often covered with carefully laid basalt stones or a layer of tarmac. The remainder is covered by grass and maintained by grazing sheep. Sheep keep the grass dense and compact the soil, in contrast to cattle.

== Developing the peat swamps ==
At about the same time as the building of dikes the first swamps were made suitable for agriculture by colonists. By digging a system of parallel drainage ditches water was drained from the land to be able to grow grain. However, the peat settled much more than other soil types when drained and land subsidence resulted in developed areas becoming wet again. Cultivated lands which were at first primarily used for growing grain thus became too wet and the switch was made to dairy farming. A new area behind the existing field was then cultivated, heading deeper into the wild. This cycle repeated itself several times until the different developments met each other and no further undeveloped land was available. All land was then used for grazing cattle.

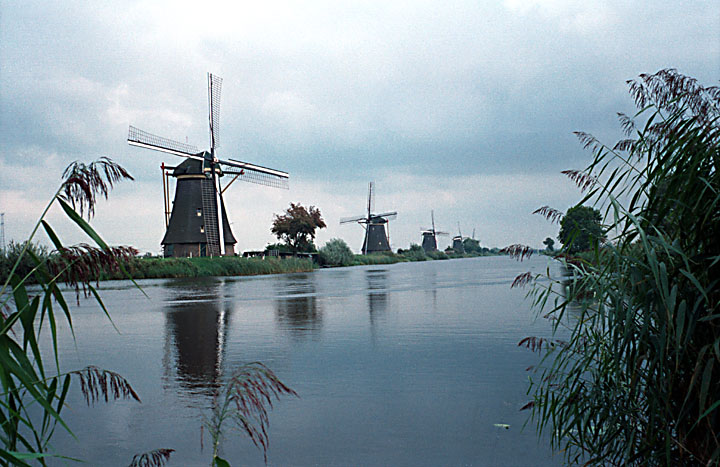
The windmills of Kinderdijk, the Netherlands

Because of the continuous land subsidence it became ever more difficult to remove excess water. The mouths of streams and rivers were dammed to prevent high water levels flowing back upstream and overflowing cultivated lands. These dams had a wooden culvert equipped with a valve, allowing drainage but preventing water from flowing upstream. These dams, however, blocked shipping and the economic activity caused by the need to transship goods caused villages to grow up near the dam, some famous examples are Amsterdam (dam in the river Amstel) and Rotterdam (dam in the Rotte). Only in later centuries were locks developed to allow ships to pass.

Further drainage could only be accomplished after the development of the polder windmill in the 15th century. The wind-driven water pump has become one of the trademark tourist attractions of the Netherlands. The first drainage mills using a scoop wheel could raise water at most 1.5 m. By combining mills the pumping height could be increased. Later mills were equipped with an Archimedes' screw which could raise water much higher. The polders, now often below sea level, were kept dry with mills pumping water from the polder ditches and canals to the boezem ("bosom"), a system of canals and lakes connecting the different polders and acting as a storage basin until the water could be let out to river or sea, either by a sluice gate at low tide or using further pumps. This system is still in use today, though drainage mills have been replaced by first steam and later diesel and electric pumping stations.

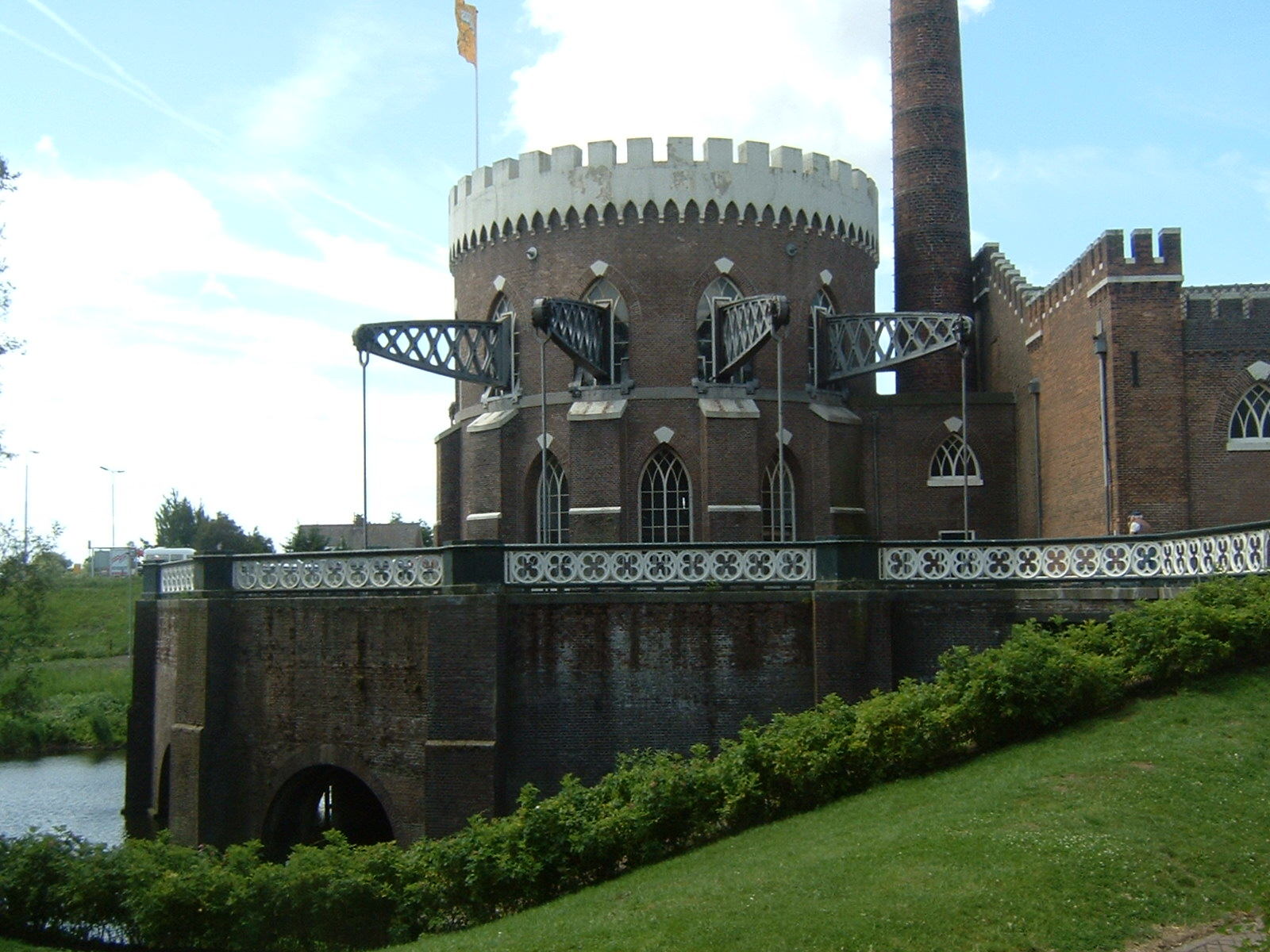
De Cruquius is one of the three pumping stations that drained the Haarlemmermeer

The growth of towns and industry in the Middle Ages resulted in an increased demand for dried peat as fuel. First all the peat down to the groundwater table was dug away. In the 16th century a method was developed to dig peat below water, using a dredging net on a long pole. Large scale peat dredging was taken up by companies, supported by investors from the cities.

These undertakings often devastated the landscape as agricultural land was dug away and the leftover ridges, used for drying the peat, collapsed under the action of waves. Small lakes were created which quickly grew in area, every increase in surface water leading to more leverage of the wind on the water to attack more land. It even led to villages being lost to the waves of human-made lakes.

The development of the polder mill gave the option of draining the lakes. In the 16th century this work was started on small, shallow lakes, continuing with ever-larger and deeper lakes, though it was not until in the 19th century that the most dangerous of lakes, the Haarlemmermeer near Amsterdam, was drained using steam power. Drained lakes and new polders can often be easily distinguished on topographic maps by their different regular division pattern as compared to their older surroundings. Millwright and hydraulic engineer Jan Leeghwater has become famous for his involvement in these works.

== Control of river floods ==
Three major European rivers, the Rhine, Meuse, and Scheldt, flow through the Netherlands, of which the Rhine and Meuse cross the country from east to west.

The first large construction works on the rivers were conducted by the Romans. Nero Claudius Drusus was responsible for building a dam in the Rhine to divert water from the river branches Waal to the Nederrijn and possibly for connecting the river IJssel, previously only a small stream, to the Rhine. Whether these were intended as flood control measures or just for military defense and transport purposes is unclear.

The first river dikes appeared near the river mouths in the 11th century, where incursions from the sea added to the danger from high water levels on the river. Local rulers dammed branches of rivers to prevent flooding on their lands (Graaf van Holland, c. 1160, Kromme Rijn; Floris V, 1285, Hollandse IJssel), only to cause problems to others living further upstream. Large scale deforestation upstream caused the river levels to become ever more extreme while the demand for arable land led to more land being protected by dikes, giving less space to the river stream bed and so causing even higher water levels. Local dikes to protect villages were connected to create a ban dike to contain the river at all times. These developments meant that while the regular floods for the first inhabitants of the river valleys were just a nuisance, in contrast the later incidental floods when dikes burst were much more destructive.

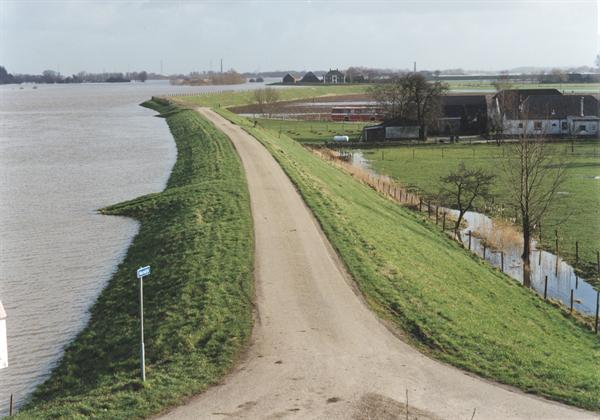
The Nederrijn in 1995

The 17th and 18th centuries were a period of many infamous river floods resulting in much loss of life. They were often caused by ice dams blocking the river. Land reclamation works, large willow plantations and building in the winter bed of the river all worsened the problem. Next to the obvious clearing of the winter bed, overflows (overlaten) were created. These were intentionally low dikes where the excess water could be diverted downstream. The land in such a diversion channel was kept clear of buildings and obstructions. As this so-called green river could therefore essentially only be used for grazing cattle it was in later centuries seen as a wasteful use of land. Most overflows have now been removed, focusing instead on stronger dikes and more control over the distribution of water across the river branches. To achieve this canals such as the Pannerdens Kanaal and Nieuwe Merwede were dug.

A committee reported in 1977 about the weakness of the river dikes, but there was too much resistance from the local population against demolishing houses and straightening and strengthening the old meandering dikes. It took the flood threats in 1993 and again in 1995, when over 200,000 people had to be evacuated and the dikes only just held, to put plans into action. Now the risk of a river flooding has been reduced from once every 100 years to once every 1,250 years. Further works in the Room for the River project are being carried out to give the rivers more space to flood and in this way reducing the flood height.

== Water control boards ==
The first dikes and water control structures were built and maintained by those directly benefiting from them, mostly farmers. As the structures got more extensive and complex councils were formed from people with a common interest in the control of water levels on their land and so the first water boards began to emerge. These often controlled only a small area, a single polder or dike. Later they merged or an overall organization was formed when different water boards had conflicting interests. The original water boards differed much from each other in the organisation, power, and area that they managed. The differences were often regional and were dictated by differing circumstances, whether they had to defend a sea dike against a storm surge or keep the water level in a polder within bounds. In the middle of the 20th century there were about 2,700 water control boards. After many mergers there are currently 21 water boards left. Water boards hold separate elections, levy taxes, and function independently from other government bodies.

The dikes were maintained by the individuals who benefited from their existence, every farmer having been designated part of the dike to maintain, with a three-yearly viewing by the water board directors. The old rule "Whom the water hurts, he the water stops" (Wie het water deert, die het water keert) meant that those living at the dike had to pay and care for it. This led to haphazard maintenance and it is believed that many floods would not have happened or would not have been as severe if the dikes had been in better condition. Those living further inland often refused to pay or help in the upkeep of the dikes though they were just as much affected by floods, while those living at the dike itself could go bankrupt from having to repair a breached dike.

Rijkswaterstaat (Directorate General for Public Works and Water Management) was set up in 1798 under French rule to put water control in the Netherlands under a central government. Local waterboards however were too attached to their autonomy and for most of the time Rijkswaterstaat worked alongside the local waterboards. Rijkswaterstaat has been responsible for many major water control structures and was later and still is also involved in building railroads and highways.

Water boards may try new experiments like the sand engine off the coast of South Holland.

== Notorious floods ==
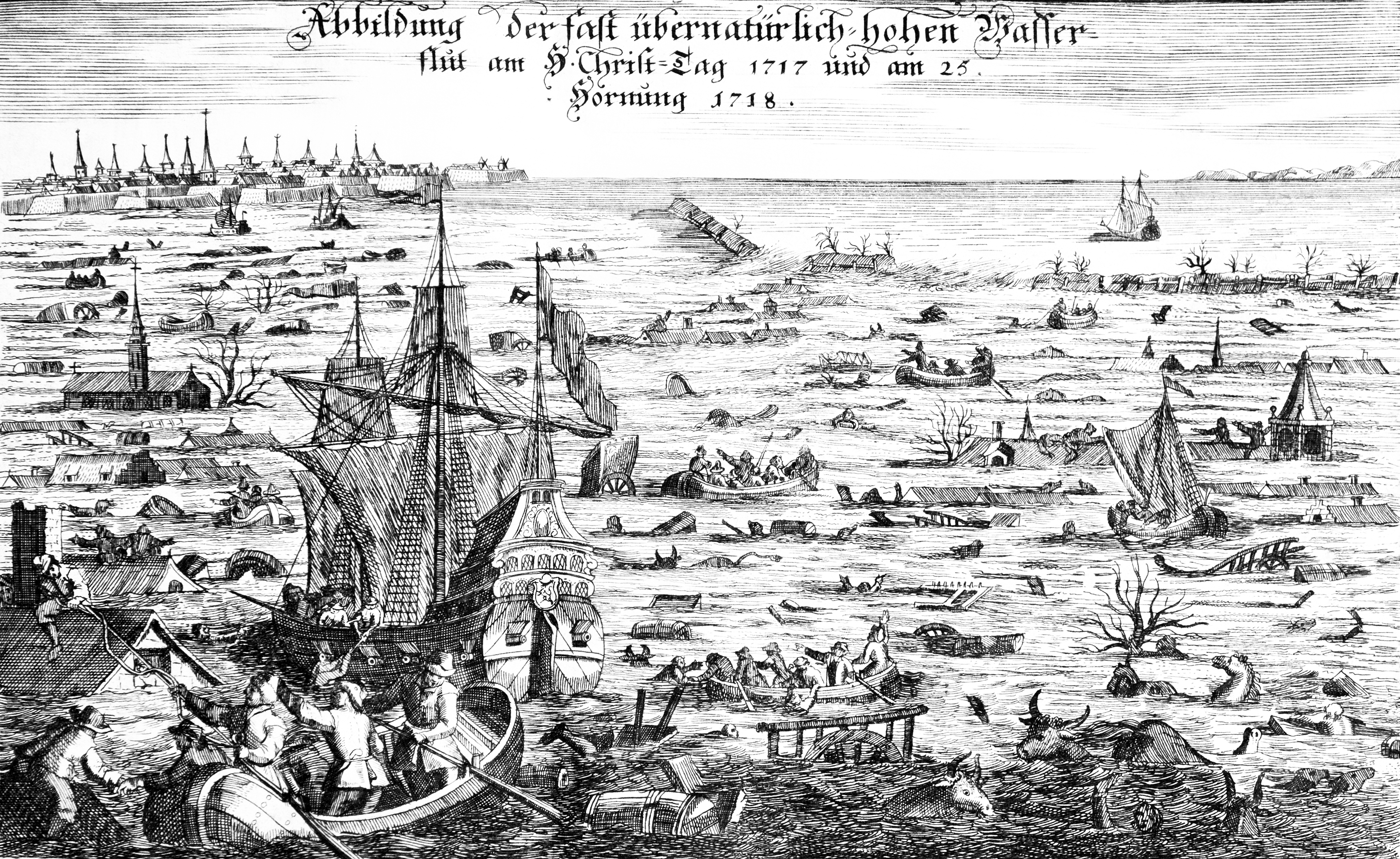
The Christmas Flood of 1717

Over the years there have been many storm surges and floods in the Netherlands. Some deserve special mention as they particularly have changed the contours of the Netherlands.

A series of devastating storm surges, more or less starting with the First All Saints' flood (Allerheiligenvloed) in 1170 washed away a large area of peat marshes, enlarging the Wadden Sea and connecting the previously existing Lake Almere in the middle of the country to the North Sea, thereby creating the Zuiderzee. It in itself would cause much trouble until the building of the Afsluitdijk in 1933.

Several storms starting in 1219 created the Dollart from the mouth of the river Ems. By 1520 the Dollart had reached its largest area. Reiderland, containing several towns and villages, was lost. Much of this land was later reclaimed.

In 1421 the St. Elizabeth's flood caused the loss of De Grote Waard in the southwest of the country. Particularly the digging of peat near the dike for salt production and neglect because of a civil war caused dikes to fail, which created the Biesbosch, now a valued nature reserve.

The more recent floodings of 1916 and 1953 gave rise to building the Afsluitdijk and Deltaworks respectively.

== Flooding as military defense ==
The Defence Line of Amsterdam used flooding as a protective measure

The deliberate inundating of certain areas can allow a military defensive line to be created. In case of an advancing enemy army, the area was to be inundated with about 30 cm (1 ft) of water, too shallow for boats but deep enough to make advance on foot difficult by hiding underwater obstacles such as canals, ditches, and purpose-built traps. Dikes crossing the flooded area and other strategic points were to be protected by fortifications. The system proved successful on the Hollandic Water Line in rampjaar 1672 during the Third Anglo-Dutch War but was overcome in 1795 because of heavy frost. It was also used with the Stelling van Amsterdam, the Grebbe line and the IJssel Line. The advent of heavier artillery and especially airplanes have made that strategy largely obsolete.

== Modern developments ==
Technological development in the 20th century meant that larger projects could be undertaken to further improve the safety against flooding and to reclaim large areas of land. The most important are the Zuiderzee Works and the Delta Works. By the end of the 20th century all sea inlets have been closed off from the sea by dams and barriers. Only the Westerschelde needs to remain open for shipping access to the port of Antwerp. Plans to reclaim parts of the Wadden Sea and the Markermeer were eventually called off because of the ecological and recreational values of these waters.

=== Zuiderzee Works ===
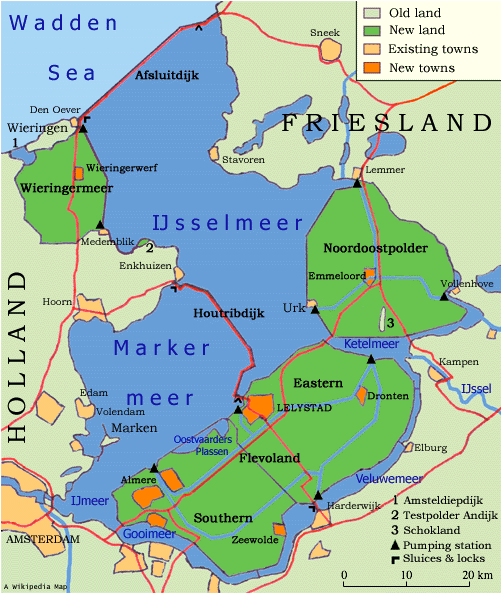
The Zuiderzee Works turned the Zuiderzee into a fresh water lake IJsselmeer, and created 1650 km² of land.

The Zuiderzee Works (Zuiderzeewerken) are a system of dams, land reclamation, and water drainage works. The basis of the project was the damming off of the Zuiderzee, a large shallow inlet of the North Sea. This dam, called the Afsluitdijk, was built in 1932–33, separating the Zuiderzee from the North Sea. As result, the Zuider sea became the IJsselmeer—IJssel lake.

Following the damming, large areas of land were reclaimed in the newly freshwater lake body by means of polders. The works were performed in several steps from 1920 to 1975. Engineer Cornelis Lely played a major part in its design and as statesman in the authorization of its construction.

=== Delta Works ===
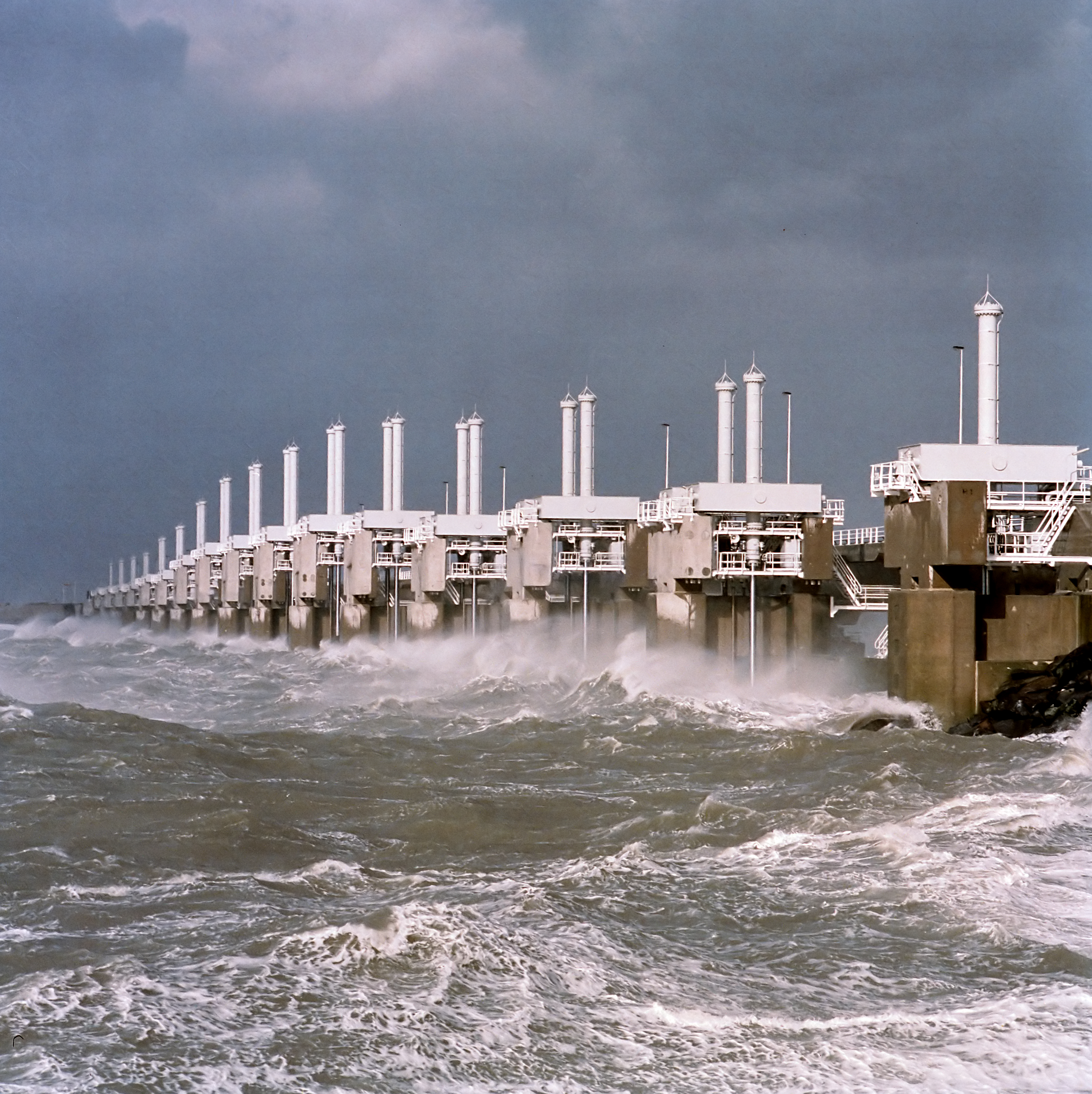
Oosterscheldekering at work during a storm.

A study done by Rijkswaterstaat in 1937 showed that the sea defenses in the southwest river delta were inadequate to withstand a major storm surge. The proposed solution was to dam all the river mouths and sea inlets thereby shortening the coast. However, because of the scale of this project and the intervention of the Second World War its construction was delayed and the first works were only completed in 1950. The North Sea flood of 1953 gave a major impulse to speed up the project. In the following years a number of dams were built to close off the estuary mouths. In 1976, under pressures from environmental groups and the fishing industry, it was decided not to close off the Oosterschelde estuary by a solid dam but instead to build the Oosterscheldekering, a storm surge barrier which is only closed during storms. It is the most well-known (and most expensive) dam of the project. A second major hurdle for the works was in the Rijnmond area. A storm surge through the Nieuwe Waterweg would threaten about 1.5 million people around Rotterdam. However, closing off this river mouth would be very detrimental for the Dutch economy, as the Port of Rotterdam—one of the biggest sea ports in the world—uses this river mouth. Eventually, the Maeslantkering was built in 1997, keeping economical factors in mind: the Maeslantkering is a set of two swinging doors that can shut off the river mouth when necessary, but which are usually open. The Maeslantkering is forecast to close about once per decade. Up until September 2025, it has closed twice, in 2007 and 2023.

== Current situation and future ==
The current sea defenses are stronger than ever, but experts warn that complacency would be a mistake. New calculation methods revealed numerous weak spots. Sea level rise could increase the mean sea level by one to two meters by the end of this century, with even more following. This, land subsidence, and increased storms make further upgrades to the flood control and water management infrastructure necessary.

The sea defenses are continuously being strengthened and raised to meet the safety norm of a flood chance of once every 10,000 years for the west, which is the economic heart and most densely populated part of the Netherlands, and once every 4,000 years for less densely populated areas. The primary flood defenses are tested against this norm every five years. In 2010 about 800 km of dikes out of a total of 3,500 km failed to meet the norm. This does not mean there is an immediate flooding risk; it is the result of the norm's becoming more strict from the results of scientific research on, for example, wave action and sea level rise.

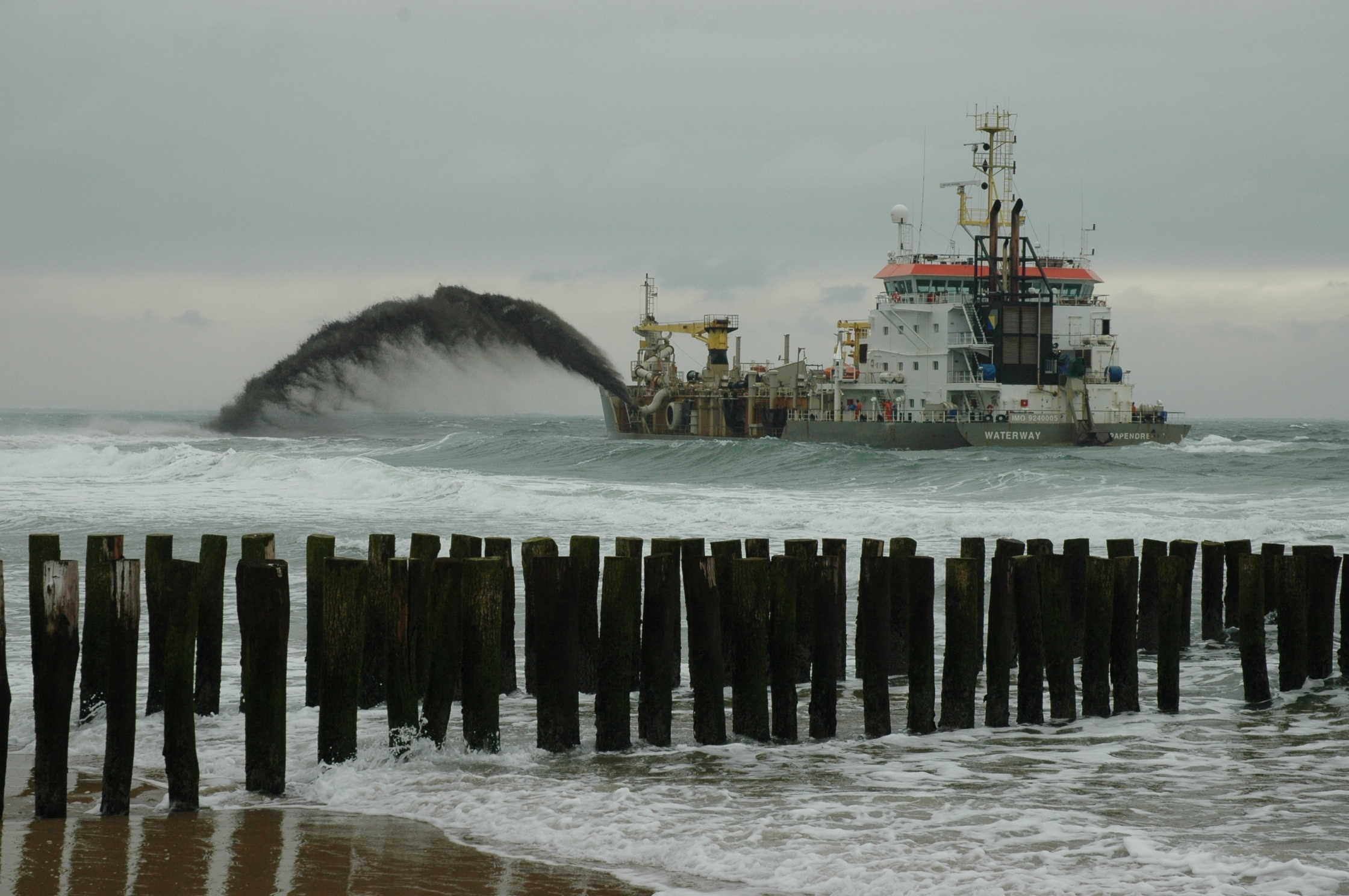
Sand replenishment in front of a Dutch beach

The amount of coastal erosion is compared against the so-called "reference coastline" (Dutch: basiskustlijn), the average coastline in 1990. Sand replenishment is used where beaches have retreated too far. About 12 million m^{3} of sand are deposited yearly on the beaches and below the waterline in front of the coast.

The Stormvloedwaarschuwingsdienst (SVSD; Storm Surge Warning Service) makes a water level forecast in case of a storm surge and warns the responsible parties in the affected coastal districts. These can then take appropriate measures depending on the expected water levels, such as evacuating areas outside the dikes, closing barriers and in extreme cases patrolling the dikes during the storm.

The Second Delta Committee, or Veerman Committee, officially Staatscommissie voor Duurzame Kustontwikkeling (State Committee for Durable Coast Development) gave its advice in 2008. It expects a sea level rise of 65 to 130 cm by the year 2100. Among its suggestions are:

- to increase the safety norms tenfold and strengthen dikes accordingly,
- to use sand replenishment to broaden the North Sea coast and allow it to grow naturally,
- to use the lakes in the southwest river delta as river water retention basins,
- to raise the water level in the IJsselmeer to provide freshwater.

These measures would cost approximately 1 billion euros/year.

=== Room for the River ===
Global warming in the 21st century might result in a rise in sea level which could overwhelm the measures the Netherlands has taken to control floods. The Room for the River project allows for periodic flooding of indefensible lands. In such regions residents have been removed to higher ground, some of which has been raised above anticipated flood levels.
