= Bathse spuisluis =

Water control structure in the Netherlands

Coordinates: 51.3932°N 4.2346°E

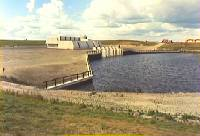
Image of the Bathse Spuisluis near Bath.

The Bathse spuisluis is a sluice that is part of the Delta Works near the hamlet of Bath in the municipality of Reimerswaal in the Dutch province Zeeland.

The sluice was not constructed as a defense against the water, like many of the structures in the Delta Works, but was constructed together with the Bath drainage canal to drain fresh water from the Volkerak, Zoommeer, and Markiezaatsmeer and the Scheldt–Rhine Canal being flushed (this no longer happened automatically due to the damming of these waters). By allowing fresh water to pass through via the Volkerakdam, clean water is allowed to flow into the area. The old, polluted water is sent through the Spuikanaal Bath and discharged through the Bathse spuisluis into the Western Scheldt. The Bathse spuisluis is also used to discharge water from West Brabant, which is drained from the northern part of the Scheldt-Rhine Canal.

The Bathse spuisluis is located at the end of the 8.4-kilometre-long (5.2 mi) Spuikanaal Bath that runs parallel to the Scheldt-Rhine Canal. The sluice consists of six concrete tubes, allowing fresh water to flow into the Western Scheldt. The sluice can allow 330 m^{3} per second to be discharged. However, discharging is only possible when the water level of the Western Scheldt is lower than in the canal, as there are no pumps within the sluice.

Construction started in 1980, and in 1987 both the sluice and canal were opened.
