= Europoortkering =

Dike structure in Rotterdam, NL

Coordinates: 51°57′18.98″N 4°09′49.63″E

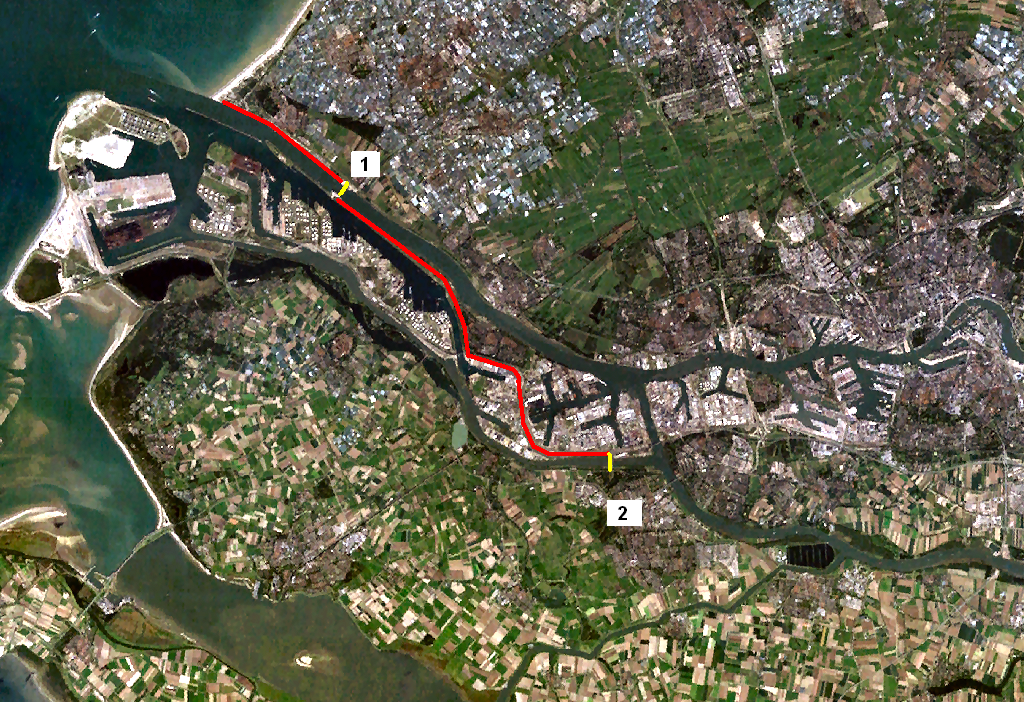
Satellite picture of the Europoort (dating from before the creation of Maasvlakte 2).: 1. Maeslantkering (on the Nieuwe Waterweg).; 2. Hartelkering (on the Hartelkanaal).; In red: strengthening of the dikes

The Europoortkering or barrier of the Europoort is a program of engineering works in addition to the Delta Plan, designed to protect the maritime access routes from the port of Rotterdam and thus, the entire South Holland against storms and tides.

The original Delta Plan provided no closure of the Western Scheldt or of the Nieuwe Waterweg to allow access to the ports of Antwerp and Rotterdam.

But regarding the Nieuwe Waterweg and the Hartelkanaal it appeared in the mid-1980s that the levees were not high enough to ensure optimum protection of the territories densely populated South Holland. A heightening of all dikes would be too expensive.

An alternative was found. In 1987 the final decision was taken, the Nieuwe Waterweg will be protected by dikes up to the location of a storm surge barrier, the Maeslantkering at Hook of Holland, and the Hartelkanaal will be protected up to another storm surge barrier, the Hartelkering. Between those two barriers, the raising of all dikes will be required.

The whole work was finally completed in 1997.

The Delta Plan itself protects the Rhine–Meuse–Scheldt delta, so mainly Zeeland, while the Europoortkering protects South Holland and not the Europoort which is situated before those protections.
