= Hartelkering =

Storm surge barrier in the Netherlands

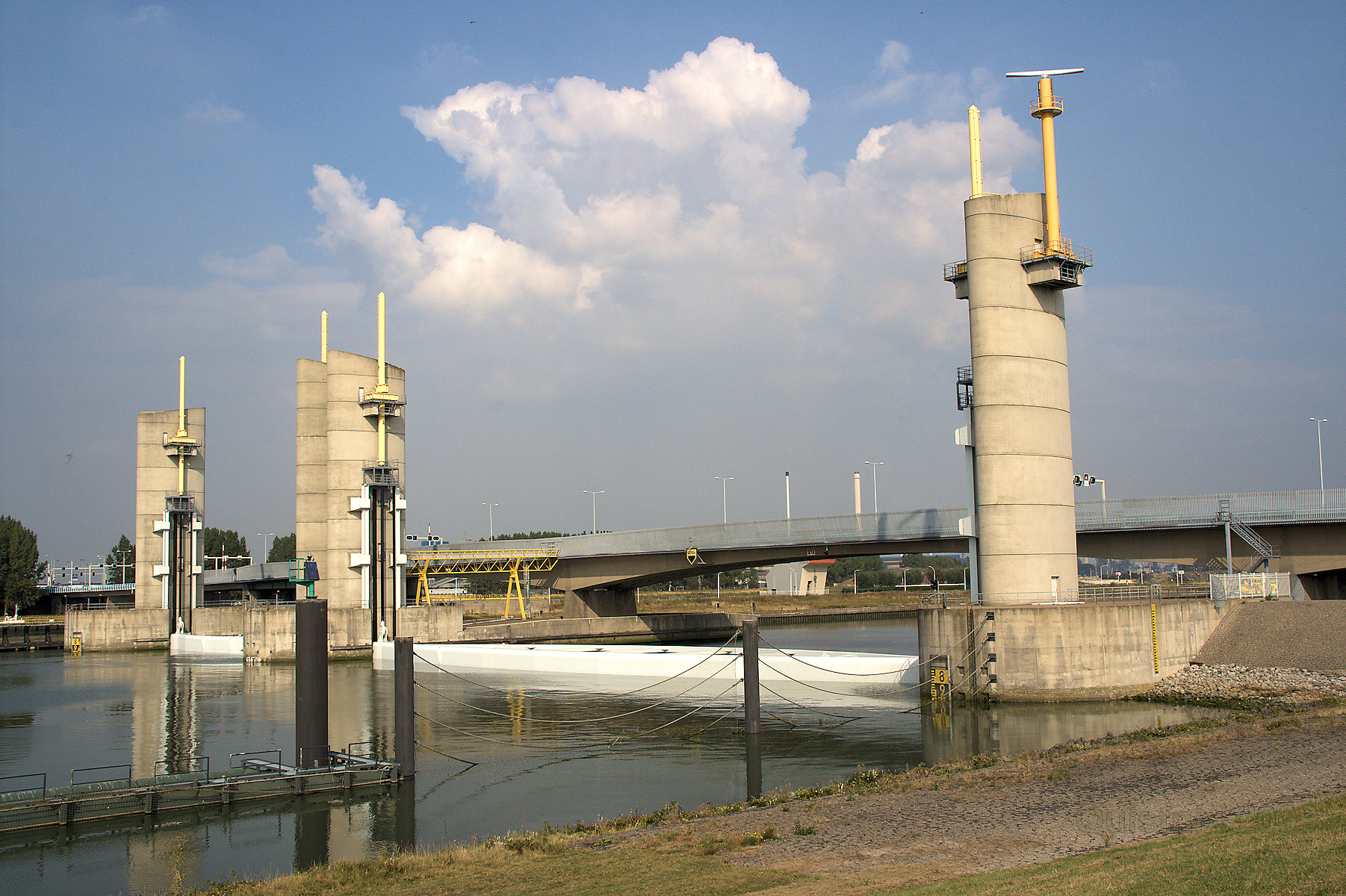
- The closed barrier
- Coordinates: 51°51′58″N 4°18′34″E
- Crosses: Hartelkanaal
- Locale: Spijkenisse, Netherlands
- Owner: Rijkswaterstaat

Characteristics
- Material: Concrete, steel
- Longest span: 98 metres (322 ft)
- No. of spans: 2

History
- Construction start: 1991
- Construction end: 1997

The Hartelkering (English: Hartel barrier) is a storm surge barrier in Spijkenisse, Netherlands. The barrier is part of the Europoortkering, itself part of the Delta Works project and is designed to close the Hartelkanaal (nl) in case of a storm surge.

== Overview ==
The barrier consists of two vertical lift gates, 49.3 metres (162 ft) and 98 metres (322 ft) in length. The gates have a height of 3 metres (9.8 ft) above NAP when closed. The water level at this location can become higher, but in order to prevent flooding of the Europoort-area the gates were designed to allow the water to overtop the gates in extreme situations. The amount of water would be too small to cause any problems in the protected area but it does limit the surgelevel in the unprotected areas.

In the raised position the bottom of the gates is at 14 metres (46 ft) above NAP, slightly higher than the Hartelbrug (nl) next to the barrier. The barrier is equipped with a construction to fend off floating debris, which could damage the gates.

The Hartelkering was constructed at the same time as the Maeslantkering as part of the Europoortkering, a system of levees in addition to the two flood barriers. The barrier was built with the expectation to close once per five to ten years. The decision-making algorithm that sequences storm surge-triggered events in the Maeslantkering is run entirely by computer.

== 8 November 2007 storm ==
On 8 November 2007 a storm from the north-west hit the Dutch coast. A storm surge, high enough to start the barrier's closing procedure, occurred. The barrier was closed due to a storm surge for the first time since its construction. As the Oosterscheldekering and Maeslantkering storm surge barriers were also closed, the entire Dutch coast was protected against flooding for the first time since 1976. The closing procedure of the hartelkering started at 23.10h. The reopening took place on 9 November at 19.25h.
