= Maeslantkering =

Dutch storm surge barrier

Coordinates: 51°57′19″N 4°9′50″E

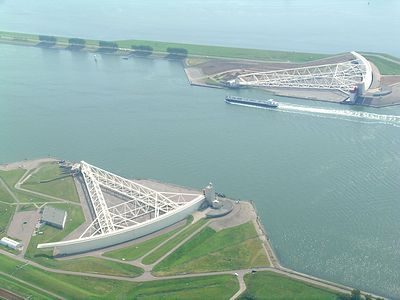
The Maeslant Barrier seen from the north

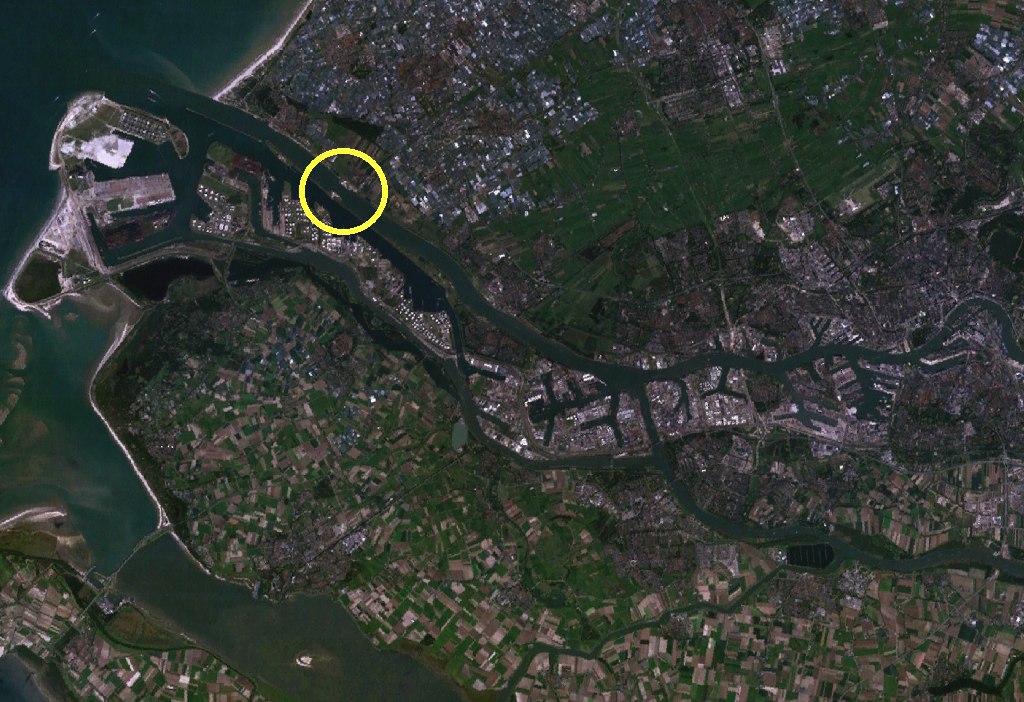
Location of the Maeslant Barrier

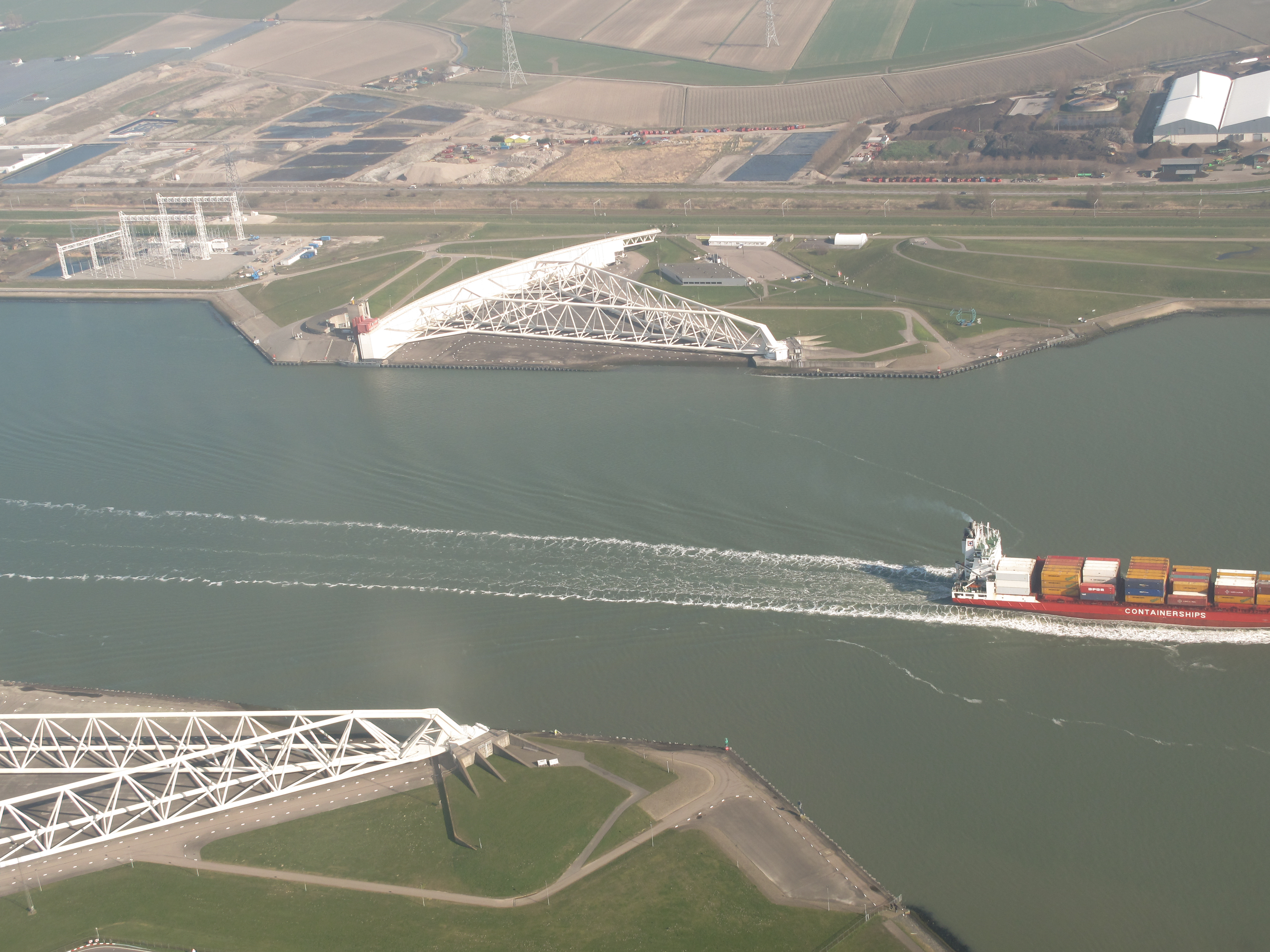
A ship passing the barrier

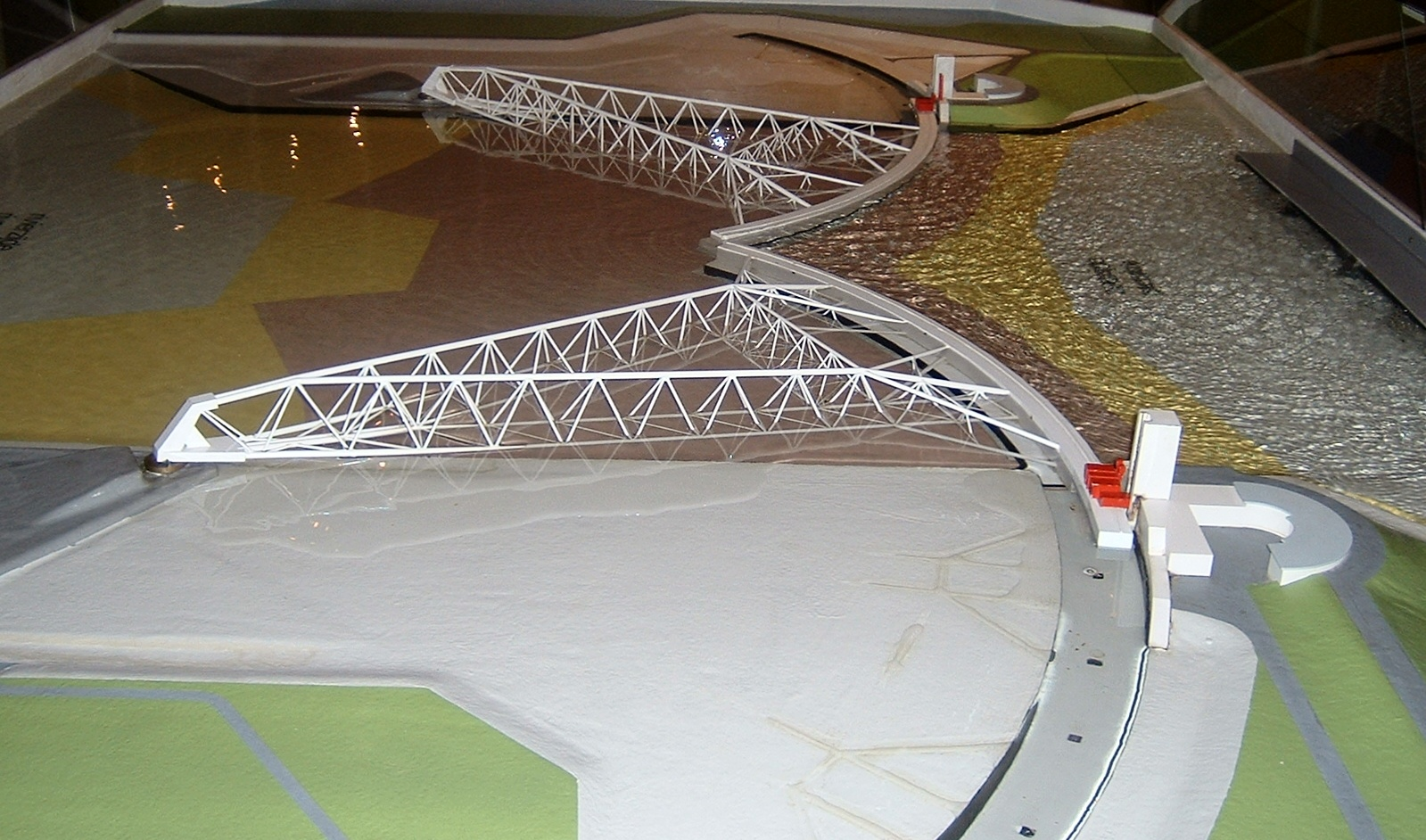
Model (no longer present)

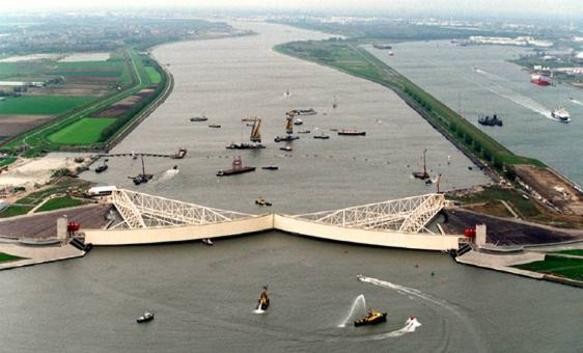
The Maeslantkering closed

The Maeslantkering 'Maeslant barrier' is a storm surge barrier on the Nieuwe Waterweg, in South Holland, Netherlands. It was constructed from 1991 to 1997. As part of the Delta Works, the barrier responds to water level predictions calculated by a centralized computer system called BOS. It automatically closes when Rotterdam, especially the Port of Rotterdam, is threatened with flooding.

Maeslantkering has two 210-metre long barrier gates, with two 237-metre long steel trusses holding each. When closed, the barrier protects the entire width (360 metres) of the Nieuwe Waterweg, the main waterway of Port of Rotterdam. It is one of the largest moving structures on Earth, rivalling the Green Bank Telescope in the United States and the Bagger 288 excavator in Germany.

== The Maeslant Barrier ==
=== The initial plan ===
The construction of the Maeslantkering was a part of the Europoortkering project which, in turn, was the final stage of the Delta Works. The main objective of this Europoortkering-project was to improve the safety against flooding of the Rotterdam harbour, of which the Europoort is an important part, and the surrounding towns and agricultural areas. To achieve this, the initial plan was to reinforce existing dikes as far as 50 kilometres inland. During the 1980s, it became clear that this project would take at least 30 years and would cost a huge amount of money. It would also mean that historic town centres, in some cases over four centuries old, would have to be broken down and rebuilt behind renewed, larger dikes.

Therefore, the initial plan was put aside and the Ministry of Waterways and Public Works organised a competition in which construction companies could make plans for the construction of a reliable yet relatively cheap storm surge barrier.

=== The storm surge barrier ===
This storm surge barrier had to be located in the waterway (Nieuwe Maas – the Scheur – Nieuwe Waterweg) that connects Rotterdam with the North Sea. This played an important role in the planning stage of the construction, as this waterway is the main route to the port of Rotterdam, at that time the world's largest port. Therefore, a barrier like the Dutch Oosterscheldekering and the Thames Barrier could not be constructed, as such a barrier would block the shipping route.

The winning plan called for two large floating gates on both dikes of the waterway. A major advantage of this plan was that construction of the storm surge barrier could take place under dry conditions, in dry docks. Other advantages were that no vital parts of the barrier had to be placed under water, and maintenance of the barrier would be easy because of the dry docks. Finally, there would be almost no inconvenience for passing ships. The winning plan was put forward by the BMK consortium (Bouwcombinatie Maeslantkering). This consortium included the contractors HBG (now BAM), Volker Stevin and Hollandia Kloos. The storm surge barrier project was one of the first large Design and Construct projects for which the contractor also prepares the design.

=== Construction of the barrier ===
The construction of the barrier started in 1991. First, the dry docks were constructed on both shores and a sill was constructed at the bottom of the Nieuwe Waterweg. Then, the two 22-metre high and 210-metre long steel gates were built. After this, 237-metre long steel trusses were welded to the gates. The arms weigh 6,800 tonnes each. The main purpose of the arms is transmitting the immense forces, exerted on the gates while closed, to one single joint at the rear of each gate. During the closing or opening process, this ball-shaped joint gives the gate the opportunity to move freely under the influences of water, wind, and waves. It acts like a ball and socket joint, such as in the human shoulder or hip. The joints were made in the Czech Republic at Škoda Works. The ball-shaped joint is the largest in the world, with a diameter of 10 metres, and weighing 680 tonnes. The construction of the barrier cost 450 million euro. The total Europoortkering-project had cost 660 million euros.

A working 1:250 scale version of the barrier was constructed in the Madurodam miniature village. Its construction took six months. It took six years to construct the real barrier.

=== Maeslantkering in operation ===
On 10 May 1997, after six years of construction, Queen Beatrix opened the Maeslantkering. The barrier is connected to a computer system which is linked to weather and sea level data. Under normal weather conditions, the two doors themselves are well protected in their dry docks and a 360-metre wide gap in the waterway gives ships enough space to pass without any inconvenience. But when a storm surge of 3 metres above normal sea level is anticipated in Rotterdam, the barrier will be closed automatically. Four hours before the actual closing procedure begins, incoming and outgoing ships are warned. Two hours before closing, the traffic at the Nieuwe Waterweg comes to a standstill. Thirty minutes before closing, the dry docks that contain the gates are flooded. After this, the gates start to float and two so-called "locomobiles" move the gates towards each other. When the gap between the gates is about 1.5 metres wide, water is let inside the hollows of the gates, so that they submerge to the bottom of the waterway. The bottom has been elaborately dug and then laid with layers of broken stone, so that the gates are able to form a relatively watertight fit when submerged. In cases where the gates have to be shut for a prolonged period, which would cause the waters of the Rhine to rise behind them, the gate hollows are partly emptied and floated, so that excess river water runs out to sea, before they are submerged again. The decision-making algorithm that sequences storm surge-triggered events in the Maeslantkering is run entirely by computer.

The Maeslantkering is expected to be closed once every ten years due to storm surge. With the rise in sea levels, the storm surge barrier will need to close more frequently in 50 years time, namely once every five years. In its first 10 years of operation, the barrier was never closed due to a storm. There was one incident when a storm surge of 3 metres was predicted and the protective sequence was initiated. However, during the course of the storm, predictions were revised to a 2.99 m surge and the computer cancelled closure. Eventually, the surge passed harmlessly and the waterway remained open. During the evening of 8 November 2007, the barrier was closed due to a storm surge for the first time. The barrier is closed for testing once a year, usually at the end of September or the beginning of October, just before the beginning of the storm season in mid-October. Activities are held during the closing for the visiting public. The information center publishes information about the closing time and activities on its website.

The Caland canal, located just south of the Nieuwe Waterweg and the Scheur, visible in some images on this page, is protected by the much smaller Hartelkering storm surge barrier. This barrier is constructed some 5 kilometres further inland.

The software that drives it is written in C++ and consists of 200,000 lines of code for the operational system and 250,000 lines of code for the simulation systems.

The barrier is designed to withstand a storm that has an occurrence of only once in 10,000 years (based on the climate at the time, but this may have to be adjusted for climate change).

=== 8 November 2007 storm ===
In order to test the barrier in actual stormy conditions, the water level threshold at which the computer system would start the closing procedure was lowered from 3.0 m over NAP to 2.6 m, for the duration of the 2007 storm season. On 8 November 2007, a storm from the northwest hit the Dutch coast. A storm surge, high enough to start the barrier's closing procedure, occurred. The barrier was closed due to a storm surge for the first time since its construction. As the Oosterscheldekering and Hartelkering storm surge barriers were also closed, the entire Dutch coast was protected against flooding for the first time since 1976. At 22:00 local time (CET), Dutch TV brought the news that maritime traffic on the Nieuwe Waterweg was shut off. The closing procedure of the Maeslantkering started at 23:10. The barrier was completely closed at 01:00 and was reopened on 9 November around 17:00.

=== 21 December 2023 storm ===
On 21 December 2023 the Maeslantkering was closed automatically at the 3.0 m threshold for the first time in history. During the day a forecast had been made that the water level in Rotterdam would reach critical height of 3.0 m above NAP at around 23:30. There were discussions to close the Maeslantkering manually before that time, and the Port of Rotterdam started reducing traffic at 16:00. Around 18:00 the traffic across the Nieuwe Waterweg came to a complete standstill. Before the decision was actually made to manually close the Maeslantkering, the computer systems intervened and had begun the automatic closing procedure. Closing started at 20:15, a process which takes about 2 hours. The next day at 4:45 the gates were opened again.

== Het Keringhuis, Publiekscentrum Water ==
At the site of the Maeslantkering, there is a visitor center where more background information on water management and the technical details of the barrier itself can be found.

== In popular culture ==
- The barrier was featured on the American television program Extreme Engineering (season 1, episode 8: Holland's Barriers to the Sea).
- The barrier served as a major plot point for the children's book Mission Hurricane of the 39 Clues series.
- The barrier was also featured on the History Channel television program Modern Marvels during Levees Education (2006).
- The barrier was featured in the 2021 Neal Stephenson novel Termination Shock.
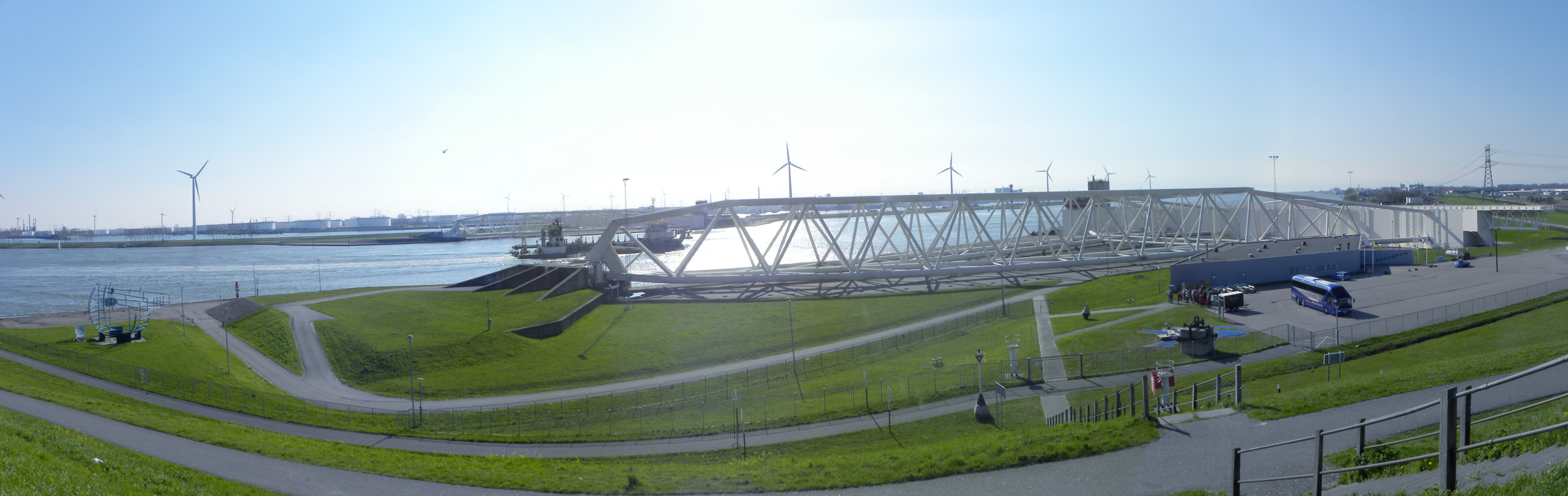
Panorama of the Maeslantkering

== See also ==
- Navigation Pass S-1 of Saint Petersburg Dam
