= Lent, Gelderland =

Lent
- Neighbourhood and former village
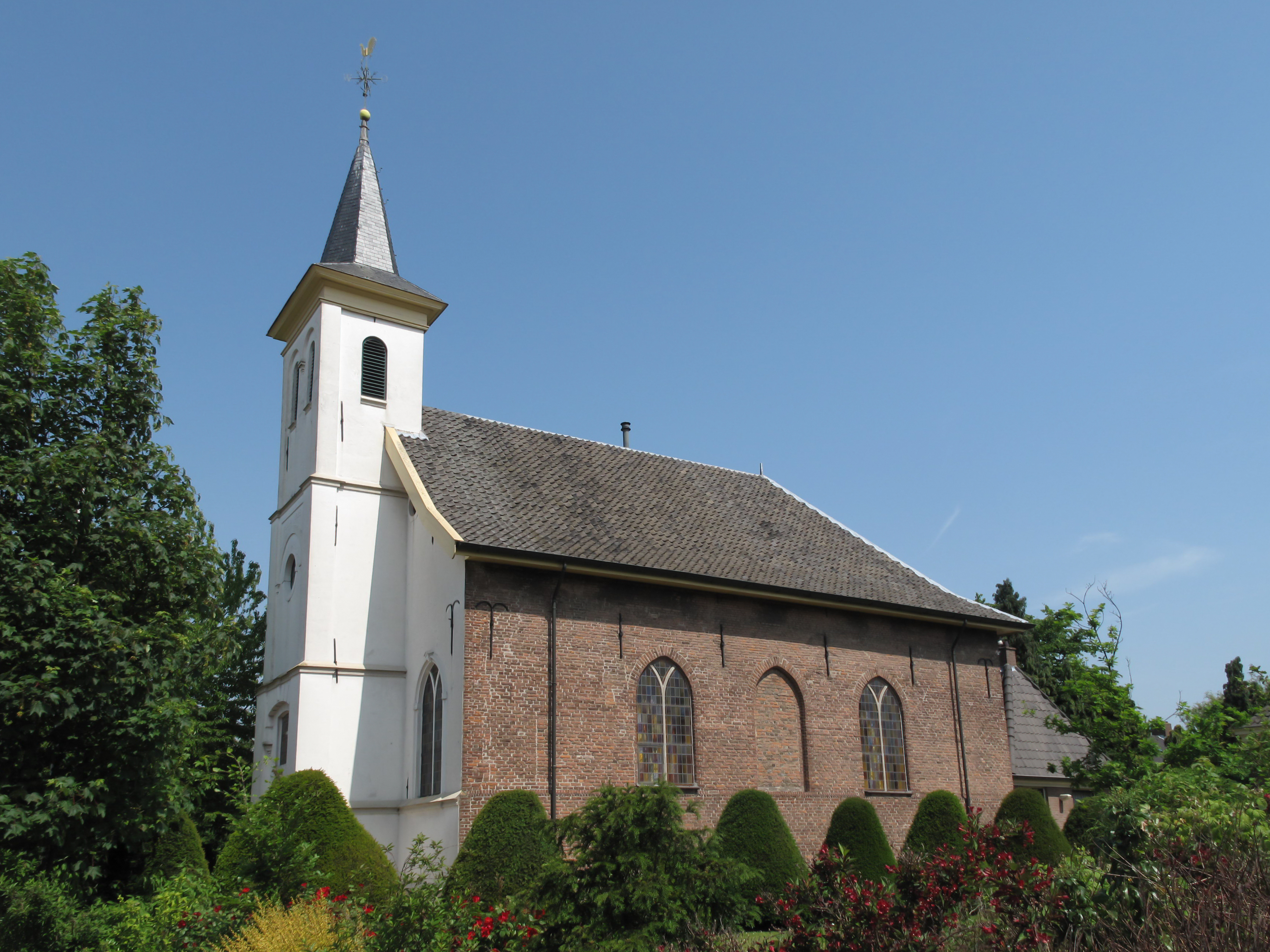
- Church of Lent

- Location in the province of Gelderland in the Netherlands Lent (Netherlands)
- Coordinates: 51°52′N 5°52′E
- Country: Netherlands
- Province: Gelderland
- Municipality: Nijmegen

Area
  - Total: 7.18 km^{2} (2.77 sq mi)
- Elevation: 10 m (33 ft)

Population (2021)
  - Total: 11,630
  - Density: 1,620/km^{2} (4,200/sq mi)
- Time zone: UTC+1 (CET)
  - Summer (DST): UTC+2 (CEST)
- Postal code: 6663
- Dialing code: 024

Lent (Dutch pronunciation: [lɛnt]) is a village in the Dutch province of Gelderland. It is located in the municipality of Nijmegen, about 2 km north of that city, on the north bank of the Waal river.

== History ==
The village was first mentioned in 1196 as in Lente. The etymology is unclear.

The Dutch Reformed church dates from 1329. The tower was added in 1886. Lent was home to 1,171 people in 1840.

Lent was a separate municipality until 1818, when it was merged with Elst. In 1998, it was merged into Nijmegen. The population at the time of merger was about 3,000 people, however it almost quadrupled in 20 years due to neighbourhoods being built in Lent.

== Gallery ==
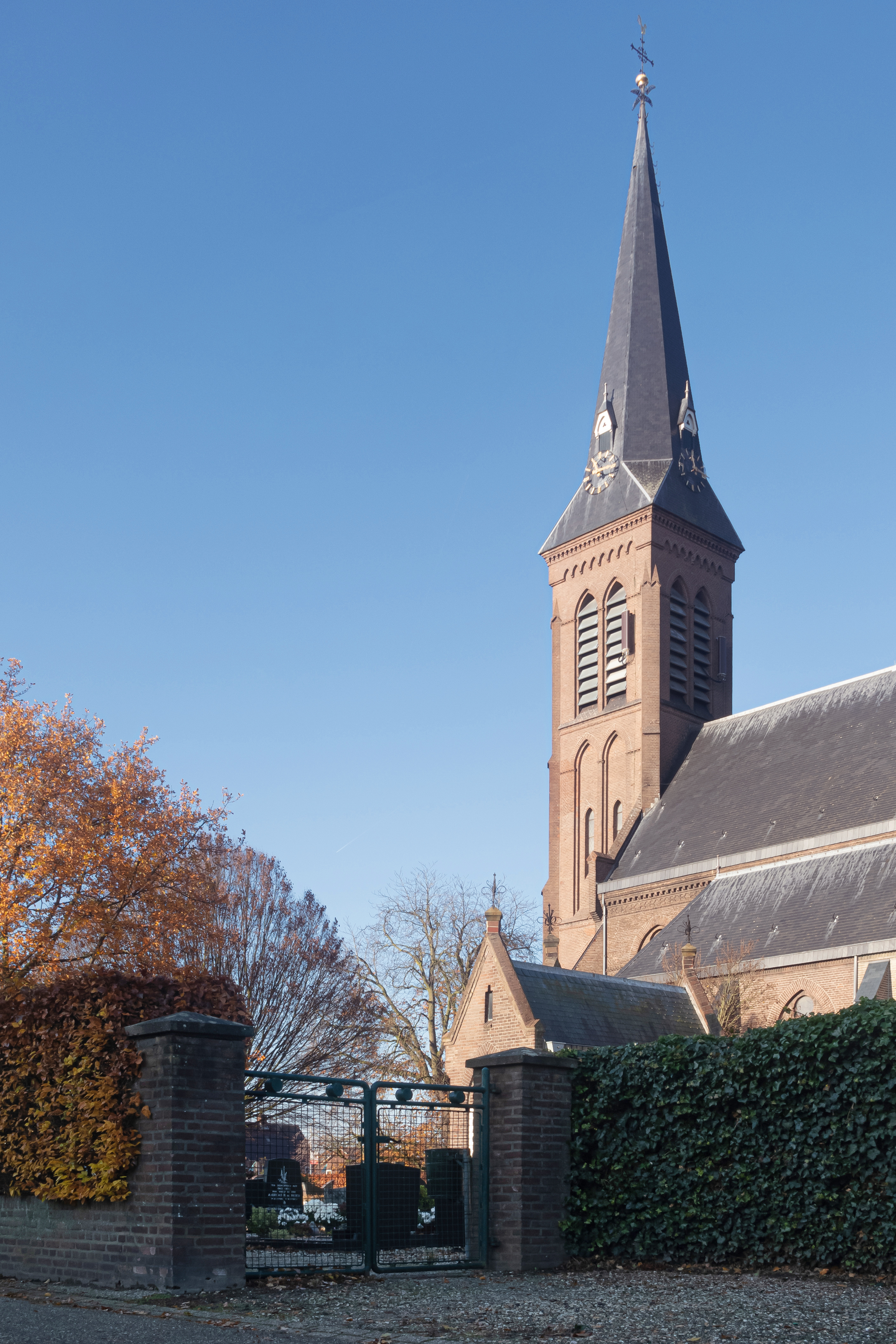
Lent, church: the Maria Geboortekerk

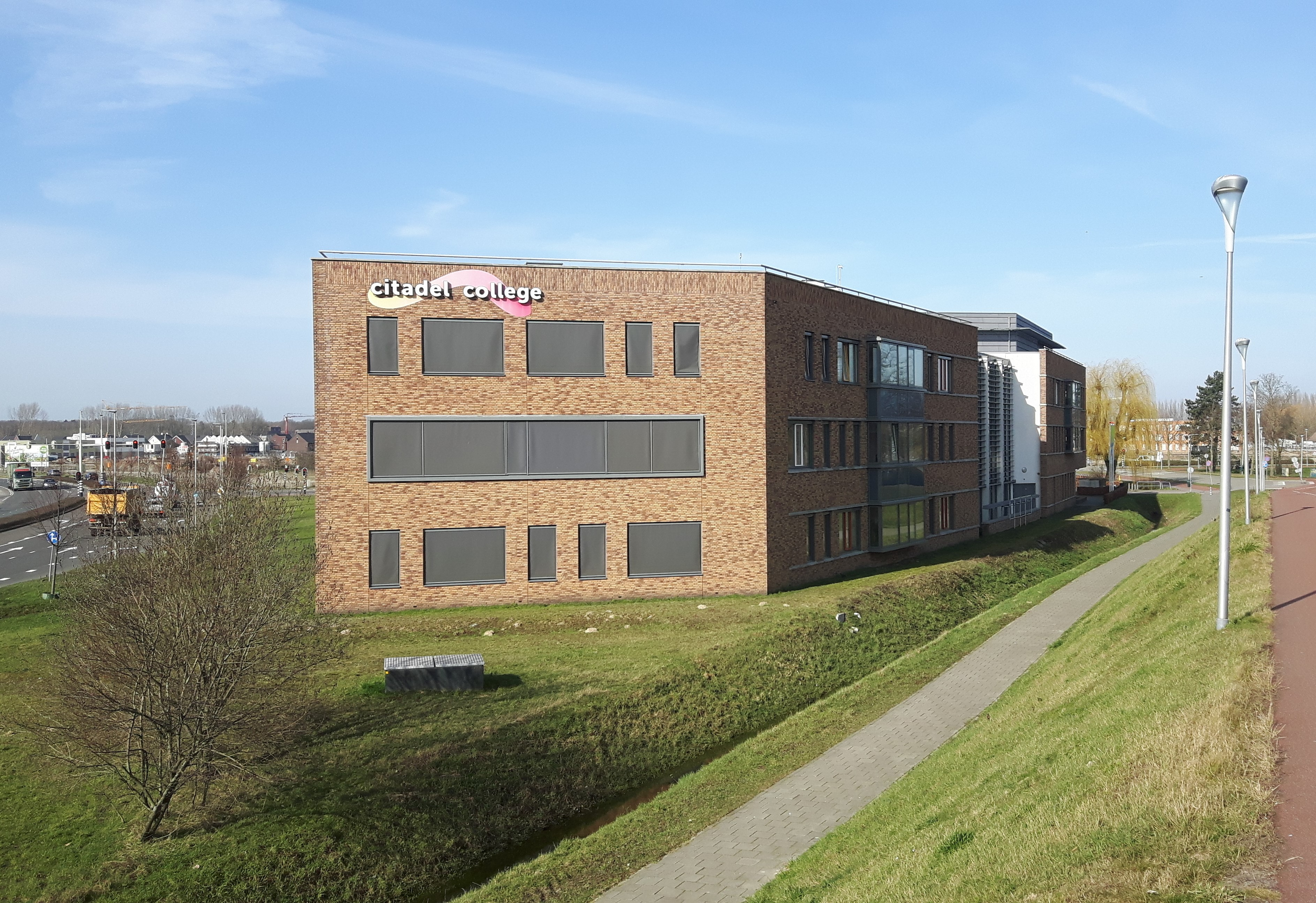
School in Lent

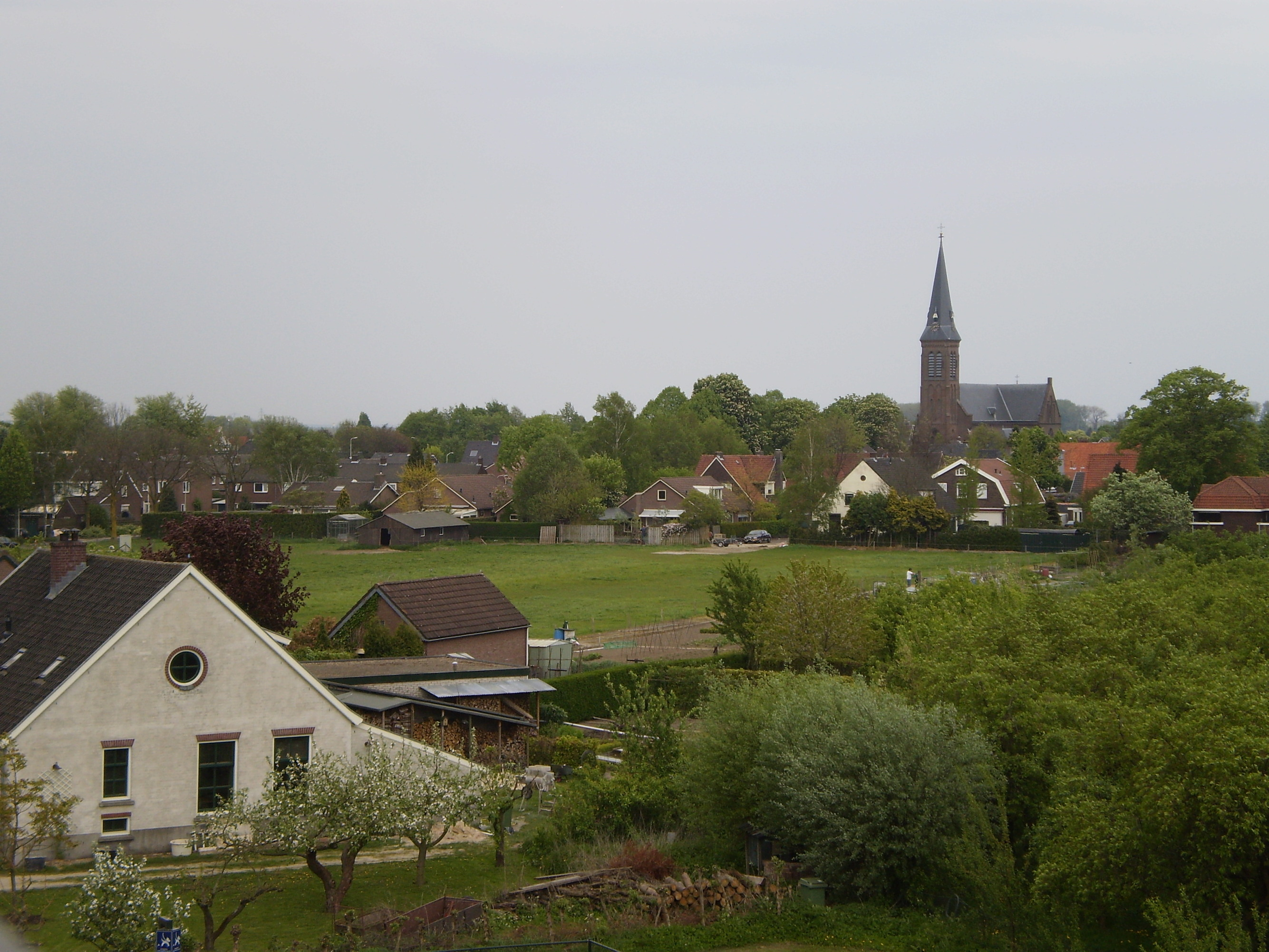
Village view

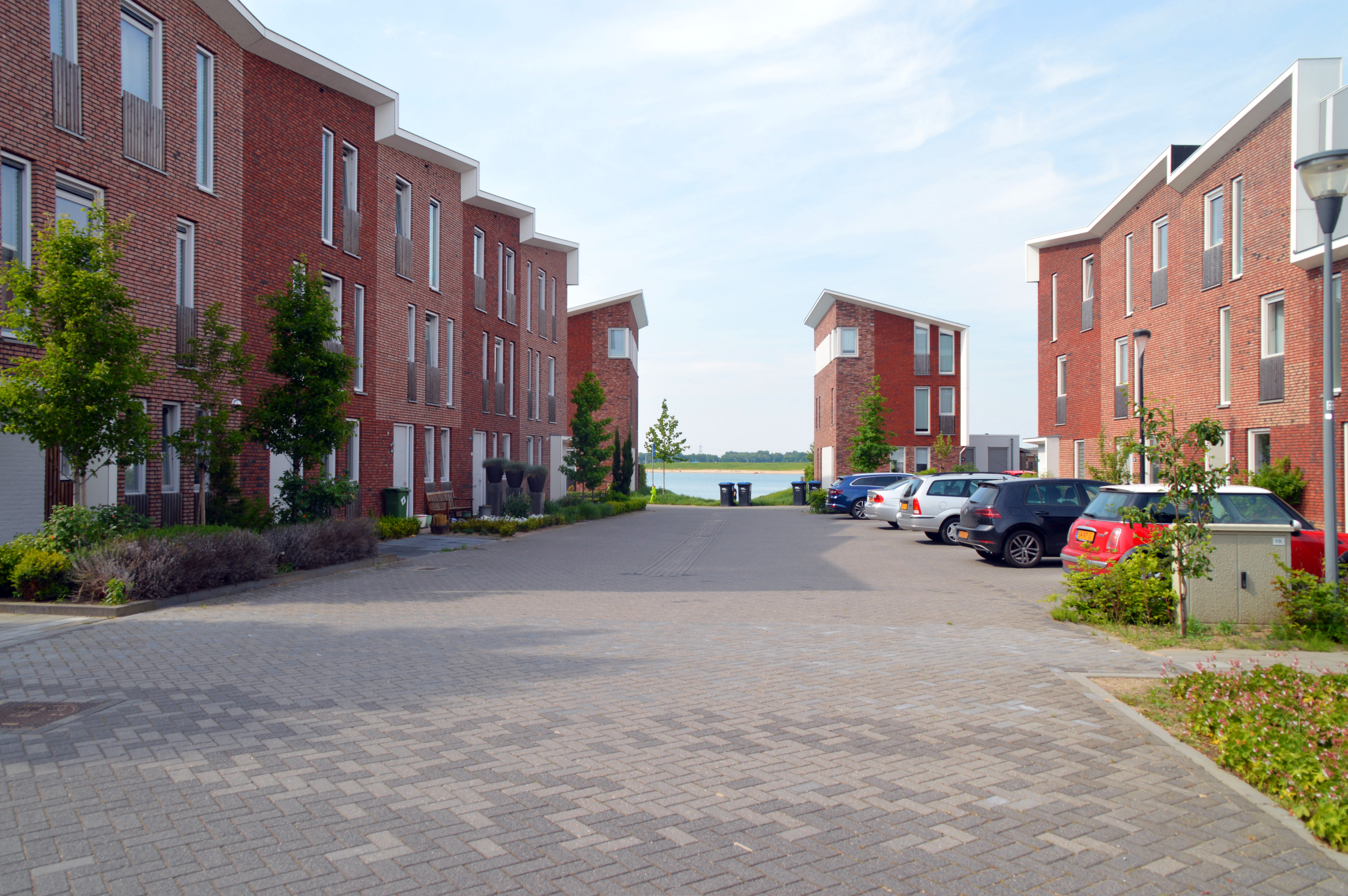
New neighbourhood
