= Room for the River =

Dutch government flood protection plan

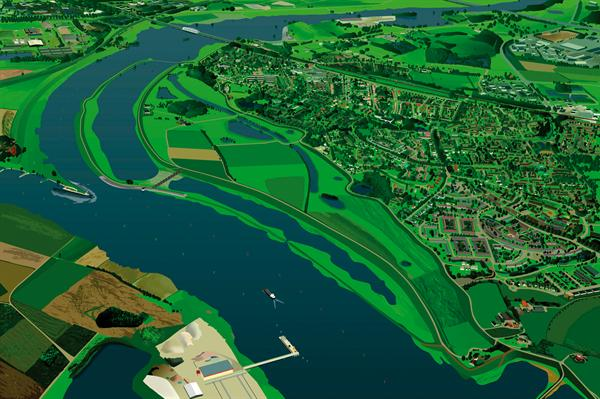

In the Netherlands, Room for the River (Dutch: Ruimte voor de Rivier) is a government design plan intended to address flood protection, master landscaping and the improvement of environmental conditions in the areas surrounding the Netherlands' rivers. The project was active from 2006 to 2015.

== Context ==
The Rhine delta experiences annual flooding. In 1993 and 1995, floods threatened to devastate regions surrounding the delta. In the neighbouring vicinity over 200,000 people were evacuated. Contrary to popular belief no dikes broke. Climate change is ongoing, and as the river floods each year the water distributes sediments throughout the floodplain which in turn reduces the space that was initially allowed for annual floods.

In 2006 the Cabinet of the Netherlands proposed the Spatial Planning Key Decision (SPKD). The SPKD is a design plan for more highly innovated structures and the modification of existing structures in the immediate floodplain site. Meander Consultancy and Research Partners contributed to the site analysis and interpretation. The project was active from 2006 to 2015.

The Room for the River project site encompasses four rivers: the Rhine, the Meuse, the Waal, and the IJssel. The project area is in the Netherlands, but morphological impacts extend upstream into Germany, portions of France and Belgium, and may reach to the Rhine headwaters in Switzerland over time.

The design presents an integrated spatial plan with the main objectives of flood protection, master landscaping and the improvement of overall environmental conditions. Completion of a basic package of forty projects is foreseen for 2015, with a budget of €2.2 billion.

== Measures ==
Measures in the plan include: placing and moving dykes, depoldering, creating and increasing the depth of flood channels, reducing the height of the groynes, removing obstacles, and the construction of a "Green River" which would serve as a flood bypass. This will result in lower flood levels. By 2015 the Rhine branches will safely cope with an outlet capacity of 16,000 cubic metres of water per second; the measures implemented to achieve this will also improve the quality of the environment of the river basin.

- Relocation of dykes – Dykes will be relocated farther from the river shore. This will create additional space within the flood plain for the river during annual floods.
- Lower the level of floodplain – In addition to the relocation of the dykes, the floodplain bottom will be lowered in depth. Increasing the depth in the floodplain must occur due to the collection of sediments in the area after years of regular flooding.
- Reduce height of the groynes – The groynes within the riverbed will be lowered to allow for more drainage to occur during an increase in water levels more quickly than presently positioned. Groynes will be added in specified locations in addition to the modifications occurring to the existing structures.
- Construction of a “Green Channel” – A “Green Channel” will be constructed serving as a flood bypass around Veessen-Wapenveld.
- Increase the depth of the side channels – Side channels will be lowered in depth to increase the barrier between the river and infrastructures and residents. It will also allow for more water to be removed from the flooded location thus reducing the breach of the dykes.
- Removal of obstacles – Locations along the river where there are obstacles will be addressed. For example, the hydraulic bridge at Oosterbeek will be removed. Removing or modifying obstacles in the river wherever possible helps increase the flow rate for the river water.

== See also ==
- Flood control in the Netherlands
- Floods in the Netherlands
