= List of flooded villages in Zeeland =

This is a list of flooded villages in Zeeland, a province of the Netherlands.

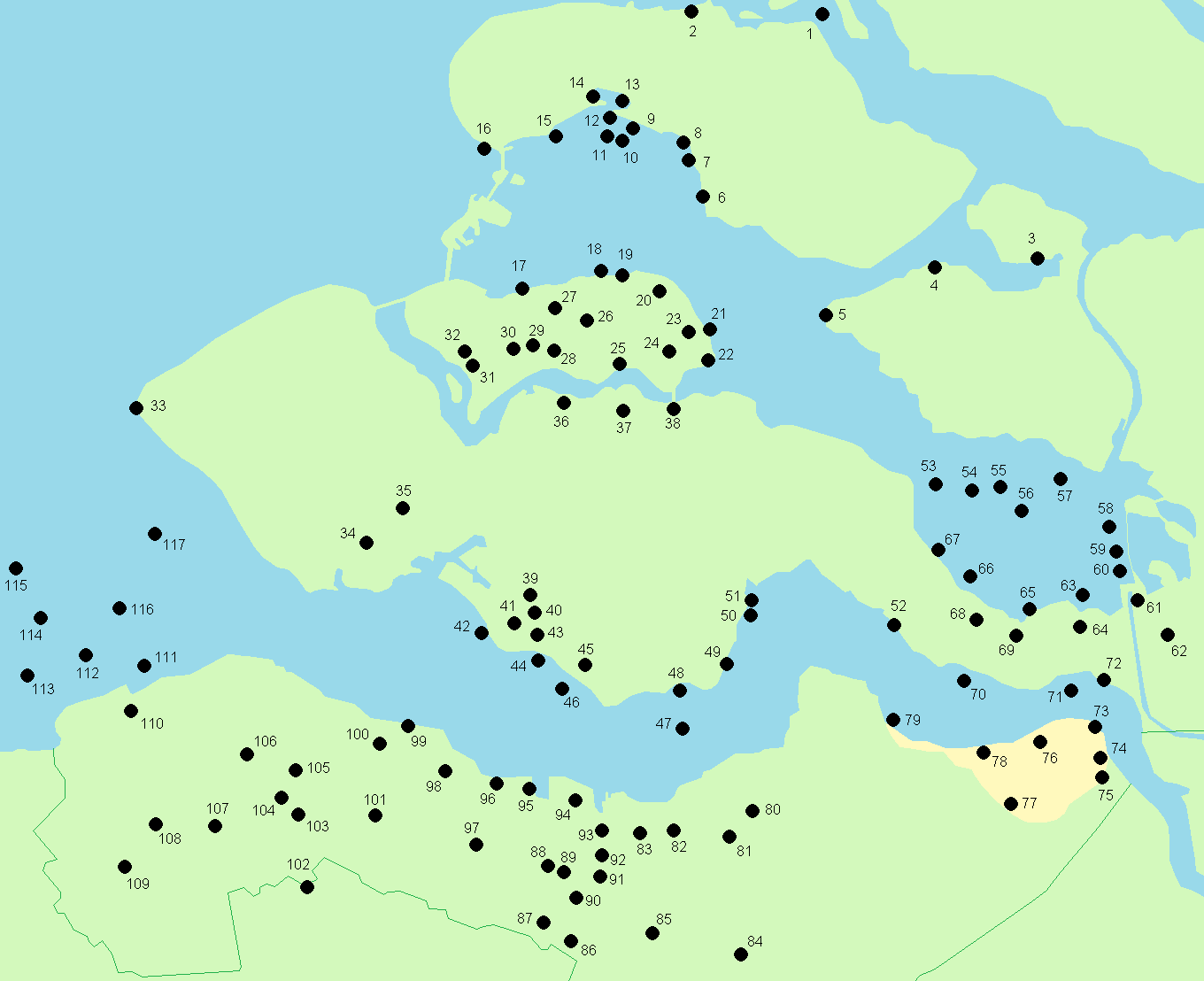

N°	Name	Year
1	Bommenee (Bommenede)	1682 (abandoned in 1684)
2	Claeskynderkerke (Klaaskinderkerke)	1570
3	Sint-Philipsland	1532
4	Moggershil	1570
5	Stevenesse ('Oud'-Stavenisse)	1509
6	Borrendamme	1642
7	Simonskerke	1534
8	Rengerskerke	1662
9	Sint-Jacobskerke	c. 1500
10	Oudekerke	c. 1500
11	Westkerke	Before 1500
12	Brieskerke	1542
13	Zuidkerke	1542
14	Coudekerke (Koudekerke)	1550-1600
15	Clauskinderen (Claeskerke, Oostkerke)	1511
16	Westenschouwen	16th century
17	Weele	1530
18	Soecke (Hoeke, Houcke, Dijxhoeke, 's-Gravenhoecke)	1530
19	Dekenskapelle (Noordwelle)	1463
20	Welle	1530
21	Oud-Hamerstede	1304
22	'Oud'-Kats (Subburchdijc)	1530
23	Emelisse	1530-1532
24	Nieuw-Hamerstede (Edekinge?)	1530
25	'Oud'-Kortgene	1530-1532
26	Offliet (Ghrutersdijc?)	c. 1460
27	Schoonboom	1421?
28	'Oud'-Geersdijk	1530-1532
29	'Oud'-Wissenkerke	1530-1532
30	'Oud'-Wissenkerke	1352?
31	Soelekerke (Soetelinkskerke)	1530-1532
32	Campen	1530-1532
33	'Oud'-Westkapelle	
34	Welzinge	
35	'Oud'-Arnemuiden	1440-1460
36	Westkerke	1377
37	Oostkerke	1334
38	Hongersdijk	1334, 1551
39	Tewijk	1530-1532
40	Sint-Katherijnekerke	1530-1532
41	Monster	1530-1532
42	Westkerke (Raaskerke)	1530-1532
43	Oostkerke	1530-1532
44	Wolfertsdorp	1530
45	Coudorpe	
46	Oud-Everinge	2nd half of 15th century
47	Stuivezand	17th century (early)
48	Nieuw-Everinge	1530
49	Bakendorp	1530-1570
50	Vinninghen (Vinningen)	1521
51	Oostende	1520-1521
52	Nieuwkapelle	17th century
53	Kouwerve	1530-1532
54	Duvenee	1530-1532
55	Lodijke	1530-1532
56	Nieuwkerke	1530-1532
57	Reimerswaal	1631
58	Assemansbroek (Broecke)	1530
59	Kreke	1530/1532
60	Steelvliet (Steenvliet)	1530-1532
61	Hinkelenoord	1552
62	Agger	1552
63	Everswaard	1530
64	Ouderdinge	1530-1532
65	Schoudee	1530-1532
66	Nieuwlande	1530-1532
67	Tolsende	1530-1532
68	'Oud'-Krabbendijke	1530
69	Mare	1530
70	Valkenisse	1682
71	'Oud'-Rilland	1530
72	'Oud'-Bath	1552
73	Saeftinghe	1175 military inundation, 1584 inundation
74	Stampaert	1584
75	Casuwele ou Casuele	1584
76	Weele (Sint-Marie)	
77	Sint-Laureijns	c. 1580
78	Namen	1715/1717
79	'Oud'-Hontenisse	1508, 1509, 1511
80	Aendijcke	1584
81	Saemslach/Genderdijk (Zaamslag)	1584
82	'Oud'-Othene (Noten)	1586
83	Triniteit	1584/1585
84	Beoostenbly	
85	Peerboom	1488 military, 1493 tempest
86	Sint-Janscapelle	
87	Moerkerke	15th century (end), 16th century (early)
88	Koudekerke	1375
89	Hertinghe	1488
90	Niekerke	1393, 1488
91	Steelant	1488
92	Hughersluis	1492
93	Willemskerke	1488 military inundation, 1586 inundation
94	Vreemdijke (Vroondijk)	1488 tempest and inundation, 1601 tempest
95	Pakinghe (Sint-Laureinskerke)	1214 and 14th century
96	Wevelswaele	1375/1376, 1404
97	De Piet (Ter Piete, Pieta, Pieten)	1375
98	Boterzande	1375/1376
99	Hughevliet	1404
100	Gaternisse	1570
101	'Oud'-IJzendijke	1437
102	Sint-Nicolaas in Varne	1377
103	Elmare	1375
104	Oostmanskerke	1404
105	Schoondijke	1583/1585
106	Nieuwerkerke	1570 military inundation, 1584 inundation
107	Sint-Catharina (Sint-Cathelijne)	1375/1376 and 1583
108	Coxie (Coxyde)	1477, 1583
109	Hannekenswerve	1660
110	Nieuwvliet	16th century
111	Oostende	c. 1516
112	Sint-Lambert-Wulpen	1516
113	Westende	c. 1516
114	Reimersdorpe (Remboudsdorpe)	c. 1516
115	Waterdunen	c. 1516
116	Avenkerke	c. 1516
117	Schooneveld	1375

== See also ==
- List of settlements lost to floods in the Netherlands

== References and notes ==
- Extensive information can be found in the book:
  - Kuipers, Jan J.B. (2004). Sluimerend in slik. Verdronken dorpen en verdronken land in zuidwest Nederland (in Dutch). Middelburg/Vlissingen: Den Boer/Der Ruiter.
