= Nieuw-Strijen =

Coordinates: 51°31′27″N 4°09′19″E

Nieuw-Strijen is a polder and a former municipality in the Dutch province of Zeeland, located on the island of Tholen. The small village "Nieuw-Strijen" is now called Strijenham.

Nieuw-Strijen was a separate municipality until 1813, when it was merged with Poortvliet.
