= Westkerke, Netherlands =

Westkerke
- Hamlet
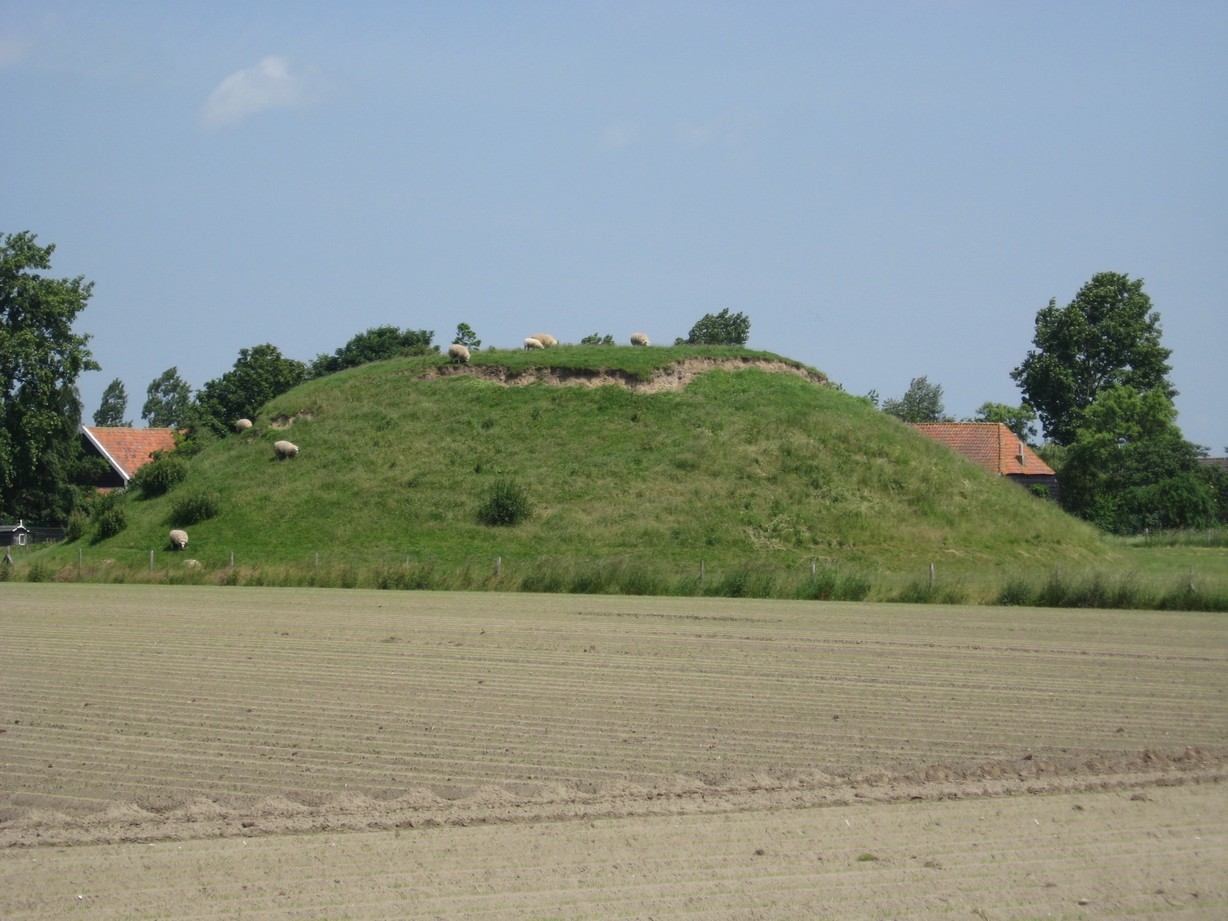
- Artificial flee mountain

- Flag Coat of arms

- Location in the province of Zeeland in the Netherlands Westkerke (Netherlands)
- Coordinates: 51°32′11″N 4°5′39″E
- Country: Netherlands
- Province: Zeeland
- Municipality: Tholen
- Time zone: UTC+1 (CET)
  - Summer (DST): UTC+2 (CEST)
- Postal code: 4694
- Dialing code: 0166

Westkerke is a hamlet in the south-west Netherlands. It is located in the municipality of Tholen, Zeeland, about 1 km southwest of Scherpenisse.

Westkerke is not a statistical entity, and the postal authorities have placed it under Scherpenisse. It consists of about 15 houses.

Westkerke has an artificial vlietberg (flee mountain), an artificial mound built between the 10th and 13th century which could contain a motte-and-bailey castle.

Westkerke was a separate municipality until 1816, when it was merged with Scherpenisse. Westkerke was home to 227 people in 1840. Scherpenisse merged in 1971 into Tholen.
