= Sint Philipsland (island) =

Former island in the Dutch province of Zeeland

Coordinates: 51.6283°N 4.1303°E

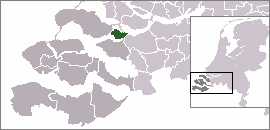
Sint Philipsland

Sint Philipsland is a former island in the Dutch province of Zeeland. Nowadays it is part of the municipality of Tholen.

It contains the villages of Sint Philipsland and Anna Jacobapolder, and also the hamlet of De Sluis.
