= Maire, Netherlands =

Coordinates: 51.4208°N 4.15833°E

Maire (also Meere or Mare) is a former village in the Dutch province of Zeeland. It was located northwest of the village of Rilland.

The church of Maire was mentioned in 1284. The village suffered from a number of floods, and on 5 November 1530, it drowned completely. When it was flooded again on 2 November 1532, it was abandoned completely. A small part of the area was reclaimed from the sea in 1694, but the village was never rebuilt.

Maire was a separate municipality until 1816, when it was merged with Rilland.

== See also ==
- List of flooded villages in Zeeland
