= Poortvliet =

- Village
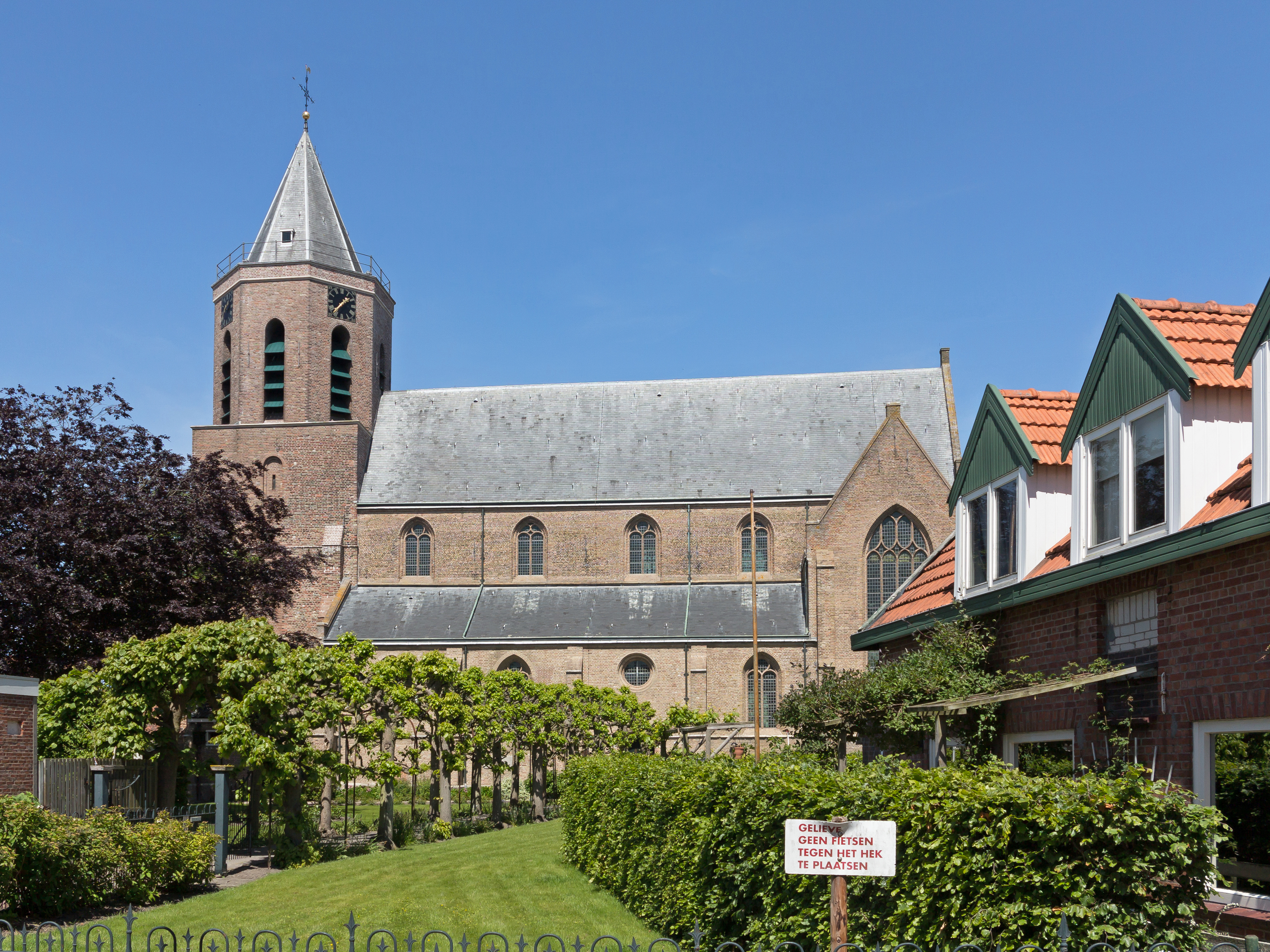
- The St Pancratius Church

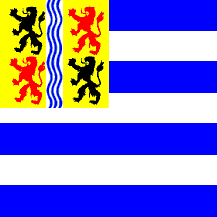
- Flag Coat of arms

- Location in the province of Zeeland in the Netherlands Poortvliet (Netherlands)
- Coordinates: 51°32′40″N 4°8′39″E
- Country: Netherlands
- Province: Zeeland
- Municipality: Tholen

Area
  - Total: 22.18 km^{2} (8.56 sq mi)
- Elevation: −0.5 m (−1.6 ft)

Population (2021)
  - Total: 1,715
  - Density: 77.32/km^{2} (200.3/sq mi)
- Time zone: UTC+1 (CET)
  - Summer (DST): UTC+2 (CEST)
- Postal code: 4693
- Dialing code: 0166

Poortvliet (Dutch pronunciation: [ˈpoːrtflit]; Zeelandic: Poôfliet) is a village in the Dutch province of Zeeland. It is a part of the municipality of Tholen and lies about 12 km northwest of Bergen op Zoom.

== History ==
The village was first mentioned in 1200 as Portfliet, and the name is a combination of words for port and streaming water. Poortvliet is a circular church village. The Poortvlietpolder and the Mallandpolder are the oldest diked polders of the former island of Tholen.

The Dutch Reformed church is a basilica like cruciform church which was dedicated to St Pancratius. The lower parts of the tower date from around 1350. The church was rebuilt after a fire in 1586. During a restoration in 1778, the entire choir was removed.

The grist mill De Korenaar was built in 1710. The wind mill started to lean during construction and is smaller than intended. In 2010s, the displacement was 66 centimeters. In 1950, an electro motor was installed. In 2010, it was restored and back in service until 2018.

Poortvliet was home to 1,113 people in 1840. Poortvliet was evacuated and inundated in 1944. In 1945, it was hit by V-1 flying bomb intended for Antwerp which killed four people. Poortvliet was severely affected by the North Sea flood of 1953.

In 1813, the village of Nieuw-Strijen was merged with Poortvliet. Poortvliet remained a separate municipality until 1971, when it was merged with Tholen.

== Gallery ==
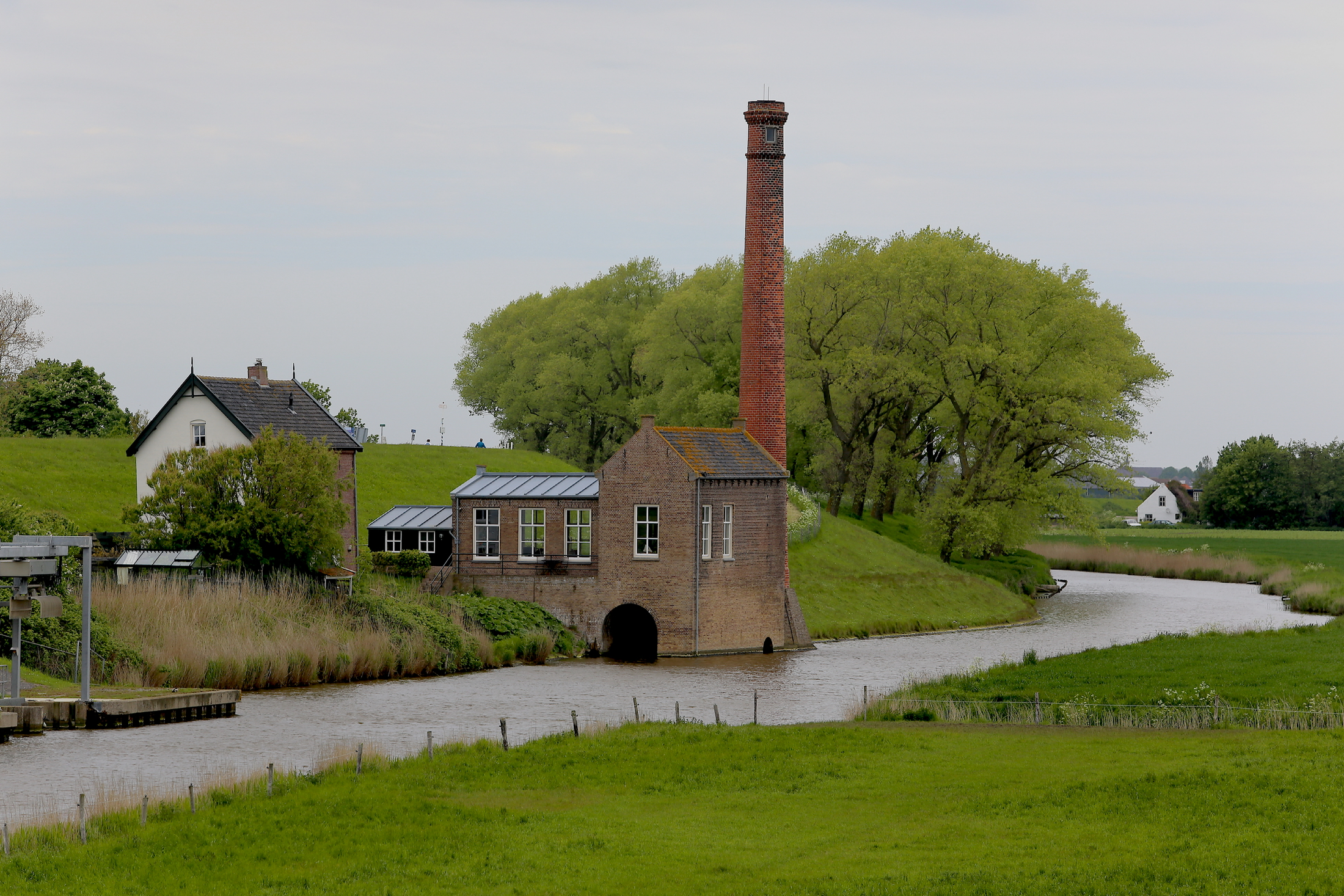
Steam pumping station Oosterschelde

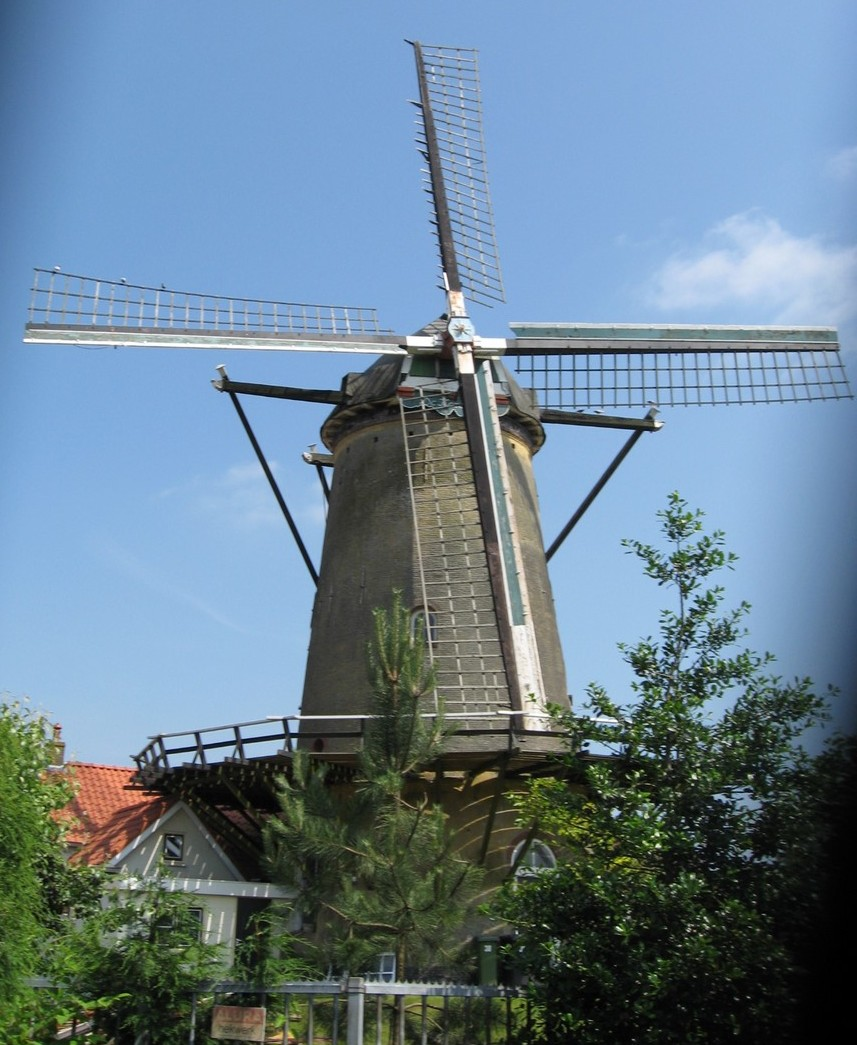
Wind mill De Korenaar

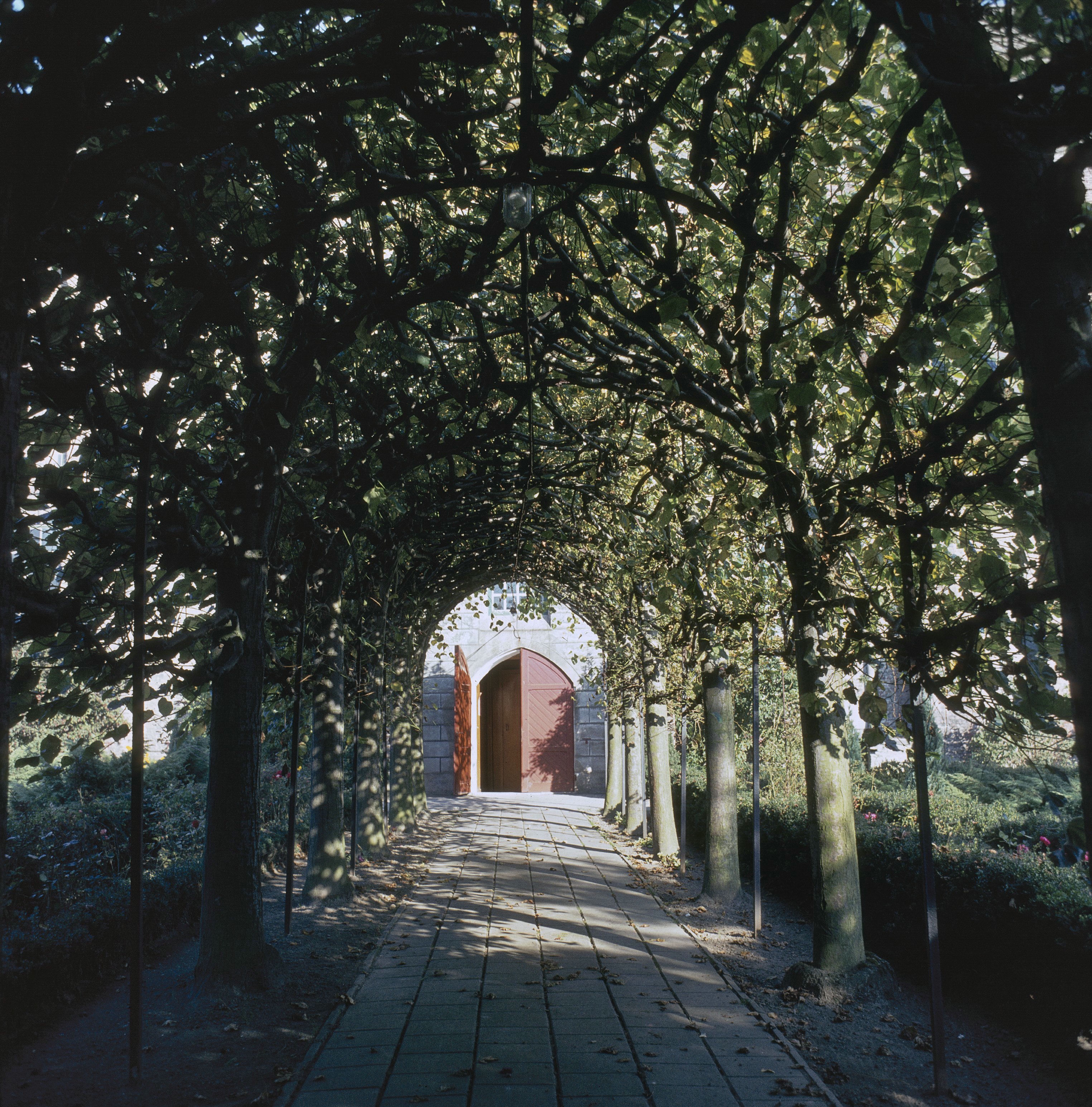
Entrance to the church

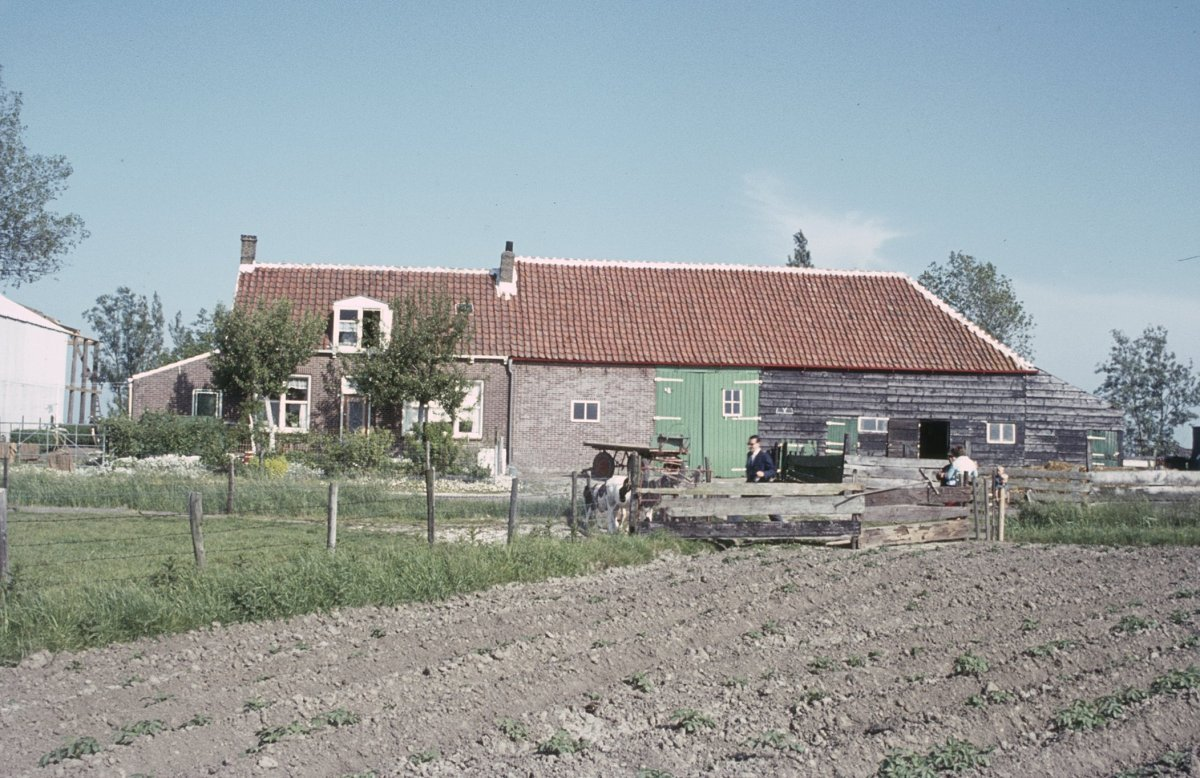
Farm in Poortvliet
