= Anna Jacobapolder =

- Village
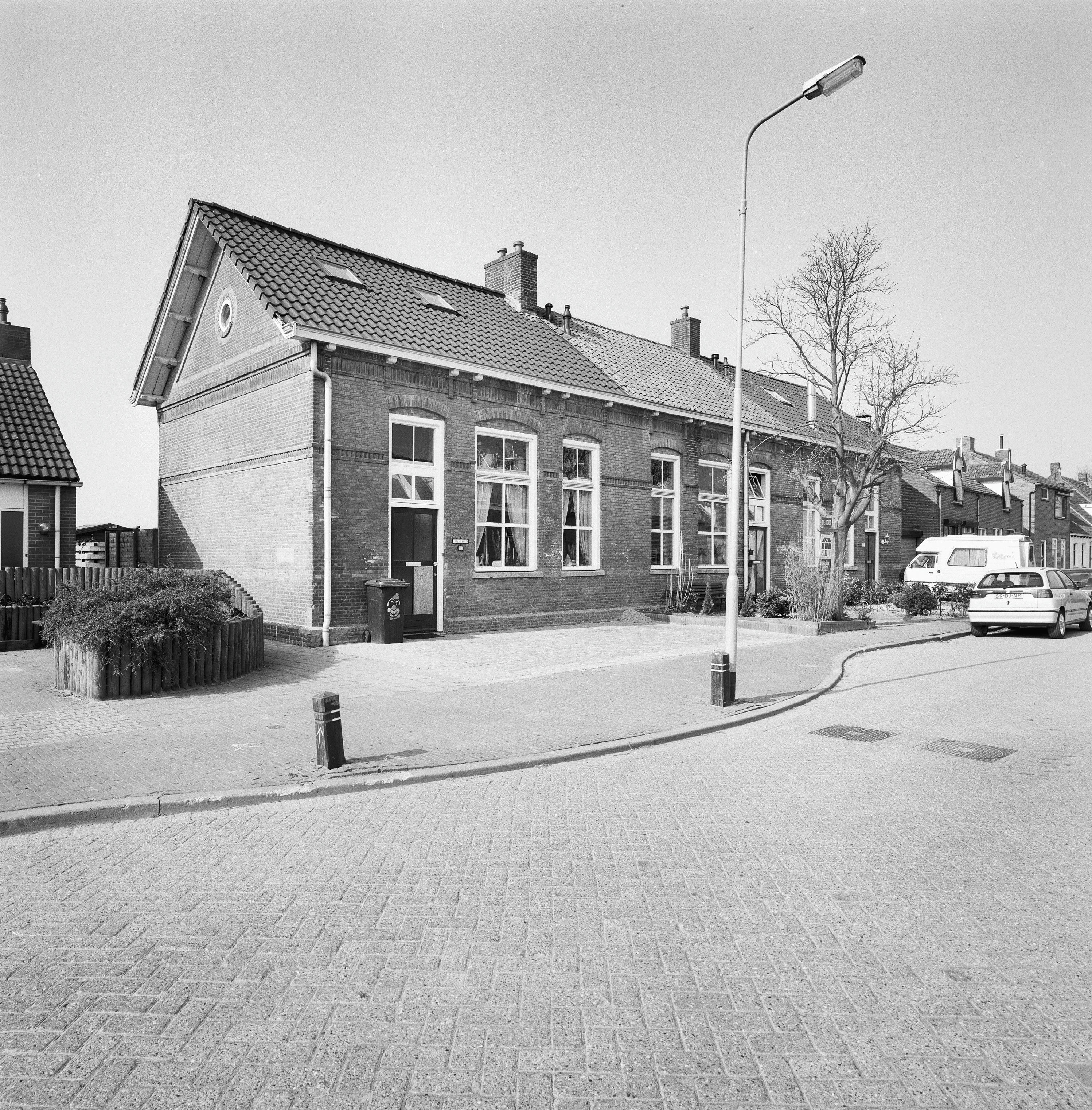
- Houses in Anna Jacobapolder

- Location in the province of Zeeland in the Netherlands Anna Jacobapolder (Netherlands)
- Coordinates: 51°38′18″N 4°7′44″E
- Country: Netherlands
- Province: Zeeland
- Municipality: Tholen

Area
  - Total: 0.07 km^{2} (0.027 sq mi)
- Elevation: 0.7 m (2.3 ft)

Population (2021)
  - Total: 230
  - Density: 3,300/km^{2} (8,500/sq mi)
- Time zone: UTC+1 (CET)
  - Summer (DST): UTC+2 (CEST)
- Postal code: 4675
- Dialing code: 0167

Anna Jacobapolder (Dutch pronunciation: [ˈɑnaː jaːˈkoːbaːˌpɔldər]) is a village in the Dutch province of Zeeland. It is a part of the municipality of Tholen, and lies about 20 km north west of Bergen op Zoom.

== History ==
The village was first mentioned between 1838 and 1857 as AandenNoordweg. It was later renamed after its eponymous polder which received its name from Anna Jacoba van Sonsbeeck (1808-1871), the wife of the engineer in charge of the poldering. It was originally an island and separated from Sint Philipsland by the Bruintjeskreek. In 1867, it became part of Sint Philipsland, and in 1884, it was connected to the main land.

The Reformed Church was built in 1895. After the inundation of 1944 and North Sea flood of 1953, it was in a poor state. A new aisleless church was built in 1959. The tower of old church was demolished in 1965, and the church was converted into a residential home.

Anna Jacobapolder used to have a water tower. On 5 November 1944, the village was liberated, and the tower was used as an observation post to the German stronghold at Schouwen-Duiveland. On the night of 22 to 23 January 1945, 50 German fallschirmjäger sneaked into the area. During a battle at the farm Hof Rumoirt, three Polish, two English and one Dutch soldier were killed and the water tower was blown up. There used to be a ferry from Anna Jacobapolder to Zijpe. In 1988, the Philipsdam was completed and the ferry was disestablished.
