= Sluis, Tholen =

De Sluis Sluis
- Hamlet
- Interactive map of De Sluis
- Coordinates: 51.64099°N 4.10670°E
- Country: Netherlands
- Province: Zeeland
- Municipality: Tholen
- Time zone: UTC+1 (CET)
  - Summer (DST): UTC+2 (CEST)
- Postal code: 4675
- Dialing code: 0167

De Sluis or Sluis is a hamlet in the Dutch province of Zeeland. It is a part of the municipality of Tholen, and lies about 21 km north-west of Bergen op Zoom.

De Sluis is not a statistical entity, and the postal authorities have placed it under Sint Philipsland. It has place name signs and consists of about 10 houses.

The village was named after the nearby sluice, and was established after 1900 to house the employees of the Rotterdamsche Tramweg Maatschappij. A tram line was built to Brouwershaven and was mainly used for the transportation of sugar beet. The tram line closed in 1953.

The ferry from Anna Jacobapolder to Zijpe used to be located in De Sluis. In 1988, the Philipsdam was completed and the ferry was disestablished.
