= Ghiselin Danckerts =

Dutch composer, singer and music theorist

Ghiselin Danckerts (c. 1510 – late September 1567) was a Dutch composer, singer, and music theorist of the Renaissance. He was principally active in Rome, in the service of the Papal Chapel, and was one of the judges at the famous debate between Nicola Vicentino and Vicente Lusitano in 1551.

== Life ==
He was born in Tholen, in Zeeland, but nothing is known of his early life. Like many of his contemporaries from the Low Countries, he may have received his early training in his homeland, going to Italy as a young adult. In his manuscript treatise Sopra una differentia musicale sententiata he asserts that he was employed by Pierluigi Carafa, member of an aristocratic family in Naples. He was admitted as a singer at the Papal Chapel 21 March 1538, a position he retained, seemingly without break, until 1565. In August 1565 he was forced to retire from the papal chapel as part of a reorganization and reduction in size which followed from the reforms of the Council of Trent. The entry in the chapel records for his dismissal includes the notice: "he is without voice, he is given to women, is excessively rich, and is useless because of illness." He was granted a monthly pension of six ducats and remains in the lists among the "second class" singers from October 1565 - November 1567.

== Music, writings, and influence ==
A few works of Danckerts have survived, but no complete publications. One motet which survives in manuscript is an eight-voice setting of Laetamini in domino; two other motets, for six and five voices, Suscipe verbum and Tu es vas electionis, were destroyed in the Allied bombing of Treviso on April 7, 1944, during World War II. Other surviving works include several madrigals and puzzle canons, two of which are included in Pietro Cerone's El Melopeo y maestro (Naples, 1613). An autograph manuscript source containing sacred music, like as a Salve Regina, a Magnificat, a Mass (Missa de Beata Virgine), some hymns and motets, probably composed by Danckerts, has recently come to light.

While relatively little of Danckerts' music has survived, his contemporary reputation as a composer and theorist was strong enough for him to be selected as one of the judges at the renowned Vicentino-Lusitano debate, and it is for his participation in this, and his subsequent writings on it and related topics, that he is best known. The judges, including Danckerts, ruled Lusitano the winner. As a result of the debate, Vicentino published his famous treatise L'antica musica ridotta alla moderna prattica (1555), and Danckerts replied with his treatise Sopra una differentia musica sententiata, which however remained unpublished.

The treatise by Danckerts exists in three versions. The first was probably written in 1551, and Danckerts seems to have revised it twice: once around 1555 and once around 1559 or 1560. Its importance to music history is as a document by a performing musician, with strong conservative views, who documented contemporary practice in some areas – for example in interpretation of accidentals – where documentation is relatively scanty. One of the chapters in his treatise contains an account of a dispute between two singers in the papal choir over the correct application of accidentals to polyphonic parts which, as was normal at the time, contained none. Danckerts also wrote on the use of chromaticism, generally derisively, and opposed attempts to add modes to the current eight-mode system, for example as described by Glareanus in his 1547 publication, the Dodecachordon, which proposed the twelve modes, including the major and minor scales familiar in the present day.

Artusi used portions of Danckerts' treatise in his reactionary 1600 publication Imperfettioni della musica moderna, which he wrote as an attack on Monteverdi.

== Notes ==
1. Gustave Reese, Music in the Renaissance, p. 364.

== References and further reading ==
- Lewis Lockwood: "Ghiselin Danckerts", Grove Music Online, ed. L. Macy (Accessed May 6, 2006), (subscription access)
- Gustave Reese, Music in the Renaissance. New York, W.W. Norton & Co., 1954. ISBN 0-393-09530-4
- Arnaldo Morelli, "Una nuova fonte per la musica di Ghiselino Danckerts 'musico e cantore cappellano della cappella del papa'", Recercare, xxi (2009), pp. 75-110 (English version: "A new source for the music of Ghiselin Danckerts, ‘musico e cantore cappellano della cappella del papa’", Tijdschrift van de Koninklijke Vereniging voor Nederlandse Muziekgeschiedenis, lxvi/1-2 (2014), pp. 47–75.
- Eric Jas, ed.: Ghiselin Danckerts: The vocal works (Exempla Musica Zelandica, vol. V). Middelburg 2001. ISBN 90-70534-34-7
