= Scherpenisse =

- Village
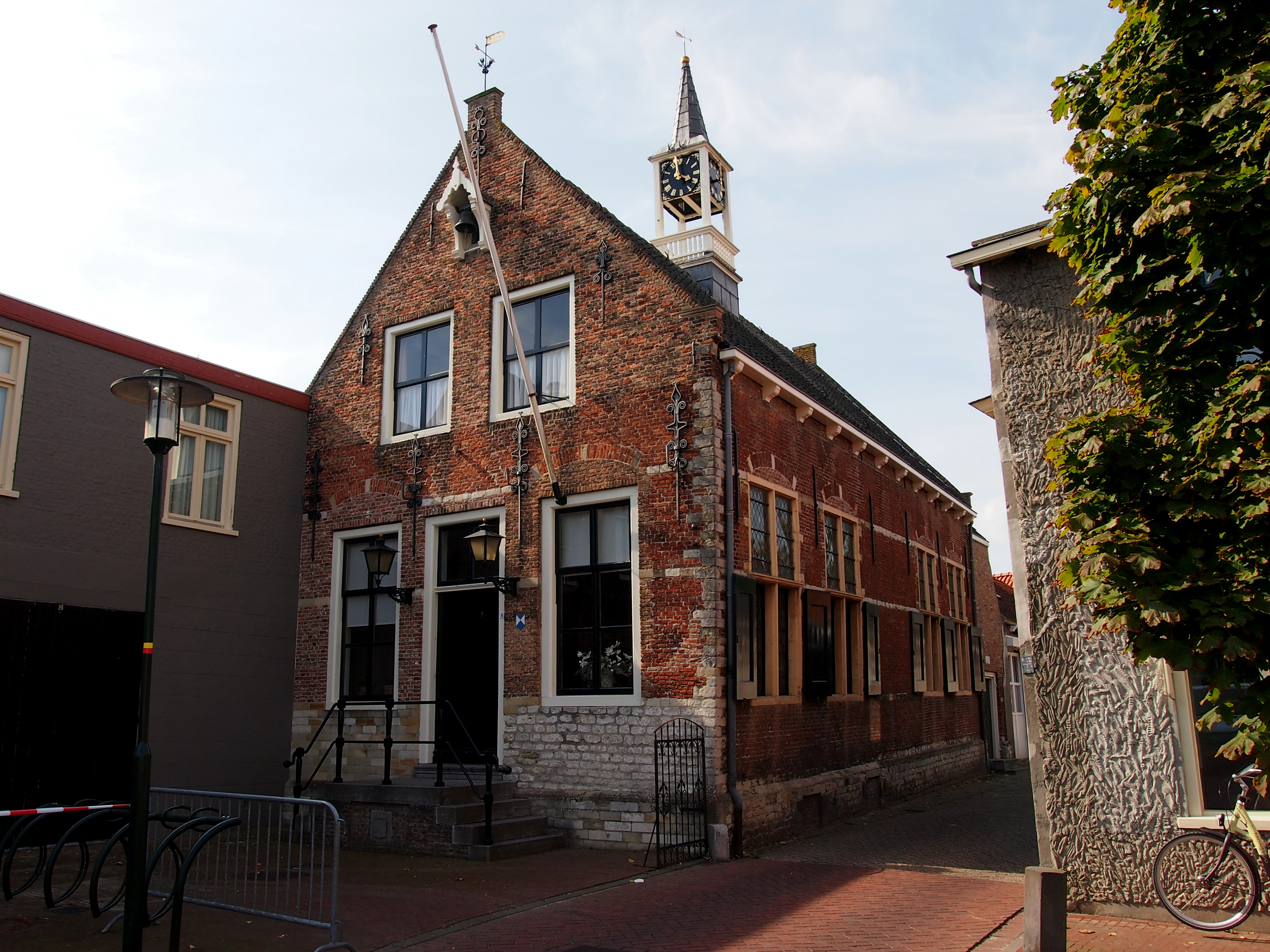
- Former town hall

- Flag Coat of arms

- Location in the province of Zeeland in the Netherlands Scherpenisse (Netherlands)
- Coordinates: 51°32′48″N 4°6′18″E
- Country: Netherlands
- Province: Zeeland
- Municipality: Tholen

Area
  - Total: 21.34 km^{2} (8.24 sq mi)
- Elevation: 2.9 m (9.5 ft)

Population (2021)
  - Total: 1,550
  - Density: 72.6/km^{2} (188/sq mi)
- Time zone: UTC+1 (CET)
  - Summer (DST): UTC+2 (CEST)
- Postal code: 4521
- Dialing code: 0115

Scherpenisse is a village in the Dutch province of Zeeland. It is a part of the municipality of Tholen, and lies about 14 km west of Bergen op Zoom.

== History ==
It was first mentioned in 1204 as Scarpenes, and means "sharp headland". Scherpenisse developed along the former trench Pluimpot. The area became property of the House of Orange in 1551. In 1556, the Pluimpot was dammed, and the main buildings were constructed between the dam and the church.

The Dutch Reformed is a basilica like church with a thick tower. The church probably dates from the 15th century. Construction of the tower started in 1520, but was halted in 1570. The church was restored between 1971 and 1974. The church is located off-centre, because a part of the village burnt down in 1538, and was rebuilt closer to the harbour.

The former town hall was constructed in 1594 as a gift of Countess Maria of Nassau. The building is in mannerist style and has a ridge turret with clock.

Scherpenisse was home to 935 people in 1840. Scherpenisse was a separate municipality until 1971, when it was merged with Tholen. In 1957, as part of the Delta Works, the remainder of the Pluimpot was filled up, and the harbour of Scherpenisse disappeared.

== Gallery ==
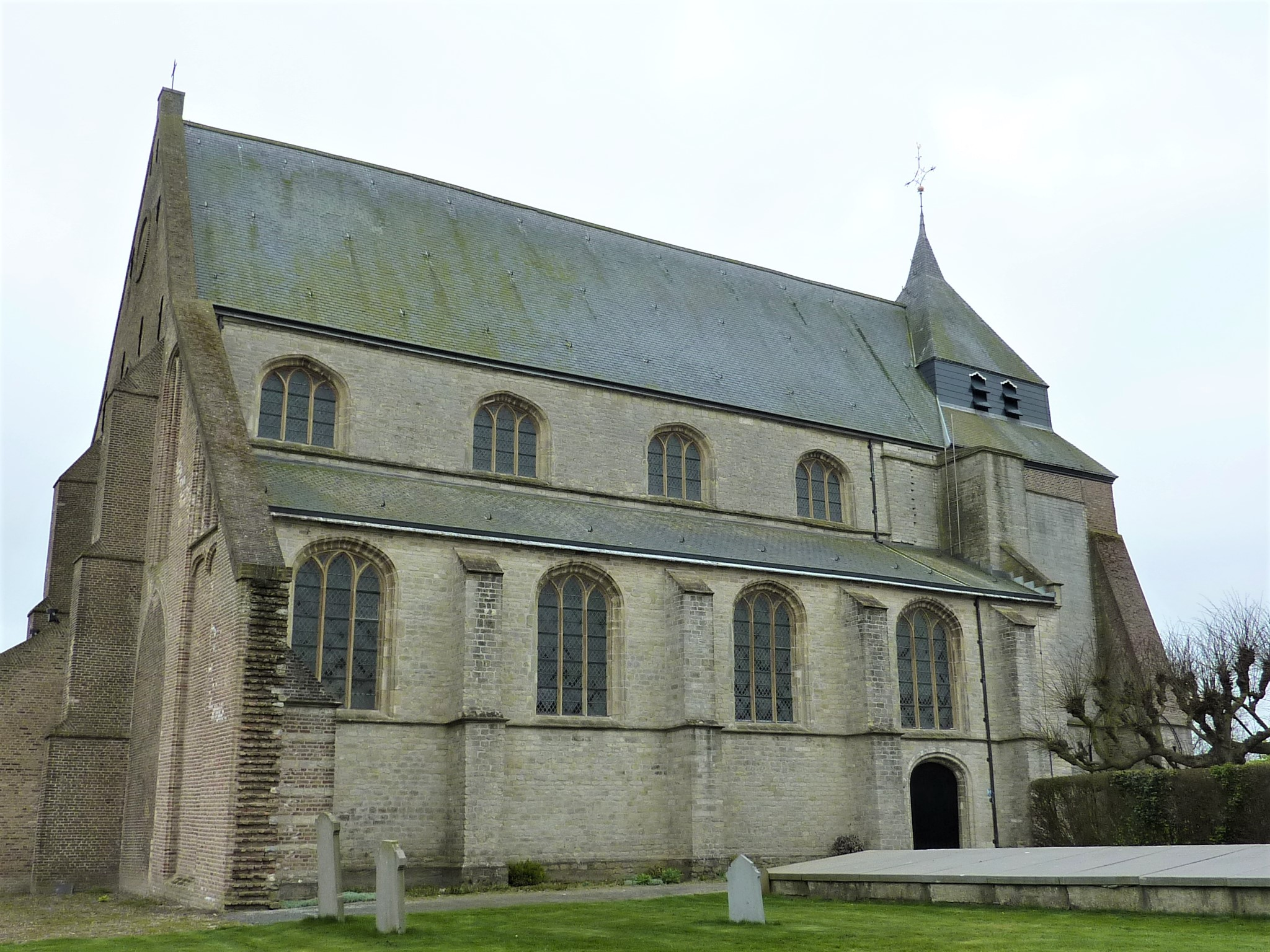
Dutch Reformed church

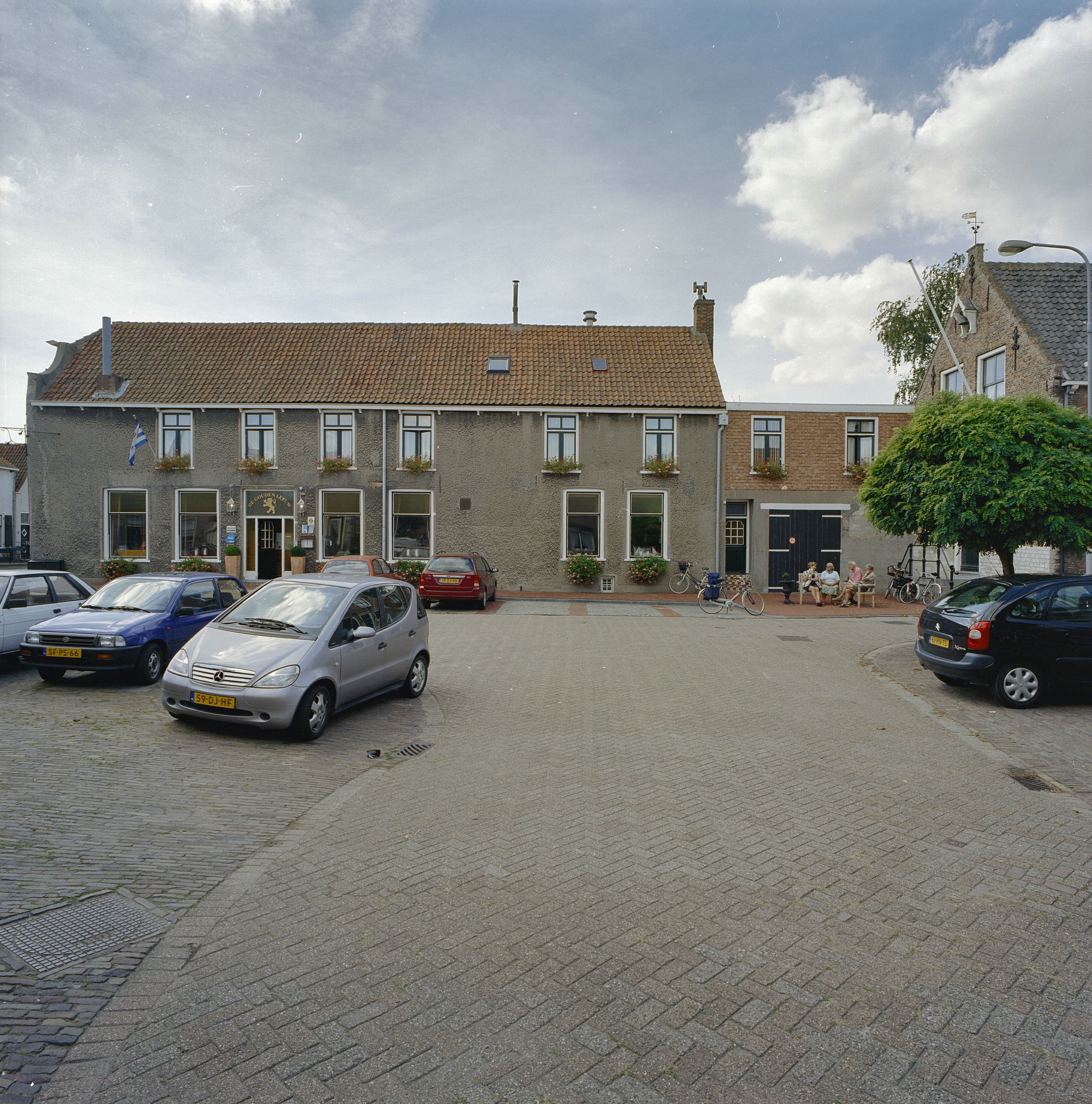
Hotel-restaurant De Gouden Leeuw

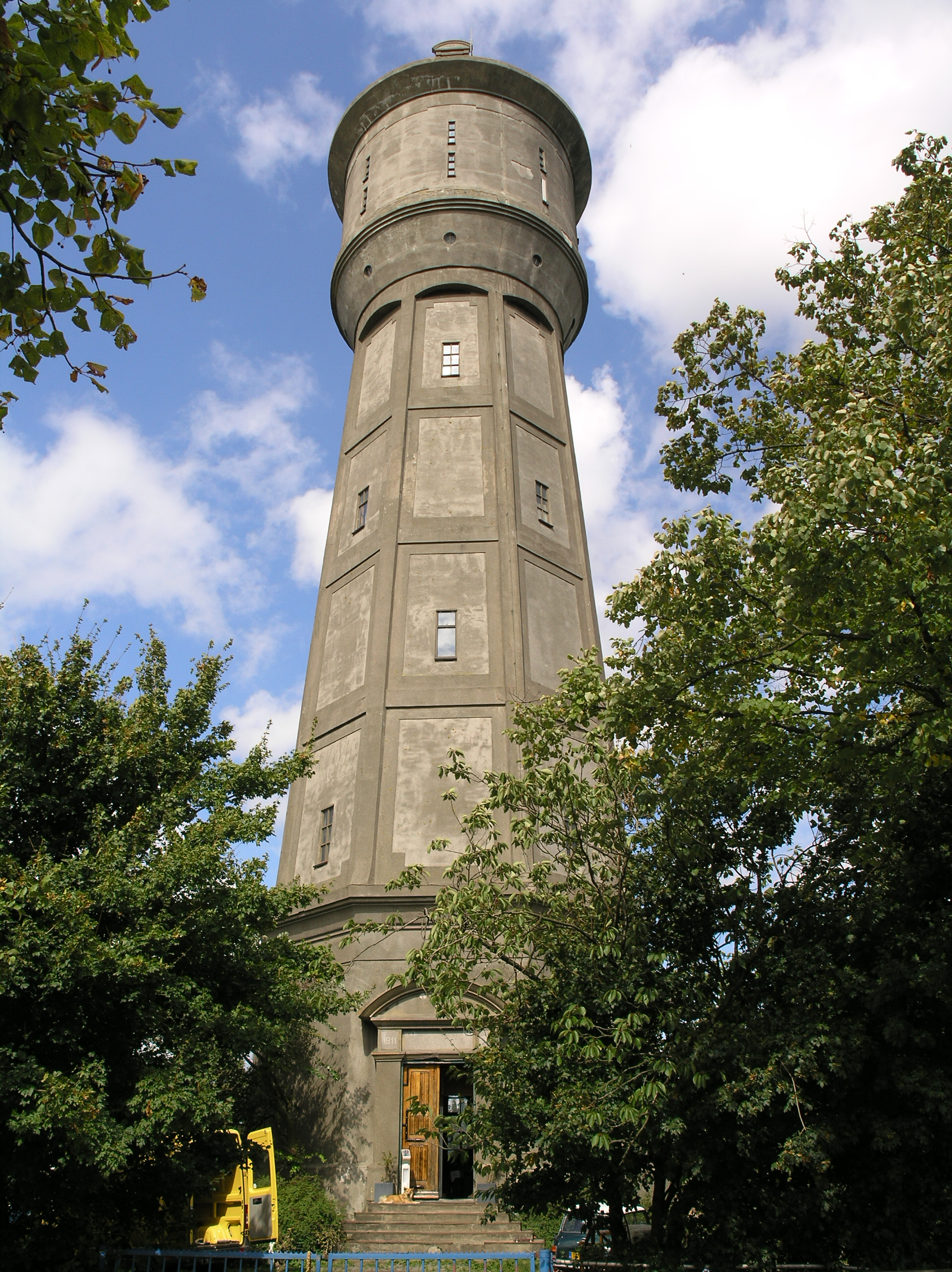
Water tower

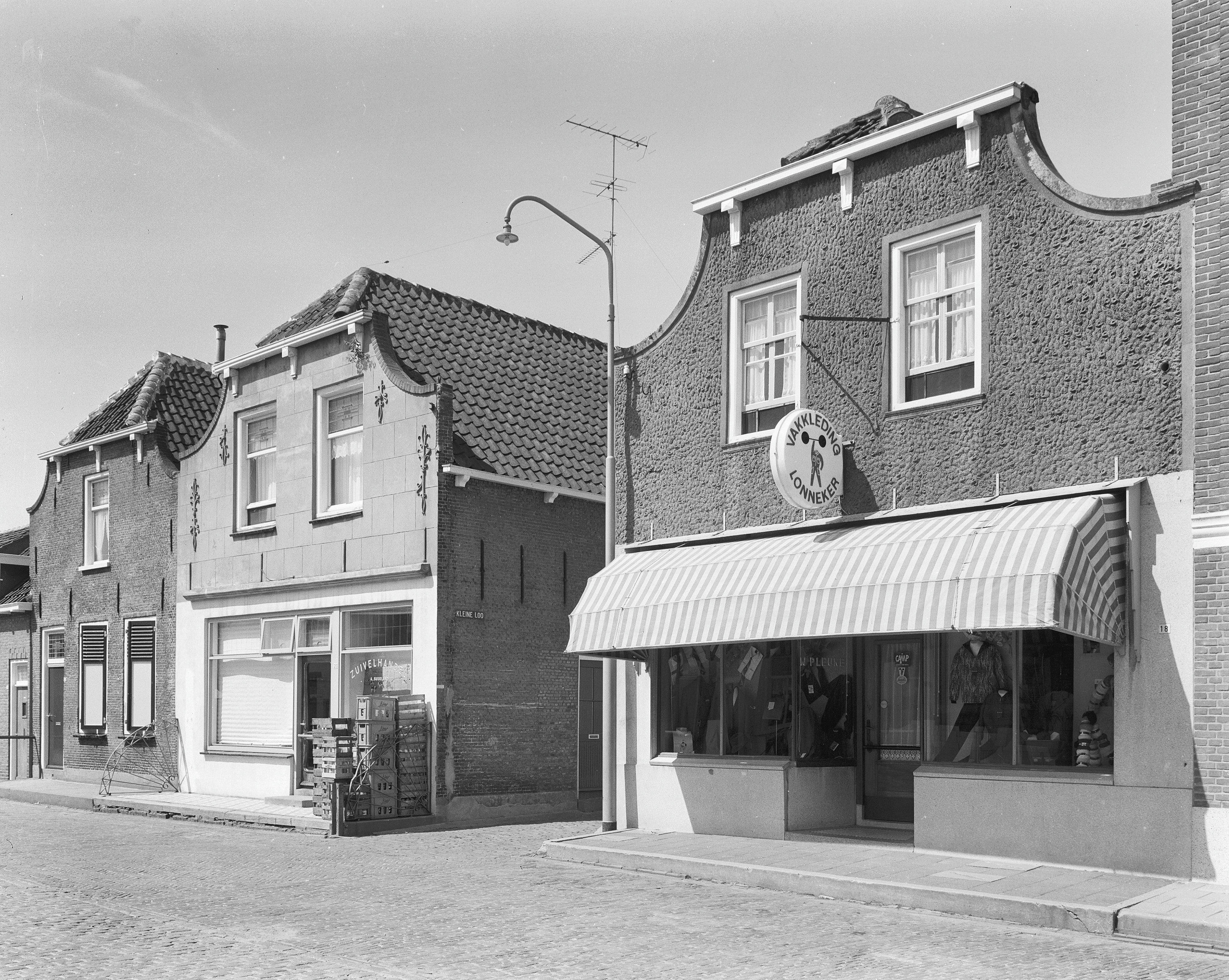
Shops in Scherpenisse
