= Sint Philipsland (village) =

- Village
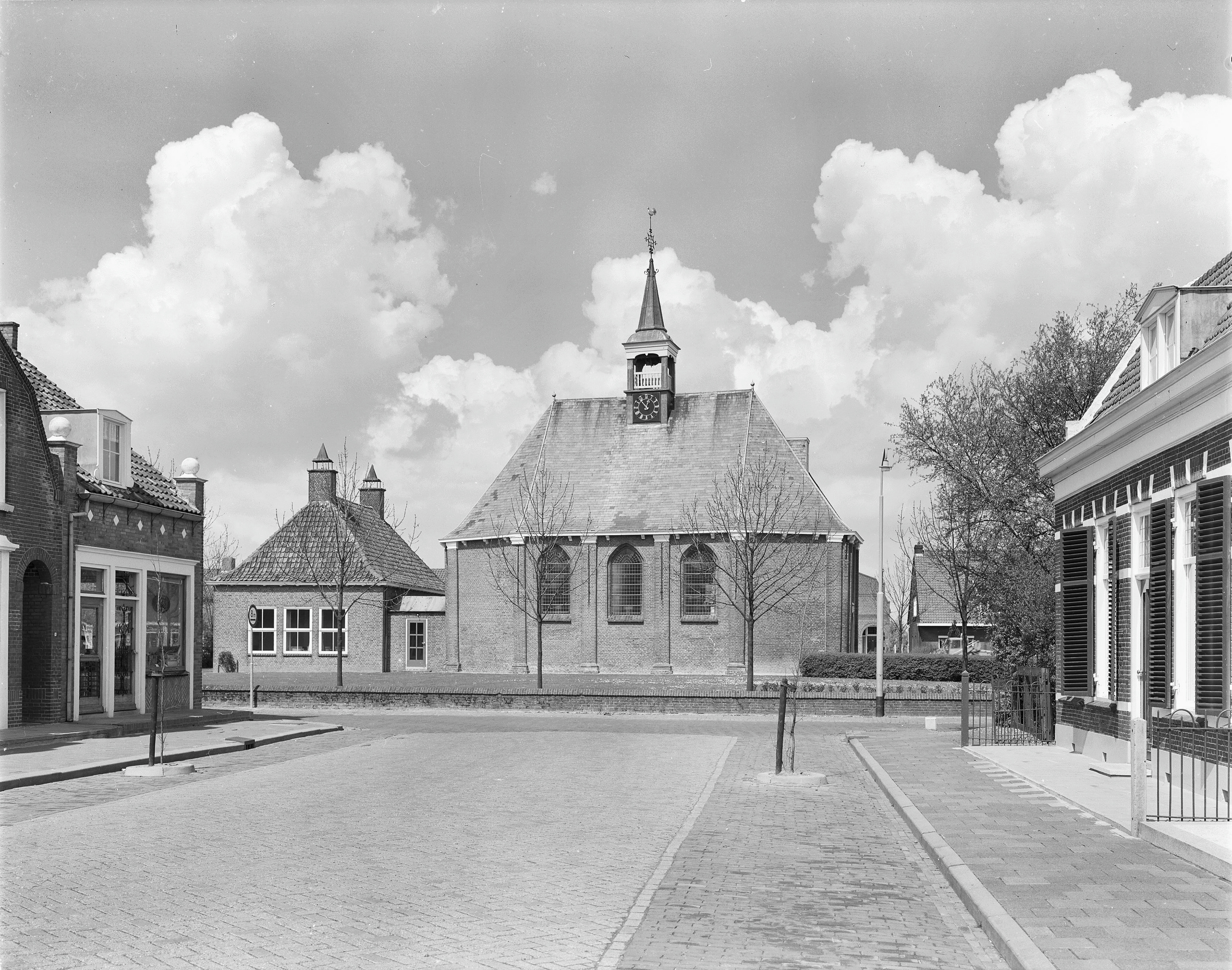
- Street view with Dutch Reformed church

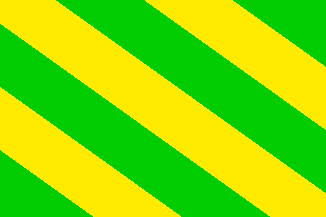
- Flag Coat of arms

- Location in the province of Zeeland in the Netherlands Sint Philipsland (Netherlands)
- Coordinates: 51°37′1″N 4°9′52″E
- Country: Netherlands
- Province: Zeeland
- Municipality: Tholen

Area
  - Total: 25.58 km^{2} (9.88 sq mi)
- Elevation: 0.7 m (2.3 ft)

Population (2021)
  - Total: 2,440
  - Density: 95.4/km^{2} (247/sq mi)
- Time zone: UTC+1 (CET)
  - Summer (DST): UTC+2 (CEST)
- Postal code: 4675
- Dialing code: 0167

Sint Philipsland is a village in the Dutch province of Zeeland. Sint Philpsland is also the name of the (former) island on which the village lies. It is a part of the municipality of Tholen, and lies about 16 km northwest of Bergen op Zoom.

== History ==
The village was first mentioned between 1490 and 1495 as "Ecclesia sti Philippi Apostoli, St. Philipskerc", and is named after Philip the Apostle. The area was diked in 1487 by order of Anna van Bourgondië, the illegitimate daughter of Philip the Good. The first village was flooded in 1509 and 1530, and subsequently abandoned. In 1642, the land was reclaimed again and a regular patterned village with front and back street was constructed.

The Dutch Reformed church was built in 1668 in a neoclassic style with Doric columns. In 1953, an association building was attached to the western side of the church.

Sint Philipsland was home to 654 people in 1840. In 1884, Sint Philipsland was connected to North Brabant via the Slaakdam and no longer an island. Sint Philipsland was severely affected by the North Sea flood of 1953 and ten people were killed.

Sint Philipsland was a separate municipality until 1995, when it was merged with Tholen.

== Notable people ==
- Leen Quist (1942–2014), ceramist

== Gallery ==
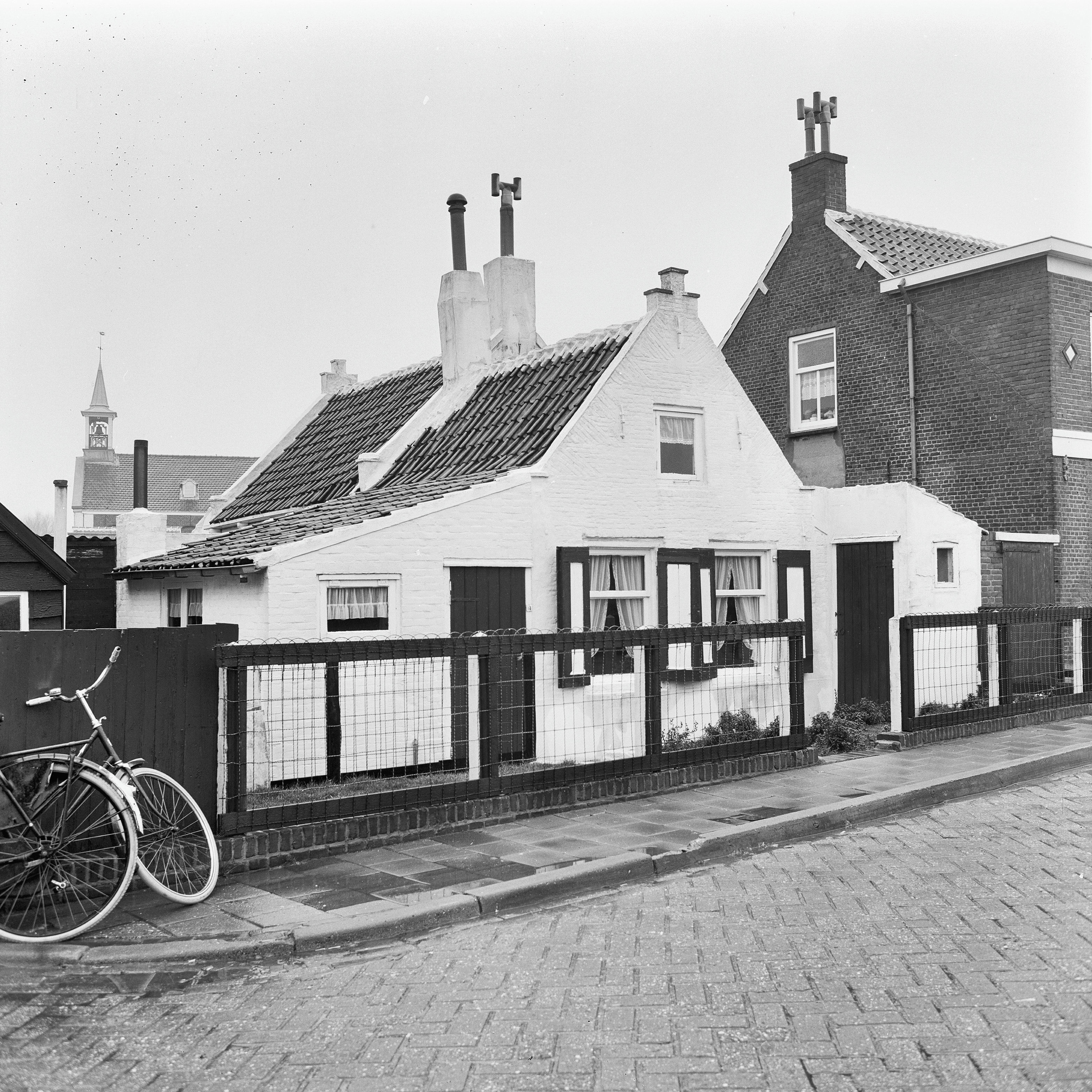
House in Sint Philipsland

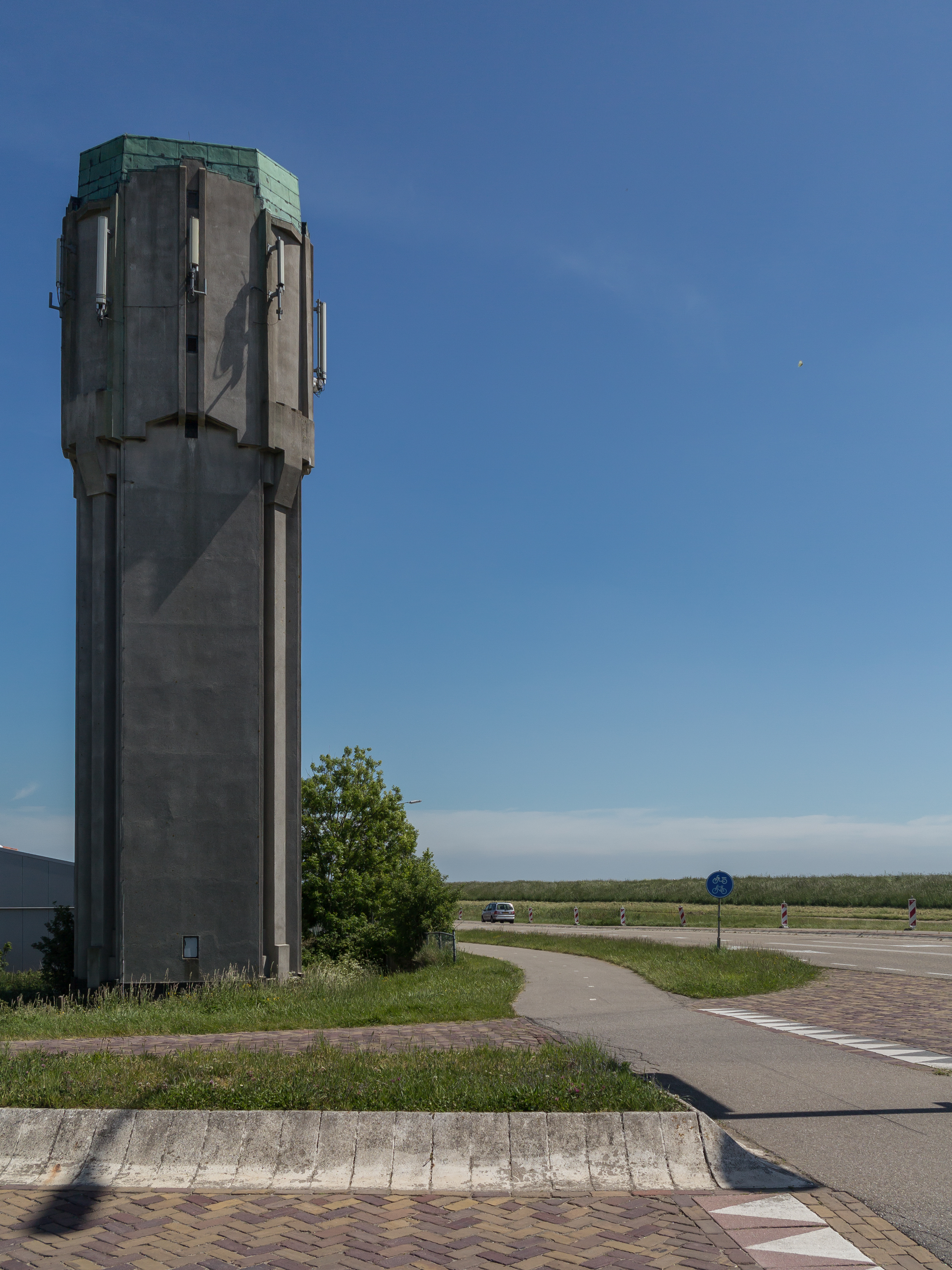
Water tower of Sint Philipsland
