= Tholen =

- Municipality
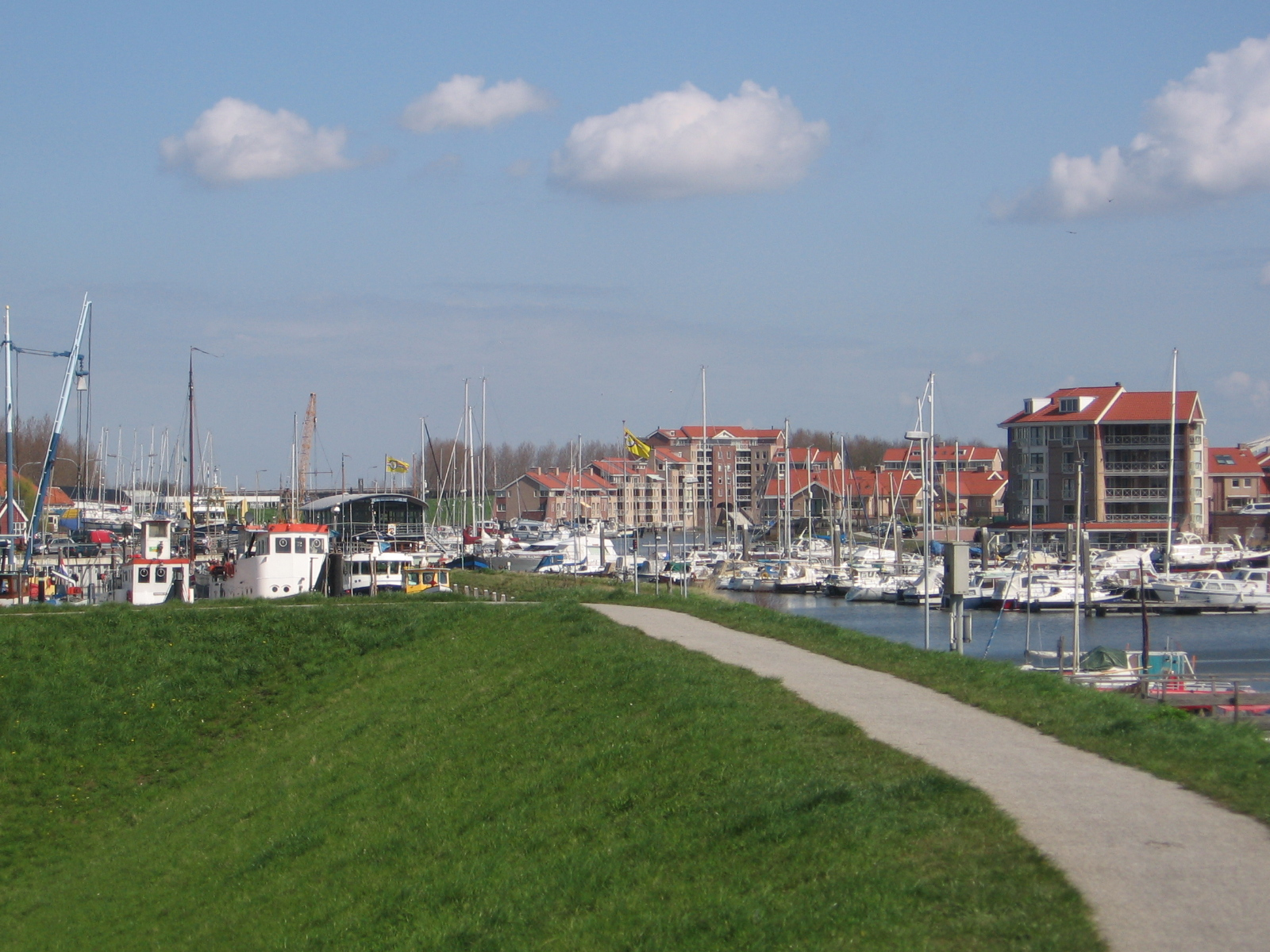
- Harbour of Tholen

- Flag Coat of arms

- Location in Zeeland
- Coordinates: 51°32′N 4°12′E
- Country: Netherlands
- Province: Zeeland

Government
  - Body: Municipal council
  - Mayor: Ger van de Velde-de Wilde (VVD)

Area
  - Total: 254.00 km^{2} (98.07 sq mi)
  - Land: 146.71 km^{2} (56.65 sq mi)
  - Water: 107.29 km^{2} (41.42 sq mi)
- Elevation: −1 m (−3.3 ft)

Population (January 2021)
  - Total: 26,085
  - Density: 178/km^{2} (460/sq mi)
- Demonym: Tholenaar
- Time zone: UTC+1 (CET)
  - Summer (DST): UTC+2 (CEST)
- Postcode: 4675, 4690–4699
- Area code: 0166, 0167
- Website: www.tholen.nl

Tholen (Dutch pronunciation: [ˈtoːlə(n)]) is a 25,000 people municipality in the southwest of the Netherlands. The municipality of Tholen takes its name from the town of Tholen, which is the largest population center in the municipality.

The municipality consists of two peninsulas, formerly islands, the larger one on the south also called Tholen, the smaller one on the north called Sint Philipsland. The two are separated by the former strait, now bay, of Krabbenkreek. The municipality is bordered on the east by the Eendracht, once a Scheldt branch but now part of the Scheldt-Rhine Canal, crossed by three road bridges, by the Oosterschelde estuary to the south, the straits of Keeten-Mastgat to the west and the Krammer strait to the north.

The town has a small historical center partly surrounded by a "gracht" and partly bordered by a harbour for fishing boats and yachts.

== Population centers ==
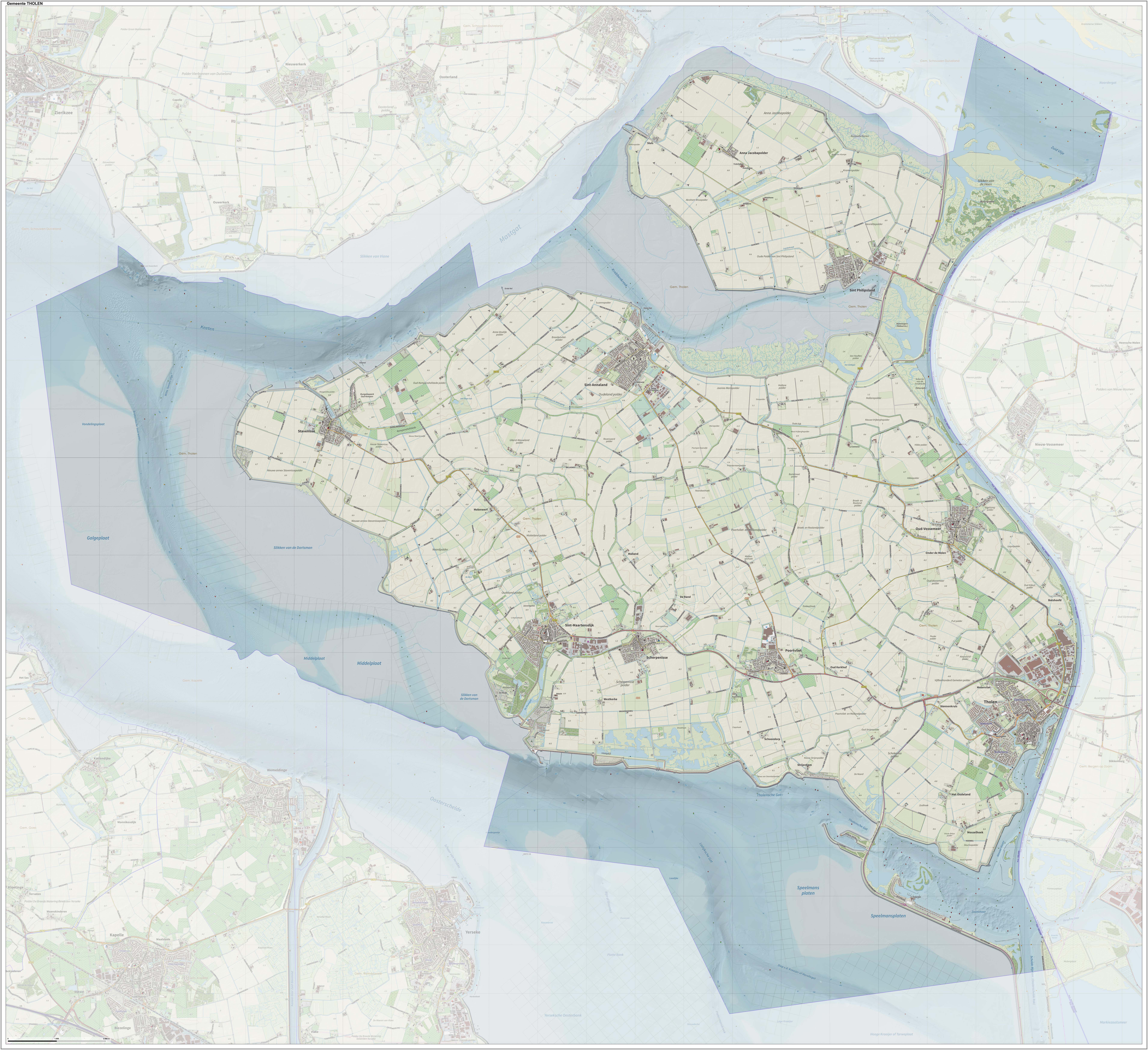
Dutch Topographic map of Tholen, June 2015

On the island Sint Philipsland there are three villages:

- Sint Philipsland
- Anna Jacobapolder
- Sluis

On the island Tholen there are seven population centers:

- Oud-Vossemeer
- Poortvliet
- Scherpenisse
- Sint-Annaland
- Sint-Maartensdijk
- Stavenisse
- Tholen

== Twin town ==
Tholen is twinned with:

- Iława, Poland

== Notable people ==
- Ghiselin Danckerts (ca.1510 in Tholen – 1567) a Dutch composer, singer and music theorist
- Sir Cornelius Vermuyden 1595 in Sint-Maartensdijk – 1677) a Dutch engineer who introduced Dutch land reclamation methods to England
- Colonel Bartholomew Vermuyden, cavalry officer in the New Model Army during the English Civil War.
- Maertin Cornelissen Geldersman, who bought a farm named Rosevelt ("rose field") in Tholen, which gave its name to his descendants Theodore Roosevelt, Eleanore Roosevelt, and Franklin Delano Roosevelt.
- Chris Lanooy (1881 in Sint-Annaland - 1948) a Dutch potter, designer, ceramist, painter, draftsman and sculptor, and he produced stained-glass art
- Leen Quist (1942 in Sint Philipsland – 2014) a Dutch ceramist, liked a perfect finish and geometric (blue) lines
- Elly Plooij-van Gorsel (born 1947 in Tholen) a Member of the European Parliament

=== Sport ===
- Keetie van Oosten-Hage (born 1949 in Sint-Maartensdijk) a Dutch former cyclist
- Deborah Gravenstijn (born 1974 in Tholen) a Dutch judoka and Captain in the Royal Netherlands Air Force; bronze medallist at the 2004 Summer Olympics and silver medallist 2008 Summer Olympics

== Images ==
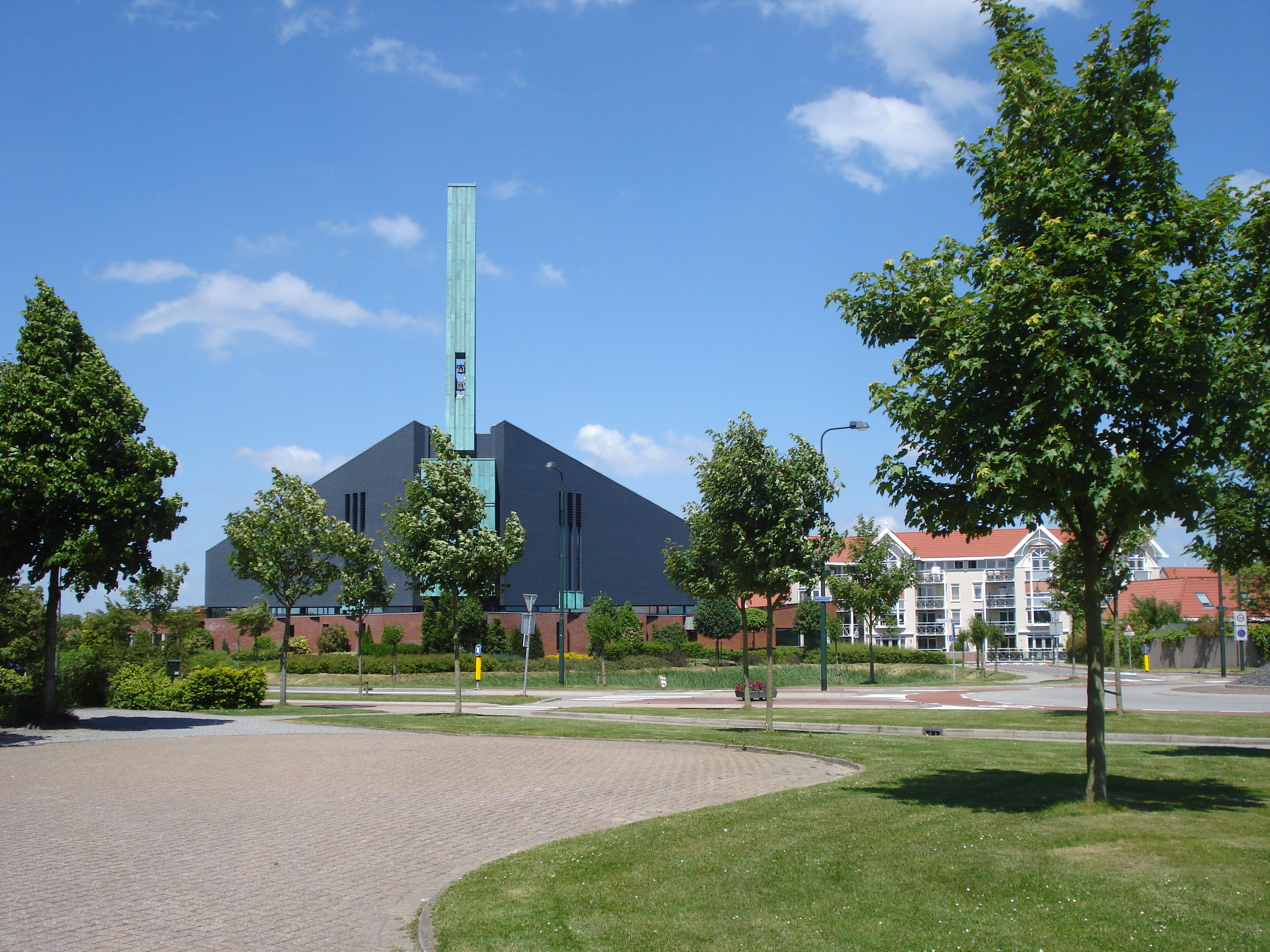
Reformed Congregation Tholen

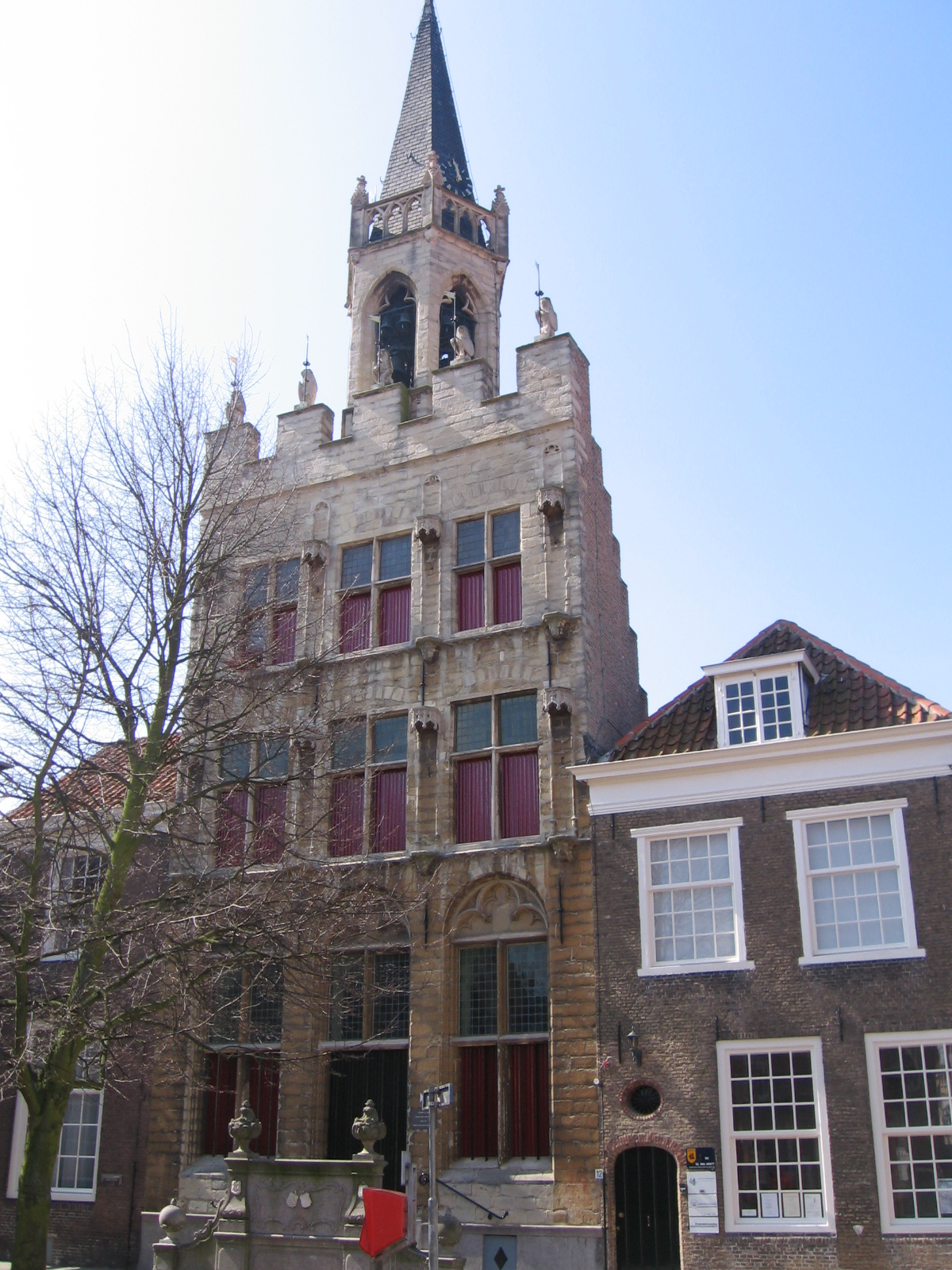
Former city hall

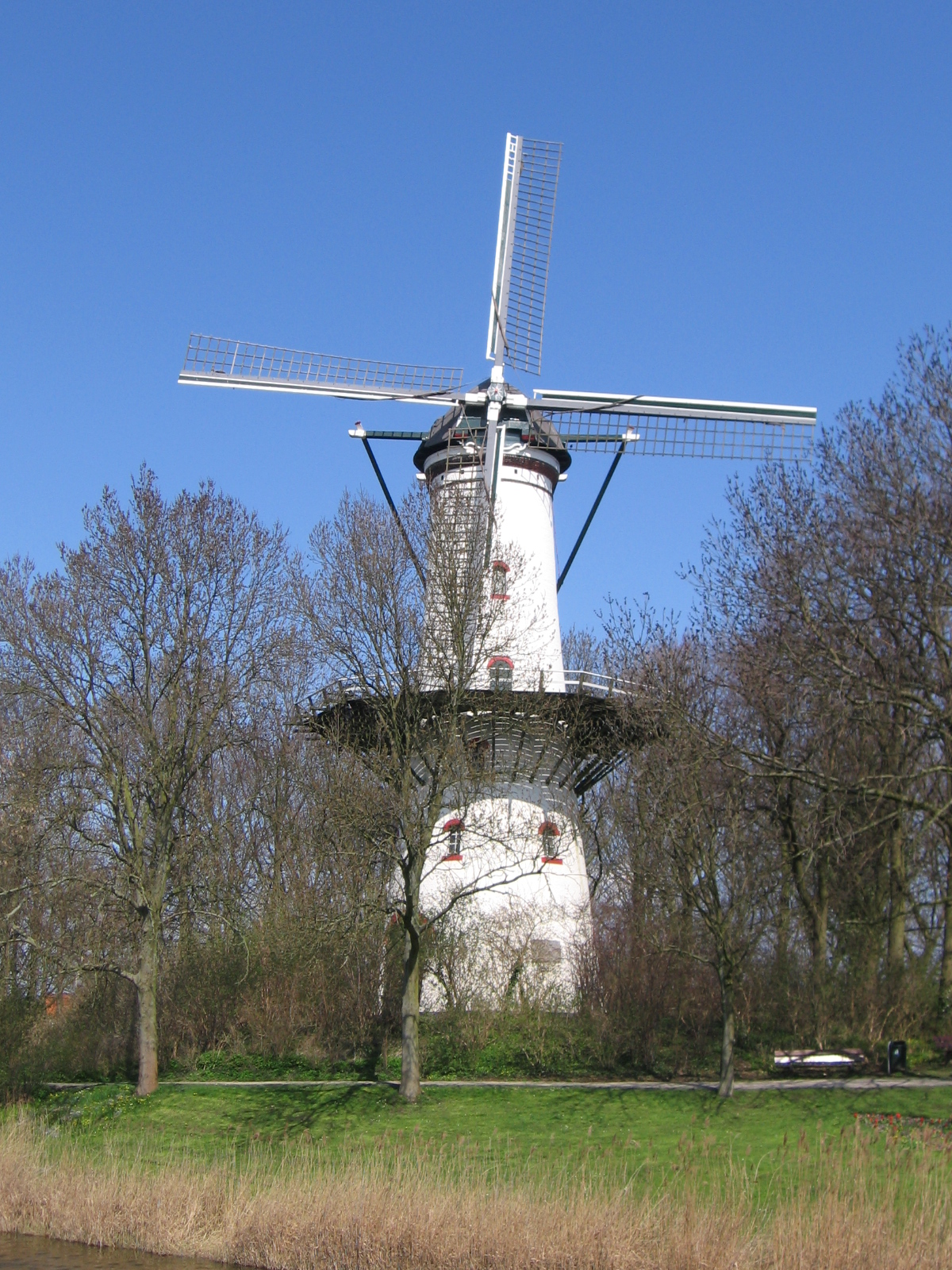
Mill "de Hoop"

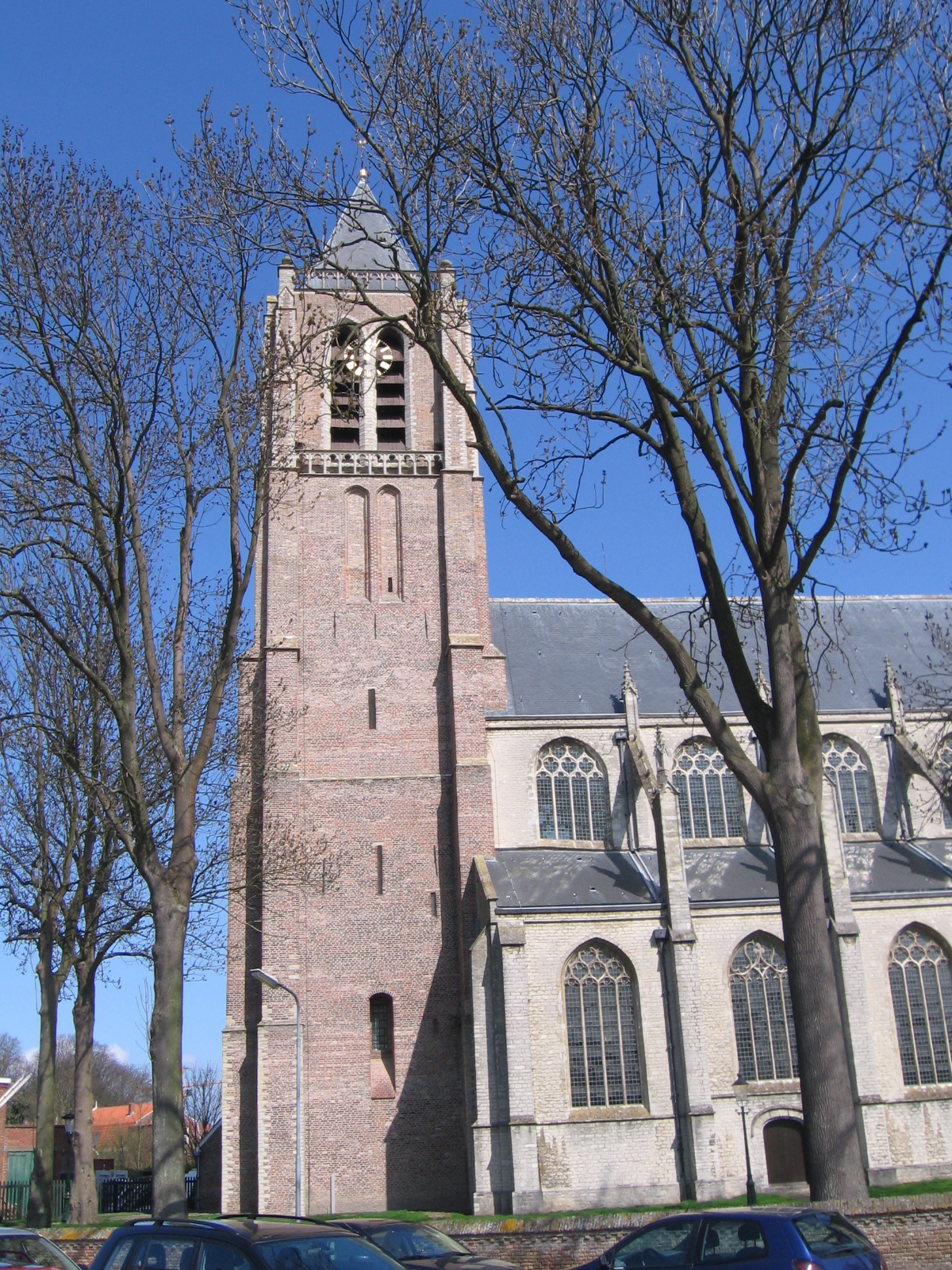
Great Church

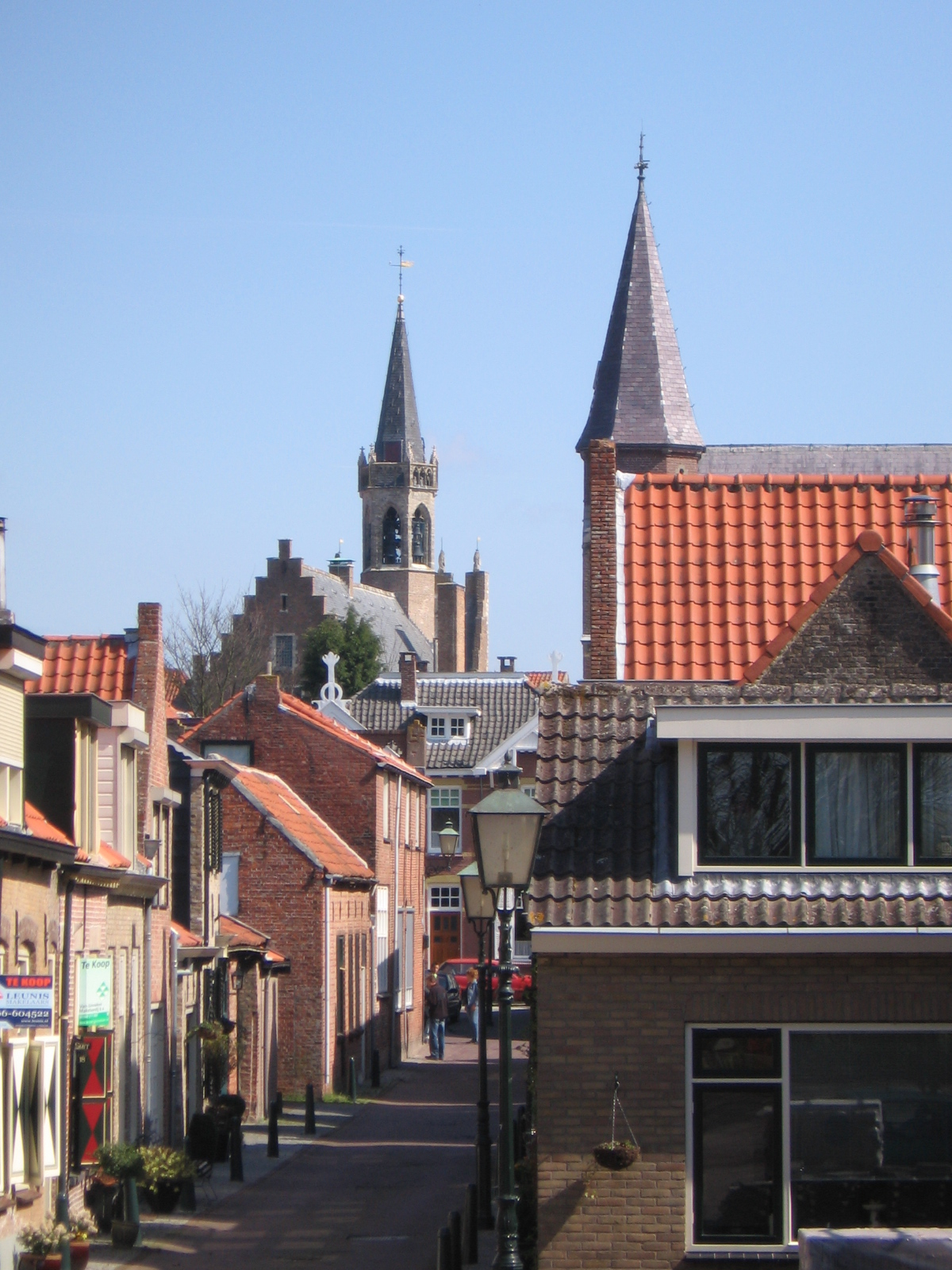
Venkelstreet

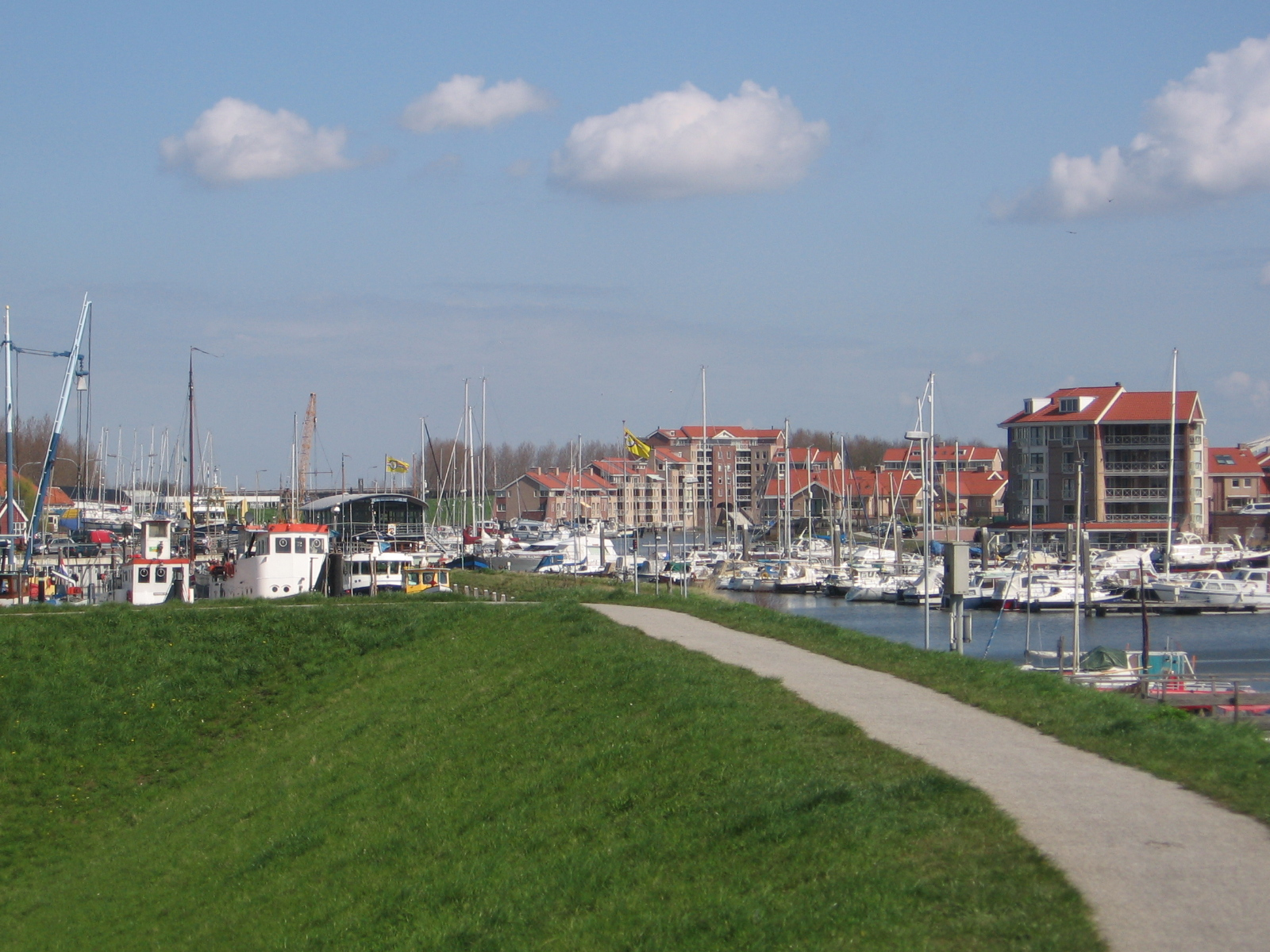
Harbour

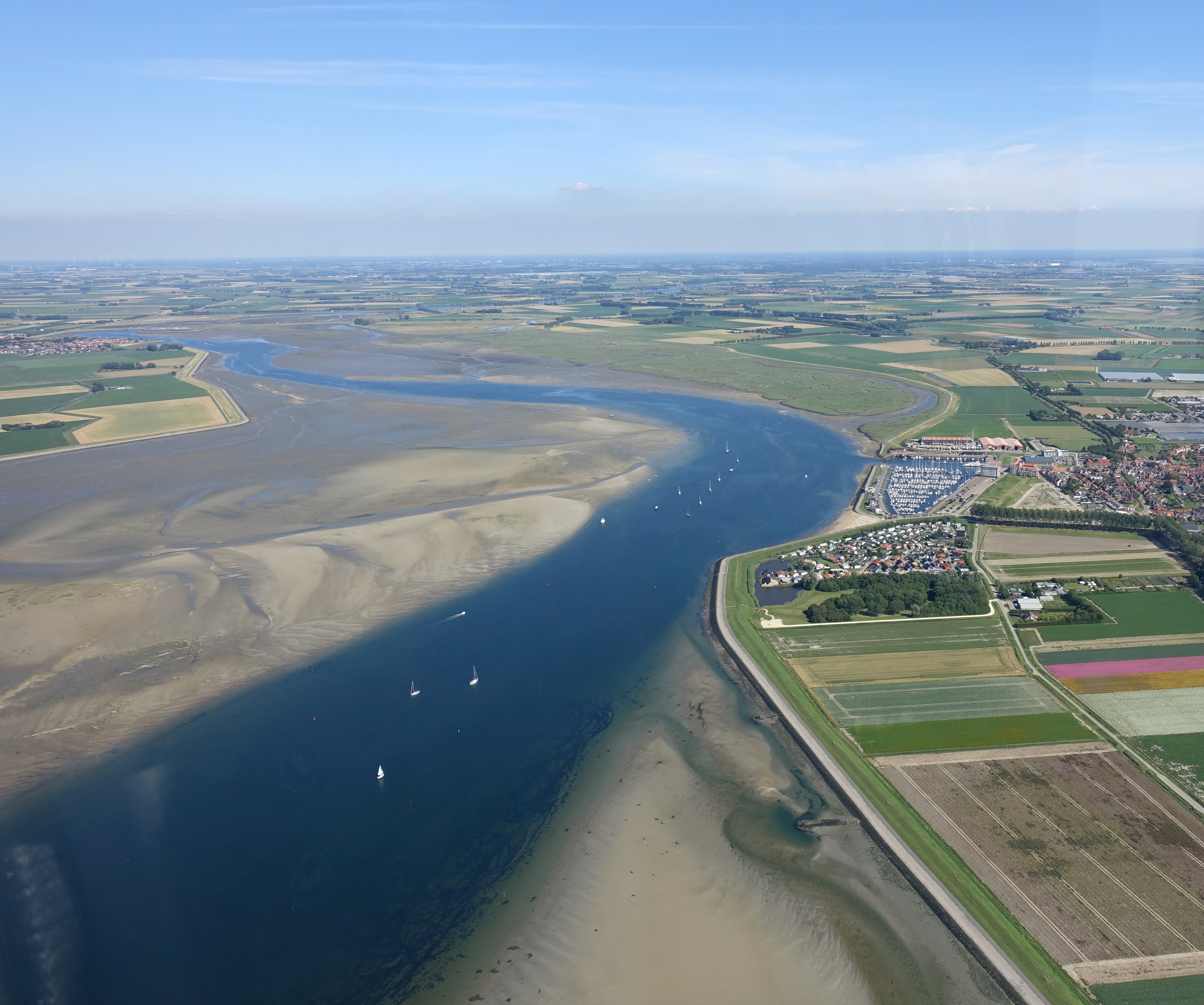
Aerial view of Krabbenkreek
