= Nieuwlande, Zeeland =

Drowned village and former municipality in Zeeland

Coordinates: 51.446946°N 4.114294°E

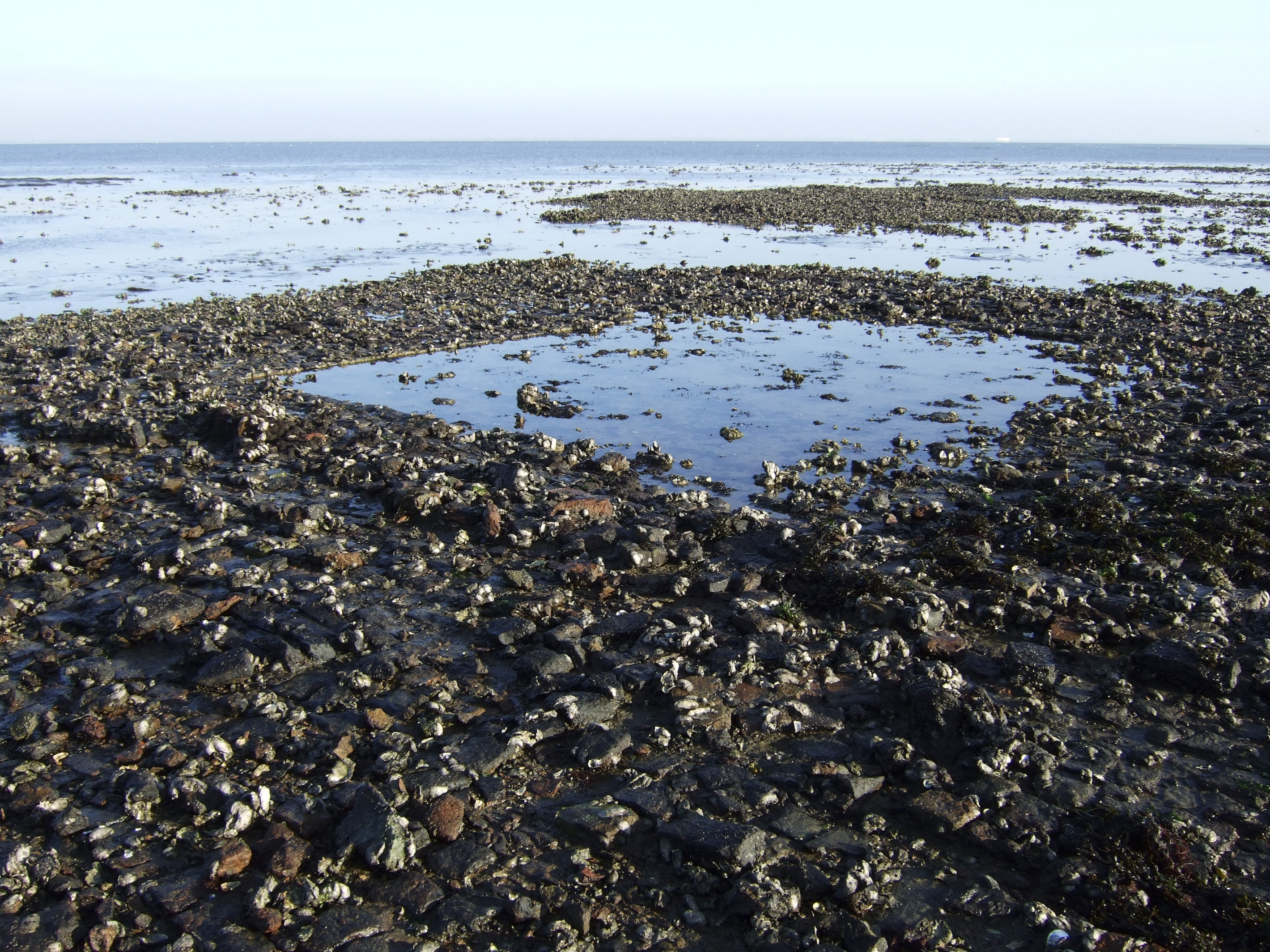
View of the presumed foundation of the church tower of the drowned Medieval village of Nieuwlande

Nieuwlande is a drowned village in the Dutch province of Zeeland. It was located 500 metres from the dike of the present-day Zuid-Beveland, north of Krabbendijke. Today some ruins are clearly visible on satellite pictures.

The small remaining part of the former domain of Nieuwlande was a separate municipality until 1816, when it was merged with Krabbendijke.

Nieuwlande has a coat of arms and a flag (an armorial banner). They depict a red down-turned crescent on a white field, with six green and white wavy lines underneath.
